= Action: The Sweet Anthology =

Compilation album by Sweet
- Released: 28 April 2009
- Recorded: 1971–80
- Genres: Glam rock, hard rock
- Length: 1:55:34
- Label: Shout! Factory

Sweet chronology
| Live at the Rainbow 1973 (1999) | Action: The Sweet Anthology (2009) |

Professional ratings
Review scores
| Source | Rating |
|---|---|
| AllMusic | 4.5/5 stars |
| The Austin Chronicle | 3/5 stars |
| Blender | 4/5 stars |
| MusicTAP | 4.5/5 stars |
| Rolling Stone | 3.5/5 stars |

Action: The Sweet Anthology is a double compilation album of British 1970s rock band Sweet's music, released on 28 April 2009 by Shout! Factory. It features songs originally released on RCA Records and Polydor Records, including all their single records spanning from their 1971 UK breakthrough "Funny Funny" and up to their last non-charting "Sixties Man" before the original band broke up in 1982. The album also contains a few album tracks, as well as some B-sides that were never before released on compact disc in the United States.

== Track listing ==
Disc one
| No. | Title | Writer(s) | Length |
|---|---|---|---|
| 1. | "Funny Funny" | Nicky Chinn, Mike Chapman | 2:49 |
| 2. | "You’re Not Wrong for Loving Me" | Brian Connolly, Steve Priest, Andy Scott, Mick Tucker | 2:50 |
| 3. | "Co–Co" | Chinn, Chapman | 3:13 |
| 4. | "Alexander Graham Bell" | Chinn, Chapman | 2:57 |
| 5. | "Poppa Joe" | Chinn, Chapman | 3:12 |
| 6. | "Little Willy" | Chinn, Chapman | 3:15 |
| 7. | "Wig-Wam Bam" | Chinn, Chapman | 3:03 |
| 8. | "Blockbuster" | Chinn, Chapman | 3:16 |
| 9. | "Hell Raiser" | Chinn, Chapman | 3:18 |
| 10. | "Ballroom Blitz" | Chinn, Chapman | 4:03 |
| 11. | "Teenage Rampage" | Chinn, Chapman | 3:36 |
| 12. | "The 6-Teens" | Chinn, Chapman | 4:04 |
| 13. | "Rebel Rouser" | Connolly, Priest, Scott, Tucker | 3:24 |
| 14. | "Turn It Down" | Chinn, Chapman | 3:28 |
| 15. | "A.C.D.C." | Chinn, Chapman | 3:26 |
| 16. | "Fox on the Run" | Connolly, Priest, Scott, Tucker | 3:25 |

Disc two
| No. | Title | Writer(s) | Length |
|---|---|---|---|
| 1. | "Action" | Connolly, Priest, Scott, Tucker | 3:45 |
| 2. | "Sweet F.A." | Connolly, Priest, Scott, Tucker | 6:14 |
| 3. | "The Lies in Your Eyes" | Connolly, Priest, Scott, Tucker | 3:37 |
| 4. | "No You Don’t" | Chinn, Chapman | 4:32 |
| 5. | "4 July" | Connolly, Priest, Scott, Tucker | 4:26 |
| 6. | "Lost Angels" | Connolly, Priest, Scott, Tucker | 4:04 |
| 7. | "Funk It Up (David's Song)" | Connolly, Priest, Scott, Tucker | 3:32 |
| 8. | "Fever of Love" | Connolly, Priest, Scott, Tucker | 4:07 |
| 9. | "Stairway to the Stars" | Connolly, Priest, Scott, Tucker | 3:11 |
| 10. | "Love Is Like Oxygen" (Album version) | Scott, Trevor Griffin | 6:52 |
| 11. | "Cover Girl" | Scott, Tucker, Priest, Connolly | 3:35 |
| 12. | "California Nights" | Scott, Tucker, Priest, Connolly | 3:41 |
| 13. | "Call Me" | Scott | 3:41 |
| 14. | "Big Apple Waltz" | Priest, Scott | 4:03 |
| 15. | "Give the Lady Some Respect" | Ray McRiner | 3:27 |
| 16. | "Sixties Man" | Pip Williams, Peter Hutchins | 4:09 |

== Personnel ==
Sweet

- Andy Scott – guitar, synthesizer, backing vocals
- Steve Priest – lead vocals on "No You Don't", "California Nights", "Call Me", "Big Apple Waltz", "Give the Lady Some Respect" and "Sixties Man", bass, backing vocals
- Brian Connolly – lead vocals on all other tracks, backing vocals
- Mick Tucker – drums, percussion, backing vocals
