= The Sweet's Biggest Hits =

Greatest hits album by The Sweet
- Released: December 1972
- Genre: Bubblegum; pop rock; glam rock
- Length: 32:05
- Label: RCA Victor/Bell
- Producer: The Sweet, Phil Wainman

The Sweet chronology
Funny How Sweet Co-Co Can Be (1971)	The Sweet's Biggest Hits (1972)	The Sweet (1973)

The Sweet's Biggest Hits is a 1972 greatest hits album by English glam rock band Sweet. It contains their six hit singles which made the UK chart in 1971/72, the 'B' sides to the first four and an album track, "Chop Chop" which was released as a single in some countries but not in the UK. The album reached number three in Finland.

Professional ratings
Review scores
Source	Rating
AllMusic	3/5 stars

== Track listing ==
=== Side one ===
1. "Wig-Wam Bam" (Mike Chapman, Nicky Chinn) – 2:57
2. "Little Willy" (Chapman, Chinn) – 3:10
3. "Done Me Wrong Alright" (Brian Connolly, Steve Priest, Andy Scott, Mick Tucker) – 2:53
4. "Poppa Joe" (Chapman, Chinn) – 3:07
5. "Funny Funny" (Chapman, Chinn) – 2:46
6. "Co-Co" (Chapman, Chinn) – 3:08

=== Side two ===
1. "Alexander Graham Bell" (Chapman, Chinn) – 2:50
2. "Chop Chop" (Chapman, Chinn) – 2:55
3. "You're Not Wrong for Loving Me" (Connolly, Priest, Scott, Tucker) – 2:44
4. "Jeanie" (Connolly, Priest, Scott, Tucker) – 2:53
5. "Spotlight" (Connolly, Priest, Scott, Tucker) – 2:42
