= Poppa Joe =

1972 single by the Sweet

- German release picture sleeve

Single by the Sweet
- B-side: "Jeannie"
- Released: 28 January 1972
- Recorded: November 1971
- Studio: Island, London
- Genre: Bubblegum; calypso
- Length: 3:07
- Label: RCA
- Songwriters: Mike Chapman; Nicky Chinn
- Producer: Phil Wainman

The Sweet singles chronology
"Alexander Graham Bell" (1972)	"Poppa Joe" (1972)	"Little Willy" (1972)

"Poppa Joe" is a 1972 song recorded by the Sweet. Written by Mike Chapman and Nicky Chinn, it went to number eleven in the UK. It was released in the United Kingdom by RCA Records on 28 January 1972. The single combines the band's early bubblegum sound with calypso, particularly in the use of a steelpan throughout the song. It was featured as a bonus track on a 2005 re-release of the band's debut studio album, Funny How Sweet Co-Co Can Be.

== Background ==
The Sweet had initially found success in 1971 with the bubblegum songs "Funny, Funny" and "Co-Co", both of which were top-ten hits in Europe. Their next single, "Alexander Graham Bell" was a departure from the bubblegum style and failed to achieve the same success, only reaching the top 40 in the UK and top 30 in Germany. Following this, the band's main songwriters Mike Chapman and Nicky Chinn returned to the successful bubblegum formula with "Poppa Joe".

Bass guitarist Steve Priest noted that the song "reverted to the Caribbean style of 'Co-Co'", attributing this to the fact it was recorded at Island Studios. As with the band's previous singles, they did not perform the instrumentation on the song, only providing the vocals. The instrumentation was instead by session musicians Phil Wainman, and Pip Williams, though the band did perform on their self-penned B-side "Jeannie".

== Release and reception ==
"Poppa Joe" was released as a single on 28 January 1972 in the UK by RCA Records. Reviewing for New Musical Express, Derek Johnson wrote that the song "exudes a wonderfully happy feel – bright and bubbling, with bongoes and oil-drum percussion infusing a sparkling and captivating West Indian flavour. The lyrics are simple and easy to sing along with in the constantly-repeated hook, and the tune is instantly catchy".

The single performed much better the band's previous single, peaking at number 11 in the UK, number 70 in Australia, and was a top-three hits in a number of European countries, including Germany, Denmark and Sweden, peaking at number one in the Netherlands and Belgium.

== Personnel ==
The Sweet

- Brian Connolly – lead vocals
- Steve Priest – backing vocals
- Andy Scott – backing vocals
- Mick Tucker – backing vocals

Additional personnel

- John Roberts – bass
- Phil Wainman – drums, percussion
- Pip Williams – guitar
- Fiachra Trench – arrangements

== Charts ==
Chart (1971–1972)	Peak position
Australia (Kent Music Report)	70
Belgium (Ultratop 50 Flanders)	1
Belgium (Ultratop 50 Wallonia)	4
Denmark (IFPI)	2
Finland (Suomen virallinen lista)	1
Ireland (IRMA)	16
Netherlands (Dutch Top 40)	1
Netherlands (Single Top 100)	1
New Zealand (Listener)	14
Norway (VG-lista)	2
Rhodesia (Lyons Maid)	5
South Africa (Springbok Radio)	12
Spain (Promusicae)	21
Sweden (Kvällstoppen)	2
Switzerland (Schweizer Hitparade)	2
UK Singles (Official Charts)	11
US Cash Box Looking Ahead	5
West Germany (GfK)	3
