= Sweet Fanny Adams (album) =

Studio album by The Sweet
- Released: 26 April 1974
- Recorded: 1972 (track 14 & 16); 19 June 1973 (track 18); January 1974
- Studios: Audio International Studios, London; Advision Studios, London
- Genres: Hard rock; glam rock; heavy metal; bubblegum pop
- Length: 39:37 (original); 46:14 (1997 reissue); 53:48 (1999 reissue); 75:16 (2005 reissue)
- Labels: RCA; Capitol (US)
- Producer: Phil Wainman

The Sweet chronology
The Sweet (1973)	Sweet Fanny Adams (1974)	Desolation Boulevard (1974)

Singles from Sweet Fanny Adams
- 1. "Peppermint Twist" Released: 15 March 1974 (AU only)

Professional ratings
Review scores
Source	Rating
AllMusic	3.5/5 stars
Classic Rock	4/5 stars

Sweet Fanny Adams is the second studio album by the English glam rock band Sweet, released on 26 April 1974 through RCA Records.

Like the previous album, Funny How Sweet Co-Co Can Be, it was only released in the UK, but five of its songs appeared on the US version of Desolation Boulevard released in May 1975. It is not available on streaming services in most regions.

The album title is English (originally Royal Navy) slang originating from the murder of eight-year-old Fanny Adams in 1867 and means "nothing at all" as well as a similar euphemism "F.A." = "fuck all".

Sweet Fanny Adams reached No. 27 on the UK Albums Chart in the year of its release by RCA Records in 1974, the only Sweet studio album to enter the chart. It reached No. 2 in the albums chart of West Germany.

== Composition ==
A turning point for the band, it features more of a hard rock sound than the bubblegum of their previous works. "Rebel Rouser" and "Peppermint Twist" are exceptions to this. The album has elements of psychedelia, while "Set Me Free" is a proto-speed metal song, and "Sweet F.A." has lyrics that foreshadow punk rock.

Sweet Fanny Adams features compressed high-pitched backing vocal harmonies, a trend that continued on all of Sweet's albums.

== Legacy ==
The late 1980s Indiana-based glam metal band Sweet F.A., which released a pair of major-label albums in 1989 and 1991, named themselves after the Sweet song. English rock group Love and Rockets titled their 1996 album Sweet F.A..

"AC-DC" was covered by American rock band Joan Jett and the Blackhearts in 2006 on their 11th album Sinner as "A.C.D.C.", Mötley Crüe frontman Vince Neil also covered the song on his third solo album Tattoos & Tequila as "AC/DC".

"Set me Free" was covered by English heavy metal band Saxon in 1984 on their 6th album Crusader.

== Track listing ==
Notes taken from the original album booklet.

All tracks are written by Sweet, except where noted.

Side 1
No.	Title	Writer(s)	Length
1.	"Set Me Free"	Andy Scott	3:57
2.	"Heartbreak Today"		5:02
3.	"No You Don't"	Mike Chapman, Nicky Chinn	4:35
4.	"Rebel Rouser"		3:25
5.	"Peppermint Twist"	Joey Dee, Henry Glover	3:29

Side 2
No.	Title	Writer(s)	Length
6.	"Sweet F.A."		6:15
7.	"Restless"		4:29
8.	"In to the Night"	Scott	4:35
9.	"AC-DC"	Nicky Chinn, Mike Chapman	3:29
Total length:			39:37

Bonus tracks on 1997 reissue
No.	Title	Writer(s)	Length
10.	"The Ballroom Blitz"	Chapman, Chinn	4:03
11.	"Teenage Rampage"	Chapman, Chinn	3:34
Total length:			46:14

Bonus tracks on 1999 reissue
No.	Title	Length
12.	"Burn on the Flame"	3:37
13.	"Own Up, Take a Look at Yourself"	3:57
Total length:		53:48

Bonus tracks on 2005 reissue
No.	Title	Writer(s)	Length
14.	"Block Buster!"	Chapman, Chinn	3:12
15.	"Need a Lot of Lovin'"		3:00
16.	"Hell Raiser"	Chapman, Chinn	3:26
17.	"Burning"		4:04
18.	"The Ballroom Blitz"	Chapman, Chinn	3:56
19.	"Rock 'n' Roll Disgrace"		3:50
Total length:			75:16

== Personnel ==
Notes taken from the original album booklet.

Sweet

- Brian Connolly – lead vocals (except tracks 3, 7, 8), handclaps, tambourine
- Steve Priest – lead vocals (tracks 3, 7), bass guitar, 6-string bass
- Mick Tucker – vocals, timpani, tubular bells, gong, effects (drums is uncredited)
- Andy Scott – lead vocals (track 8), guitars, Moog synthesiser (track 1), piano, cello

^credited only (uncredited)

== Charts ==
=== Weekly charts ===
Chart (1974)	Peak position
Australian Albums (Kent Music Report)	33
Austrian Albums (Ö3 Austria)	6
Finnish Albums (Suomen virallinen lista)	9
German Albums (Offizielle Top 100)	2
Norwegian Albums (VG-lista)	12
Swedish Albums (Sverigetopplistan)	4
UK Albums (Official Charts)	27

=== Year-end charts ===
Chart (1974)	Position
German Albums (Offizielle Top 100)	14

== Certifications and sales ==
Region	Certification	Certified units/sales
United Kingdom (BPI)	Gold	100,000^{^}
^{^} Shipments figures based on certification alone.
