= The Sweet (album) =

Compilation album by Sweet
- Released: July 1973
- Recorded: 1971–1973
- Genre: Glam rock; power pop
- Length: 30:28
- Label: Bell
- Producer: Phil Wainman

Sweet chronology
The Sweet's Biggest Hits (1972)	The Sweet (1973)	Sweet Fanny Adams (1974)

Singles from The Sweet
- 1. "Little Willy" Released: January 1973; 2. "Block Buster!" Released: June 1973; 3. "Wig-Wam Bam" Released: December 1973

Professional ratings
Review scores
Source	Rating
AllMusic	link
Christgau's Record Guide	B−

The Sweet is a compilation album released as English glam rock band Sweet's debut album in the US and Canada, substituting for the 1971 UK album Funny How Sweet Co-Co Can Be. (The band's second album, Sweet Fanny Adams was also not given a US release, but tracks from that and the band's third album Desolation Boulevard were combined on the US version of that album to compensate for this.)

The album consisted primarily of singles and B-sides released in the UK and Europe in 1972 and 1973. One of the singles, "Little Willy", was Sweet's first and biggest hit single in the US. The singles "Wig-Wam Bam", "Hell Raiser" and "Block Buster!" were also on the album. It was a commercial flop, only reaching No. 191 in the Billboard 200.

== Track listing ==
1. "Little Willy" (Mike Chapman, Nicky Chinn) – 3:13
2. "New York Connection" – 3:35
3. "Wig-Wam Bam" (Chapman, Chinn) – 3:03
4. "Done Me Wrong All Right" – 2:58
5. "Hell Raiser" (Chapman, Chinn) – 3:15
6. "Block Buster!" (Chapman, Chinn) – 3:12
7. "Need a Lot of Lovin'" – 3:00
8. "Man from Mecca" – 2:45
9. "Spotlight" – 2:47
10. "You're Not Wrong for Loving Me" – 2:58

== Notes ==
The American CD reissue of this album includes the live version of the song "Need a Lot of Lovin'", apparently in error. The studio version was only available as a B-side of the single "Block Buster!" and is available on the 2005 re-issue of Sweet Fanny Adams. The original American vinyl pressing used the studio version of "Need A Lot of Lovin'".

== Personnel ==
- Brian Connolly – lead vocals
- Steve Priest – bass, vocals
- Andy Scott – guitars, vocals, synthesizers
- Mick Tucker – drums, vocals
