= Hell Raiser (The Sweet song) =

Single by The Sweet

from the album The Sweet
- B-side: "Burning"
- Released: 27 April 1973
- Recorded: March 1973
- Genre: Glam rock
- Length: 3:15
- Label: RCA
- Songwriters: Michael Chapman; Nicky Chinn
- Producer: Phil Wainman

The Sweet singles chronology
"Block Buster!" (1973)	"Hell Raiser" (1973)	"The Ballroom Blitz" (1973)

"Hell Raiser" is a song by British glam rock band the Sweet. Written by Mike Chapman and Nicky Chinn, who wrote many hit songs for the band, it was released as a single on 27 April 1973. Later the same year, it was featured on The Sweet, a compilation album of the band's material released from 1971 to 1973.

== Reception ==
"Hell Raiser" peaked at number two for three weeks in the UK charts in May 1973, losing out to number one by two songs: Tony Orlando's "Tie a Yellow Ribbon Round the Ole Oak Tree" for one week and Wizzard's "See My Baby Jive" for the remaining two. It also went to number two in Ireland. It became their fifth of eight songs to reach the top of the charts in Germany (the fifth-highest artist to have the most number ones in that country, tying with Boney M.). Additionally, it went to number five in Norway and number four in both Austria and the Netherlands; it was a minor hit in Australia, only charting at number 49.

== Charts ==
Chart (1973)	Peak position
Australia (Kent Music Report)	49
Austria (Ö3 Austria Top 40)	4
Belgium (Ultratop 50 Flanders)	3
Belgium (Ultratop 50 Wallonia)	26
Germany (GfK)	1
Ireland (IRMA)	2
Netherlands (Single Top 100)	4
New Zealand (Listener)	4
Norway (VG-lista)	5
UK Singles (Official Charts)	2
