= Paul Mario Day =

British singer (1956–2025)

- Day in 1976

Background information
- Born: Paul Mario Day; 19 April 1956; Whitechapel, London, England
- Died: 29 July 2025 (aged 69) Newcastle, New South Wales, Australia
- Genres: Heavy metal, progressive rock, hard rock, glam rock
- Occupation: Musician
- Years active: 1975–2025
- Formerly of: Iron Maiden, More, Sweet, Wildfire, Crimzon Lake, Defaced

Paul Mario Day (19 April 1956 – 29 July 2025) was an English singer who was the original lead vocalist of heavy metal band Iron Maiden from 1975 to 1976, More from 1980 to 1981 and Sweet from 1985 to 1988.

== Iron Maiden ==
Day was the first lead singer for Iron Maiden, from December 1975 to October 1976. On the Iron Maiden The Early Days DVD it was mentioned that Day was fired because he did not have enough stage charisma. He was replaced by Dennis Wilcock. Years later he claimed co-authorship of the Iron Maiden song "Strange World".

== Career after Iron Maiden ==
Day later formed a band called More that played at the Donington Monsters of Rock Festival in 1981, and also included onetime Iron Maiden guitarist Paul Todd (who was in Iron Maiden for two days and never recorded or played live and only did a photo session with them) and Def Leppard drummer Frank Noone in the line-up. He was lead singer of Wildfire from 1983 to 1984. In 1985, Sweet were re-formed by Andy Scott and Mick Tucker, then featuring Paul Day. He recorded a live album at the Marquee Club in London as lead singer of Sweet in 1986. After this engagement he lived in Australia beginning in 1986 and was the lead vocalist of two bands from Newcastle, New South Wales. He performed covers of rock songs with the band Defaced and sang and wrote for Crimzon Lake, now disbanded, an unsigned hard rock band. He appeared on the Australian progressive metal band Buffalo Crows' album Bovonic Empire as a guest musician.

In 2019, the original 1975 Iron Maiden line-up by Steve Harris held a reunion concert in London with Day on vocals, and Dave Sullivan and Terry Rance on guitar. Original drummer Ron Matthews was absent.

== Death ==
Day died from cancer on 29 July 2025, at the age of 69.

== Discography ==
=== More ===
Atlantic:

- Warhead, 1981
- Fire, (Single) 1981
- We Are The Band, 1981

=== Wildfire ===
Mausoleum Records:

- Brute Force And Ignorance, 1983
- Summer Lightning, 1983
- Jerusalem (7", Single), 1984
- Nothing Lasts Forever (7"), 1984

=== Sweet ===
- Live at the Marquee

=== Crimson Lake ===
- Crimzon Lake (CD, EP), Not On Label (Crimzon Lake), 2011

=== Buffalo Crows ===
- Buffalo Crows (with Paul Mario Day) – Defenders, LP 'Bovonic Empires'

=== Compilation ===
- Brute Force & Ignorance + Summer Lightning (2xCD, Comp), Golden Core, 2020
- Guilty; Various – Cart & Horses The Birthplace Of Iron Maiden – Wasted Year 2020 (CD, Comp); Not on Label; 2021
