= Little Willy (song) =

1972 single by the Sweet

Single by The Sweet

from the album The Sweet
- B-side: "Man from Mecca"
- Released: 19 May 1972
- Recorded: April 1972
- Studio: Nova Sound
- Genre: Glam rock; blues rock; power pop; bubblegum; pop rock
- Length: 3:13
- Label: RCA (UK); Bell (US & Canada)
- Songwriters: Nicky Chinn; Mike Chapman
- Producer: Phil Wainman

The Sweet singles chronology
"Poppa Joe" (1972)	"Little Willy" (1972)	"Wig-Wam Bam" (1972)

Official audio
- "Little Willy" on YouTube

"Little Willy" is a song written by songwriters Nicky Chinn and Mike Chapman and performed by the British glam rock band the Sweet, released in 1972 as a non-album single in the UK, peaking at number 4 in the UK Singles Chart. It was released in the US in January 1973 and also appeared on their US debut album The Sweet and became their biggest hit in the US, reaching number 3 on the Billboard Hot 100. Billboard ranked it as the number 18 song for 1973.

"Little Willy" was used extensively in the pilot of the television series Life on Mars.

== Background ==
The Sweet's previous single, "Poppa Joe", whilst more successful elsewhere in Europe, had failed to make the top-ten in the UK, peaking at number 11. The song was in the bubblegum pop formula with which the Sweet had first gained success in 1971 with "Funny, Funny" and "Co-Co". Songwriter Nicky Chinn recognised that interest in bubblegum pop songs was waning in the UK and decided to write a song that more closely reflected the band's self-penned rock songs (which had been released as the B-sides of their previous singles). The resulting song, "Little Willy", took elements of glam rock but still kept elements of bubblegum with the lyrics full of double entendres. Regarding the more risqué lyrics, Andy Scott said that "If the BBC had realised it was that blatant, it would never have got played and would never have been the hit that it was".

The song marked the last A-side on which all the instruments were played by session musicians, with the band members only providing the vocals. The session musicians were John Roberts, Phil Wainman and Pip Williams, who had also performed on the band's previous singles.

== Release and reception ==
"Little Willy" was released as a single on 19 May 1972 in the UK by RCA Records. The B-side, "Man from Mecca", was written by the band and refers to the Mecca Leisure Group. The band had been touring around the UK at Mecca Ballrooms, but at the Portsmouth Locarno, the band were banned from the rest of the tour following an alleged "suggestive stage act". Reviewing the single for Record Mirror, Peter Jones wrote that "the vocal sound is fuller, more dominant and better controlled [than "Poppa Joe"]" and that "it's a pop song of simplicity and catchy, despite not having much of a range".

The single was released in the US by Bell Records in July 1972, with Cash Box describing the song as having "raunchy vocals and driving rhythms". It did not make much of an impact at the time, though gained more traction after being reissued in January 1973. It entered the charts that month, though did not reach its peak on the Billboard and Cash Box until May, peaking at number three on both.

In a retrospective review of glitter rock, Bomp! noted that although rock music journalists almost uniformly "loathed it", the song was a huge commercial success and "helped launch the essential glitter rock formula sound".

== Personnel ==
The Sweet

- Brian Connolly – lead vocals
- Steve Priest – backing vocals
- Andy Scott – backing vocals
- Mick Tucker – backing vocals

Additional personnel

- John Roberts – bass
- Phil Wainman – drums, timbales
- Pip Williams – guitar

== Chart performance ==
=== Weekly charts ===
Chart (1972–1973)	Peak position
Australia (Kent Music Report)	65
Belgium (Ultratop 50 Flanders)	7
Belgium (Ultratop 50 Wallonia)	19
Canada Top Singles (RPM)	1
Denmark (IFPI)	3
Finland (Suomen virallinen lista)	2
Ireland (IRMA)	9
Netherlands (Dutch Top 40)	7
Netherlands (Single Top 100)	6
New Zealand (Listener)	7
Norway (VG-lista)	7
Singapore (Rediffusion)	1
South Africa (Springbok)	9
Switzerland (Schweizer Hitparade)	2
UK Singles (Official Charts)	4
US Billboard Hot 100	3
US Cash Box Top 100	3
West Germany (GfK)	1

=== Year-end charts ===
Chart (1972)	Rank
Denmark (IFPI)	12
UK (BMRB)	41

Chart (1973)	Rank
Canada (RPM)	17
US Billboard Hot 100	18

== Certifications ==
Region	Certification	Certified units/sales
United States (RIAA)	Gold	1,000,000^{^}
^{^} Shipments figures based on certification alone.

== Parody versions ==
Bob Rivers recorded a parody called "Little Billy's Willy", about President Bill Clinton and the Lewinsky scandal.
