= The Elastic Band =

Welsh band

- Origin: Cardiff, Wales
- Genre: Hard rock
- Years active: 1968–1971
- Past members: Andy Scott; Ted Yeadon; Mike Scott; Sean Jenkins

The Elastic Band was a Welsh rock music group band, formed in Wrexham in the 1960s. They were one of the exponents of the UK psychedelic rock scene from the late 1960s and featured Andy Scott who would go on to become guitarist with Sweet. Other members were August Eadon (Gus) who went by the name Ted Yeadon when he was a member of Elastic Band, Sean Jenkins (drums) and Mike Scott (bass; Andy's brother). The band broke up in 1970 when Yeadon accepted an offer to join Love Affair.

Gus Eadon joined the band Zzebra in 1974.

== Personnel ==
=== Former members ===
- Andy Scott – guitars (1968–1971)
- Mike Scott – bass (1968–1971)
- Sean Jenkins – drums (1968–1971)
- Ted Yeadon – organ, piano, flute, congas, harmonica, vocals (1968–1971)

== Discography ==
They released an album Expansions on Life (1969) and two singles on the Decca Nova label.

Album tracks:

Side 1

1. "Mother Goose"
2. "Last Person in the Bar"
3. "Crabtree Farm"
4. "Has Anybody Seen Her?"
5. "Dear John"

Side 2

1. "Room Full of Room"
2. "That's Nice"
3. "Life Still Goes On"
4. "Sad Jazz"
5. "Mapes's Sonatra"
6. "Sunrise Work Till Sunset"

All songs written by Andy Scott, Mike Scott, Sean Jenkins and Ted Yeadon

Single tracks:

1. Do Unto Others (written by Derek Hilton) // 8½ Hours Of Paradise (Mike Scott and Ted Yeadon) (1968)
2. Think Of You Baby (Barry Kingston and Eric Woolfson) // It's Been A Long Time Baby (Mike Scott and Ted Yeadon) (1968)

Personnel

- Ted Yeadon – organ, piano, flute, harmonica, congas, vocals
- Andy Scott – guitar
- Mike Scott – bass, tenor saxophone
- Sean Jenkins – drums, claves
