= Wig-Wam Bam =

Single by The Sweet

from the album The Sweet
- B-side: "New York Connection"
- Released: 1 September 1972
- Recorded: July 1972
- Studio: Audio International, London
- Genre: Glam rock; bubblegum; pop rock
- Length: 3:01
- Label: RCA
- Songwriters: Nicky Chinn; Mike Chapman
- Producer: Phil Wainman

The Sweet singles chronology
"Little Willy" (1972)	"Wig-Wam Bam" (1972)	"Blockbuster" (1973)

Official audio
- "Wig-Wam Bam" on YouTube

"Wig-Wam Bam" is a song by British glam rock band The Sweet, written by songwriters Nicky Chinn and Mike Chapman, released as a single in September 1972. It was the first Sweet single on which the band members actually played their instruments, as previous singles featured producer Phil Wainman on drums, and session musicians John Roberts and Pip Williams (later producer of Status Quo albums) on bass and guitars respectively.

== Lyrics ==
The song's lyrics are inspired by Henry Longfellow's Hiawatha poem from 1855. The poem tells the legend of a Native American warrior Hiawatha and his lover Minnehaha. The lyrics also refer to Running Bear and his lover Little White Dove, two characters from the 1959 song "Running Bear" written by Jiles Perry Richardson.

== Music ==
The song featured a significant change in the band's sound, and is often considered the band's first glam rock single. Also, this was the first Sweet single with bass player Steve Priest singing some parts of the lead vocal: the "try a little touch, try a little too much" line at the chorus. This became an important part of Sweet's later style; on most of their later singles they also used this technique, with Priest singing some lines of the song. After the song became a hit, Sweet adopted a glam image, starting to wear glitter and makeup.

The band appeared on BBC's Top of the Pops, performing the song, three times in 1972: on 14 September, on 21 September and on 5 October, with Priest wearing an extravagant Native American feathered headress.

== Personnel ==
- Brian Connolly – lead vocals
- Steve Priest – bass guitar, backing vocals
- Andy Scott – guitar, backing vocals
- Mick Tucker – drums, backing vocals

== Charts ==
Chart (1972–1973)	Peak position
Australia (Kent Music Report)	15
Austria (Ö3 Austria Top 40)	5
Belgium (Ultratop 50 Flanders)	3
Belgium (Ultratop 50 Wallonia)	10
Denmark (IFPI)	1
Finland (Suomen virallinen lista)	3
Ireland (IRMA)	4
Netherlands (Dutch Top 40)	6
Netherlands (Single Top 100)	6
New Zealand (Listener)	10
Norway (VG-lista)	6
Rhodesia (Lyons Maid)	1
South Africa (Springbok Radio)	8
Sweden (Kvällstoppen)	18
Switzerland (Schweizer Hitparade)	2
UK Singles (Official Charts)	4
US Cash Box Looking Ahead	14
West Germany (GfK)	3

== Cover versions ==
- In 1986, a cover by English pop band Black Lace was released as a single and reached number 63 on the UK Singles Chart.
- In 1989, a cover by English pop musician Damian was released as a single and reached number 49 on the UK Singles Chart.
- In 2000, all-female rock band The Donnas recorded a cover (with different, suggestive lyrics and no references to Hiawatha) for the Runnin' on Fumes!/The Gearhead Magazine Singles Compilation and Blockbuster: A 70's Glitter Glam Rock Experience. It was later released as a single in 2002.
- In 2000, the Swedish band Starz!? released a cover on their album Party, and on enhanced single "Wig Wam Bam".
- In 2010, the all-female Finnish hard rock band Barbe-Q-Barbies released a cover on the album All over You.

== In other media ==
The song was featured in the 2023 Hulu series Welcome to Chippendales.
