= Block Buster! =

Single by Sweet

from the album The Sweet
- B-side: "Need a Lot of Lovin'"
- Released: 5 January 1973
- Recorded: November 1972
- Studio: Audio International, London
- Genre: Glam rock; hard rock; blues rock; bubblegum
- Length: 3:13
- Label: RCA
- Songwriters: Nicky Chinn; Mike Chapman
- Producer: Phil Wainman

Sweet singles chronology
"Wig-Wam Bam" (1972)	"Block Buster!" (1973)	"Hell Raiser" (1973)

Video
- "Blockbuster" - Top Of The Pops on YouTube

"Block Buster!" (also sometimes listed as "Blockbuster!") is a 1973 single by The Sweet. Written by Nicky Chinn and Mike Chapman, and produced by Phil Wainman, "Block Buster!" was the band's sole UK No. 1 hit. Released in January 1973, it spent five weeks at the top of the UK Singles Chart, and also made No. 1 in the Netherlands, Germany, Austria and Ireland, and No. 3 in Finland, Switzerland, Denmark and Norway. Outside Europe it peaked at No. 1 in New Zealand, No. 29 in Australia and at No. 73 on the American Billboard Hot 100.

== Music and lyric ==
Its Muddy Waters-inspired blues riff is markedly similar to that featured on fellow RCA act David Bowie's "The Jean Genie", released shortly before, but all parties maintained this was a coincidence.

== TV performances ==
Some controversy arose after the band's performance of the song on the British television program Top of the Pops on 25 December 1973, for which bassist Steve Priest wore a swastika arm band, a painted Hitler moustache and a Pickelhaube.

== Personnel ==
- Brian Connolly – lead vocals
- Steve Priest – bass guitar, backing vocals
- Andy Scott – guitar, backing vocals
- Mick Tucker – drums, backing vocals

== Charts ==
Chart (1973)	Peak position
Australia (Kent Music Report)	29
Austria (Ö3 Austria Top 40)	1
Belgium (Ultratop 50 Flanders)	2
Belgium (Ultratop 50 Wallonia)	1
Canada Top Singles (RPM)	30
Denmark (IFPI)	1
Finland (Suomen virallinen lista)	3
Ireland (IRMA)	1
Netherlands (Dutch Top 40)	1
Netherlands (Single Top 100)	1
New Zealand (Listener)	1
Norway (VG-lista)	3
Rhodesia (Lyons Maid)	6
South Africa (Springbok Radio)	7
Switzerland (Schweizer Hitparade)	3
UK Singles (Official Charts)	1
US Billboard Hot 100	73
US Cash Box Top 100	43
West Germany (GfK)	1
