= Teenage Rampage =

Single by Sweet
- B-side: "Own Up, Take A Look At Yourself"
- Released: January 1974
- Genre: Glam rock; hard rock
- Length: 3:31
- Label: RCA Victor
- Songwriters: Nicky Chinn and Mike Chapman
- Producers: Nicky Chinn and Phil Wainman

Sweet singles chronology
"The Ballroom Blitz" (1973)	"Teenage Rampage" (1974)	"The Six Teens" (1974)

"Teenage Rampage" is a song by British glam rock band the Sweet. It was written by prolific songwriting duo Nicky Chinn and Mike Chapman.

The song was released as a single in January 1974 and reached number 1 in the Irish singles chart for two weeks in September 1974. It was also number 1 in West Germany and number 2 in Britain. On the New Zealand Listener chart it reached number 7. It was not released on a single or album in North America until the 1992 CD compilation The Best of Sweet.

== Reception ==
Gold Radio named it as Sweet's sixth best song, saying it "was inspired by the growing youth culture and rebellion in Britain at the time, and the lyrics express the frustration and anger of the teenagers who feel ignored and oppressed by the older generation."

Moral campaigner Mary Whitehouse wrote to BBC director-general Ian Trethowan to demand its immediate ban, saying it was "inadvisable in the present circumstances" for a song promoting teenage revolution to be played on the radio; the UK was experiencing a recession, industrial strife as well as the ongoing Troubles. Trethowan refused, saying that the song was harmless on account of being "totally empty of real content – like all too much pop music."
