= The Ballroom Blitz =

1973 single by The Sweet

- Cover of the 1973 German single issue

Single by The Sweet

from the album Desolation Boulevard (US version)
- B-side: "Rock and Roll Disgrace" (RCA); "Restless" (Capitol)
- Released: 14 September 1973
- Recorded: 1973
- Genre: Glam rock; hard rock; power pop
- Length: 4:06
- Label: RCA (UK); Capitol (US)
- Songwriters: Nicky Chinn; Mike Chapman
- Producer: Phil Wainman

The Sweet singles chronology
"Hell Raiser" (1973)	"The Ballroom Blitz" (1973)	"Teenage Rampage" (1974)

Promo video
- "The Ballroom Blitz" on YouTube

"The Ballroom Blitz" is a song by British glam rock band The Sweet, written by Nicky Chinn and Mike Chapman. The song reached number one in Canada, number two in the UK Singles Chart and the Australian Chart, and number five on the US Billboard Hot 100.

== Background ==
"The Ballroom Blitz" was inspired by an incident on 27 January 1973 when the band were performing at the Grand Hall in Kilmarnock, Scotland, and were driven offstage by a bottling.

== History and description ==
The song was recorded on 11–12 June 1973 at Audio International Studio, 18 Rodmarton Street, London, and released as a single in September 1973.

The song appeared on the US and Canadian versions of Desolation Boulevard but never appeared on a Sweet album in the UK, other than hits compilations.

The initial guitar riff and drum patterns of the song has similarity to a 1963 song by Bobby Comstock called "Let's Stomp".

== Cover versions ==
An early cover of "The Ballroom Blitz" was by the Les Humphries Singers in 1974, the first German single to reach number one in New Zealand. In 1979, the song was covered by the Damned, which featured Lemmy from Motörhead on bass guitar. It was released as a B-side to "I Just Can't Be Happy Today" and featured as a bonus track on their CD reissue of Machine Gun Etiquette.

Other covers include Krokus in 1984, the Surf Punks on their 1988 album Oh No! Not Them Again; and Tia Carrere on the soundtrack to Wayne's World in 1992. In 2003, the song was covered by the female Estonian rock band Vanilla Ninja. In 2016, The Struts recorded it for the soundtrack of film The Edge of Seventeen. In 2020, industrial metal band 3Teeth released Guns Akimbo, a two-track set that included a cover version of "The Ballroom Blitz". The song was previously featured in the 2019 action comedy film Guns Akimbo.

== Personnel ==
- Brian Connolly – lead vocals
- Steve Priest – bass guitar, co-lead and backing vocals
- Andy Scott – guitar, backing vocals
- Mick Tucker – drums, backing vocals

== Chart performance ==
=== Weekly charts ===
Chart (1973–1976)	Peak position
Argentina (Cash Box)	2
Australia (Go-Set National Top 40)	1
Australia (Kent Music Report)	2
Austria (Ö3 Austria Top 40)	5
Belgium (Ultratop 50 Flanders)	2
Belgium (Ultratop 50 Wallonia)	5
Canada RPM Top Singles	1
Finland (Finnish Singles Charts)	10
France (IFOP)	16
West Germany (GfK)	1
Iceland (Vísir)	1
Ireland (IRMA)	1
Netherlands (Single Top 100)	2
Netherlands (Dutch Top 40)	4
Norway (VG-lista)	2
South Africa (Springbok Radio SA Top 20)	3
Spain (AFYVE)	5
Sweden (Kvällstoppen)	3
Switzerland (Schweizer Hitparade)	3
UK Singles (Official Charts)	2
US Billboard Hot 100	5

=== Year-end charts ===
Chart (1973)	Rank
UK	17

Chart (1974)	Rank
Australia (Kent Music Report)	9

Chart (1975)	Rank
Canada	22
US Billboard Hot 100	16

== Certifications ==
Region	Certification	Certified units/sales
Canada (Music Canada)	Gold	75,000^{^}
New Zealand (RMNZ)	Gold	15,000^{‡}
United Kingdom (BPI)	Silver	250,000^{^}
^{^} Shipments figures based on certification alone.^{‡} Sales+streaming figures based on certification alone.
