= Brian Connolly =

Scottish singer-songwriter (1945–1997)

- Connolly, c. 1970s

Background information
- Born: Brian Francis Connolly; 5 October 1945; Hamilton, Lanarkshire, Scotland
- Origin: London, England
- Died: 9 February 1997 (aged 51) Slough, Berkshire, England
- Genres: Glam rock; hard rock; bubblegum pop; country rock
- Occupations: Musician; singer-songwriter; actor
- Instruments: Vocals, guitar, keyboards
- Years active: 1963–1996
- Labels: Polydor; Carrere; RCA
- Formerly of: Sweet

Brian Francis Connolly (5 October 1945 – 9 February 1997) was a Scottish singer-songwriter, musician and actor, best known as the lead singer of glam rock band Sweet between 1968 and 1979 and known for his charismatic stage presence and distinctive voice.

== Early life ==
Connolly was born in 1945 in Hamilton, South Lanarkshire. His mother, Frances Connolly, was a teenage waitress who left him in a Glasgow hospital as an infant. The identity of his biological father was never made public. Connolly was fostered at the age of two by Jim and Helen McManus of Blantyre, South Lanarkshire, and took their family name (as he was never adopted by them, his surname legally remained Connolly). The McManuses were the family of Mark McManus, of Taggart fame. Both men saw a resemblance between themselves and some supposed McManus's father to have also been Connolly's, particularly given the "desperation" perceived by other relatives and family friends that Jim McManus had to adopt his foster son.

Brian was known as Brian McManus until the age of eighteen when he found out that he had not been adopted and reverted to his biological mother's surname of 'Connolly'.

Connolly studied to become an engineer.

== Career ==
=== The Sweet ===
Connolly replaced singer Ian Gillan (later of Deep Purple fame) in a band called Wainwright's Gentlemen, which included drummer Mick Tucker.

Tucker and Connolly left Wainwright's Gentlemen in late 1967 and recruited guitarist Frank Torpey, and bassist Steve Priest, naming their new band the Sweetshop. On the eve of releasing their debut single, Slow Motion, in July 1968, the band shortened their name to the Sweet. They recorded a further three unsuccessful singles; Andy Scott joined the line-up in late 1970, just before the release of their first hit single "Funny, Funny." After this, Connolly was propelled into the limelight, with many appearances on Top of the Pops, with the other members of the Sweet.

In 1974, Connolly was badly beaten after leaving a nightclub in Staines where he received several kicks to his throat resulting in his being unable to sing for some time and permanently losing some of his previously wide vocal range. This incident also meant the band missed out on supporting The Who at Charlton Athletic Football Ground. Several songs on the Sweet Fanny Adams album had to be sung by other members of the band.

As time progressed, issues between Connolly and other members of Sweet developed and he would find the band excluding him from decisions. Connolly developed a significant problem with alcoholism in the mid-1970s. During 1977, when no tours were undertaken and two of Sweet's most successful albums were recorded, the power struggle within the band became even more apparent. Connolly's chronic alcohol abuse further compromised his role with the band as his voice began showing the impact in recordings and on stage during Sweet's 1978 US tour. He played his last British show with the classic Sweet line-up at Hammersmith Odeon, London on 24 February 1978. His final live performance with the band was in July 1978 in Florida, US, when they supported Alice Cooper. His departure was on 23 February 1979, and was made public the following month, March 1979.

=== After Sweet (1979–1983) ===
Connolly's next release was "Don't You Know a Lady", composed by Roger Greenaway. The song was recorded by British four-piece band Brooks shortly after Connolly's release. The track failed to make an impact. It was reported by UK music trade magazine Record Business, in their February 8 issue, that the single "Hypnotized" would be released in mid-March and that it was Connolly's first single in three years since he left the Sweet. Carrere then released the hard-rock single "Hypnotized", written by Joe Lynn Turner. A Fandango cover, the track was released in Europe with wide distribution by RCA but failed to chart. During this time Connolly recorded several new tracks for an album scheduled for release in August 1983.

In January 1983, Connolly supported Pat Benatar for three shows in Birmingham, Newcastle and the Hammersmith Odeon, London. Connolly's band Encore, included most of the members of Verity, fronted by ex-Argent guitarist John Verity, and Terry Uttley, the bass player from Smokie. Songs played included "Windy City", "Fox on the Run", "Hypnotized" and new numbers, "Sick and Tired", "Red Hair Rage" and "Burning the Candle". The new tracks were made available on a bootleg 7" single and CD.

The Inland Revenue served Connolly and the other members of the Sweet with a multimillion-pound tax assessment for the income earned from their hit records. Connolly sold his house to pay his share of the tax bill.

=== New Sweet and reunions ===
Brian Connolly's Sweet
- Also known as: New Sweet (1984–1987)
- Origin: United Kingdom
- Genres: Glam rock Hard rock
- Years active: 1984–1997
- Past members: Brian Connolly; Phil Ridden; Brian Rawson; Geoff Roots; Gary Farmer; Steve Turner; Michael Williams; Steve Berry; Neale Haywood; Martin Saunders; Dave Farmer; Steve Mulvey; Bjorn Hurrel; Mel Johnson; Glenn Williams; Martin Cook; Drew Murphy; Dave Glover; Russ Mahoney; Jeff King
- Website: Official webpage

From early 1984 onward, despite recurrent ill health, Connolly toured the UK and Europe with his band the New Sweet. His most successful concerts were annual appearances in West Germany, before and after Germany's reunification. He visited other countries including Denmark, and continued to perform sporadically in the UK. In 1985, Connolly separated from his wife Marilyn, with the divorce finalised in 1986.

During 1987, Connolly again encountered Frank Torpey, the original Sweet lead guitarist from 1968 to 1969. According to Torpey, Connolly was seeking a German recording deal. Torpey subsequently invited Connolly to record with him, as an informal project. Running late, Connolly turned up and the track "Sharontina" was recorded, but would not be released until Torpey's 1998 album, Sweeter.

In 1988, the producer Mike Chapman arranged for Connolly and former band members Mick Tucker, Steve Priest and Andy Scott to reunite in Los Angeles, California, and rework studio versions of "Action" and "The Ballroom Blitz". The reunion was with a view to producing a new album for MCA Records, however due to problems with Connolly's voice, the project failed and Connolly returned to the New Sweet.

In 1990, he reunited with the original Sweet line-up for the promotion of a music video documentary at Tower Records, London.

By July 1990, plans were made for Connolly and the New Sweet to tour Australia. A number of dates were planned, with the tour starting in Adelaide, and proceeded during November. The band played a show in Adelaide without Connolly. Other shows included one at the Dingley Powerhouse, with the final Australian show at Melbourne's Old Greek Theatre. It was decided that Connolly's health was sufficient reason for the tour not to be extended, and some of the later planned dates were abandoned. Connolly returned to England and his band appeared on The Bob Downe Christmas Show, on 18 December 1990.

On 22 March 1992, a heavy-duty tape recorder was stolen from the band's van while they were performing the Bristol Hippodrome with Mud.

Legal problems continued over use of the Sweet name between Connolly and Andy Scott. In something of a truce, both parties agreed to distinguish their group's name to help promoters and fans. The New Sweet became Brian Connolly's Sweet and Andy Scott's band became Andy Scott's Sweet.

In 1994, the New Sweet played in Dubai, and appeared at the Galleria Theatre, Hyatt Regency and Bahrain. By this time, Connolly had healed the differences with Steve Priest and Mick Tucker, and was invited to the wedding of Priest's eldest daughter, Lisa.

=== Let's Go and solo work (1995–1996) ===
In 1995, Connolly released a new album, Let's Go, backed up with merchandising. His partner Jean, whom he had met a few years earlier, gave birth to a son that year. In 1995, Jean succeeded in locating Connolly's biological family. An aunt in Ontario, Canada, revealed that Connolly's true birth mother had died in 1989. She also informed him that he had a living brother and sister.

On 2 November 1996, British TV network Channel 4 aired a programme Don't Leave Me This Way, which examined Connolly's time as a pop star with the Sweet, the subsequent decline in the band's popularity, and the impact on the band members. Connolly had suffered a series of heart attacks in 1981, and in the documentary was shaking constantly and walking with a limp. The show revealed Connolly's ill health, but also that he was continuing with his concert dates at Butlins, where Connolly and his band had appeared a number of times on tour during the early 1990s.

Connolly's final concert was at the Bristol Hippodrome on 5 December 1996.

== Health ==
In 1981, Connolly was hospitalised due to severe bloating. That same year, He sustained multiple heart attacks.

His health was permanently affected with some paralysis on his left side which would later develop into a neurological disorder. These problems were most likely related to Connolly's excessive alcohol consumption and heavy smoking, coupled with the use of prescription diuretic medicine.

== Personal life and death ==
Connolly was married and had two daughters, but the marriage was dissolved. He also had one son by Jean Dibble.

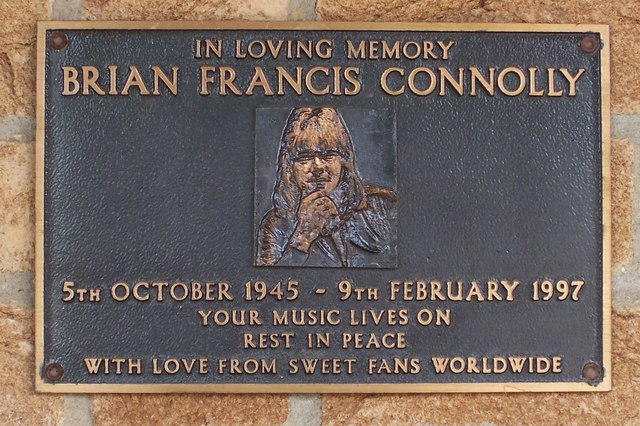
Plaque commemorating Connolly at Breakspear Crematorium, Middlesex

In January 1997, Connolly had a heart attack and was hospitalised in Slough. After a week in hospital, he discharged himself, but was readmitted the following week. Connolly died at Wexham Park Hospital on 10 February 1997. He was just 51.

On 17 February 1997, Connolly was cremated after a ceremony at Most Holy Name Roman Catholic Church at Old Mill Road, Denham, Buckinghamshire. His ashes were scattered over the water by his daughters Nicola and Michelle. He was also survived by his ex-wife, Marilyn, his girlfriend Jean and their one-year-old son Brian, born 26 May 1995.

In 2013, Connolly's son, Brian Jr., competed in the television talent show The X Factor.

== Band members ==
=== Personnel ===
==== Brian Connolly Band ====
- Brian Connolly – lead vocals (1979–1984)
- John Verity – guitar (1979–1984)
- Chas Cronk – bass (1979–1982)
- Tony Fernandez – drums, percussion (1979–1982)
- Dave Lambert – guitar (1979–1982)
- Brian Willoughby – guitar (1979–1982)
- Clive Barrett – guitar (1982–1984)
- Steve Rodford – drums, percussion (1982–1984)
- Terry Uttley – bass (1982–1984)

== Discography ==
=== As Brian Connolly ===
==== Singles ====
- "Take Away the Music" b/w "Alabama Man" (1980) – Polydor Records
- "Don't You Know a Lady" b/w "Phone You"(1980) – Polydor Records
- "Hypnotized" b/w "Fade Away" (1982) – Carrere Records, RCA Records

==== Albums ====
- Brian Connolly and the Sweet – Greatest Hits (1986) – new recordings of Sweet singles – Success Records
- Let's Go (1995) – Sweet re-recordings and three new post-Sweet tracks – Bam Records
- Take Away the Music (2004) – compilation of solo singles and demos – Malibu Records

==== Appears on ====
- Closed (Belgian psychedelic band) – guide vocals on "My Little Girl From Kentucky" and "Spider"
- "Remember December" by Paper Dolls – backing vocals (1970)
- High Life 20 Original Top Hits (1980) Polydor Germany – Features "Take Away the Music"
- Sweeter (1998) by Frank Torpey, CD Album – Notable for Brian Connolly's 1997 lead vocal track, "Sharontina" – Frankie Dean Records

=== List of songs ===
==== "Generation X" (aka the Troop) ====
Song	Writer(s)	Time	Producer	Album	Year	Other
My Opinion	Connolly	1.09	unknown	The Sweet – From the Vaults Volume 12		Early 1960s
On the spotlight	Connolly/Christopher Eldridge	1.29	unknown	The Sweet – From the Vaults Volume 12		Early 1960s
You'll Call My Name	Eddie Hill/Jean Branch	1.12	unknown	The Sweet – From the Vaults Volume 12; Various – Rare Mod Volume 5	2013	Early 1960s

==== "Wainwright's Gentlemen" ====
Song	Writer(s)	Time	Producer	Album	Year	Other
Ain't That Just Like Me	Billy Guy, Earl Carroll	2.40	unknown	Various – Rare Mod Volume 3	2011	produced in 1965

==== As Brian Connolly ====
Song	Writer(s)	Time	Producer	Album	Year	Other
Alabama Man	Brian Connolly, Mick Angus	3.46	Pip Williams	Take Away the Music	1980	
Burning the Candle	?	5.06	unknown	none	1983	
Don't You Know A Lady (When You See One)	Roger Greenaway, Mike Leander	4.56	Pip Williams	Take Away the Music	1980	First sung by Brooks (1980)
Fade Away	Brian Connolly, Brian Willoughby	3.24	John Verity	Take Away the Music	1982	
Hypnotized	Rick Blakemore, Bob Danyls, Dennis La Rue, Joe Lynn Turner	3.09	John Verity	Take Away the Music	1982	First sung by Fandango (1980), Not Fragile (2003) cover
Red Hair Rage	?	4.23	unknown	none	1983	
Phone You	Brian Connolly, Mick Angus	3.08	Brian Connolly	Take Away the Music	1980	
Sick And Tired	?	3.53	unknown	none	1983	
Take Away the Music	Brian Connolly, Mick Angus	3.47	Pip Williams	Take Away the Music	1980	

==== As Brian Connolly's Sweet ====
The "Old Sweet" material are new recordings.

Song	Writer(s)	Time	Producer	Album	Year	Other
Action	Connolly, Priest, Scott, Tucker	3.19	unknown	Greatest Hits	1986	
Block Buster	Chapman, Chinn	3.10	unknown	Greatest Hits	1986	
Burn on the Flame	Connolly, Priest, Scott, Tucker	4.14	unknown	Let's Go	1995	
Co-Co	Chapman, Chinn	2.28	unknown	Greatest Hits	1986/1997	
Do It Again	Brian Connolly, Johnny Earle	3.31	unknown	Let's Go	1995	
Elavita	?	?	unknown	Home Demos	2002	
Fox on the Run	Connolly, Priest, Scott, Tucker	3.33	unknown	Greatest Hits	1986	
Hell Raiser	Chapman, Chinn	3.14	unknown	Greatest Hits	1986	
Jailbait Fade Away	?	2.45	unknown	Take Away the Music	2002	
Lady	?	3.57	unknown	Take Away the Music	2002	
Let's go	Brian Connolly, Johnny Earle	4.25	unknown	Let's Go	1995	
Little Willie	Chapman, Chinn	3.13	unknown	Greatest Hits	1986	
Love Is Like Oxygen	Andy Scott, Trevor Griffin	3.53	unknown	Greatest Hits	1986	
Magic Circle	Brian Connolly, Trevor Griffin	4.12	unknown	The Definitive Brian Connolly's Sweet	2001	
Old Folks	?	3.12	unknown	Take Away the Music	2002	
Poppa Joe	Chapman, Chinn	3.13	unknown	Greatest Hits	1986/1997	
Rock & Roll Disgrace	Connolly, Priest, Scott, Tucker	3.46	unknown	The Definitive Brian Connolly's Sweet	2001	
Sunshine Days	?	3.07	unknown	Take Away the Music	2002	
Teenage Rampage	Chapman, Chinn	3.26	unknown	Greatest Hits	1986	
The Ballroom Blitz	Chapman, Chinn	4.09	unknown	Greatest Hits	1986	
The Final Show	?	3.25	unknown	Take Away the Music	2002	
The Sixteens	Chapman, Chinn	4.19	unknown	Greatest Hits	1986	
Wait 'Til the Morning Comes	Brian Connolly, Glen Williams	4.33	unknown	Let's Go	1995	
Wig-Wam Bam	Chapman, Chinn	3.34	unknown	Greatest Hits	1986	
