= Co-Co (Sweet song) =

1971 single by The Sweet

- German release picture sleeve

Single by The Sweet

from the album Funny How Sweet Co-Co Can Be
- B-side: "Done Me Wrong All Right"
- Released: 4 June 1971
- Recorded: 1971
- Genre: Bubblegum
- Length: 3:12
- Label: RCA Victor
- Songwriters: Nicky Chinn; Mike Chapman
- Producer: Phil Wainman

The Sweet singles chronology
"Funny, Funny" (1971)	"Co-Co" (1971)	"Alexander Graham Bell" (1971)

"Co-Co" is a song by English glam rock band The Sweet, released in 1971 as the second single from the band's debut album Funny How Sweet Co-Co Can Be. It was the Sweet's second single to chart in the UK after "Funny, Funny", peaking at No. 2 on the UK Singles Chart. Outside the UK, "Co-Co" reached No. 1 in the Flanders region of Belgium, South Africa, Switzerland and West Germany.

== Background ==
"Co-Co" was written by Nicky Chinn and Mike Chapman in 1971. The song was also given to Jackie Lee who sang it on her album Jackie's Junior Choice that same year.

== Charts ==
=== Weekly charts ===
Chart (1971–1972)	Peak position
Australia (Kent Music Report)	42
Belgium (Ultratop 50 Flanders)	1
Belgium (Ultratop 50 Wallonia)	2
Denmark (IFPI)	2
Finland (Suomen virallinen lista)	17
Ireland (IRMA)	3
Italy (Musica e dischi)	23
Netherlands (Dutch Top 40)	3
Netherlands (Single Top 100)	3
New Zealand (Listener)	2
Norway (VG-lista)	2
Rhodesia (Lyons Maid)	1
South Africa (Springbok Radio)	1
Spain (Promusicae)	3
Sweden (Kvällstoppen)	2
Switzerland (Schweizer Hitparade)	1
UK Singles (OCC)	2
US Billboard Hot 100	99
West Germany (GfK)	1

=== Year-end charts ===
Chart (1971)	Position
Belgium (Ultratop 50 Flanders)	10
Netherlands (Dutch Top 40)	23
Netherlands (Single Top 100)	33
South Africa (Springbok Radio)	2
Switzerland (Schweizer Hitparade)	6
