= Phil Wainman =

- Born: Philip Neil Wainman; 7 June 1946 (age 79); West London, England
- Genres: Pop, rock
- Occupations: Musician, songwriter, record producer, drummer
- Instrument: Drums
- Years active: 1960s–1980s

Philip Neil Wainman (born 7 June 1946, West London, England) is an English record producer and songwriter, primarily active in the 1970s. He is noted for his work with Sweet, XTC, Dollar, Mud, and the Bay City Rollers. His greatest chart success, however, was the production of "I Don't Like Mondays" by the Boomtown Rats, written by Bob Geldof and arranged by Fiachra Trench.

== Career ==
In 1964, Wainman was working the European cabaret circuit with a band called The High Grades. He returned to the UK and joined the Paramounts in 1965 for a short period. The Paramounts had had a minor UK hit with a cover of the Coasters' "Poison Ivy", but Wainman did not appear on this track. Wainman was also a drummer with a session band named The Quotations. They released two drum themed beat/pop singles, 1966's "Hear Me a Drummer Man" / "Hear Those Drums" and 1968's "Going, Going Gone" / "Hey Paradiddle".

He and pianist Harold Spiro later wrote the Yardbirds' "Little Games", which was produced by Mickie Most. Wainman was working as a music publisher and songwriter, when he was introduced to Middlesex-based pop group The Sweetshop. He produced the band's first single, "Slow Motion", which was released in July 1968. The band shortened its name to the Sweet just prior to the single being released. The track did nothing and he and the Sweet went their separate ways.

In 1970, Wainman was playing in a mainly-studio group called Butterscotch, who were enjoying chart success with "Don't You Know (She Said Hello)". He was approached by members of the Sweet, who asked him for songs. Wainman had made the acquaintance of a new songwriting duo Nicky Chinn and Mike Chapman, who were looking for an outlet for their work. The three parties came together, and went on to forge a partnership lasting four years. It created many worldwide hits, not only for the Sweet ("Funny Funny", "Co-Co", "Poppa Joe", "Little Willy", "Wig Wam Bam", "Blockbuster!" plus "Hell Raiser", "The Ballroom Blitz" and "Teenage Rampage"); but a host of other artistes, with Wainman producing the tracks.

However, in 1974 he left the Sweet and Chinn-Chapman and branched out on his own.

Wainman co-wrote and produced "Give a Little Love" for the Bay City Rollers, a UK number one in 1975. He also produced "Bye Bye Baby", another UK chart-topper the same year. In addition, record producer credits exist for the albums Bay City Rollers, Wouldn't You Like It? and Once Upon a Star.

When punk rock arrived, Wainman worked with Generation X, but it was not an experience he remembers with any affection: 'Billy Idol kept on saying, "Do you think I'm going to make it?" I said, "Well, you're absolutely bloody talentless, but you look great."

The last major hit Wainman worked on was Adrian Gurvitz's UK top 10 hit in April 1982, named "Classic". "And then I had an incident at home, where I got home one night at five o' clock in the morning, after I had been working, and there were six police cars in my driveway. You know the feeling when your heart jumps into your mouth? Well, my wife had been bound and gagged and [after that] I just figured if I had to risk my family's security because I'm in the studio – do I have to have an armed guard minding my family while I work? – so I just kind of gave up producing... I dropped out. But not because I wanted to, but because I felt I had to."

Wainman later went on to work in property and real estate management.

== See also ==
- List of record producers
