= Andy Scott (guitarist) =

Welsh guitarist and songwriter (born 1949)

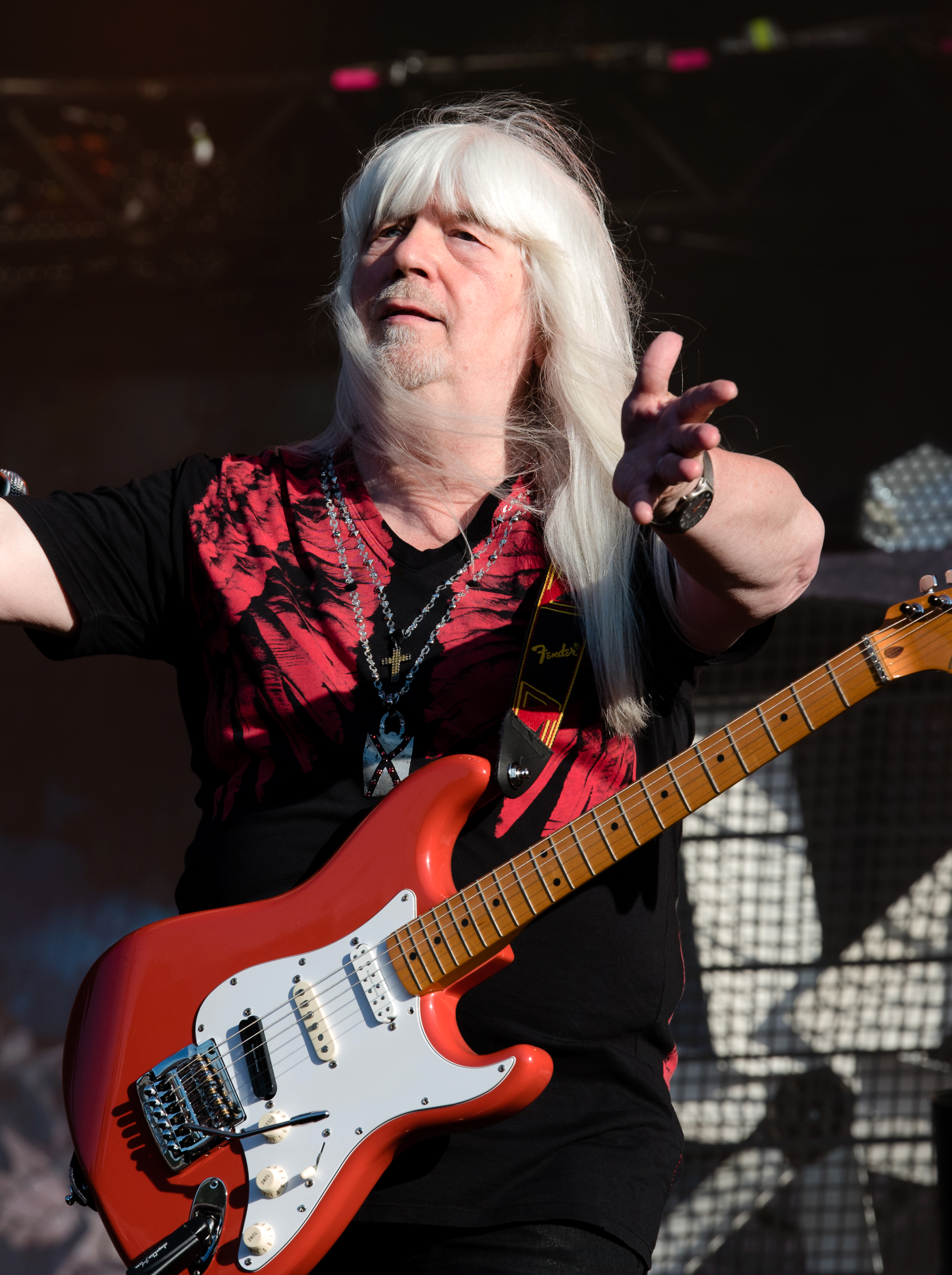
- Scott at Wacken Open Air 2018

Background information
- Born: Andrew David Scott; 30 June 1949 (age 77); Wrexham, Denbighshire, Wales
- Genres: Hard rock, glam rock
- Occupations: Musician, songwriter, producer
- Instruments: Guitar, bass, keyboards, vocals
- Years active: 1963–present

Andrew David Scott (born 30 June 1949) is a Welsh musician and songwriter. He is best known for being the lead guitarist and a backing vocalist in the glam rock band Sweet. Following bassist Steve Priest's death in June 2020, Scott is the last surviving member of the band's classic lineup.

== Early life ==
Andy Scott was born on 30 June 1949 in Wrexham, North Wales; his father was a children's entertainer. Scott attended Grove Park School. Scott became acquainted with the guitar when he was a teenager and a family friend, having bought a new guitar, left the old one at Scott's house; he started playing around with it. The first record Scott bought was "The Frightened City" by The Shadows and the first band he saw was The Searchers, who were performing in his home city of Wrexham.

== Career ==
=== Early career ===
Scott's first gig was at St Peters Hall in Wrexham with The Rasjaks in November 1963. He then performed with other bands in Wales such as Guitars Incorporated and 3Ds.

He moved to guitar and played with other bands including The Saints, The ForeWinds, and The Missing Links. In 1966 he joined The Silverstone Set (later shortened to The Silverstones), who won the TV show Opportunity Knocks five weeks running, and appeared in the all-winners show for Christmas 1966, losing to Freddie Starr. One of their further highlights was to support Jimi Hendrix in Manchester in January 1967.

When The Silverstones split, Scott went on to form The Elastic Band, who recorded an album called Expansions of Life. Lead singer Ted Yeadon left to join Love Affair, however, before the album's release, the band folded. During this time they also recorded the album Pop Sounds, under the name The Cool.

Scott then played in the backing band for The Scaffold, which also included brother Mike Scott on bass and saxophone. He went on to join Mayfield's Mule, who recorded three singles, "Drinking My Moonshine", "I See a River" and "We Go Rollin'". An album was also released in Uruguay called Mayfields Mule with the song titles translated on the sleeve into Spanish. He moved out of Wales in 1970 to go to London.

=== The Sweet (1970–1982) ===
In the late summer of 1970, Scott answered an advertisement in an issue of Melody Maker of a band looking for a new guitarist; the band was based around the corner from where Scott lived so he went. He passed the audition and replaced Mick Stewart in The Sweet after an audition in front of Brian Connolly, Steve Priest and Mick Tucker, as well as group managers Nicky Chinn and Mike Chapman. He was one of the last guitarists to audition. According to Steve Priest's autobiography Are You Ready Steve?, Scott turned up looking pretty untidy, with very long hair and scruffy clothes. He plugged his guitar in and immediately the amplifier began to feedback. He eventually performed his piece and the members of the band thought he should join The Sweet. On that same day, Scott had also auditioned for The Alan Bown Set.

Scott debuted with The Sweet at the Windsor Ballroom in Redcar, in September 1970.

Within six months of joining Sweet, they had their first hit, "Funny, Funny" which got to number 13 in the British chart, which was followed by "Co-Co", "Alexander Graham Bell", "Little Willy", and "Wig-Wam Bam". The band, who had previously been a psychedelic pop group, had started producing bubblegum pop records from Scott joining in 1970 until "Wig-Wam Bam" in 1972, from 1973 onwards they found higher fame as one of the leading glam rock artists, and had a number one with their first glam rock record, "Block Buster!".

Brian Connolly left in 1979 after the release of their last hit "Love Is Like Oxygen", and after contemplating on finding a new lead singer, Scott and Priest eventually both sang vocals. By 1982, Priest was living in America and Tucker did not want to tour anymore so they disbanded.

=== Solo career ===
Scott's first single release in 1975 was a reworked version of the Desolation Boulevard track "Lady Starlight" backed by "Where D'Ya Go?". Both songs, recorded during the Give Us a Wink sessions, were written and produced by Scott and Mick Tucker and featured Scott playing all instruments except the drums (Tucker). Scott made a promotional video for the track and also appeared on Mike Mansfield's British television program, Supersonic.

Scott released his second solo single, "Gotta See Jane", in 1983 under the name Ladders. It was a cover of the R. Dean Taylor Motown hit and was produced by him and Louis Austin, who had worked with Sweet as their engineer on past ventures. The B-side "Krugerrands", co-written with Chris Bradford, was subsequently released as the follow-up single (as Andy Scott this time), but like its predecessor, failed to chart, except in Australia where it peaked at number 89 and South Africa where it was a top 10 hit. In 1984, Scott released two more solo singles, "Let Her Dance" and "Invisible". A compilation of all his solo projects, including demos, was released by Repertoire Records in 1993, under the title 30 Years.

=== Paddy Goes to Holyhead and record production ===
Scott produced a couple of demos for Weapon, which was then fronted by Danny Hynes who went on to form Paddy Goes to Holyhead and Scott played with them now and again. Scott then produced, played on and appeared in the video for their single "Green Green Grass of Home" and then joined the band on a regular basis until reforming Sweet.

He produced the Suzi Quatro album, Back to the Drive, released in February 2006.

=== Andy Scott's Sweet (1985—) ===
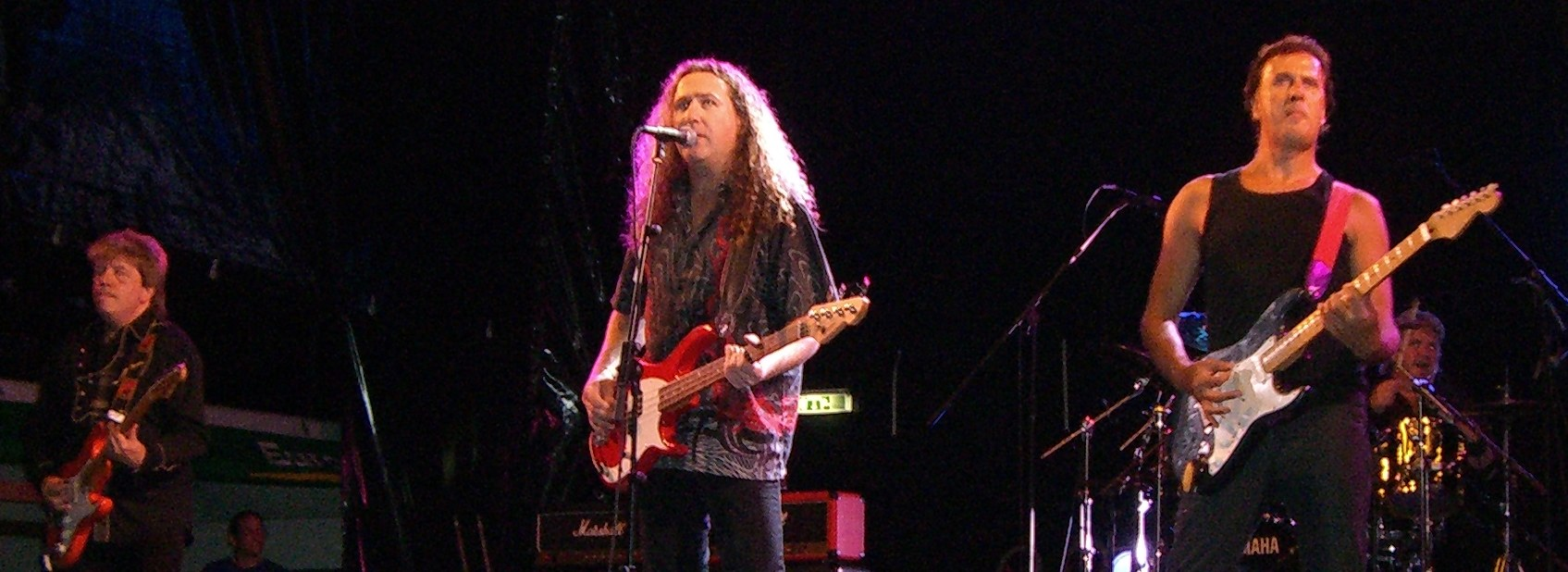
Andy Scott's Sweet in concert in Mainburg, Germany, September 2006 (Scott first from left)

In 1985 Scott and Tucker re-formed Sweet with new members Paul Day (ex-Iron Maiden) on lead vocals, Phil Lanzon (ex-Grand Prix now with Uriah Heep) on keyboards, and Mal McNulty (ex-Weapon) on bass. This band became "Andy Scott's Sweet" following Tucker's departure in 1991.

Andy Scott's Sweet have released six albums, A (1992), The Answer (1995), Sweetlife (2002), New York Connection (2012), Isolation Boulevard (2020) and Full Circle (2024). Scott has stated that Full Circle was to be the last studio album they put out.

For the 50th anniversary of the bands forming in 2018, Scott tried to do a reunion gig with Priest but this never happened.

Scott announced in 2024 that the band would embark on their final tour in Australia, as he wanted to cut back on how far he was travelling. Scott had to miss out on the Australian farewell, as well as the remaining 2024 dates, due to an undisclosed illness that included severe pain and being unable to even walk, that he first experienced in Hamburg, Germany. Scott resumed touring in early 2025.

=== Other work ===
In July 2010, Scott appeared in UK television adverts for the insurance company VanCompare.com. Three adverts were in circulation, featuring "Fox on the Run", "Love Is Like Oxygen", and "Action".

Scott was a main organiser of the first charity Rock Against Cancer concert in All Cannings, Wiltshire, in May 2012, which was headlined by Brian May, The Boomtown Rats, and Midge Ure. Concerts are still ongoing, in which Scott still plays an active role.

== Personal life ==
Scott has a son, Damian (born 1972) from his first marriage, who is now a sound engineer for The Sweet. Scott married his second wife, Maddy, in 1988. She left him in 2004 after his absence on a long tour of Australia. He has since remarried. When not touring Scott enjoys playing sports and fly fishing.

Scott lives in a converted barn at All Cannings, in the Vale of Pewsey, Wiltshire, which he bought for £100,000 and renovated for £300,000.

In September 2009, Scott was diagnosed with prostate cancer; following treatment, he was in remission.

== Discography ==
=== As Andy Scott ===
==== Albums ====
- Thirty Years: The Andy Scott Solo Singles (1993; Repertoire Records) (compilation of solo singles and demos)

==== Singles ====
- "Where D'Ya Go" / "Lady Starlight" (1975; RCA)
- "Lady Starlight" / "Where D'Ya Go" (1975; RCA)
- "Krugerrands" / "Face" (1984; Statik)
- "Let Her Dance" / "Suck It And See" (1984; Statik)
- "Invisible" / "Never Too Young" (1984; Statik)

==== 12" singles ====
- "Gotta See Jane" / "Gotta See Jane" (Radio Mix) (3:10) / "Krugerrands" (4:00)
- "Krugerrands" (Club Mix) (4:04) / "Face" (4:48) / "Krugerrands" (Single Edit) (3:40) / "Krugermental" (4:08)
- "Let Her Dance" (8:06) / "Let Her Dance" (Instrumental) (4:24) / "Suck It and See" (4:19)
- "Invisible" (7" Version) (3:54) / "Invisible" (Instrumental) (5:53) / "Invisible" (5:20) / "Never Too Young" (3:08)

=== With Ladders ===
==== Singles ====
- "Gotta See Jane" / "Krugerrands" (1983; Statik/Virgin)

=== With Andy Scott's Sweet ===
Starting at the year of 2000 only as "Sweet" again

==== Singles ====
- "X-Ray Specs" (1991; SPV)
- "Stand Up" (1992; SPV)
- "Am I Ever Gonna See Your Face Again" (1992; SPV) (1970's Australian chart hit, written by Brewster-Neeson-Brewster and recorded by band The Angels)
- "Do It All Over Again" (2002; Delicious Records)
- "Join Together" (2011; digital release) (a cover of The Who's 1972 chart single, written by Pete Townshend)
- "Let It Snow" (2011; digital release) (US # 1 for Vaughan Monroe in 1946; recorded by Bing Crosby, Frank Sinatra, Dean Martin et al., written by Sammy Cahn and Jule Styne)

==== Albums ====
Studio

- "A" (1992; SPV)
- The Answer (1995; SPV) (re-released different version of 'A' with extra tracks)
- Hannover Sessions (1996; Pseudonym) (4-CD set containing "A" recording sessions, "Alive And Giggin'", rarities with bonus video clips and "The Answer")
- Dangerous Game (1997; Chinebridge) (re-released version of 'The Answer')
- Chronology (2002; Delicious) (studio album with re-recordings of Sweet material)
- Sweetlife (2002; Delicious) (studio album of new material)
- New York Connection (2012) (studio album with cover songs)
- The Hits (2012) (studio album with re-recordings of Sweet material and "Let It Snow" as hidden bonus track (included in the track "Peppermint Twist"); digital download and cd version from the official web site)
- Full Circle (2024)

Live

- Live at the Marquee (1989; SPV/Maze) (double album which includes four new studio recordings; released as a recording by "Sweet"- as it also featured original member Mick Tucker)
- Alive and Giggin'! (1995; Pseudonym)
- Glitz, Blitz & Hitz (1996; CNR) (limited edition version with bonus tracks also released)
- Sweet Fanny Adams Revisited (2012) (digital download, cd version from the official web site and full release in March 2013)
- Desolation Boulevard Revisited (2012) (digital download and full release in March 2013; this is the same album as Sweet Fanny Adams Revisited, only with a different cover)
