= Steve Priest =

British bass player (1948–2020)

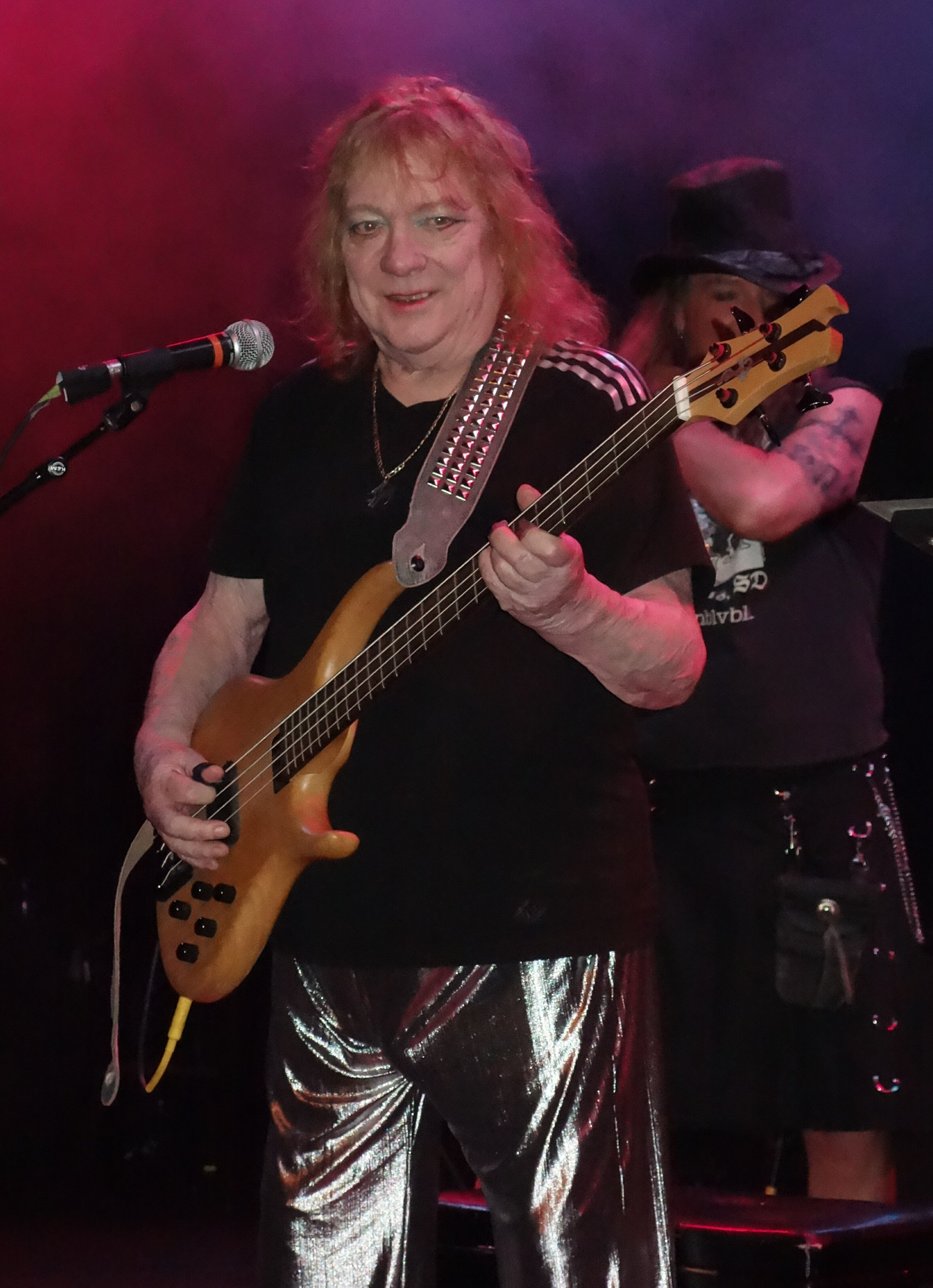
- Priest in Dubuque, Iowa in 2018

Background information
- Born: Stephen Norman Priest; 23 February 1948; Hayes, Middlesex, England
- Died: 4 June 2020 (aged 72) Los Angeles, California, United States
- Genres: Hard rock; glam rock; heavy metal
- Occupations: Musician; songwriter
- Instruments: Bass; vocals
- Years active: 1962–2020
- Formerly of: The Sweet
- Website: thesweet.com

Stephen Norman Priest (23 February 1948 – 4 June 2020) was an English musician who was the bassist (and, later, co-lead vocalist) of the glam rock band The Sweet.

== Early life ==
Priest was born in Hayes, Middlesex. He made his own bass guitar and began playing in local bands as a young teenager, after being influenced by artists such as Jet Harris of the Shadows, the Rolling Stones and The Who.

== Sweet ==
In January 1968, Priest was invited to form a four-piece band with vocalist Brian Connolly, drummer Mick Tucker, and guitarist Frank E. Torpey – the band that was to become The Sweet. Torpey was replaced by Mick Stewart in July 1969. Guitarist Andy Scott joined in August 1970, following Stewart's departure and the classic line-up was established.

The Sweet was a band that went through many ups and downs. Initial success for The Sweet began in 1971, after the band teamed up with songwriters Nicky Chinn and Mike Chapman. However, The Sweet would pen a number of their own hits. Priest often directly backed up Brian Connolly's vocals and took distinctive short high pitched vocal leads which was a key to their musical style at that time. He adopted a camp image, wearing heavy make-up and outrageous costumes.

Priest recalled talking to David Bowie backstage on Top of the Pops: "I was plastering this make-up on, and Bowie's going: 'Oh no, no, no. You've got to be subtle.' Bowie just didn't get it. It isn't supposed to be subtle. I'm supposed to look like an old tart."

Some controversy arose after the band's performance of the hit song "Block Buster!" on the BBC's Top of the Pops on 25 December 1973, for which Priest wore a swastika arm band. He appeared in German military uniform on the 1973 Christmas edition of the show. The song was named after the Allied blockbuster bomb. In 2010 Priest said: "It's amazing how everyone still talks about the Nazi uniform... Good old BBC wardrobe department. People always want to know if I was serious. I mean, a gay Hitler. Hello?!"

After Brian Connolly left The Sweet in early 1979, Priest became the main singer. This continued until 1982, when the original Sweet disbanded.

Invited in 1985 by former bandmate Andy Scott to reform the Sweet, Priest declined.

== Later career ==
During the 1980s, Priest largely reverted to private life but made occasional forays into production and session work, as well as collaborations with other artists such as David Arkenstone and future bandmate Stuart Smith.

Priest had a demo session in Los Angeles with the other members of the original Sweet in 1988, with Mike Chapman producing, to see if a studio album and reformation were possible. The band did not agree on terms and the project failed. Despite the difficulties of the late '70s, Priest continued his friendship with former Sweet lead singer Connolly, who was by now in poor health.

In 1994, Priest published his autobiography, Are You Ready Steve?, the title of which is taken from the intro to the Sweet's "The Ballroom Blitz" when Brian Connolly counts in the song with "Are you ready Steve? ...Andy? ...Mick? ...Alright fellas, let's gooooo!", and in 2006, he released a CD titled Priest's Precious Poems. In January 2008, Priest formed a new version of the Sweet, not related to Andy Scott's version of the band.

This new band played mainly festivals and venues in the U.S. and Canada. In early 2009, the band released a live CD, recorded in August 2008 at the Morongo Casino in Cabazon, California.

While in New York, he formed a band called the Allies with guitarist Marco Delmar and drummer Steve Missal. Success was elusive, although their composition "Talk To Me" was featured in a film, Fast Food.

== Personal life ==
By the time Sweet had disbanded, Priest had divorced his first wife, Pat, and moved to New York City. On 18 June 1981, he married his second wife Maureen (née O'Connor), who was then East Coast Director of Publicity and Artist Relations for Capitol/EMI Records in New York.

Shortly after 1985, Priest and his family relocated to Los Angeles.

In his later years, Priest lived with his wife Maureen O'Connor and two daughters in La Cañada Flintridge, California.

He died on 4 June 2020, aged 72. Steve Priest was cremated and his ashes are interred at Forest Lawn Memorial Park, Glendale, California.

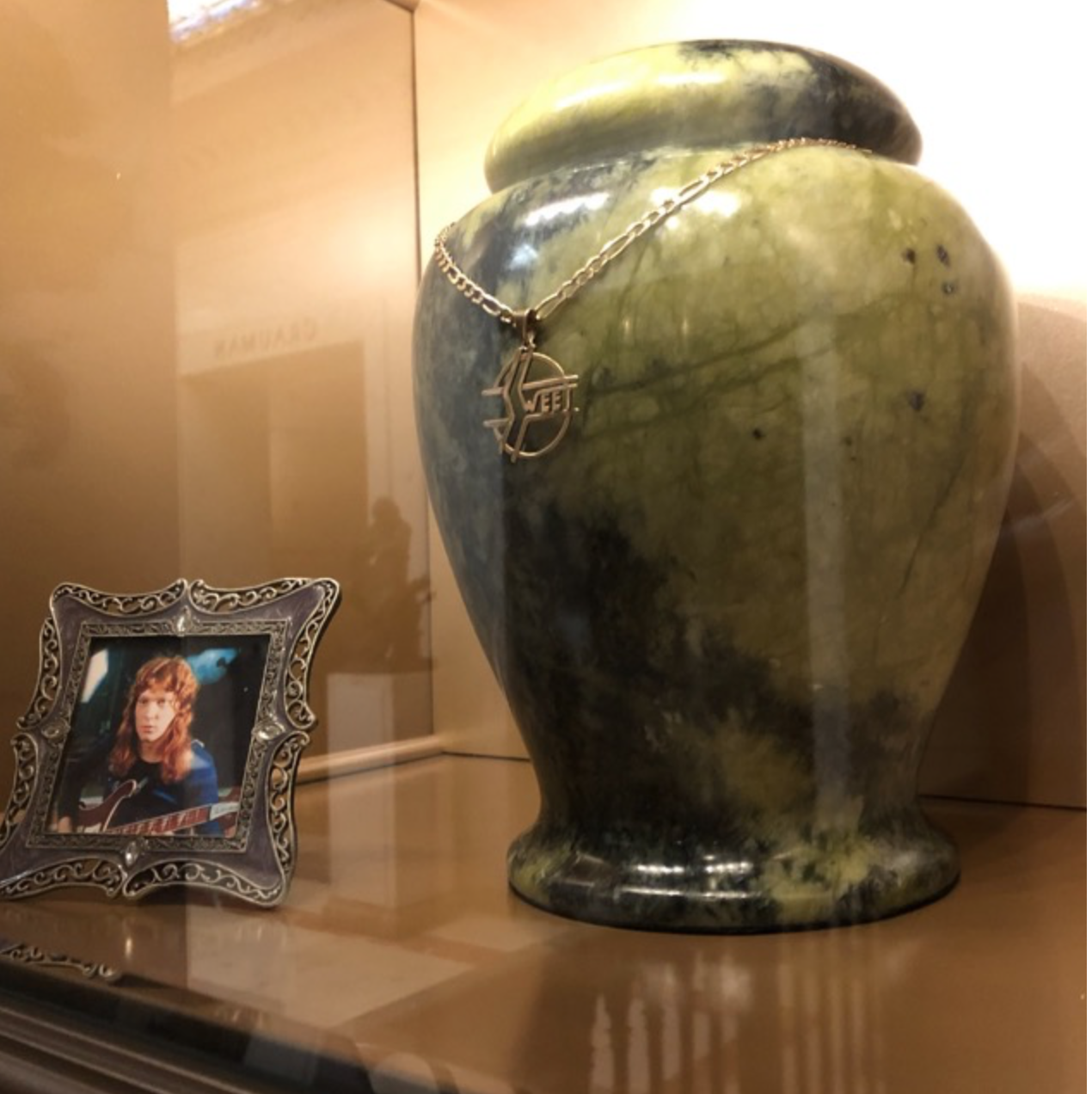
Steve Priest's ashes
