= Mick Tucker =

British drummer (1947–2002)

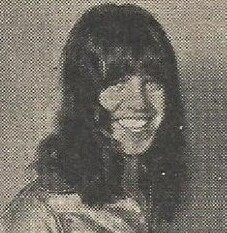
- Tucker in 1972

Background information
- Born: 17 July 1947; Kingsbury, London, England
- Died: 14 February 2002 (aged 54) Welwyn Garden City, Hertfordshire, England
- Occupation: Drummer
- Formerly of: Sweet

Michael Thomas Tucker (17 July 1947 – 14 February 2002) was an English musician, best known as the drummer of the glam rock and hard rock band Sweet.

== Personal life ==
Mick Tucker was born on 17 July 1947 in Kingsbury, North West London, the son of Hubert and Ellen Tucker. He was married twice: to Pauline until her death in 1979, and to Janet until his death. He died from leukaemia on 14 February 2002, in Welwyn Garden City, Hertfordshire.

On 28 July 1973, Tucker married his first wife, Pauline, at the Church of the Sacred Heart in Ruislip, Middlesex. They then moved into a house in Beverley Road, Ruislip.

He had a music room with silver and gold albums awarded from all over the world on the walls.

== Bands ==
By the age of 18 (1965), Tucker had embarked on a career in pop music, playing around pubs and clubs in a band called Wainwright's Gentlemen and was later joined by vocalist Brian Connolly playing a mixture of R&B, Motown, and early psychedelic sounds. The band split in 1968. There are a number of recordings in existence including a cover of The Coasters'/The Hollies' hit "Ain't That Just Like Me", which was officially released in February 2011 on a compilation CD "Rare Mod, Volume 3" on the Acid Jazz label (AJXCD 238). The track features Tucker on drums and, according to band bassist Jan Frewer, is thought to have been recorded in 1965.

He was a founding member of the band Sweetshop in January 1968 along with Connolly, Steve Priest and Frank Torpey (born 30 April 1947, Kilburn, North West London), later replaced by Mick Stewart, himself succeeded by Andy Scott. "Sweetshop" was shortened to "The Sweet" in 1968.

== Drumming style ==
As a boy, his first interest was drawing. By fourteen, he had changed his interest to the drums, influenced by Sandy Nelson, Buddy Rich, and Gene Krupa. Tucker's father offered him a drum kit but only if he would take drumming seriously. Hubert Tucker encouraged his son, even getting him his first gig, sitting in for Brian Bennett of legendary British beat group The Shadows at a local working men's club. "He did well," says Tucker's wife, Janet. "If he had known who he was replacing, he would have been so scared!"

A self-taught drummer, Tucker excelled, and by eighteen, he was playing in the band Wainwright's Gentlemen. When Tucker was sacked in January 1968 for being "too flamboyant", singer Brian Connolly said "I am leaving as well." The two looked for new band-mates, and the band Sweetshop was soon formed.

According to Steve Priest's 1994 autobiography, Are You Ready, Steve?, Tucker offered his feedback while recording "The Six Teens", and songwriter/producer Mike Chapman said, "We don't f**king need you anyway, Mick!" Tucker ended the argument by saying, "If you don't need us, why don't you just put that tape player on 'record' and erase the whole track?" He was serious when it came to making music, and he stood up for his band's integrity when necessary.

Tucker was a consummate drummer with a range of complex rhythms who could have helped any band considerably. Steve Priest said of Tucker, "He was the most underrated drummer that ever came out of England... He was the powerhouse of the band. He was technically marvelous. His timing was impeccable, but he had a lot of soul as well and he really felt what he was playing."

== Drum kit ==
From late 1972 onward, Tucker used the same drum kit, a Ludwig chrome-over-wood eight-piece set. The twirl of his sticks were as much a trademark as the drum kit itself. Tucker used a five-piece Ludwig while on tour in Belgium. After the tour ended, he added the set to the existing Ludwig four-piece set he already had. He then re-wrapped them all in chrome. The Ludwig set contained:

- 2 – 14″×22" bass drums
- 2 – Speed king 201 bass drum pedals
- 1 – 12″x8″ tom-tom
- 1 – set of two 13″x9″ tom–toms
- 1 – set of Two 16″x16″ floor toms
- 1 – 14″ Supraphonic snare drum
- His cymbal stands were the Ludwig Hercules stands (that were specially manufactured for Tucker by Ludwig).

Cymbals Paiste (Formula 602):

- 1 – Dark hi-hat (14")
- 1 – Mellow Ride (20")
- 1 – set of 2 Dark Crash (18", 20")
- 1 – Short Crash (18")

The drum sticks he used from the early '80s were the Promark American Hickory 419. Tucker had his sticks printed with the Sweet logo and his autograph.

== Drum solos ==
Tucker was able to improvise tirelessly and played a seemingly never-ending flow of creative solos. He began and ended his drum solos with his rendition of Elmer Bernstein's theme from the 1955 film The Man With the Golden Arm.

Tucker also used two projection screens that were above his drum riser. One screen played a video of him playing the drums, and simultaneously the other video showed him playing timpani. He would trade off solos with these videos, then come out front and play the timpani along with a fast Christmas-style recording. Just before the band would come back, he would play the Bernstein melody on tubular bells and timpani. Tucker tried to make sure his solos appealed to all of the audience. He understood that a great performance consisted of great playing technique and presentation in equal doses.

Tucker said of his band Sweet, "At gigs, Andy would mince onstage swinging a handbag and call himself Andre. Steven became Stephanie and I changed my name to Michelle. Brian was the only one who never really went along with the make-up thing."

== Legacy ==
Adding to bassist Steve Priest's high appreciation, guitarist Andy Scott said "Mick Tucker was the best drummer around in the '70s. I played in the same band as him and was proud to do so. I feel extreme sadness therefore that he has now left us and my heart goes out to Janet and Aiston with their sad loss."

Cheap Trick drummer Bun E. Carlos remembered that Sweet opened for the band in 1979. "On most nights we went side stage and watched them. They were rockin' live, and Mick was fun to watch. His style reminded me of an early Keith Moon. Mick was one of the few double bass drummers that didn't let the second bass drum get in the way of a swinging tune like 'Ballroom Blitz.' He had a great feel on double bass drum, played them effortlessly... And those guys knew how to have fun," Carlos said. "We'd call them back on stage during our encores and jam on 'Let It Rock'. Mick would play my kit with the 26" bass drum and just rock out with us. I'd hop up on the riser with him, playing guitar and watching him play. We had some great times together."

Other drummers who were influenced by Tucker are Jack Irons (Red Hot Chili Peppers, Pearl Jam, The Wallflowers), Snowy Shaw (King Diamond, Dream Evil, Mercyful Fate), and Jason Hartless (Ted Nugent).

Irons stated of Tucker, "Mick was a great drummer... He had that fluid, '60s/'70s rock 'n' roll freedom. His drumming was super-tight and musical, technical, and rocking."

Shaw said of Tucker, "Mick's tastefulness, precision, and strong signature put him at the very top of the list of drumming heroes I had when I was trying to master the profession," he says. "Technically, he was right up there with Ian Paice and John Bonham. Like a kid in a candy store, I devoured his selection of trademark tricks and licks, which he delivered so musically, and with conviction and grace like no one else.

== Death ==
Tucker died on 14 February 2002 in Welwyn Garden City, Hertfordshire, from leukaemia, aged 54. His funeral took place on 25 February 2002. His wife Janet, his daughter Aiston and his niece Angela were at his bedside when he died. He is buried in an unmarked grave in Chorleywood House cemetery. A wooden bench with a brass plaque funded by fans as a dedication to Tucker is also positioned in the grave's vicinity.

Five years previously, Tucker had a bone marrow transplant from his brother to combat his leukaemia. He had recurring infections before succumbing to the illness at the hospital in Welwyn Garden City.

"He went into remission after the operation, but he's never been that strong since", band bassist Steve Priest said. "This has taken everyone by surprise... He was the best drummer England ever produced and it is a sad loss to the music world. It was a little bit sudden, to be honest. He was on the verge of leukaemia five years ago but had a bone marrow transplant from his brother, which stopped him getting it, but he was never the same."
