= Nicky Chinn =

British-American songwriter and producer (born 1945)

- Born: Nicholas Barry Chinn; 16 May 1945 (age 81); London, England
- Genres: Pop; glam rock
- Occupations: Songwriter; record producer
- Years active: 1970s–present

Nicholas Barry Chinn (born 16 May 1945) is a British-American songwriter and record producer. Together with Mike Chapman he had a long string of hit singles in the US and UK in the 1970s and early 1980s, including several international number-one records. The duo wrote hits for the Sweet, Suzi Quatro, Mud, New World, Arrows, Racey, Smokie, Tina Turner, Huey Lewis and the News, Exile and Toni Basil.

== Career ==
Chinn was born in London to an affluent Jewish family that owned a string of service stations and car sales distributorships. As a young man his talent for writing successful pop songs was obvious and within a month or two of his first efforts as a songwriter, Chinn co-wrote with Mike d'Abo the two main songs for the hit film, There's a Girl in My Soup (1970).

It was at this point that Chinn met Australian-born Mike Chapman, who was a waiter at a night club Chinn frequented, and they decided to team up. Chapman was already a professional musician and songwriter with the band Tangerine Peel, and the two quickly joined up with Mickie Most's RAK label. They began writing songs for a new glam rock band, The Sweet, and their compositions accounted for all the singles the band released in their early years.

Chinn's and Chapman's songwriting style was so successful with British and worldwide audiences that Sweet had an uninterrupted string of million-selling hits in the next few years. These included "Co-Co", "Little Willy", "Wig-Wam Bam", "Blockbuster!" "The Ballroom Blitz", "Hell Raiser" and "Teenage Rampage". "Ballroom Blitz" entered the UK Singles Chart at number two – an unusual feat. "Little Willy" and "Ballroom Blitz" both went on to be top five hits in America.

Chinn and Chapman stopped working with Sweet in 1975 but achieved equal success worldwide with Suzi Quatro, for whom they wrote many hits. These included "48 Crash" and the No.1 singles "Can the Can" and "Devil Gate Drive". Chinn and Chapman found their next big success with Mud, who had hits with a number of their compositions between 1973 and 1975, including two number ones in "Tiger Feet" and "Lonely This Christmas". Smokie became Chinn and Chapman's next project and they had a number of hit singles with them between 1975 and 1978 including the worldwide hit "Living Next Door to Alice".

In 1978, the two scored their first number one in the United States with Exile's "Kiss You All Over", and Suzi Quatro's duet with Smokie's lead singer Chris Norman, "Stumblin' In", reached number four in the same year. In 1982 "Mickey" by Toni Basil gave the two their second American number one, and in the mid 1980s they had top ten hits with Tina Turner's "Better Be Good to Me", and Huey Lewis's "Heart and Soul".

== 1980s–2000s ==
Chinn and Chapman gradually separated during the early 1980s, finally splitting up in 1983. Chinn's 12-year stint with Chapman had made him co-writer of over fifty Top 40 hits. In 1983 he co-wrote "Dancing in the Dark", a UK hit for Kim Wilde.

During their careers they were recipients of three Ivor Novello Awards for songwriting, including the Jimmy Kennedy award for outstanding career achievement in 1997.

During the late 1980s and throughout the 1990s, Nicky Chinn suffered from ill health causing an enforced break in his career. He returned in 2004 and started working with various writers including Jorgen Elofsson, and they wrote "You Must Have Had a Broken Heart" for Westlife's 2006 album Back Home, which went to number one in the UK Albums Chart selling over a million copies.

Chinn now spends time in Nashville, Tennessee, working with many writers there. He co-wrote "Live Like There's No Tomorrow" recorded by Selena Gomez for her 2010 album, A Year Without Rain, which debuted at number 4 on the Billboard Top 200 albums chart. The song was also featured in her Disney film Ramona and Beezus. Also while in Nashville he co-wrote "A Beautiful Life", which was recorded by Donny and Marie Osmond for their 2010 album, Donny & Marie.

== Singles ==
- 1971:

New World: "Tom Tom Turnaround", "Kara, Kara"
The Sweet: "Funny Funny", "Co-Co", "Alexander Graham Bell"

- 1972:

Peter Noone: "Shoo Be Doo Ah"
New World: "Sister Jane", "Living Next Door to Alice",
The Sweet: "Poppa Joe", "Little Willy", "Wig-Wam Bam"

- 1973:

Mud: "Crazy", "Hypnosis", "Dyna-mite"
New World: "Rooftop Singing"
Suzi Quatro: "Can the Can", "48 Crash", "Daytona Demon"
The Sweet: "Block Buster!", "Hellraiser", "The Ballroom Blitz"

- 1974:

Arrows: "Touch Too Much", "Toughen Up"
Mud: "Tiger Feet", "The Cat Crept In", "Rocket", "Lonely This Christmas"
Suzi Quatro: "Devil Gate Drive", "Too Big", "The Wild One"
The Sweet: "Teenage Rampage", "The Six Teens", "Turn It Down"

- 1975:

Mud: "The Secrets That You Keep", "Moonshine Sally" (originally recorded in 1972),
Suzi Quatro: "Your Mama Won’t Like Me", "I Bit Off More Than I Could Chew"
Smokie: "Pass It Around" "If You Think You Know How to Love Me", "Don't Play Your Rock 'n' Roll to Me"

- 1976:

Smokie: "Something's Been Making Me Blue", "Wild Wild Angels", "I'll Meet You at Midnight", "Living Next Door to Alice"

- 1977:

Exile: "Try it On"
Smokie: "Lay Back in the Arms of Someone", "It's Your Life",
Suzi Quatro: "Tear Me Apart"

- 1978:

Exile: "Kiss You All Over", "You Thrill Me"
Smokie: "For a Few Dollars More", "Oh Carol"
Suzi Quatro: "If You Can't Give Me Love"
Suzi Quatro and Chris Norman: "Stumblin' In"
Racey: "Lay Your Love on Me"

- 1979:

Exile: "How Could This Go Wrong", "The Part of Me That Needs You Most"
Racey: "Some Girls"
Suzi Quatro: "Don't Change My Luck", "She’s in Love with You"

- 1981:

Exile: "Heart and Soul"
Toni Basil: "Mickey"

- 1983:

Huey Lewis and the News: "Heart and Soul"

- 1984:

Tina Turner: "Better Be Good to Me"

- 2024:

Cyril: "Stumblin' In"

Rosé and Bruno Mars: "Apt."
