= Collected (Black 'n Blue album) =

Box set by Black 'n Blue
- Released: 2005
- Genre: Glam metal
- Label: Majestic Rock Records

Black 'n Blue chronology
Live In Detroit – 1984 (2002)	Collected (2005)	Rarities (2007)

Collected is a five disc Black 'N Blue box set, released in 2005, with 4 audio CDs and one DVD. This release contains the first four studio albums released by the hard rock/ glam metal band, Black 'n Blue. The DVD contains an entire live concert performed by Black 'n Blue, containing most of Black 'n Blue's hits, while also including a few songs that were never released on any Black 'n Blue disc. These include "Run Run", "Summer Heat", and "Rock n' Roll Animals", which later became "Rockin On Heaven's Door".

== Track listing ==
=== Disc 1 ===
1. "Strong Will Rock"
2. "School Of Hard Knocks"
3. "Autoblast"
4. "Hold On to 18"
5. "Wicked Bitch"
6. "Action"
7. "Show Me The Night"
8. "One For The Money"
9. "I'm The King"
10. "Chains Around Heaven"

=== Disc 2 ===
1. "Rockin' On Heaven's Door"
2. "Without Love"
3. "Stop The Lightning"
4. "Nature Of The Beach"
5. "Miss Mystery"
6. "Swing Time"
7. "Bombastic Plastic"
8. "We Got The Fire"
9. "Strange Things"
10. "Two Wrongs (Don't Make It Love)"

=== Disc 3 ===
1. "Nasty Nasty"
2. "I Want It All, I Want It Now"
3. "Does She Or Doesn't She"
4. "Kiss Of Death"
5. "12 O'Clock High"
6. "Do What You Wanna Do"
7. "I'll Be There For You"
8. "Rules"
9. "Best In The West"

=== Disc 4 ===
1. "Rock On"
2. "Sight For Sore Eyes"
3. "Heat It Up! Burn It Out!"
4. "Suspicious"
5. "Snake"
6. "Live It Up"
7. "Gimme Your Love"
8. "Get Wise To The Rise"
9. "Great Guns Of Fire"
10. "Stranger"

=== Disc 5 (DVD) ===
1. "Chains Around Heaven"
2. "One For The Money"
3. "Show Me The Night"
4. "Summer Heat"
5. "Run Run"
6. "Autoblast"
7. "Action"
8. "Strong Will Rock"
9. "Hold On to 18"
10. "Violent Kid"
11. "Rock'N'Roll Animals"
12. "Wicked Bitch"
13. "School Of Hard Knocks"
14. "I'm The King"
15. "Lip Lock"
16. "Sign In Blood"

== Personnel ==
- Jaime St. James: Lead Vocals
- Tommy Thayer: Guitar, keyboards
- Jeff Warner: Guitar
- Patrick Young: Bass
- Pete Holmes: Drums
