= Live in Detroit – 1984 =

Live album by Black 'n Blue
- Released: December 2001
- Recorded: Detroit, Michigan, 1984
- Genre: Glam metal
- Length: 50:54
- Label: Krazy Planet (US, 2001); Zoom Club Records (UK, 2002)

Black 'n Blue chronology
Ultimate Collection (2001)	Live in Detroit – 1984 (2001)	Collected (box set) (2005)

Zoom Club edition cover

Professional ratings
Review scores
Source	Rating
Allmusic	3.5/5 stars

Live in Detroit – 1984 is the second live album by the American glam metal band Black 'n Blue, released in 2002.

== Track listing ==
1. "Chains Around Heaven" - 4:51
2. "Action" - 4:37
3. "Autoblast" - 5:17
4. "The Strong Will Rock" - 7:58
5. "Hold On to 18" - 4:57
6. "Wicked Bitch" - 4:36
7. "School of Hard Knocks" - 6:46
8. "I'm the King" - 5:28
9. "One for the Money" - 6:24

== Personnel ==
- Jaime St. James - lead vocals
- Tommy Thayer - guitars, keyboards, backing vocals
- Jeff Warner - guitar, backing vocals
- Patrick Young - bass, backing vocals
- Pete Holmes - drums
