= B-stage =

Secondary stage in an arena or stadium

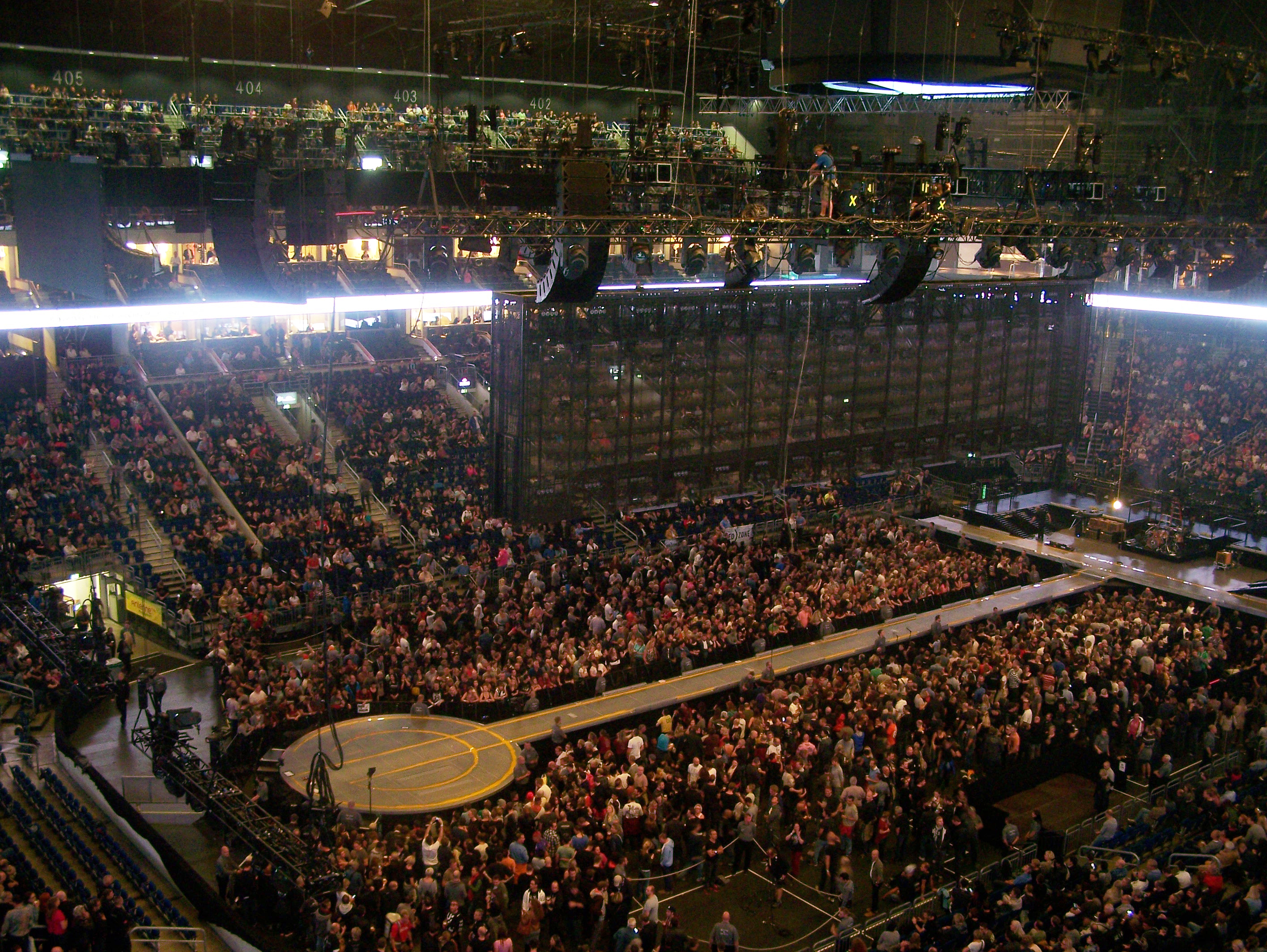
An example of a B-stage from U2's Innocence + Experience Tour. The circular B-stage (left) connects to the main stage (right) by a walkway.

A B-stage is a small, secondary stage, featured at pop and rock concerts held in arenas and stadia, and is usually located in the middle of the concert floor, connected to the main stage by a walkway.

== Origins ==
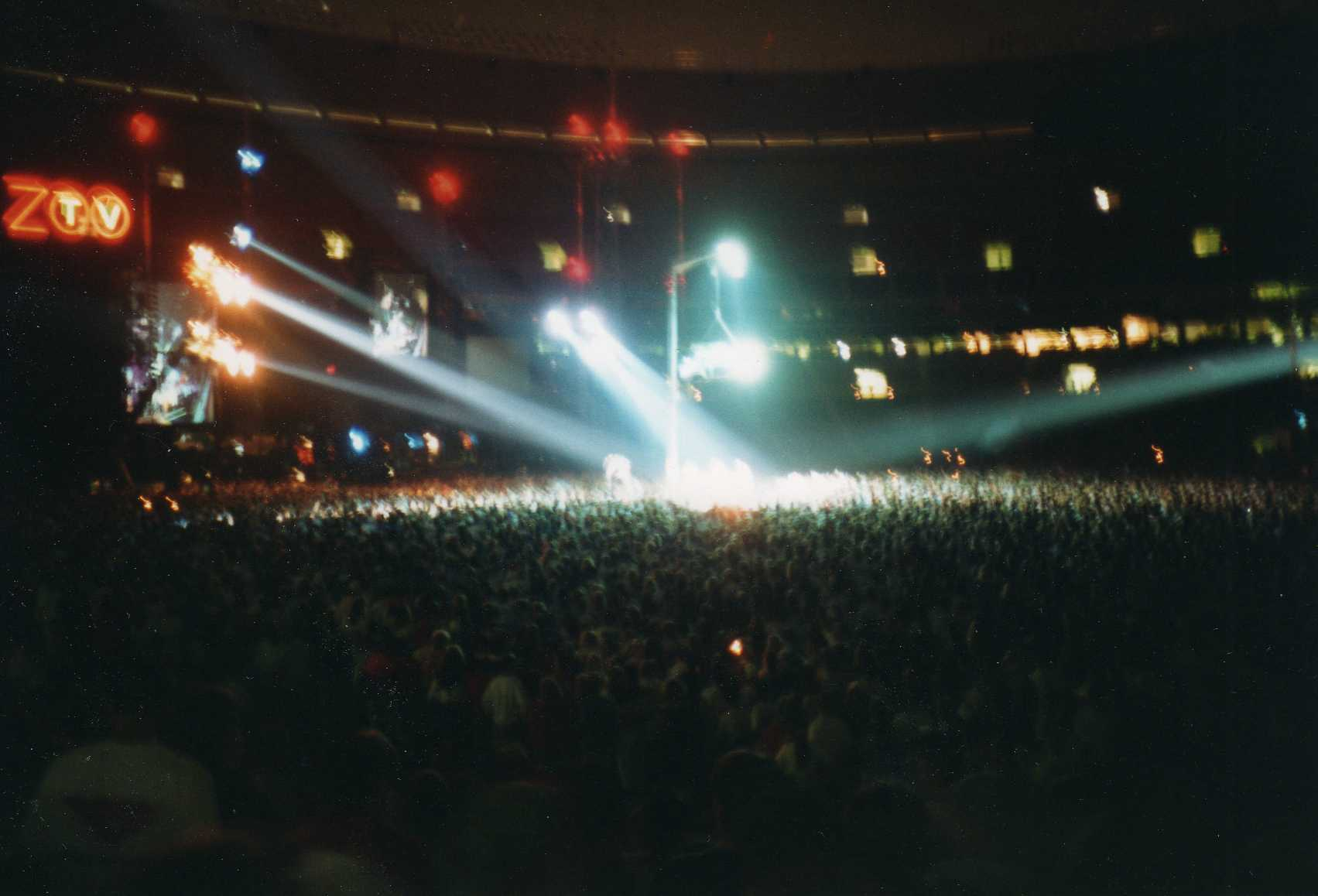
The B-stage on U2's Zoo TV Tour (1992–1993) is considered one of the first mainstream examples of the stage setup.

Although its origins trace back somewhat further, the B-stage was popularized by U2 on their Zoo TV Tour (1992–1993); the setup provided a more intimate setting for stripped-down, quieter versions of songs, that could be played in greater proximity to the floor section of the audience.

== Notable examples ==
=== Britney Spears ===
Britney Spears used a B-stage on her 2001–02 Dream Within a Dream Tour. The B-Stage was connected to the main stage by a runway, giving the stage the appearance of a giant key. Spears would also use a mini barge suspended in the air to get to the B-stage.

For 2009's The Circus Starring Britney Spears, in support of her album Circus (2008), the show had a "carnival" or "circus" theme, as it featured two smaller, round B-Stages on either side of the main round stage (located in the center of the venue), giving the whole performance the appearance of a three-ring "circus".

Spears also used a B-Stage for the North American leg of 2011's Femme Fatale Tour. The B-Stage contained a larger, circular, rotating platform that could be elevated. The runway-catwalk connecting the B-Stage to the main stage utilized conveyor belts, allowing Spears and her dancers to perform for more fans at a time, and move faster.

=== Madonna ===
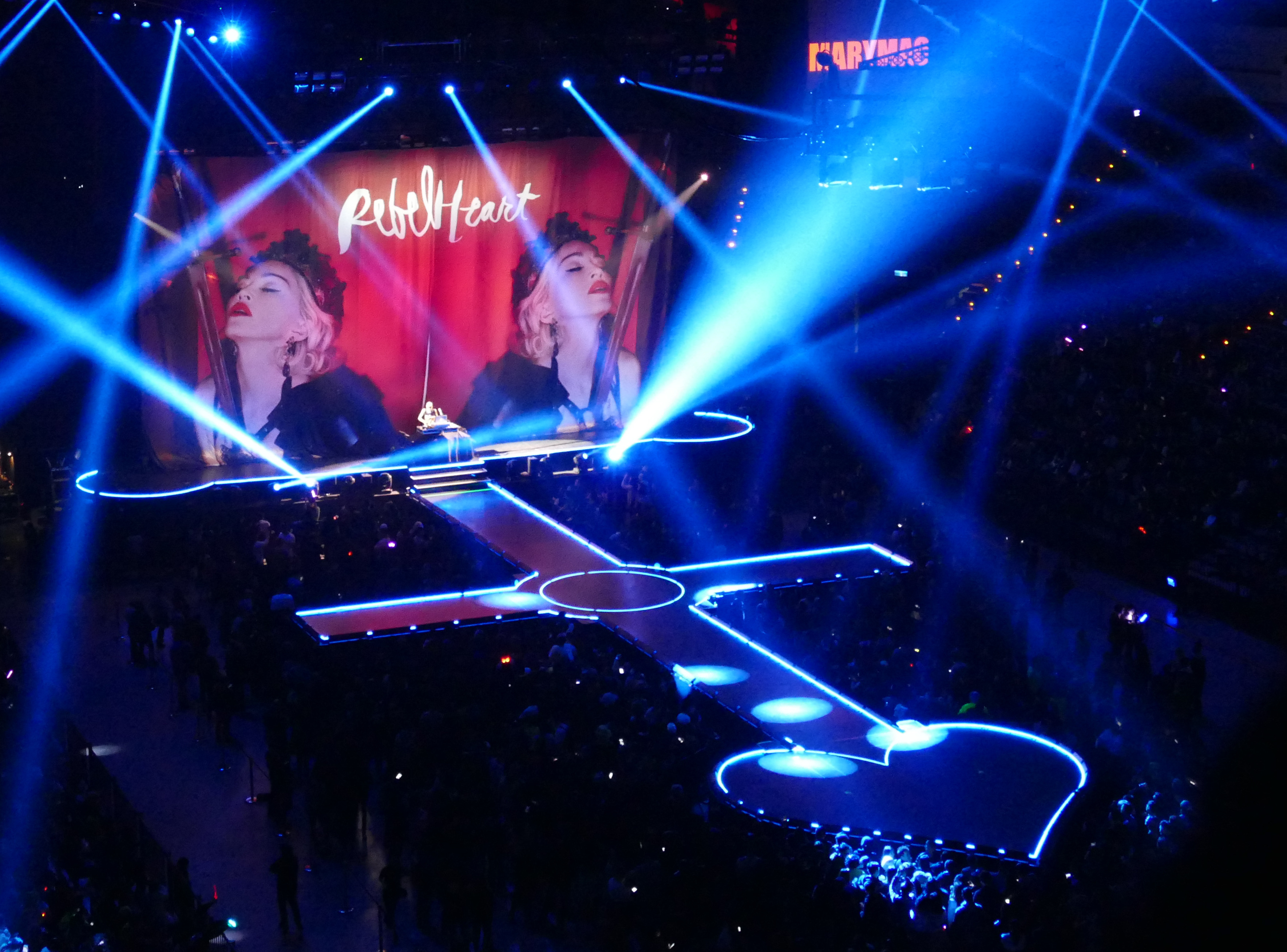
The stage for Madonna's Rebel Heart Tour had a long cross-shaped runway and ended in a heart-shaped B-stage.

Madonna has used a B-stage in six of her twelve tours starting with the Girlie Show, Confessions, Sticky & Sweet, MDNA, Rebel Heart and Celebration tours, connected by a catwalk. In the MDNA Tour, she employed a V-shaped catwalk to connect the main stage with the B stage, while Celebration used a network of B-stages and runways inspired by the streets and blocks of Manhattan.

=== Aerosmith and Bon Jovi ===
Aerosmith has employed a B-stage on almost every tour since 2001 (sometimes connected by a catwalk). During their outdoor amphitheater performances from 2001 to 2003, Aerosmith would play three songs on this stage during the middle of the show, and in more recent years, the band members go back and forth between the main stage and the B-stage throughout their performances via a catwalk. Bon Jovi made use of such a stage during their 2008 Lost Highway Tour in which Jon Bon Jovi (and sometimes Richie Sambora) would sing ballads such as "Bed of Roses", "Always", or "Living in Sin" from a smaller stage closer to the crowd, while the rest of the band performed on the main stage.

=== Backstreet Boys ===
Backstreet Boys employed a B-stage on their Black & Blue Tour in 2001, playing several ballads from the small circular stage in the middle of the audience. The band appeared on the B-stage via a platform in the center that raised the band from beneath the stage after a blackout and segue video which concealed their travel to the B-stage. They returned to the main stage during the final B-stage song on a bridge over the audience that descended from the rafters, and was raised again after the song.

=== Coldplay ===
Coldplay have been using a B-Stage since their 2008/2009 Viva la Vida Tour. The band makes use of a B-stage and a C-Stage at different points in each show. The B-stage, located at the end of a catwalk, attached to the main stage, was used in the middle of the set to perform a remix of "God Put a Smile Upon Your Face" and "Talk", as well as a piano version of "The Hardest Part". The C-stage was used at the end of the main setlist to perform three songs acoustically, and was located at the back of venue, in the audience. On the following tours, the Mylo Xyloto Tour and the A Head Full of Dreams Tour, B and C-Stages remain in use, with the B-stage located at the end of the catwalk with a giant screen on the floor.

=== Beyoncé ===
Beyoncé has used a B-Stage on every tour since I Am... (2009); in the middle of that show, she appeared from underneath the B-stage, attached to a ceiling harness, and was taken up and over the audience as she performed "Baby Boy". She then ran through the audience back to the main stage while performing "Say My Name". During The Mrs. Carter Show World Tour (2013–14), her "BeyStage" included two VIP pit sections with a catwalk in the middle. She also used a B-stage during her On the Run Tour (2014) with husband Jay-Z, and her Formation World Tour (2016).

When Beyoncé headlined Coachella 2018, the iconic festival in Indio, California, the traditional stage design was altered to feature a more extensive, "L"-shaped B-stage to bring the singer closer to more fans within the crowd; the "short" half of the "L" was perpendicular to the main stage, serving as a connection and a mini-stage in and of itself. The "long" portion of the "L" ran parallel to the main stage, with audience members in-between. The intro of Beyoncés set at the festival began at the very end of the B-stage, in the middle of the crowd, before she and her dancers made their way to the main stage.

=== Kiss ===
Hard rock band Kiss used a B-stage when they performed songs like "I Was Made for Lovin' You" or "Love Gun", both songs with lead vocals from Paul Stanley. Stanley would “fly” to a B-stage located in the middle of the crowd.

After having performed his "blood spitting" routine during their concerts, Gene Simmons would “fly” to another B-stage located above the stage before performing one of his "theme songs" like "God of Thunder", "Unholy" “War Machine”, or "I Love It Loud".

Examples of this can be seen on the Rock the Nation Live! DVD.

=== Taylor Swift ===
Taylor Swift had used B-stage on every tour since her debut Fearless Tour, where it was positioned on the far end of the arena; this configuration was also used for her subsequent Speak Now World Tour and The Red Tour. For The 1989 World Tour, the B-stage was connected to the main stage through a large catwalk, which would run through the entire floor (for the arena shows) or until the middle of the floor (for the stadium shows). On her Reputation Stadium Tour, two B-stages were positioned at the left and right far end of the stadiums, and she would use a flying basket to get to one of the B-stages, running through the crowd to go the other one. She used B-stages to perform stripped-down versions of her songs, as well as covers and surprise songs. For her most recent concert tour, The Eras Tour, she decided not to use a B-stage, and instead would perform the entire show, including surprise songs, on the main stage.

=== Lady Gaga ===
Lady Gaga frequently uses B-stages on her tours, incorporating them in the Monster Ball Tour where it was located just a few metres away from the main stage, Artrave: The Artpop Ball Tour in which 2 separate B-stages and 3 smaller satellite stages were incorporated into the arena layout for performances of "Gypsy", "Born This Way", "Dope", "You and I" and "Do What U Want", connected by transparent catwalks flanked with LED lighting on either side, and the Joanne World Tour, where a B-stage was located at the end of the arena and was used for performances of "Come To Mama", "The Edge of Glory" and "Born This Way".

=== Girls Aloud ===
Girls Aloud have used B-Stages on three of their concert tours. On 2008's Tangled Up Tour, a movable catwalk connecting the main stage and B-stage would be lowered and suspended above the crowd during the middle of the show. The group would perform a ballad while walking the catwalk out to the B-Stage. After performing another song on the B-Stage they would sing another song while walking back to the main stage.

On their 2009 Out of Control Tour, the B-Stage was once again located in the middle of the arena. The group would perform on a moving platform that flew over the crowd. After performing three songs on the B-Stage, the group would once again get back on the moving platform and sing another song while traveling back to the main stage.

For 2013's Ten: The Hits Tour, the B-Stage was again in the center of the arena. The group would perform a song while flying out to the B-stage on a giant sign reading the band's name. Once at the B-stage they would perform three songs before returning to the main stage.

=== Other examples ===
Mariah Carey used a central, square B-Stage during her The Adventures of Mimi Tour (2006).

Powderfinger used a B-stage on their 2010 Sunsets Farewell Tour, located at the back of the venue to reach more fans. Midway through the show, the band would leave the main stage and make their way to the B-stage while historical video footage played out on the main video screen. The clip ended with a boxer "punching" the camera, alluding to the video of the song "Like a Dog", which they would then perform on the B-stage. The band would perform another song, then return to the main stage.

The Spice Girls first utilized a B-stage for their televised concert special Girl Power! Live in Istanbul, a two-night event in Istanbul, Turkey, in 1997. In addition to raised, illuminated platforms on both sides of the main stage—which allowed the group to get closer to fans seated on the sides of the venue—, there was a center B-stage within the floor section of the arena, connected by a short runway to the main stage. Several songs were performed (or ended) on the B-stage, including the more intimate, poignant "Mama", in which the group sat on large pillows, surrounded by candles, while they sang to the audience.

German Neue Deutsche Härte Band Rammstein used a B-stage during their 2011–2013 Made In Germany tour which was connected to main stage by a lowerable bridge connected to the venue ceilings.

The Rolling Stones have included B-stages in basically every tour since the late 1970s. On their A Bigger Bang Tour from 2005 to 2007 they had a walkway that leads to the middle of stadiums and arena's that connect to a B-stage that they use to walk along during duration of the show. And they still use and include B-stages in their tours, including the Hackney Diamonds Tour in 2024. They are one of the first bands that first included B-stages.

Tyler, the Creator on his 2025 Chromakopia: The World Tour included a B-stage modeled after a living room. He would chronologically play tracks off of each of his albums on a vinyl record player on the center of the stage.

My Chemical Romance used a B-stage during their 2025-26 Long Live The Black Parade tour. The first section of the show- a full playthrough of The Black Parade- would be performed on the A-stage, followed by a second, more varied set on the B-stage.
