= Hold On to 18 =

- Cover of the 2008 digital re-release

Single by Black 'n Blue

from the album Black 'n Blue
- B-side: "Chains Around Heaven"
- Released: August 1984
- Recorded: 1984
- Genre: Glam metal
- Length: 4:12
- Label: Geffen
- Songwriter(s): Jaime St. James; Tommy Thayer
- Producer(s): Dieter Dierks

Black 'n Blue singles chronology
"School of Hard Knocks" (1984)	"Hold On to 18" (1984)	"Miss Mystery" (1985)

Music video
- "Hold On to 18" on YouTube

"Hold On to 18" is a song by American glam metal band Black 'n Blue from their eponymous debut album, Black 'n Blue. After being released as a promo in Japan, the song was released as the band's second single. The song was written by Jaime St. James and Tommy Thayer, and was the band's only single to chart, reaching number 50 on the Billboard Top Rock Tracks chart.

An earlier version of the song on the B-side of the single "Chains Around Heaven" was featured on the second and third pressings of the compilation album Metal Massacre (1982) alongside bands such as Metallica and Cirith Ungol.

== Chart performance ==
Chart (1984)	Peak position
US Top Rock Tracks (Billboard)	50
