= Hell Yeah =

Hell Yeah or Hell Yeah! may refer to:

== Music ==
- Hellyeah, a heavy metal band

=== Albums ===
- Hell Yeah! (Black 'n Blue album), 2011
- Hell Yeah! (HorrorPops album), 2004
- Hell Yeah (KMFDM album), 2017
- Hell Yeah! The Awesome Foursome, a 2008 live album by Gamma Ray
- Hellyeah (album), by Hellyeah, 2007
- Hell Yeah!, an album by Rene SG

=== Songs ===
- "Hell Yeah" (Montgomery Gentry song), 2003
- "Hell Yeah" (Rev Theory song), 2008
- "Hell Yeah" (Ginuwine song), 2002
- "Hell Yeah", a 2005 song by Neil Diamond from the album 12 Songs
- "Hell Yeah!", a 2005 song by American Hi-Fi from the album Hearts on Parade
- "Hell Yeah", a 2011 song by Ab-Soul from the album Longterm Mentality
- "Hell Yeah", a 2012 song by Midnight Red
- "Hell Yeah", a 2012 song by Nicki Minaj from the album Pink Friday: Roman Reloaded – The Re-Up
- "Hell, Yeah", song by Nothing But Thieves from the album Broken Machine
- "Hell Yeah (Pimp the System)" or "Hell Yeah" (Rock Remix), tracks on RBG: Revolutionary but Gangsta by Dead Prez
- "Hell Yeah", a 2022 song by SoFaygo and Ken Carson from the album Pink Heartz
- "Hell Yeah," a 1999 song by The Bloodhound Gang from the album Hooray for Boobies

== Other ==
- "Hell Yeah! Wrath of the Dead Rabbit", a video game
