= Adam Bomb (musician) =

American guitarist and singer

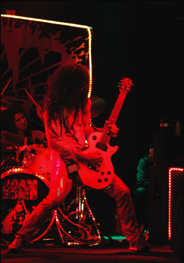

Background information
- Born: Adam Brenner; 14 August 1963 (age 63)
- Origin: Seattle, Washington, U.S.
- Genres: Glam rock, hard rock
- Occupation: Musician
- Instruments: Guitar, vocals
- Label: Geffen

Adam Bomb (born Adam Brenner, 14 August 1963) is an American guitarist who worked with artists like TKO, Black 'N Blue, Steel Pulse, John Paul Jones, and Michael Monroe.

== Early ==
In 1979, Adam Bomb and future Queensrÿche frontman Geoff Tate started a cover band called Tyrant. Later, Bomb joined the band TKO, with who he recorded the album In Your Face. In 1982, Bomb flew to LA and unsuccessfully auditioned for Kiss. He then moved to Hollywood and shared an apartment with Jeffrey Isbell (better known as Izzy Stradlin). He met neighbor, Tommy Thayer, a guitarist for the band Movie Star (which later evolved into Black N' Blue), who came up with the original idea that he should call his act 'Adam Bomb'. Movie Star opened for TKO at The Showbox in 1983. Adam recorded his first demos with producer Rick Keefer while playing gigs with Steeler as a replacement. One year later, Bomb recorded songs with drummer Chuck Ruff and bassist Cliff Williams of AC/DC, and finally finished his album Fatal Attraction.

== The Adam Bomb Band ==
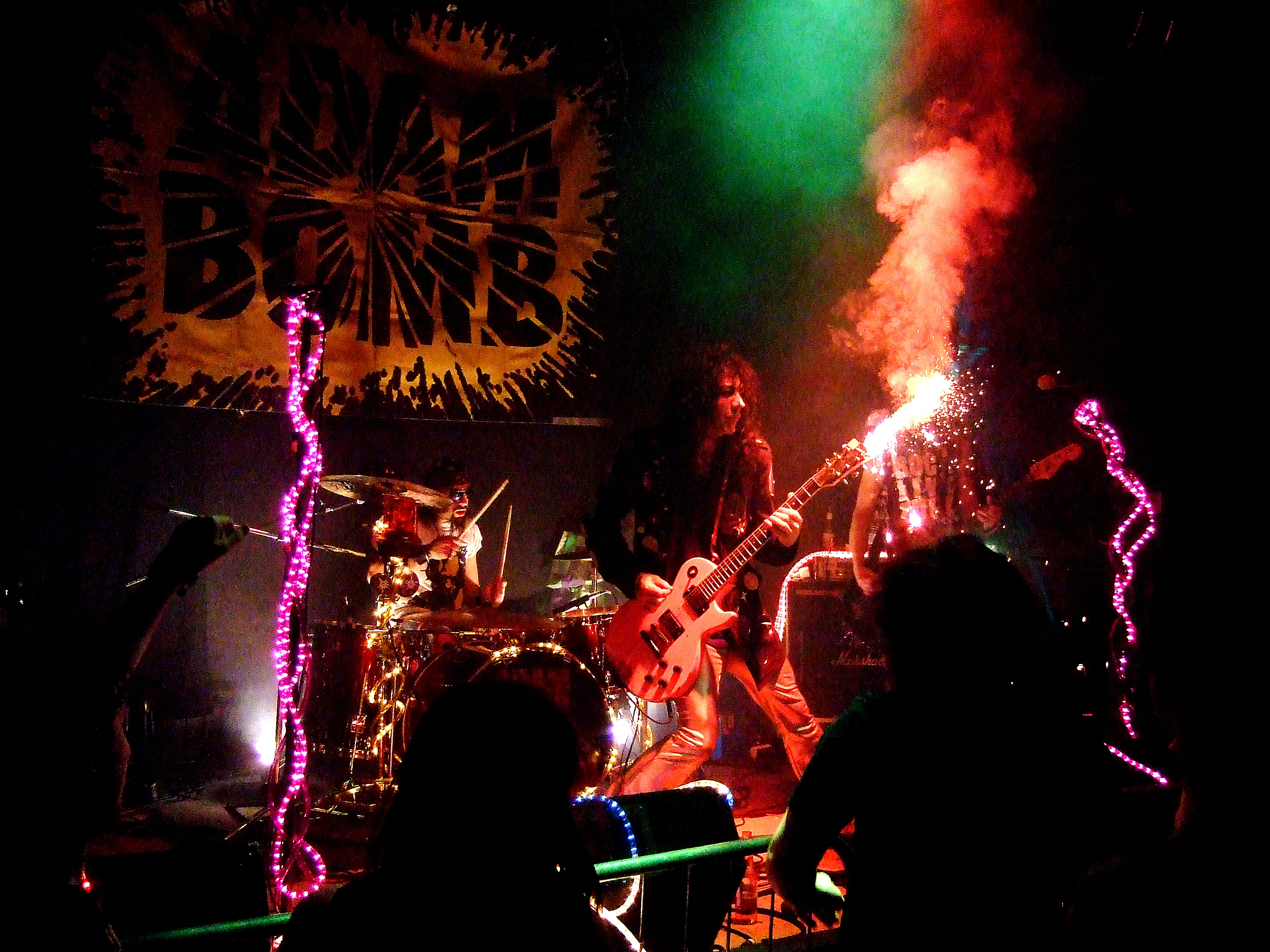
Adam Bomb Band at Dundee Doghouse 2007

Bomb signed a management deal with Leber Krebs, and moved to NYC to start the Adam Bomb Band with former Billy Idol drummer Gregg Gerson, Billy Idol/Riot bassist Phil Feit, and Aerosmith guitarist Jimmy Crespo. They recorded Fatal Attraction in 1985. The band later moved again to Los Angeles, and for a time, opened for bands Armored Saint and Metallica.

The follow-up contained mainly left over material from their debut release, and so Pure S.E.X. (1989) had indifferent reviews.

== 2011 ==
In 2011, Adam Bomb bassist Paul Del Bello and drummer Violet Cannibal had started recording on a CDs Rock On, Rock Hard, Rock Animal. The album had cover songs as well as original material. Bomb recorded "Affection" (written by Little Steven), continued touring, and lived around Europe occasionally. In July 2016, he recorded a single with drummer Bobby Reynolds, keyboardist Alan St Jon, saxophonist Arno Hecht, and Phil Feit.

== Current ==
- Adam Bomb – vocals, guitar
- Paul Del Bello - bass
- Kid Leo - drums
- Maxx Rock - bass*

=== Past ===
- Jimmy Crespo – guitar (1984–1985) (Aerosmith, Billy Squier, Rod Stewart)
- Stevie Klasson – guitar (1988–1989) (Johnny Thunders)
- Kurtis Schefter – guitar (1988) (Allanah Myles)
- Alan St. John – keyboards (1996–1998) (Alice Cooper, Billy Squier)
- Phil Feit - bass (1984-1987, 1990-1992, 1995) (Riot, Billy Idol, Joan Jett)
- Kenny Aaronson – bass (1996–1998) (Dust, Rick Derringer, Billy Idol, Joan Jett)
- Bobby Chouinard – drums (1987–1997) (Billy Squier, Alice Cooper, Gary Moore)
- Sandy Slavin – drums (1985–1991) (Riot, Ace Frehley)
- Gregg Gerson – drums (1984–1985, 1986–1987) (Billy Idol, Mayday, Sven Gali)
- Jeff Consi – drums (1999–2000) (Nuno Bettencourt)
- Dennis Marcotte aka KK McKay – bass (1999–2002)
- Thommy Price – drums (Atomic Playboys, Billy Idol, Joan Jett)
- Kiki Tornado – drums (2003–2004) (Sex Museum) and 2006 tour
- Bobby Reynolds – drums, (2003, 2006.2007 2009 2012, 2013)
- Paul Del Bello – bass guitar, vitals (2006–2012, 2014, 2024 -present
- Violet Cannibal – drums, (2010–2012, 2016, 2018)
- Ralphy Lee Fox (Rafał Pietrzykowski) - drums (2019)
- Konrad Kozerawski (Kozzy) – bass, ( 2019-2020 2022-2025)

== Discography ==
=== Solo ===
==== Live ====
- 2024 – Livedream

==== Studio ====
- 1985 – Fatal Attraction
- 1989 – Pure SEX.
- 1993 – Grave New World
- 1999 – Get Animal
- 2000 – Get Animal 2
- 2001 – New York Times
- 2003 – Third World Roar
- 2004 – Acoustica
- 2005 – Rock Like Fuck
- 2009 – Crazy Motherfucker
- 2012 – Rock On, Rock Hard, Rock Animal

==== Comps ====
- 2004 – Bone Yard

=== With TKO ===
- 1981 – In Your Face

=== With Black 'N Blue ===
- 1985 – Without Love

=== With Steel Pulse ===
- 1988 – State of Emergency

=== With John Paul Jones ===
- 2001 – The Thunderthief

=== With Michael Monroe ===
- 2002 – Take Them and Break Them
- 2003 – Whatcha Want
- 2008 – Pirates of the Baltic Sea
