= Kiss Symphony: The DVD =

Video by Kiss
- Released: September 9, 2003
- Recorded: Melbourne, Australia, February 28, 2003
- Genre: Hard rock, heavy metal
- Label: Sanctuary

Kiss chronology
The Second Coming (2000)	Kiss Symphony: The DVD (2003)	Rock the Nation Live! (2005)

German Edition cover

Kiss Symphony: The DVD is a DVD by the American hard rock band Kiss. The DVD features footage from the Australian tour, and the audio had been released for the live album Kiss Symphony: Alive IV.

== Track listing ==
All tracks were recorded at Marvel Stadium (formerly known as Telstra Dome) in Melbourne, Australia, on February 28, 2003.

=== 2-Disc Edition ===
==== Disc 1 ====
The Kiss Symphony Story
No.	Title	Length
1.	"Overture"
2.	"The Calm Before the Storm"
3.	"Kiss Lands in Melbourne"
4.	"Rehearsals I - Kiss Meets the MSO"
5.	"Australia’s Largest Stadium Set-up"
6.	"Rehearsals II - Getting in the Groove"
7.	"National TV Interview"
8.	"Kiss Fans Get Ready"
9.	"Production Rehearsal"
10.	"The MSO Gets Into Makeup"

Act Three: Kiss With the Melbourne Symphony Orchestra
No.	Title	Writer(s)	Length
1.	"Detroit Rock City"	Stanley, Ezrin
2.	"King of the Night Time World"	Stanley, Ezrin, Kim Fowley, Mark Anthony
3.	"Do You Love Me"	Stanley, Ezrin, Fowley
4.	"Shout It Out Loud"	Stanley, Simmons, Ezrin
5.	"God of Thunder"	Stanley
6.	"Love Gun"	Stanley
7.	"Black Diamond"	Stanley
8.	"Great Expectations" (featuring the Australian Children's Choir)	Simmons, Ezrin
9.	"I Was Made for Lovin' You"	Stanley, Desmond Child, Poncia
10.	"Rock and Roll All Nite"	Stanley, Simmons

==== Disc 2 ====
Act One: Kiss
No.	Title	Writer(s)	Length
1.	"Deuce"	Gene Simmons
2.	"Strutter"	Paul Stanley, Simmons
3.	"Let Me Go, Rock 'n' Roll"	Stanley, Simmons
4.	"Lick It Up"	Vinnie Vincent, Stanley
5.	"Calling Dr. Love"	Simmons
6.	"Psycho Circus"	Stanley, Simmons

Act Two: Kiss With The Melbourne Symphony Ensembl
No.	Title	Writer(s)	Length
1.	"Beth"	Peter Criss, Stan Penridge, Bob Ezrin
2.	"Forever"	Stanley, Michael Bolton
3.	"Goin' Blind"	Simmons, Stephen Coronel
4.	"Sure Know Something"	Stanley, Vini Poncia
5.	"Shandi"	Stanley, Poncia

Act Three: Kiss With The Melbourne Symphony Orchestra
No.	Title	Writer(s)	Length
1.	"Detroit Rock City"	Stanley, Ezrin
2.	"King of the Night Time World"	Stanley, Ezrin, Kim Fowley, Mark Anthony
3.	"Do You Love Me"	Stanley, Ezrin, Fowley
4.	"Shout It Out Loud"	Stanley, Simmons, Ezrin
5.	"God of Thunder"	Stanley
6.	"Love Gun"	Stanley
7.	"Black Diamond"	Stanley
8.	"Great Expectations" (featuring the Australian Children's Choir)	Simmons, Ezrin
9.	"I Was Made for Lovin' You"	Stanley, Desmond Child, Poncia
10.	"Rock and Roll All Nite"	Stanley, Simmons

Bonus Features
No.	Title	Length
1.	"Kiss Interview and Performance of "Sure Know Something" With the Melbourne Symphony Ensemble on the Australian TV Show Rove Live!"

== Certifications ==
Certifications and sales for Kiss Symphony: The DVD
Region	Certification	Certified units/sales
Argentina (CAPIF)	Platinum	8,000^{^}
Australia (ARIA)	Platinum	15,000^{^}
Canada (Music Canada)	2× Platinum	20,000^{^}
United States (RIAA)	2× Platinum	100,000^{^}
^{^} Shipments figures based on certification alone.
