= Black 'n Blue (album) =

Black 'N Blue

Studio album by Black 'n Blue
- Released: August 1984
- Studios: Dierks Studios, Stommeln, West Germany
- Genres: Glam metal, heavy metal
- Length: 40:07
- Label: Geffen
- Producer: Dieter Dierks

Black 'n Blue chronology
Black 'N Blue (1984)	Without Love (1985)

Singles from Black 'n Blue
- 1. "Hold On to 18" / "Chains Around Heaven" Released: 1984; 2. "School of Hard Knocks" / "Action" Released: 1984

Professional ratings
Review scores
Source	Rating
AllMusic	3/5 stars
Collector's Guide to Heavy Metal	8/10
Rolling Stone	(favorable)
Rock Hard	7.0/10

Black 'N Blue is the debut studio album by American glam metal band Black 'n Blue, released in 1984. The album includes the band's only song to chart as a single, Hold On to 18. In 2015, the album was ranked 28th at Rolling Stone's "50 Greatest Hair Metal Albums of All Time".

The track "Chains Around Heaven" had previously appeared on both the second and third pressings of the compilation album Metal Massacre (1982).

== Track listing ==
Side one

1. "The Strong Will Rock" (Jaime St. James, Tommy Thayer) – 4:06
2. "School of Hard Knocks" (St. James, Thayer) – 3:58
3. "Autoblast" (St. James, Thayer, Jeff Warner) – 3:53
4. "Hold On to 18" (St. James, Thayer) – 4:12
5. "Wicked Bitch" (St. James) – 4:17

Side two

6. "Action" (Brian Connolly, Steve Priest, Andy Scott, Mick Tucker) – 3:36 (Sweet cover)
7. "Show Me the Night" (St. James, Thayer) – 4:01
8. "One for the Money" (St. James, Thayer) – 4:19
9. "I'm the King" (St. James, Thayer, Patrick Young, Pete Holmes) – 3:42
10. "Chains Around Heaven" (St. James, Thayer) – 4:00

== Personnel ==
Black 'n Blue

- Jaime St. James – lead and backing vocals
- Tommy Thayer – lead guitar, backing vocals
- Jeff "Woop" Warner – rhythm guitar, backing vocals
- Patrick Young – bass, backing vocals
- Pete Holmes – drums

Production

- Dieter Dierks – producer, mixing
- Gerd Rautenbach – engineer
- Greg Fulginiti – mastering at Artisan Sound Recorders

== Charts ==
Chart (1984)	Peak position
US Billboard 200	129
