= Hell Yeah! (Black 'n Blue album) =

Studio album by Black 'n Blue
- Released: 20 April 2011 (Japan); 13 May 2011 (Europe); 17 May 2011 (USA)
- Genre: Glam metal
- Length: 47:47
- Label: Frontiers
- Producer: Jeff "Woop" Warner

Black 'n Blue chronology
Rarities (2007)	Hell Yeah! (2011)

Professional ratings
Review scores
Source	Rating
About	4/5 stars
Allmusic	3.5/5 stars

Hell Yeah! is the fifth studio album by the American glam metal band Black 'n Blue, released in 2011.

Although the band had reunited sporadically since their initial break-up at the end of the 1980s, "Hell Yeah!" is their first album release of entirely new material since In Heat in 1988. It is also their first album with guitarist Shawn Sonnenschein. The band had begun recording this album in 2003, following their decision to reform on a permanent basis. However, the band had a difficult time trying to find a record company to produce and master the album. In the time period of 2003-2011, Jaime St. James sang for Warrant, and the band played a few reunion shows. Eventually, Black 'n Blue were able to land a contract deal with Frontiers Records in 2011. After years of struggle, the album was finally released on three release dates. The album had an early release date in Japan on April 20, 2011. The album had a European release date of May 13, 2011. The album also had a North American release date of May 17, 2011.

The album mostly had positive reviews. Hardrock Haven gave the album a 9.5/10, saying, "When you hear something this good, you don’t want to have to wonder about 'what could have been' ever again." Amazon.com gave the album 4.5/5, calling the album "a record that goes back to the roots of the 'classic' Black 'N Blue sound, mixing tight and hard rocking songs with a sleazy attitude."

== Track listing ==
All songs written by Jaime St. James

1. "Monkey" - 3:53
2. "Target" - 4:12
3. "Hail Hail" - 5:22
4. "Fools Bleed" - 4:53
5. "C'mon" - 2:33
6. "Jaime's Got the Beer" - 0:54
7. "Angry Drunk Son of a Bitch" - 3:20
8. "So Long" - 3:52
9. "Trippin'" - 0:46
10. "Falling Down" - 4:33
11. "Candy" - 4:14
12. "Hell Yeah!" - 3:50
13. "World Goes Round" - 3:24
14. "I Smell a Rat (Japan Bonus Track)" - 4:24
15. "A Tribute to Hawking (Hidden Track)" - 1:19

== Personnel ==
- Jaime St. James - vocals
- Shawn Sonnenschein - lead guitar
- Jeff "Woop" Warner - rhythm guitar
- Patrick Young - bass
- Pete Holmes - drums

== Production ==
- Produced and mixed by Jeff "Woop" Warner:
