= In Heat (Black 'N Blue album) =

Studio album by Black 'n Blue
- Released: 1988
- Studios: Rumbo Recorders and Club Vital, Los Angeles, California, Right Track Recording and Electric Lady Studios, New York City
- Genre: Glam metal
- Length: 41:08
- Label: Geffen
- Producers: Gene Simmons, Pat Regan

Black 'n Blue chronology
Nasty Nasty (1986)	In Heat (1988)	One Night Only: Live (1998)

Singles from In Heat
- 1. "Live It Up" Released: 1988

Professional ratings
Review scores
Source	Rating
AllMusic	2/5 stars
Collector's Guide to Heavy Metal	4/10
Rock Hard	6.0/10

In Heat is the fourth studio album by the American glam metal band Black 'n Blue. It was produced by Kiss bassist Gene Simmons.

== Contemporary reviews ==
In contemporary review for the June 1988 issue of Circus, music critic Paul Gallotta welcomed the release as a "pleasant surprise," giving substantial credit to Gene Simmons of Kiss for his role as producer. Gallotta described the work as Simmons' "finest production job to date," noting that his guidance brought out impressively tight vocal harmonies and emphasized a "terminally catchy" arena rock sound. Furthermore, the review highlighted several standout tracks on the record. Gallotta specifically commended "Heat It Up, Burn It Out" for its stylistic similarity to the classic material of Kiss, while also singling out "Suspicious" and "Great Guns of Fire" as the strongest compositions on the tracklist.

== Track listing ==
Side one

1. "Rock On" (Gene Simmons, Jaime St. James, Tommy Thayer) – 3:45
2. "Sight for Sore Eyes" (Simmons, St. James, Thayer, Pat Regan) – 3:31
3. "Heat It Up! Burn It Out!" (St. James, Thayer, Jeff Warner) – 4:21
4. "Suspicious" (St. James, Thayer, Regan) – 3:42
5. "The Snake" (St. James, Thayer) – 4:41

Side two

6. "Live It Up" (Simmons, St. James, Warner) – 3:37
7. "Gimme Your Love" (Adam Mitchell, St. James, Thayer) – 3:45
8. "Get Wise to the Rise" (St. James, Thayer) – 4:36
9. "Great Guns of Fire" (St. James, Thayer) – 4:37
10. "Stranger" (Simmons, St. James) – 4:33

== Personnel ==
Black 'n Blue

- Jaime St. James – vocals
- Tommy Thayer – lead guitar
- Jeff Warner – rhythm guitar
- Patrick Young – bass
- Pete Holmes – drums

Additional musicians

- John Purdell, Pat Regan – keyboards

Production

- Gene Simmons – producer
- Pat Regan – associate producer on tracks 2 and 4
- Dave Wittman – engineer, mixing
- Adam Yellin, Andrew Udoff, Danny Mormando, David Reitzas, Jon Magnusson, Scott Mabuchi – assistant engineers
- George Marino – mastering at Sterling Sound, New York
- Hugh Syme – art direction and design
- John Kalodner – A&R

== Charts ==
Chart (1988)	Peak position
US Billboard 200	133
