= Nasty Nasty =

Studio album by Black 'n Blue
- Released: August 1986
- Studios: Baby'O Recorders, Cherokee Studios and One on One Recording Studios, Los Angeles, California
- Genre: Glam metal
- Length: 38:25
- Label: Geffen
- Producers: Gene Simmons, Jonathan Cain (track 7)

Black 'n Blue chronology
Without Love (1985)	Nasty Nasty (1986)	In Heat (1988)

Singles from Nasty Nasty
- 1. "I Want It All (I Want It Now)" Released: 1986; 2. "I'll Be There For You" Released: 1986

Professional ratings
Review scores
Source	Rating
AllMusic	3/5 stars
Collector's Guide to Heavy Metal	5/10

Nasty Nasty is the third studio album by the American glam metal band Black 'n Blue. It was produced by Kiss bassist Gene Simmons, with the exception of the song "I'll Be There for You" which was written and produced by The Babys/Bad English/Journey rhythm guitarist/keyboardist Jonathan Cain.

== Background ==
The title track is the basis of the Kiss song "Domino", and also contains the ending riff from "Only You", both Kiss songs credited to Simmons. Black 'n Blue guitarist Tommy Thayer would later join Kiss in 2002.

Nasty Nasty saw the band move away from the more polished approach of Without Love as it did not appeal to their metal fans. As a result, the production is much more raw and the album has a much more aggressive feel than Without Love, as the band sticks with hard rockers with the exception of "I'll Be There for You."

=== I'll Be There for You ===
The band had originally intended a song titled, "Promise the Moon" to be on the album, but it was replaced by "I'll Be There for You" because the record company thought that nothing could be pulled as a single. However, keyboard credits were given in the cassette and on the back of the LP to John Purdell for "Promise the Moon" and "Kiss of Death." Fans were baffled by this until liner notes in the 2003 re-master explained it.

=== Kiss of Death ===
At the end of "Kiss of Death", a different melody begins, the music is played forward, but Jaime's voice is heard singing backwards as a result to the backmasking controversy. When played reverse, it deciphers, "Baby, don't touch me anymore, don't touch me, you sick little bitch, I don't like this from you anymore, anymore, yeah, yeah, yeah, don't touch me, baby, get away from me, get away from me, you're just too sick for my--".

== Track listing ==
Side one

1. "Nasty Nasty" (Gene Simmons, Jaime St. James, Tommy Thayer) – 4:29
2. "I Want It All (I Want It Now)" (Simmons, St. James, Thayer) – 4:25
3. "Does She or Doesn't She" (St. James, Simmons, Thayer) – 4:18
4. "Kiss of Death" (St. James, Thayer, Jeff Warner, Patrick Young, Pete Holmes) – 5:04

Side two

5. "12 O'Clock High" (St. James, Thayer, Warner, Young, Holmes) – 3:41
6. "Do What You Wanna Do" (St. James, Thayer, Warner, Young, Holmes) – 4:14
7. "I'll Be There for You" (Jonathan Cain) – 3:47
8. "Rules" (St. James, Warner) – 3:40
9. "Best in the West" (St. James, Thayer, Warner, Young, Holmes) – 4:47

== Personnel ==
Black 'n Blue

- Jaime St. James – lead and backing vocals
- Tommy Thayer – lead guitar, backing vocals
- Jeff Warner – rhythm guitar
- Patrick Young – bass
- Pete Holmes – drums

Additional musicians

- John Purdell – keyboards on "Kiss of Death and I'll Be There for You"
- Peter Criss, Ron Keel – vocals on "Best in the West"
- Marc Ferrari – guitar on "Best in the West"

Production

- Gene Simmons – producer
- Jonathan Cain – producer on track 7
- Mickey Davis, Duane Baron – engineers
- Larry Hinds – engineer on track 7
- Val Garay – mixing at Record One and One on One Recording Studios, Hollywood, California
- Stephen Marcussen – mastering at Precision Lacquer, Hollywood, California
- John Kalodner – A&R

== Charts ==
Chart (1986)	Peak position
US Billboard 200	110
