= The Second Coming (video) =

Video by Kiss
- Released: November 24, 1998
- Recorded: Various dates on the Alive/Worldwide Tour
- Genre: Hard rock, heavy metal
- Length: 133 minutes
- Label: Sanctuary
- Director: Tommy Thayer
- Producer: Tommy Thayer

Kiss chronology
Psycho Circus 3-D Video (1998)	The Second Coming (1998)	Kiss Symphony: The DVD (2003)

The Second Coming is a documentary video collection released by the band Kiss in 1998. The video is focused on the reunion of the original Kiss lineup and subsequent Alive/Worldwide Tour, which took place in 1996 and 1997.

== Bonus features ==
Included as exclusive content on the DVD edition.

No.	Title	Writer(s)	Length
1.	"Shout It Out Loud" (live, 1996 – Tiger Stadium)	Bob Ezrin, Paul Stanley, Gene Simmons
2.	"Detroit Rock City" (live, Detroit Rock City movie premiere)	Stanley, Ezrin
3.	"Shandi" (live, 1997 – Sydney, Australia)	Stanley, Vini Poncia

== Reception ==
The Second Coming was certified Platinum in the US.

== Certifications ==
Region	Certification	Certified units/sales
Australia (ARIA)	2× Platinum	30,000^{^}
United States (RIAA)	Platinum	100,000^{^}
^{^} Shipments figures based on certification alone.
