= Axe Bass =

Bass guitar

The axe bass is a bass guitar which is visually designed in similarity to that of an axe. This design is (though rare) highly prized among bass players usually in hard rock and heavy metal music. Some electric guitars have also sported the axe design though they are moderately popular and sometimes discredited. Since its creation, the axe bass has been highly desired, very expensive, and a very rare prize among guitar shops and music stores.

The axe bass has also been associated with Marceline the Vampire Queen (character on the hit Cartoon Network television show Adventure Time), whose bass is very literally made out of a battle axe.

== Origin ==
Rock musician Gene Simmons is to be credited with the "axe" design. In 1978, Simmons was searching for a new bass guitar that would either "blend in" or "stand out from" his garish make up and costume, would be a good trademark, and would show his philosophy of how a bass should be handled - like a weapon. After garnering enough wealth from touring with his band Kiss, Simmons approached Valdez Guitars to build his first axe bass. Since then, the axe bass has been a running trademark for Kiss.
