= Without Love (Black 'n Blue album) =

Studio album by Black 'n Blue
- Released: 16 September 1985
- Studios: Little Mountain Sound Studios, Mushroom Studios and Ocean Sound Studio, Vancouver, Canada
- Genre: Glam metal
- Length: 39:31
- Label: Geffen
- Producer: Bruce Fairbairn

Black 'n Blue chronology
Black 'n Blue (1984)	Without Love (1985)	Nasty Nasty (1986)

Singles from Without Love
- 1. "Miss Mystery" / "Rockin' On Heaven's Door" Released: 1985; 2. "Without Love" Released: 1985 (promo); 3. "Swing Time" Released: 1985

Professional ratings
Review scores
Source	Rating
AllMusic	2.5/5 stars
Collector's Guide to Heavy Metal	8/10
Kerrang!	4.2/5
Rock Hard	4.0/10

Without Love is the second studio album by the American glam metal band Black 'n Blue. It was produced by Bruce Fairbairn. The album features a guest appearance by Loverboy's Mike Reno on the song, "We Got the Fire".

== Track listing ==
Side one

1. "Rockin' on Heaven's Door" (Jaime St. James, Tommy Thayer) – 3:30
2. "Without Love" (Jaime St. James, Jim Vallance) – 3:38
3. "Stop the Lightning" (St. James, Thayer) – 4:08
4. "Nature of the Beach" (St. James, Thayer) – 3:50
5. "Miss Mystery" (St. James, Thayer, Jim Vallance) – 4:00

Side two

6. "Swing Time" (St. James, Warner) – 3:21
7. "Bombastic Plastic" (St. James) – 3:38
8. "We Got the Fire" (St. James, Thayer, Warner) – 3:11
9. "Strange Things" (St. James, Thayer, Warner) – 3:24
10. "Two Wrongs (Don't Make It Love)" (St. James, Thayer) – 3:51

=== CD and cassette edition bonus track ===
11. "Same Old Song and Dance" (Joe Perry, Steven Tyler) – 4:14 (Aerosmith cover)

== Personnel ==
Black 'n Blue

- Jaime St. James – lead and backing vocals
- Tommy Thayer – lead guitar, backing vocals
- Jeff Warner – rhythm guitar
- Patrick Young – bass
- Pete Holmes – drums

Additional musicians

- Jim Vallance – electronic drums
- Adam Bomb – additional guitar
- Dave Pickell, Doug Johnson, Steve Porcaro – keyboards
- Mike Reno – backing vocals on "We Got the Fire"

Production

- Bruce Fairbairn – producer, mixing
- Bob Rock – engineer, mixing
- Mike Fraser, Rob Porter – additional engineers
- George Marino – mastering
