= Mending Kids International =

Non-profit organization

Mending Kids
- Founded: 2006
- Founder: Cris Embleton
- Type: NGO
- Registration no.: United States (95-4394305)
- Location: 2307 West Olive Avenue, Suite B, Burbank, California, US
- Region served: Worldwide
- Website: www.mendingkids.org

Mending Kids is a 501(c)(3) non-profit organization that provides surgeries to children across the world while training local medical communities to become self-sustaining. It brings surgical mission teams of doctors, nurses and volunteers who donate their time and services to travel to developing countries to perform procedures that range from pediatric open-heart, neuro, ENT, orthopedic or general surgeries on impoverished or orphaned children while establishing sustainable teaching programs. Since 2006, it has helped thousands of children in 54 countries around the world, including the United States. The organization currently operates in Burbank, California.

== History ==
Cris Embleton started volunteering nearly 30 years ago by helping local hospitals and communities. After the death of her adopted daughter just prior to her first birthday, she started her own non-profit organization, 'Healing the Children', which is now running in 14 states. In order to expand the mission in California, Embleton and her local Board of Directors broke off from the organization and started Mending Kids International in 2005.

== Programs ==
1) U.S. Surgeries –– The organization brings children with complex surgical needs to the United States for treatment in partnerships with hospitals, such as Children's Hospital Los Angeles, Cedars-Sinai Medical Center and UCLA Medical Center, and several other medical organizations across Southern California. During the surgeries, the organization places the children with approved host families who make certain the children's emotional needs and living arrangements are provided.

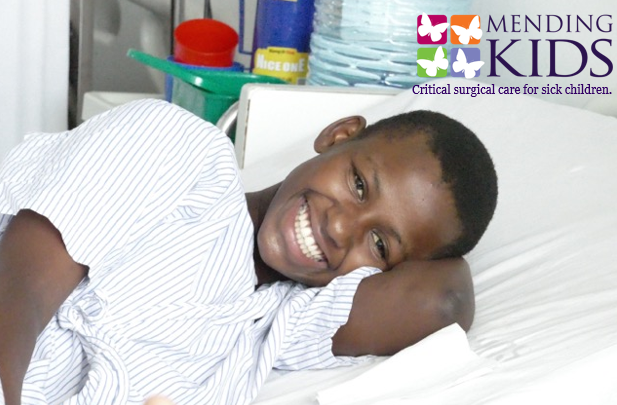
Mending Kids patient in Tanzania, photographed by volunteer Rebecca Pollack Parker

2) Surgical Missions –– Mending Kids assembles pediatric surgical mission teams along with non-medical volunteers and takes them to developing countries to provide free specialized surgeries to under-served, impoverished and/or orphaned children. Surgical missions provide help to children who would otherwise not have access to this care in their own country. The missions' priorities are to provide local surgeons and medical staff with mentoring and specialized surgical training in order to create self-sustainment. In 2014, Mending Kids is scheduled to travel on 11 missions including: Ethiopia, Panama, Guatemala (two trips), Mozambique, China, Peru, Costa Rica, Panama and Nicaragua.

3) International Surgeries –– Due to a variety of reasons, including funding, it may be near impossible to fly the child to Los Angeles or send a surgical mission team to serve one patient. To solve this type of cases, Mending Kids arranges to fund or provide surgeries to these children locally or in neighboring countries by partnering with local hospitals and other NGOs who may have access to surgeons but not the necessary funding.

4) Hometown Mission Mending Kids launched their first Hometown mission in July 2013. The program gives needed operations to children living in the United States treatment when they do not have access to the surgical care they need, or have been denied by providers. A volunteer surgical team from a local hospital perform operations on up to 20 children in one day over the summer.
