= Rene SG =

Dutch rock band

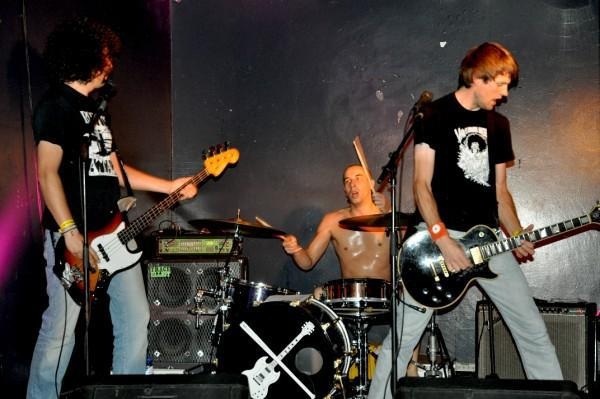
- Rene SG live in 2009

Background information
- Origin: Amsterdam, Netherlands
- Genres: Punk rock, hard rock, rock, rock and roll
- Years active: 2004 – 2018
- Labels: Monster Zero, Marista, Langweiligkeit, Sonic Rendezvous
- Members: Rene Kaptyn; RJ SG; Dennis Duijnhouwer
- Website: Official website

Rene SG was a Dutch band from Amsterdam. The band was founded by guitar player Rene Kaptyn in the beginning of 2004. He was joined by drummer RJ SG and Swedish bassplayer Kalle Mattsson in making the debut, simply titled Rene SG which was released early 2006 by Langweiligkeit Records as their first ever release. After this album Kalle left Rene SG. Bassplayer Niels stepped in to insure the continuance of the tight trinity that is Rene SG.

This line-up recorded the follow-up Rene SG 2 with metal producer Berthus Westerhuis (known as producer for Dutch metalband God Dethroned) in 2007. Also this album was released by Langweiligkeit Records and received critical acclaim.

A collection of more than forty Rene SG-livesongs was released on the Party Hardy DVD in 2008.
Niels Turk left Rene SG during Spring 2009, he was replaced by Jacob 'El Hombre Mostacho' Bosma. Later that year Rene SG released a digital single called Arty Farty Bullshit, anticipating the new Rene SG cd Speedcola. In later years their sound shifted, with songs lasting longer than one minute.

Rene SG became known for their ultrashort and very intense blitzkrieg speedrock shows. Their songs take around 60 seconds or less, with lyrics consisting only of stripped down to the bone rock-'n-roll yells like 'Fuck You' and 'Go To Hell'. References are being made to The Ramones and Piet Mondrian. As the reviewer for Dutch underground magazine Up Magazine describes it: "Tasty godless songs like This Sucks, Fucking Hell, Go To Hell, Ride Hell For Leather and anti-romantic fuckrock like Go Fuck Yourself, Fucking en Fucked Up make this album one of the most original and übertight records made by a Dutch band in recent years."

Rene SG played over 350 gigs in the Netherlands, Belgium, Germany, France and Sweden.

== Discography ==
- Rene SG - cd, 2006 (Langweiligkeit Records)
- Rene SG 2 - cd, 2007 (Langweiligkeit Records/ Sonic Rendezvous)
- Party Hardy - DVD, 2008 (Langweiligkeit Records)
- Arty Farty Bullshit - single, 2009 (online release)
- Speedcola - cd, 2010 (Langweiligkeit Records/ Sonic Rendezvous)
- Hell Yeah! - cd-single, 2016 (Marista Records)
- Hell Yeah! - cd 2017 (Marista Records)
- Fucko - ep, 2018 (Monster Zero Records)
