= Rock the Nation Live! =

Video by Kiss
- Released: December 13, 2005
- Recorded: July 24 and 25, 2004
- Genre: Hard rock; heavy metal
- Length: 136 minutes
- Label: Kiss Records
- Director: Jonathan Beswick
- Producer: Bob Brigham; Karl Lee

Kiss chronology
Kiss Symphony: The DVD (2003)	Rock the Nation Live! (2005)	Kissology Volume One: 1974–1977 (2006)

Rock the Nation Live! is a 2005 live music DVD by American hard rock band Kiss. The DVD is notable for the addition of "Kiss Powervision", which enables the viewer to select different camera angles, each focusing on a different member of the band. The DVD is a compilation of footage from two concerts, performed in Washington, DC, and Virginia Beach, VA, on July 24 and 25, 2004.

== Reception ==
Rock the Nation Live! was certified double platinum in the US.

== Track listing ==
Disc One
No.	Title	Length
1.	"Love Gun"
2.	"Deuce"
3.	"Makin' Love"
4.	"Lick It Up"
5.	"Christine Sixteen"
6.	"She"
7.	"Tears Are Falling"
8.	"Got To Choose"
9.	"I Love It Loud"
10.	"Love Her All I Can"
11.	"I Want You"
12.	"Parasite"

Disc Two
No.	Title	Length
1.	"War Machine"
2.	"100,000 Years"
3.	"Unholy"
4.	"Shout It Out Loud"
5.	"I Was Made for Lovin' You"
6.	"Detroit Rock City"
7.	"God Gave Rock 'n' Roll to You II"
8.	"Rock and Roll All Nite"

== Charts ==
Chart (2006)	Peak position
Australian Music DVDs Chart	2
Austrian Music DVDs Chart	6
Czech Republic Videos Chart	2
Dutch Music DVDs Chart	24
Finnish Music DVDs Chart	3
Greek Music DVDs Chart	3
Italian Music DVDs Chart	12
Norwegian Music DVDs Chart	3
Spanish Music DVDs Chart	20

== Certifications ==
Region	Certification	Certified units/sales
Australia (ARIA)	Platinum	15,000^{^}
Canada (Music Canada)	2× Platinum	20,000^{^}
United States (RIAA)	2× Platinum	200,000^{^}
^{^} Shipments figures based on certification alone.
