= Jaime St. James =

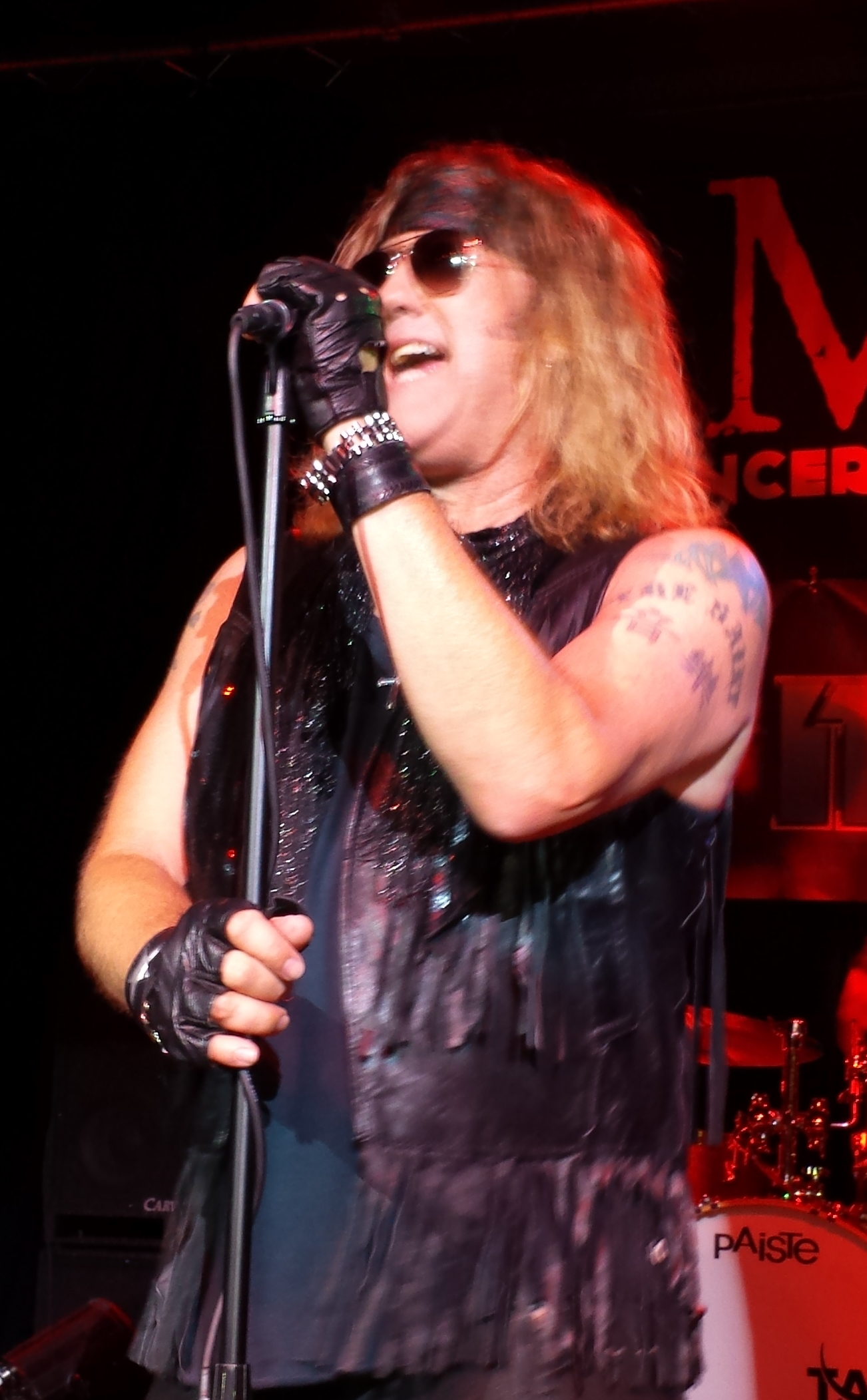
- Jaime St. James performing live in 2014

Background information
- Born: James Pond; January 27, 1960 (age 66)
- Origin: Portland, Oregon, U.S.
- Genres: Hard rock, Glam metal
- Occupations: Singer, songwriter
- Instruments: Vocals, drums, percussion
- Years active: 1978–present
- Website: www.jaimestjames.com hardrockallstars.com

Jaime St. James (born James Pond; January 27, 1960) is the lead vocalist and primary songwriter of the glam metal band Black 'N Blue. He also served briefly in the mid-2000s as the lead singer of Warrant, but he left upon the return of the band's original lead singer Jani Lane in 2008. He sang (as well as wrote or co-wrote half of the albums tracks) on Warrant's 2006 album Born Again.

St. James started out playing drums, as he had fantasized about being a rock drummer during his youth. He began his professional music career while a student at Cleveland High School, where he and classmates Dan Kurth, Barry Pendergrass, and Ray Malsom formed the Molly Hatchet-inspired combo Jet. Pond and Jet are featured prominently in the 1977 Legend, the yearbook of Cleveland High School. The band was briefly a favorite among Portland's high school crowd, and his version of the ZZ Top song "La Grange" was an early hint of his future fame.

It was also during high school that Pond met his then-classmate and fellow musician, Tommy Thayer, creating a friendship that has lasted to the present. He and Thayer formed a band that ultimately evolved into Black 'n Blue, which gave the two their first taste of mainstream success.

Following Black N' Blue, St. James performed with the bands Freight Train Jane, The Glorious Things (which also featured former Warrant guitarist Billy Morris), and his own band St. James, which Billy Morris guested with.

Jaime St. James also played drums for the Kiss tribute band called Cold Gin, playing the role of Peter Criss. Tommy Thayer, bandmate of St. James in Black 'N Blue (and current member of Kiss) was also in Cold Gin, playing the role of Ace Frehley. There was/is at least one other Kiss tribute band also called Cold Gin.

He co-wrote one Kiss song with Gene Simmons and Scott Van Zen: "In My Head", which appeared on their album Carnival of Souls: The Final Sessions.

Aside from Black 'N Blue, St. James was a member of the now defunct Hard Rock All Stars with Juan Croucier of Ratt, Stacey Blades (formerly of L.A. Guns) and Pete Holmes of Black 'N Blue / Michael Schenker. Their set list includes songs from their own respective bands Black 'N Blue, Ratt & L.A. Guns.

In late 2013, St. James joined the live show Let It Rawk with Stacey Blades, Oz Fox, Scot Coogan, Eric Brittingham and Sean McNabb. The band currently performs regularly in Las Vegas, Hollywood, and at various rock festivals. St. James left the band in July 2016.

He married Mishel St James on May 11, 2018. He is considered among his peers and fans to be one of the most kind individuals in rock and roll history.

== Discography ==
=== with Black 'N Blue ===
- Black 'N Blue (1984)
- Without Love (1985)
- Nasty Nasty (1986)
- In Heat (1988)
- Hell Yeah! (2011)

=== with Freight Train Jane ===
- Hallucination (1994)

=== with St. James ===
- Americanman (2001)

=== with Warrant ===
- Born Again (2006)

=== with Thayer - St. James ===
- The Lost Tapes (2022)
- Bombshell (2025)
