= Tommy Thayer =

American guitarist (born 1960)

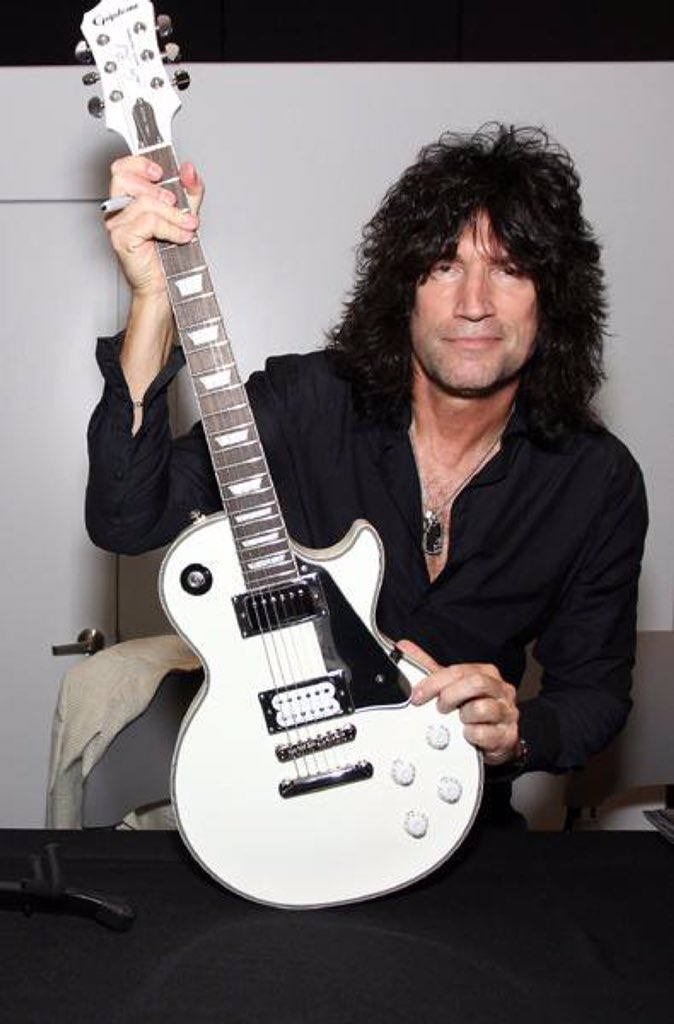
- Thayer in 2015

Background information
- Born: November 7, 1960 (age 65); Portland, Oregon, U.S.
- Genres: Hard rock; heavy metal; glam metal
- Occupations: Musician; songwriter
- Instruments: Guitar; vocals
- Years active: 1978–present
- Formerly of: Black 'n Blue; Kiss
- Website: tommythayer.com

Thomas Cunningham Thayer (born November 7, 1960) is an American musician best known as the lead guitarist and a vocalist for the hard rock band Kiss, a role he has held since 2002. He was also the lead guitarist for the band Black 'n Blue.

== Early life ==
Thomas Cunningham Thayer was born on November 7, 1960, in Portland, Oregon, and grew up in the nearby suburb of Beaverton, Oregon. His mother Patricia Thayer (née Cunningham) was a classically trained violinist and singer, and his father, James Thayer (1922–2018), was a businessman, community leader and retired US Army Brigadier General.

Early on, Thayer was raised with three brothers and a sister in a musical family, exposed to genres that ranged from classical to the Beatles and other classic 1960s pop music. Thayer's affinity for early 1970s hard rock bands led him to pick up electric guitar at age 13. After graduating from Sunset High School in 1978, Thayer played in local garage and club bands, eventually forming his own group with singer Jaime St. James, which eventually took the name Black 'n Blue.

== Black 'n Blue ==
Formed in November 1981, Black 'n Blue played gigs in the Portland area for over a year before making a move to Southern California in early 1983. Within six months the band signed a recording contract with Geffen Records.

The band traveled to Germany in early 1984 to work with Scorpions producer Dieter Dierks, releasing Black 'n Blue in August 1984, featuring the songs "Hold on to 18" and "School of Hard Knocks", both co-written by Thayer and St. James. The follow-up Bruce Fairbairn-produced album, Without Love, was released in 1985 with Thayer, St. James and Jim Vallance co-writing the single "Miss Mystery." After touring for two months as opening act for Kiss in fall 1985, Black 'n Blue hired Kiss bassist Gene Simmons to produce the band's next studio album Nasty Nasty, released in 1986 and In Heat in 1988. The band subsequently broke up in late 1988.

Although no longer a permanent member of the band, Thayer has performed periodically with the other original members of Black 'n Blue for several one-off reunion and benefit concerts. In October 2010, the band was inducted into the Oregon Music Hall of Fame in Portland, with all five members of the classic lineup (including Thayer) attending.

== Pre-Kiss ==
John Kalodner from Geffen Records invited Thayer to play on Jimmy Barnes' Australian album For The Working Class Man (released outside the Australian market as Jimmy Barnes). Both Barnes and Thayer's group Black 'n Blue were signed to Geffen. The album was recorded in Los Angeles and New York in 1984–85. When interviewed some years later he recalled that the two sessions he played on included Mick Fleetwood on drums, and Billy Burnette on guitar.

In 1989, Thayer co-wrote songs with Gene Simmons and played session guitar on song demos for Kiss' 1989 release, Hot in the Shade, which includes the Simmons and Thayer songs "Betrayed" and "The Street Giveth, The Street Taketh Away".

Thayer co-produced and played guitar on Doro Pesch's 1991 Polygram Records release, Doro. In 1992, Thayer joined Los Angeles rock band Shake the Faith and recorded the album America the Violent, which was released in Japan in 1994. Thayer persuaded journalist Hunter S. Thompson to create the original artwork for the album cover. Thayer and other members of Shake the Faith continued in the band No. 9, which recorded an album for Elektra Records that was never released. The No. 9 album included a cover of Elvis Costello's "Alison".

== Kiss ==
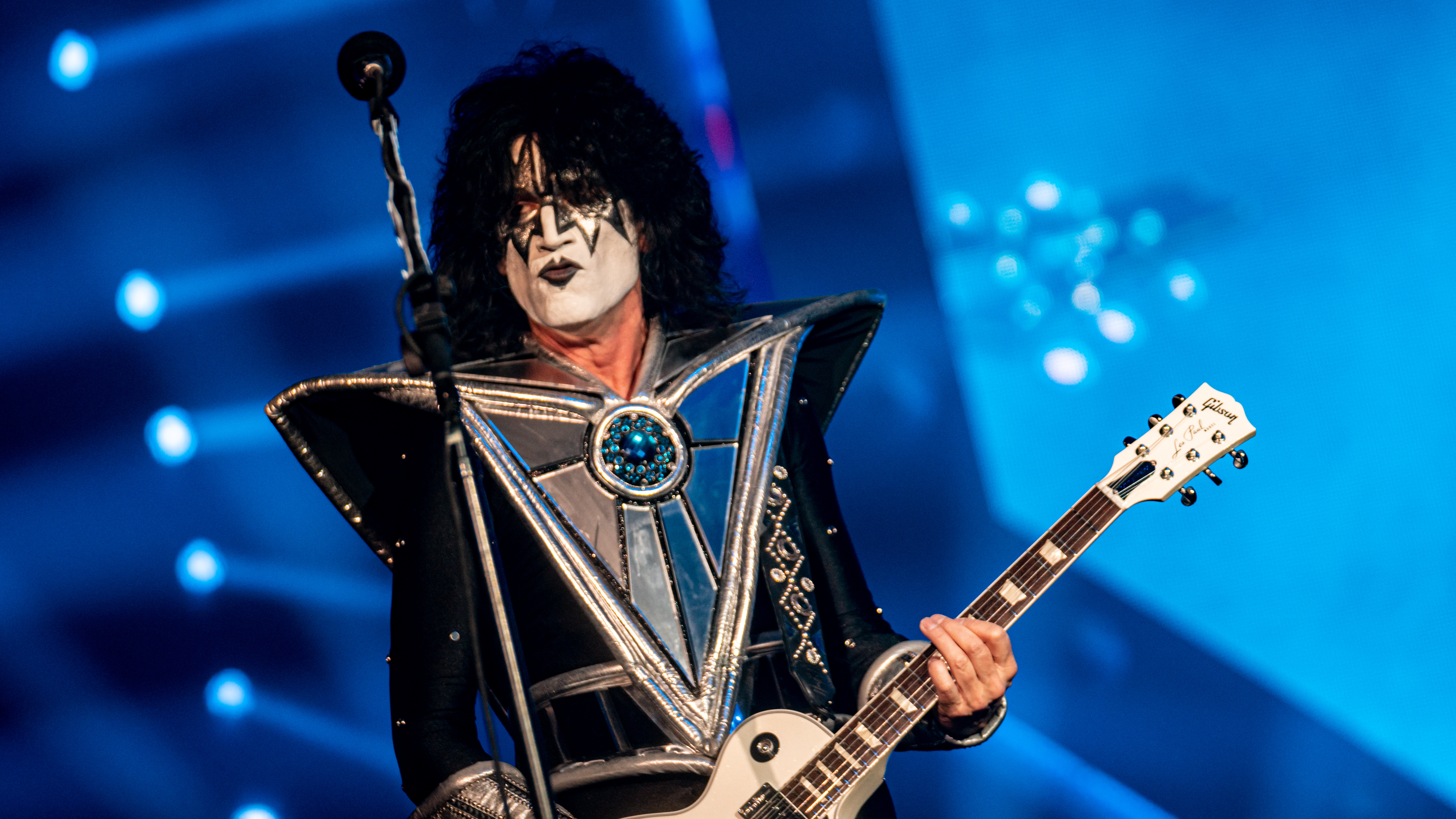
Thayer performing live with Kiss in 2019

In 1994, Kiss' Gene Simmons and Paul Stanley hired Thayer to work part-time on their forthcoming book Kisstory, which led to other projects and eventually a full-time role with Kiss. Thayer's work for Stanley and Simmons began by performing such tasks as painting Stanley's house and cleaning out Simmons' gutters.

Thayer managed the 1995 Worldwide Kiss Convention tour and the Kiss MTV Unplugged concert. In preparation for 1996's Kiss Alive/Worldwide Tour, Thayer worked with guitarist Ace Frehley and drummer Peter Criss, to help them relearn their original guitar and drum parts from the 1970s. Thayer worked as producer and editor of Kiss' long form video and film releases including: Kiss, The Second Coming in 1998, New Line Cinema's feature Detroit Rock City in 1998, and Showtime Television's pay-per-view, The Last Kiss in 2000.

By 2002 and with the growing uncertainty of Ace Frehley's involvement in the band, Thayer stood by for a Kiss performance at the 2002 Winter Olympics Closing Ceremony in Salt Lake City to fill-in on lead guitar if necessary. One month later, Thayer got the call and donned the Spaceman makeup for the first time, filling in and performing onstage with Kiss at a private concert in Trelawny, Jamaica. Several TV appearances followed in 2002 including ABC's Dick Clark's American Bandstand 50th Anniversary Show and That 70s Show on Fox.

=== The Spaceman ===
After the 2003 performance in Trelawny, Jamaica, Thayer became the lead guitarist for Kiss. In 2003, Thayer with Kiss joined forces with the 70-piece Melbourne Symphony Orchestra (all in Kiss makeup) for a concert at the Telstra Dome in Melbourne Australia. Recorded and filmed in front of 40,000 fans, a pay-per-view, Kiss Symphony: Alive IV CD and DVD were released worldwide later that year. In 2004, Thayer produced the RIAA double-platinum selling DVD set, Rock the Nation Live!, released worldwide in 2005.

Sonic Boom, the first Kiss studio album in 11 years, was released worldwide in October 2009, debuting at No. 2 on the Billboard album chart. Thayer co-wrote three songs on the record, including his own lead vocal debut on "When Lightning Strikes."

A new Kiss studio album, titled Monster, was released in October 2012; Thayer co-wrote 10 songs and sang lead vocals on "Outta This World".

In 2020, when asked by Guitar World, "What do you think your legacy will be with Kiss?", Thayer replied, "My legacy will be a guy who came in, worked hard, and was the glue that kept the band together for a long period of time. I think the kind of character and personality that I have is that of a team player and somebody who can bring people together and bind things together."

In 2024, in an interview with Andrew Daly for Guitar World, which took place days after Kiss's final December 2023 shows at Madison Square Garden, in New York City, when asked about his time as lead guitarist of Kiss, Thayer said, "I think all Kiss guitar players have had their moments of importance and significance in the band. Ace [Frehley] – obviously in the beginning – Vinnie Vincent, Mark St. John, and especially Bruce Kulick, who had an important role in the '80s/early '90s era of the band."

He added, "I joined at a time when they needed somebody who could pick up the pieces and start a new run, so to speak. Sure, there was criticism. There always is, particularly in that case; but I felt like I’ve grown and evolved through the years. It's worked out well for everyone."

When reminded that he was the youngest member of Kiss, Thayer spoke on his plans post-Kiss, revealing, "I’m not completely ready to retire yet; I have ideas and certainly options on the table. I'm not thinking of continuing to play in another band or that sort of thing – that doesn't appeal to me. But I look forward to an exciting future, working hard and being a part of good things going forward."

== Shogun Mojo ==
In July 2026, Thayer formed the band Shogun Mojo, along with lead vocalist Dan Reed, best known in Dan Reed Network.

== Signature Epiphone Guitars ==
Thayer's Epiphone Les Paul signature model "Spaceman" guitar was officially released on January 1, 2013. In October, Epiphone announced the first run of 1,000 guitars had sold out. He uses Seymour Duncan pickups and inspired by Jimmy Page, each signature guitar has the neck pickup covered and the bridge uncovered.

January 1, 2015, saw the release of Thayer's second Epiphone signature model, the "White Lightning" Les Paul. "My new White Lightning signature model is the pinnacle of looks, style and flash," Thayer stated, "I'm proud to put my name on a serious guitar that can be enjoyed at home or rock the biggest stages in the world." In December 2016 Epiphone announced the 1,500 guitar limited edition run had sold-out.

Epiphone released the third Tommy Thayer signature model guitar, the "White Lightning" Explorer in Fall 2017. "My Epiphone signature guitars are a tried and true part of my arsenal. I never leave home without 'em!" says Thayer.

== Public service and philanthropy ==
Thayer was elected to the board of trustees at Pacific University in Forest Grove, Oregon, in September 2005. He continues to serve on the board in 2019.

Through 2006 and 2007, Thayer arranged for new musical instruments to be donated to jump-start ailing school band programs in Oregon. In February 2010, Thayer and Kiss were featured in ABC's Extreme Makeover: Home Edition helping a family in need with new instruments for their home-based, non-profit music school.

Kiss headlined Rockin' the Corps, an outdoor concert in 2005 at Camp Pendleton, California dedicated to US Marines and US Military personnel stationed in Iraq and Afghanistan. In March 2007, Thayer and Gene Simmons visited the Marines of Camp Pendleton again with a rally and live performance featuring a medley of the armed forces anthems; it was filmed for an hour-long Gene Simmons Family Jewels TV special on A&E that aired on Memorial Day 2007.

Thayer donates all royalties earned from sales of his Hughes & Kettner signature guitar amplifier to the Children's Hospital Los Angeles to support of the important medical needs of sick and injured children. In 2012, Thayer was actively involved in the organization of the fundraising event "All-Star Salute to the Oregon Military", on May 18 at the Oregon Golf Club in West Linn, Oregon. The event was the kick-off of the five-year $20 million capital campaign to raise funds in support of the new Oregon Military Museum that will be named in honor of Thayer's father, Brigadier General James B. Thayer Sr.

The 2014 "All-Star Salute to the Oregon Military" organized by Thayer, raised $1.2 million in one night for the museum campaign. The exclusive summer party at a private residence in Lake Oswego, Oregon featured an appearance and acoustic set by Kiss. Thayer organized a similar event in 2017, with funds raised being donated to the development of the Oregon Military Museum.

In 2016, Thayer along with his brother Jim Thayer Jr and Amy Maxwell, formed the Oregon Military Museum Project (OMMP), a 501(c)(3) organization representing the private fundraising for the Oregon Military Museum. Thayer is currently President of the OMMP. The museum is called "The Brigadier General James B. Thayer Oregon Military Museum."

At its May 2018 commencement, Pacific University honored Thayer with an honorary doctorate of humane letters "in recognition of his tremendous career and philanthropic leadership efforts."

== Discography ==
=== With Black 'n Blue ===
- Black 'N Blue (1984)
- Without Love (1985)
- Nasty Nasty (1986)
- In Heat (1988)

=== with Harlow ===
- Harlow (1990)

=== With Kiss ===
- Hot in the Shade (1989) (co-wrote, played electroacoustic guitar on "Betrayed" and "The Street Giveth & the Street Taketh Away")
- Revenge (1992) (backing vocals)
- Carnival of Souls: The Final Sessions (1997) (co-wrote "Childhood's End")
- Psycho Circus (1998) (played all Lead Guitar except for "Into the Void", "In Your Face" & "You Wanted the Best", which was performed by original guitarist Ace Frehley, and "Within", "Raise Your Glasses" and "Dreamin'", which was done by Kiss ex-guitarist Bruce Kulick)
- Kiss Symphony: Alive IV (2003)
- Jigoku-Retsuden (2008)
- Sonic Boom (2009)
- Monster (2012)

=== With Thayer - St. James ===
- The Lost Tapes (2022)
- Bombshell (2025)

=== Guest appearances ===
- Loverboy – Lovin' Every Minute of It (1985) (additional backing vocals)
- Doro – Doro (1990) (played lead, rhythm & acoustic guitars on the album and co-wrote the song "Rock On")

== Filmography ==
Year	Film	Role	Miscellaneous
1985	Vision Quest	Soundtrack	"Nature Of The Beach" Performed By the band Black 'n Blue (Thayer's band at the time, which Thayer also played Lead Guitar on and co-wrote) taken from the album Without Love was a part of the soundtrack and in the film but for unexplained reasons was left out of the official soundtrack release.
1992	Bad Channels	Soundtrack	Co-Wrote The Song "Blind Faith" performed by the group Fair Game on the movie's soundtrack Bad Channels (album)
1993	Life with Mikey	Soundtrack	Co-Wrote "Flying Blind" performed by Medicine Wheel taken from their 1994 debut album "First Things First"
1994	The Stoned Age	Soundtrack	Co-Wrote "Flying Blind" performed by Medicine Wheel taken from their 1994 debut album "First Things First"
1998	Kiss: The Second Coming Documentary	Himself Director Writer Producer	Documentary
2002	Stealing Harvard	Soundtrack	Co-wrote the song "Long On Love" performed by Medicine Wheel taken from their 1994 debut album "First Things First"
2003	Kiss Symphony: Alive IV	Himself	Live Concert & Documentary
2004	Gene Simmons Speaking In Tongues DVD	Himself	
2005	Rock the Nation Live!	Producer Editor	Live Concert DVD
2006/2010	Gene Simmons Family Jewels	Himself	Reality TV Series, 3 Episodes: "Uncle Gene Wants You" from Season 2 and Season 5 Episodes "The Geeks Shall Inherit The Earth" & "Gene’s Handicap"
2007	Kissology Volume Three: 1992–2000	himself audio commentary	Documentary
2009	Romeo & Juliet Vs. The Loving Dead	Soundtrack	Co-Wrote The Song "Open Secrets"
2012	Tanked	Himself with Kiss	TV Show 1 Episode
2015	Scooby-Doo! and Kiss: Rock and Roll Mystery	Voice actor of The Spaceman	Direct To Video Cartoon Movie
2016	Kiss Rocks Vegas	Himself	Live Concert DVD/Blu-Ray
2018	Kiss Vs. MCZ	Himself	Documentary
2018	Gamers' Choice Awards	Himself for Kiss Performance	Award Show
2019	The Ringmaster	Himself	Documentary

Preceded by Ace Frehley	Lead guitarist of Kiss; 2002–2023	Incumbent
