= Gene Simmons =

Israeli-American musician and songwriter (born 1949)

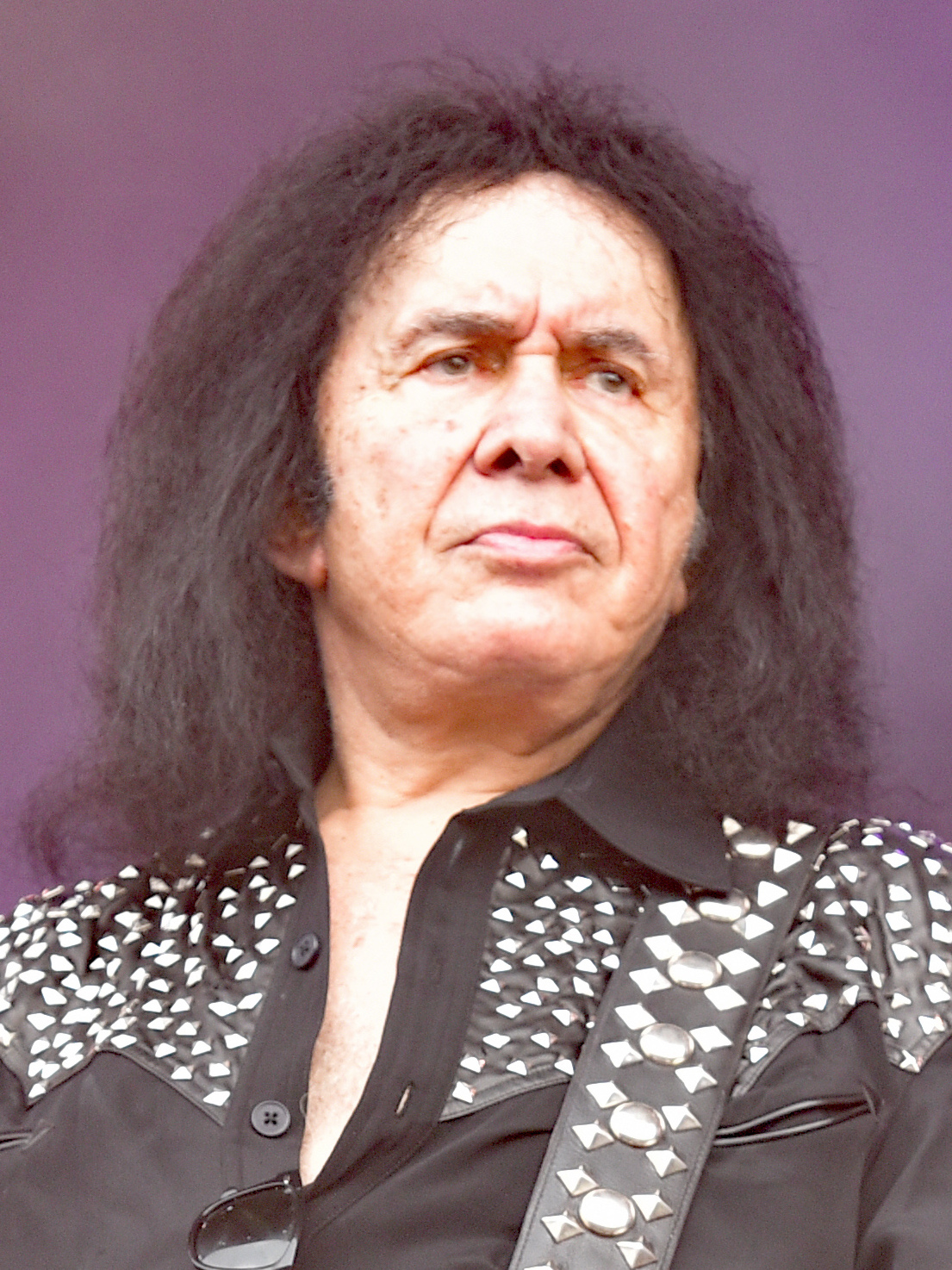
- Simmons in 2024
- Born: Chaim Witz; August 25, 1949 (age 77); Haifa, Israel
- Other names: Gene Klein; The Demon; the God of Thunder; Dr. Love; Reginald Van Helsing
- Citizenship: Israel; United States
- Occupations: Musician; singer; songwriter; record producer; actor; entrepreneur; television personality
- Years active: 1970–present
- Spouse: Shannon Tweed (m. 2011)
- Partners: Cher (1978–1980); Diana Ross (1980–1983)
- Children: Nick; Sophie
- Musical career
- Origin: New York City, U.S.
- Genres: Hard rock; heavy metal
- Instruments: Bass guitar; vocals
- Member of: The Gene Simmons Band
- Formerly of: Kiss; Wicked Lester
- Website: genesimmons.com

Gene Simmons (born Chaim Witz; Hebrew: חיים ויץ [χaˈim ˈvits]; August 25, 1949), also known by his stage persona "the Demon", is an Israeli and American musician and songwriter. He was the bassist and co-lead singer of the hard rock band Kiss, which he co-founded with Paul Stanley, Ace Frehley, and Peter Criss in 1973. Simmons, alongside Stanley, remained a constant member of the band until their retirement in 2023. Simmons is also known for his long tongue and for his reality television show, Gene Simmons Family Jewels, which aired from 2006 to 2012. He was inducted into the Rock and Roll Hall of Fame in 2014 as a member of Kiss.

== Early life and education ==
Simmons was born Chaim Witz on August 25, 1949, in Haifa, Israel, to Jewish refugees from Hungary. His mother, Flóra Kovács (later Florence Klein, then Florence Lubowski) (1925–2018), was born in Jánd in the Northern Great Plain region of eastern Hungary. She survived internment in Nazi concentration camps from November 1944 to her liberation from the Mauthausen camp in Austria on May 5, 1945. She and her brother, Larry Klein, were the only members of the family to survive the Holocaust. Witz's father, Ferenc "Feri" Yehiel Witz (1925–2002), was a carpenter whom Klein married in 1946; the couple moved to Mandatory Palestine the following year.

Witz spent his early childhood in Tirat Carmel and was raised in a practicing Jewish household. He has said that his family was "dirt poor", scraping by on rationed bread and milk. At the age of seven, he began to pick wild fruit and sell it on roadsides together with a friend.

At age eight, after his parents’ divorce, Witz and his mother immigrated to the United States, settling in Queens, New York City. His father remained in Israel, where he had another son and three daughters. In the United States, Witz changed his name to Gene Klein, adopting his mother's maiden name. When he was nine, he briefly attended a Jewish religious school, Yeshiva Torah Vodaas, before transferring to a public school. He graduated from Newtown High School.

Klein attended Sullivan County Community College in New York. He was graduated from Richmond College on Staten Island, New York with a BA in Education in 1970.

== Career ==
Before his musical career began, Klein worked a variety of jobs in New York City. A proficient typist, he served as an assistant to an editor of Vogue. He also spent six months as a sixth grade instructor on the Upper West Side.

Klein chose his stage name, Gene Simmons, in tribute to the rockabilly singer Jumpin' Gene Simmons. In other interviews, he claimed his stage name was inspired by actress Jean Simmons; he used the title of her 1946 film Great Expectations for a song on the 1976 album Destroyer. He practiced playing his guitar for hours on end.

The Beatles had a significant influence on Simmons. "There is no way I'd be doing what I do now if it wasn't for the Beatles. I was watching The Ed Sullivan Show and I saw them. Those skinny little boys, kind of androgynous, with long hair like girls. It blew me away that these four boys [from] the middle of nowhere could make that music."

Simmons became involved with his first band, Lynx, then renamed the Missing Links, when he was 15 in 1964–65. Eventually, he disbanded the band to form the Long Island Sounds, the name being a pun on the Long Island Sound. In this band was also future Wicked Lester guitarist Steve Coronel, and future lawyer/author Alan Stuart Graf who convinced Simmons to buy his first bass as the band needed a bass player. In 1967, after losing Graf the band morphed into The Love Bag.

From 1968 to 1970, Simmons attended Sullivan County Community College in Loch Sheldrake, New York for two years. He joined a new band, Bullfrog Bheer. The band recorded various home demos including Leeta; this was later included on the KISS box set. The band existed until 1970 with various line-ups.

Simmons, Coronel, and Brooke Ostrander who was in their 1969 band Coffee formed the rock band first known as Rainbow and later Wicked Lester in the early 1970s with Stanley Eisen (now known as Paul Stanley). The band recorded one album, which was never released in its entirety. Dissatisfied with Wicked Lester's sound and look, Simmons and Stanley attempted to fire their band members. Met with resistance, they instead quit Wicked Lester, walking away from their record deal with Epic Records as they decided to form the "ultimate rock band" in its place.

=== KISS ===
KISS was formed in 1973. Looking for a drummer, Simmons and Stanley found an ad placed by George Peter John Criscuola (known as Peter Criss), who was playing clubs in Brooklyn at the time; they joined and started out as a trio. During this time, Criss and Simmons also appeared on an unreleased album by Captain Sanity together with members from Criss' previous band Chelsea. Paul Frehley (better known as Ace Frehley) responded to an ad they put in The Village Voice for a lead guitar player, and soon joined them. Kiss released their self-titled debut album in February 1974. Stanley took on the role of lead performer on stage, while Simmons became the driving force behind what became an extensive Kiss merchandising franchise. The eye section of his "Demon" makeup with Kiss came from the wing design of comic book character Black Bolt.

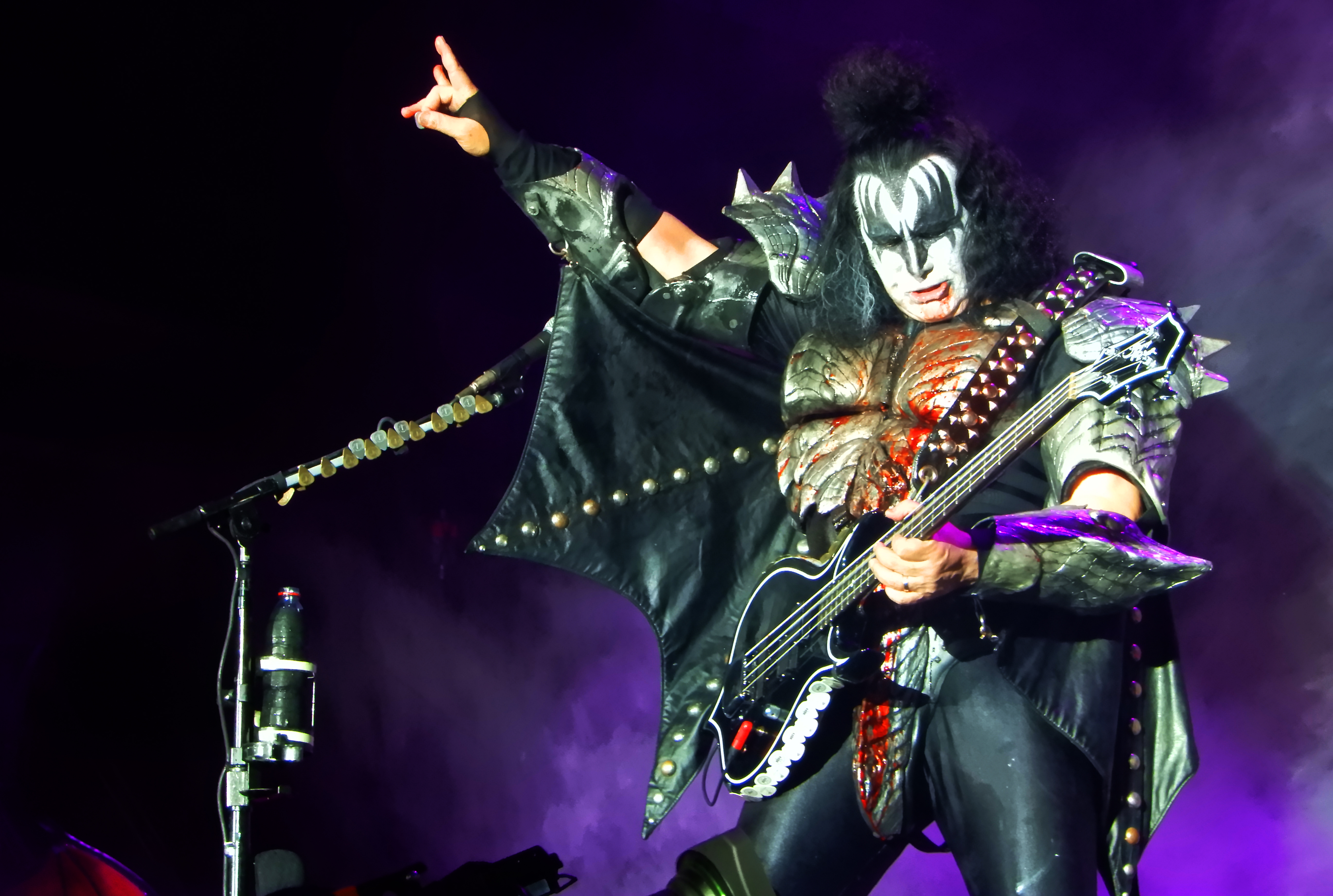
Gene Simmons in his stage makeup as "the Demon", 2023

In 1983, as Kiss's popularity was starting to fade, the band decided to take off their iconic make-up in a bold move to reinvent themselves. The change paid off, sparking a renewed wave of success that carried through the 1990s. The band hosted its own fan conventions in 1995, and fan feedback about the original Kiss members reunion influenced the highly successful 1996–1997 Alive Worldwide reunion tour. In 1998, the band released Psycho Circus. The original lineup was once again dissolved, with Tommy Thayer replacing Ace Frehley on lead guitar and Eric Singer (who performed with Kiss from 1991 through 1996) replacing Peter Criss on drums.

=== Film and television ===
In 1978, Simmons appeared with Kiss in the NBC made-for-television movie Kiss Meets the Phantom of the Park.

In 1981, Simmons auditioned at ABC for a role in a new Marcy Carsey-produced show called Grotus and was offered his own TV show, which he declined, as the pay was lower than what he made with Kiss at the time.

After turning down several other theatrical roles, Simmons made his feature film debut in the 1984 Michael Crichton thriller Runaway, starring Tom Selleck, Cynthia Rhodes and Kirstie Alley. In 1985, he appeared on the TV series Miami Vice in an episode titled "The Prodigal Son", the season premiere of the show's second season. In 1986, Simmons, along with Ozzy Osbourne, spoofed "Satanic panic" in the heavy metal-themed horror film Trick or Treat, starring Tony Fields. In 1987, he appeared in the Gary Sherman action film Wanted: Dead or Alive, starring Rutger Hauer.

Simmons created and executive produced the animated series My Dad the Rock Star with Canadian company Nelvana, which aired on Nickelodeon. In 2004, he appeared in the TV series Third Watch, playing a mob drug kingpin in the episodes "Higher Calling" and "Monsters".

In 2005, he created the six-episode comedy/reality series Mr. Romance, which aired on Oxygen. That same year, he created another reality show, Rock School, in which he taught rock music to prep school students at kirkley High school (East point Academy) in lowestoft, Suffolk ,Great Britain. The following year, he created and starred in the reality show Gene Simmons Family Jewels, chronicling life with his family, including wife Shannon Tweed and their two children, Nick and Sophie. The show aired for seven seasons on the A&E network.

In 2010, Simmons appeared as a psychic working at the Mystic Journey Bookstore in Venice, California on the American hidden camera prank TV series I Get That a Lot. In 2014, he guest-starred as himself in season 14, episode 17, of CSI: Crime Scene Investigation.

In March 2015, Simmons founded the film production company Erebus Pictures and announced as the first project the horror-thriller film Armed Response. That same year, he and Kiss appeared in the animated film Scooby-Doo! and Kiss: Rock and Roll Mystery, in which the band supplied their voices and contributed a new song.

In 2022, Simmons became a judge of the talent competition show Yoshiki Superstar Project X, airing on Hulu Japan and produced by Japanese musician and composer Yoshiki. On September 14, 2023, Simmons was one of the guest speakers chosen to introduce Yoshiki at his imprint ceremony at the TCL Chinese Theatre.

In May 2023, Gary Hamilton of Arclight Films announced the creation of a new production company in partnership with Simmons, called Simmons/Hamilton Productions. The company aims to produce 25 films over five years, focusing on action, thriller, and franchise titles. The first title is Deep Water, directed by Finnish filmmaker Renny Harlin, produced by Simmons, Hamilton, Ying Ye, and Rob Van Norden.

In October 2024, Simmons appeared as a guest judge for "Hair Metal Night" on Dancing with the Stars.

=== Other projects ===
In 1988, Simmons formed his own record label, Simmons Records, distributed by RCA Records. Their first acquisition was House of Lords, and they went on to release albums by Kobra and the Lotus, Silent Rage and Gypsy Rose, as well as Simmons's own solo releases.

Simmons has produced several albums, including WOW (1984) by Wendy O. Williams, The Right to Rock (1985) and The Final Frontier (1986) by Keel, Nasty Nasty (1986) by Black 'n Blue and the 1987 self-titled album by Ezo. In 1989, Simmons managed the recording side of Liza Minnelli's entry into mainstream pop. In 1990, he was executive producer of the self-titled album by Doro.

In 2002, Simmons launched Gene Simmons' Tongue, a men's lifestyle magazine. The magazine lasted five issues before being discontinued.

From 2006 to 2008, Simmons served in a marketing and publicity role with the Indy Racing League.

In 2012, Simmons served as the headliner for the Rock 'N' Roll All Stars tour, a high-profile rock supergroup project that brought together an all-star lineup of musicians for a series of stadium performances across South America. The official announcement of the tour and its lineup took place on March 1, 2012, during a press conference held at the historic Roxy Theatre in Hollywood, California. The event was hosted by promoter Gabe Reed and attended by Simmons himself. The tour was chronicled in the final episodes of Gene Simmons Family Jewels.

In August 2013, Simmons, Paul Stanley and manager Doc McGhee became a part of the ownership group that created the Los Angeles Kiss Arena Football League team, which played their home games at the Honda Center in Anaheim, California. The team ceased operations in 2016.

In 2017, Simmons launched "The Vault", a compilation of all of his major works, selling for $2,000.

In 2018, Simmons was named "Chief Evangelist Officer" of the Canadian cannabis company Invictus MD Strategies. He also holds a large investment stake in the company.

== Artistry ==
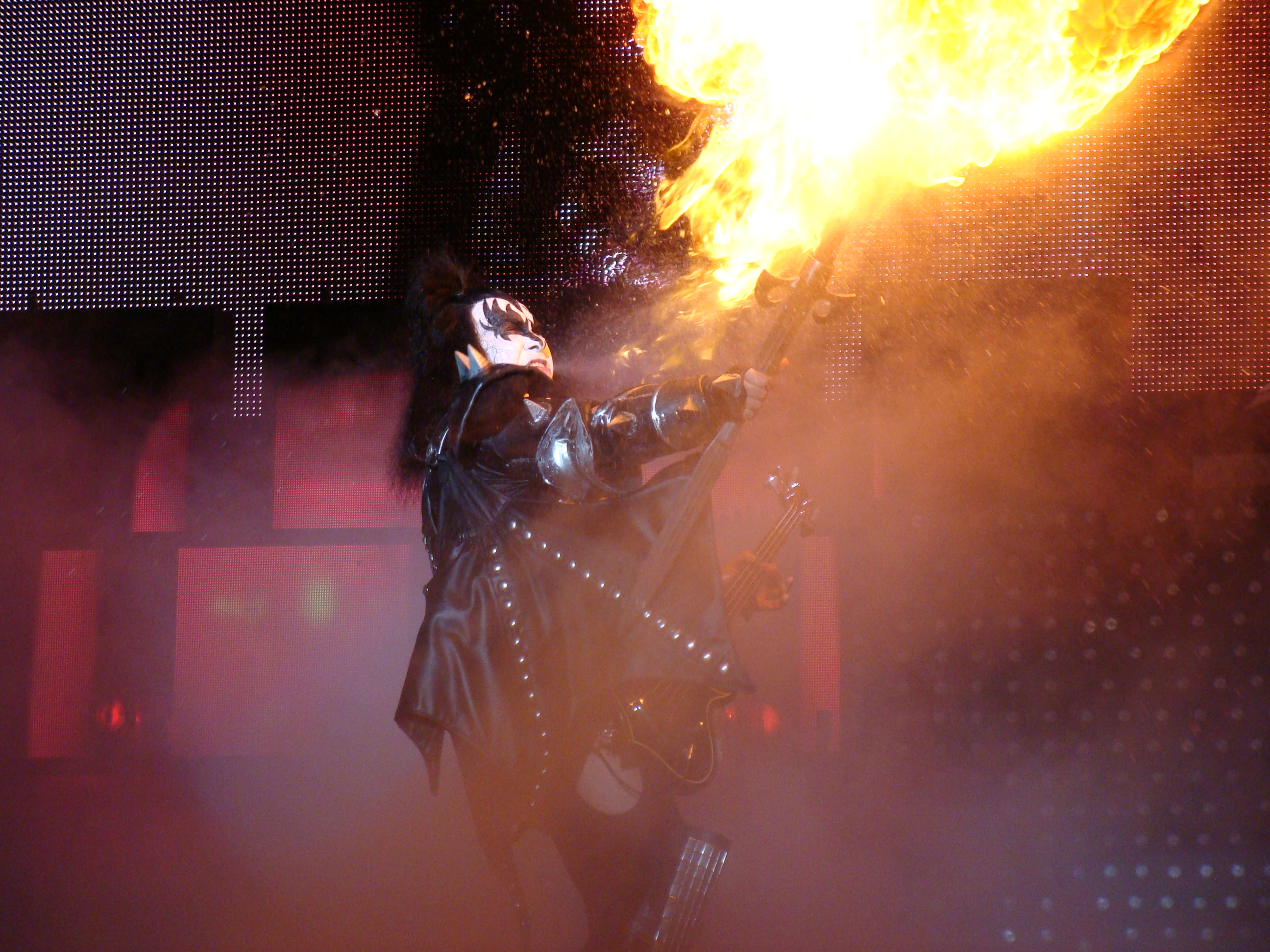
Gene Simmons fire breathing

=== Technique ===
Simmons plays bass, and lead vocals are split between Simmons and rhythm guitarist Paul Stanley in most Kiss songs. Some notable songs featuring Simmons singing lead include "God of Thunder", "Rock and Roll All Nite", "Deuce", "A World Without Heroes", "I Love It Loud", "Calling Dr. Love", "Unholy", "You Wanted the Best" (first lead vocals), and "Christine Sixteen", among others. Simmons possesses a baritone voice.

Simmons has expressed his preference for "memorable simplicity" in music as opposed to technical complexity. "I don't consider myself—and was never really interested in being—a bass virtuoso [...] I don't like show-offs in music. I'm much more attracted to things that are memorable. It's part of the joy of music for me." He has also said that while he appreciates the technical skill of jazz musicians, he believes they do not have appeal over a wide audience, saying "You can be a jazz player and be respected by musicians, but the rest of the world doesn't care."

=== Stage makeup and persona ===
Simmons' "Demon" make-up

In addition to playing bass for Kiss, Gene Simmons is well known for his long tongue, which he often sticks out during performances, a move that became one of his most recognizable trademarks. On stage, he takes on a demonic persona, complete with dramatic effects like breathing fire and spitting fake blood, further enhancing his dark, theatrical image.

Some media outlets have reported that Simmons’s tongue measures up to seven inches in length and that he even had it insured for $1 million. However, Simmons has never publicly confirmed or denied these claims, allowing the rumors to fuel his legendary status. His trademark stalking stage-moves were inspired by the creature Ymir from the movie 20 Million Miles to Earth.

== Personal life ==
Simmons resides in Los Angeles with his wife Shannon Tweed, a Canadian actress and former Playboy Playmate. Although they began dating in 1983, they did not marry until 28 years later. Simmons often joked that he and Tweed were "happily unmarried" for over 20 years. He also often paraphrased Groucho Marx, saying "Marriage is an institution, and I don't want to live in an institution". Simmons and Tweed wed on October 1, 2011, at the Beverly Hills Hotel. They have two children: Nick (born January 22, 1989) and Sophie (born July 7, 1992). He formerly had live-in relationships with Cher and Diana Ross, revealing that he fell in love with Ross while dating Cher.

Simmons has boasted many times about having sexual intercourse with thousands of women: in 2010, he claimed the tally stood at 5,000 and that he had a Polaroid picture of each liaison, including the hotel key where it took place. A 2012 episode of Gene Simmons Family Jewels captures Tweed discovering a key for the lockboxes containing the photos and confronting Simmons about it, where he eventually expresses remorse and agrees to dispose of them. The episode ends with Tweed setting the collection on fire.

Simmons is multilingual, and is able to speak Hungarian, German, English, Hebrew, and some Japanese.

Simmons believes he is an "outcast" in the rock music community due to his open disdain for drug and alcohol use, and has proudly claimed many times to have never been drunk or high on a substance in his life. He has said that the reason for his sober lifestyle was his mother, who was a Holocaust survivor. He said, "I'm my mother's only child [...] I had no right to harm my mother. Life did that enough". However, he has admitted to once accidentally becoming intoxicated on marijuana in the mid 1970s after he had mistakenly consumed several cannabis brownies, having believed that the pastry were regular brownies.

Simmons is a science fiction and comic book fan and published several science-fiction fanzines, among them Id, Cosmos (which eventually merged with Stilletto to become Cosmos-Stilletto and then Faun), Tinderbox, Sci-Fi Showcase, Mantis and Adventure. He also contributed to other fanzines, among them BeABohema and Sirruish. By 1977, however, he would write in a letter to the editor to Janus, "I haven't been active [in fandom] for about five years".

On October 7, 2025, Simmons was reportedly hospitalized following a car accident in Malibu, California, after losing consciousness while driving.

== Personal views and politics ==
=== US electoral politics ===
Simmons was a supporter of the foreign policy of the George W. Bush administration. He supported the 2003 invasion of Iraq, writing on his website: "I'm ashamed to be surrounded by people calling themselves liberal who are, in my opinion, spitting on the graves of brave American soldiers who gave their life to fight a war that wasn't theirs... in a country they've never been to... simply to liberate the people therein". In a follow-up, Simmons explained his position and wrote about his love and support for the United States: "I wasn't born here. But I have a love for this country and its people that knows no bounds. I will forever be grateful to America for going into World War II, when it had nothing to gain, in a country that was far away... and rescued my mother from the Nazi German concentration camps. She is alive and I am alive because of America. And, if you have a problem with America, you have a problem with me".

In 2010, Simmons said he regretted voting for Barack Obama and criticized the 2009 health care reforms. Following Obama's 2011 speech on the Middle East in which he called on Israel and the Palestinians to negotiate a settlement "based on the 1967 lines with mutually agreed swaps", Simmons told CNBC that Obama was gravely misguided. "If you have never been to the moon, you can't issue policy about the moon. For the president to be sitting in Washington D.C. and saying, 'Go back to your '67 borders in Israel' – how about you live there and try to defend an indefensible border – nine miles (14 km) wide?" Simmons also accused the United Nations of being "the most pathetic body on the face of the earth".

In an April 2012 interview, Simmons endorsed Republican Mitt Romney for president: "America should be in business and it should be run by a businessman."

In an August 2021 interview, regarding the honesty of Donald Trump and his first administration, Simmons said, "[W]e all lie to some extent, but what happened the last four years was beyond anything I ever thought imaginable from people who had lots of power — not just him, but the administration, everybody."

On November 10, 2021, he stated that people who refused to get the COVID-19 vaccine are "an enemy" and called them "evil".

=== Views on Israel ===
In March 2011, Simmons visited his birth country, Israel. He described the trip as a "life changing experience". He talked about how he still feels that he is an Israeli: "I'm Israeli. I'm a stranger in America. I'm an outsider". While there, Simmons met his half-brother Kobi, and triplet half-sisters Drora, Sharon and Ogenia. He also visited his estranged father's grave. Simmons announced he had plans to take Kiss to Israel, something that happened first in 2015 with a concert in Tel Aviv. He has said that he is an ardent supporter of Israel. At a press conference in Israel, he spoke in both Hebrew and English. During his visit to Israel in 2011, he also stated that the artists refusing to perform in Israel for political reasons are "stupid".

During the 2006 Lebanon War between Israel and Hezbollah in Lebanon, Simmons sent a televised message of support (in both English and Hebrew) to an Israeli soldier seriously wounded in fighting in Lebanon, calling him his "hero".

On November 6, 2015, he attended a Friends of the Israel Defense Forces gala in Beverly Hills, which raised more than $31 million.

In a 2024 interview with Sky News Australia, Simmons called the Gaza War protests "well intentioned but misinformed".

=== Views on Islam ===
In a 2004 interview in Melbourne, Australia, regarding Islamic extremists, Simmons described Islam as a "vile culture", saying that Muslim women had to walk behind their husbands and were not allowed to be educated or to own houses. He said: "They want to come and live right where you live and they think that you're evil." Muslim media personality Susan Carland argued that Simmons's stereotyping of Muslims was inaccurate. Simmons later clarified his comments on his website, saying he had been talking specifically about Muslim extremists.

== Controversies ==
=== NPR interview ===
During an interview on the National Public Radio (NPR) program Fresh Air on February 2, 2002, Simmons told Terry Gross: "If you want to welcome me with open arms, I'm afraid you're also going to have to welcome me with open legs", paraphrasing a lyric from the Who's 1981 song "You Better You Bet". Gross replied: "That's a really obnoxious thing to say". At the time, Simmons refused to grant permission to NPR to make the interview available online. However, it appears in print in Gross' book All I Did Was Ask and unauthorized transcripts are available. NPR re-broadcast part of the interview in August 2007. In a 2014 interview with HuffPost, Simmons noted he was upset over what he perceived as Gross's "holier-than-thou" attitude, which included mislabeling his band Kiss as "the Kiss".

=== File-sharing controversy ===
In 2007, Simmons spoke out against music piracy, and called for file-sharers to be sued. A year later, he threatened further lawsuits, and to withhold new recordings if file-sharing continued. In 2010, Anonymous staged a DDoS on his website, prompting Simmons to hit back with provocative comments once he was back online, at which point Anonymous staged a second DDoS, taking Simmons's site down again.

In September 2014, Simmons said "The death of rock was not a natural death. Rock did not die of old age. It was murdered". Simmons blames file sharing and that no one values music "enough to pay you for it" for the decline of the rock music scene.

=== Comments on suicide and depression ===
In July 2014, Simmons made comments in an interview with Songfacts in which he goaded those who announce their intention to commit suicide.

I never understand, because I always call them on their bluff. I'm the guy who says 'Jump!' when there's a guy on top of a building who says, "That's it, I can't take it anymore, I'm going to jump." Are you kidding? Why are you announcing it? Shut the fuck up, have some dignity and jump! You've got the crowd.

The comments drew criticism from Nikki Sixx of Mötley Crüe, who had suffered from depression in the past. Following his comments, both Triple M and Winnipeg radio station Power 97 stated that they were pulling all Kiss songs from their lineup in protest. Simmons later clarified his comments and apologized for the incident.

=== Fox & Friends incident ===
On November 16, 2017, Simmons made an appearance on Fox & Friends to promote a new book, but shortly afterward, he burst into a staff meeting uninvited, unbuttoning his shirt and telling jokes. The next day, on November 17, Fox News announced that Simmons was banned for life from their program, as well as from entering any of the company's properties. Simmons later issued a statement saying that he has "a tremendous amount of respect" for the company's workers and apologized for "unintentionally offending" any staff members during his visit.

=== Sexual assault allegations ===
In 2018, Simmons settled a sexual assault lawsuit with an unnamed radio personality, who accused him of touching her inappropriately. The woman claimed that Simmons touched her and "turned standard interview questions into sexual innuendos." Despite the settlement, Simmons denied the allegations.

In 2019, Ace Frehley, Simmons's former bandmate in Kiss, stated that Simmons had groped his wife, calling him an "asshole and a sex addict".

== Philanthropy ==
Simmons is a known advocate for ChildFund International's work. He traveled to Zambia during his Gene Simmons Family Jewels show to visit several of his sponsored children, of whom he has more than 140. Simmons said that the trip "[was] a stark reminder that life doesn't treat everyone the same".

Simmons's family received the MEND Humanitarian Award for their philanthropic efforts and support for Mending Kids International at the organization's annual gala on November 9, 2013. The award was presented by Mel Gibson. In his acceptance speech, Simmons spoke of his own difficult childhood in Israel in a bullet-riddled house. He recalled his mother's excitement when they received a CARE box one day.

Simmons helped found "The Children Matter", which is a collaborative initiative with the charity MATTER that fights to give children around the world access to health care.

He was an advocate for public safety during the COVID-19 pandemic, encouraging people to wear face masks and follow social distance protocols.

== Awards and recognition ==
On January 28, 2011, Simmons was saluted by the city of Dallas, Texas for his work with the Wounded Warrior Project for injured soldiers, where he was presented the key to the city. Simmons and Tweed spent four days visiting the U.S. Army base at Fort Hood before hosting the Aces & Angels Celebrity Salute to the Troops charity event in Dallas on February 2. The event was held in Fair Park and the street in front of the Centennial building was temporarily renamed "Gene Simmons Boulevard" in his honor. All events were filmed for Gene Simmons Family Jewels.

On June 15 of the same year, Simmons was given the key to the city in Winnipeg, Manitoba. In 2012, he was awarded the Golden God award by Revolver magazine.

In 2013, the Smithsonian National Museum of American History accepted an autographed Gene Simmons Axe bass into their collection from John Upshaw Downs Jr. The Smithsonian wrote, in part: "The bass will now be cared for in our permanent collections... We are happy to include the Axe bass as it relates to the impact Mr. Simmons and his band Kiss have had on American culture, especially in the creation of a unique and iconic brand that has been embraced by fans worldwide ... The story of Mr. Simmons' American experience deserves to be preserved. An immigrant and son of a holocaust survivor, he used creative vision and entrepreneurial acumen to make a significant impact for our nation's popular culture, becoming an iconic figure in American music and entertainment."

Simmons is an honorary board member of Little Kids Rock, a national nonprofit that works to restore and revitalize music education in disadvantaged U.S. public schools. Gene Simmons Family Jewels visited a Little Kids Rock classroom and featured the segment on the show. He also decorated a guitar for auction with his son Nick.

On December 15, 2014, Simmons was awarded the Golden Medal by the Reial Cercle Artístic de Barcelona (Royal Artistic Circle of Barcelona).

In 2020, Simmons won two Guinness World Records for "highest flame projection in a music concert" and "most flame projections launched simultaneously in a music concert." Both of the records were established at the KISS 2020 Goodbye concert.

On December 6, 2025, Simmons and the other three founding members of Kiss—Paul Stanley, Peter Criss and Ace Frehley (who had died the previous October)—were among the recipients of the 2025 Kennedy Center Honors.

== Discography ==
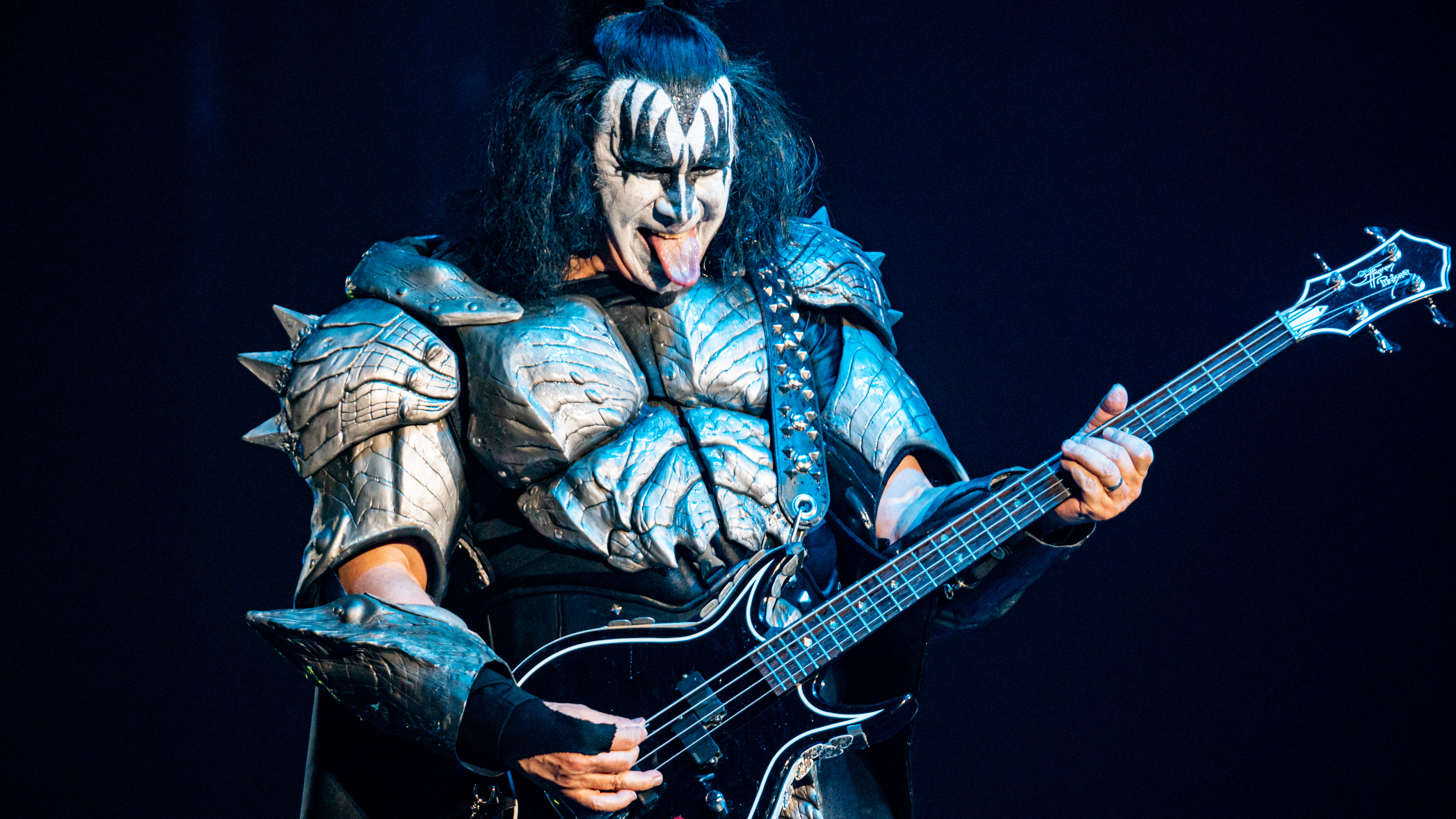
Simmons performing in 2019

=== Solo ===
Studio albums

- Gene Simmons (1978)
- Asshole (2004)

Other releases

- Vault (box set, 2017)
- Speaking in Tongues (DVD, 2004)

=== Guest appearances ===
- Wendy O. Williams – WOW (1984): Bass guitar (credited as "Reginald Van Helsing"), producer; co-writer ("I Love Sex (and Rock and Roll)", "It's My Life", "Thief in the Night", "Legends Never Die", "Ain't None of Your Business")
- Bruce Kulick – BK3 (2010): Co-writer, vocals ("Ain't Gonna Die")
- Engelbert Humperdinck – Engelbert Calling (2014): Duet vocals ("Spinning Wheel")
- Lita Ford – Time Capsule (2016): Bass guitar; co-writer ("Rotten to the Core")
- Ace Frehley – Spaceman (2018): Co-writer ("Without You I'm Nothing", "Your Wish Is My Command"), bass guitar ("Without You I'm Nothing")

== Filmography ==
=== Film ===
Year	Film	Role	Bandmates	Miscellaneous
1978	Kiss Meets the Phantom of the Park	The Demon/Himself	Peter Criss, Ace Frehley, Paul Stanley	TV movie
1984	Runaway	Dr. Charles Luther		
1986	Never Too Young to Die	Carruthers / Velvet Von Ragnar		
1986	Trick or Treat	Nuke (radio DJ)		
1986	Wanted: Dead or Alive	Malak Al Rahim		
1988	The Decline of Western Civilization Part II: The Metal Years	Himself	Paul Stanley	Documentary
1989	Red Surf	Doc		
1999	Detroit Rock City	Himself	Peter Criss, Ace Frehley, Paul Stanley	Simmons also produced
2000	At Any Cost	Dennis Berg		VH1 TV movie
2001	Wish You Were Dead	Vinny		
2002	The New Guy	Reverend		
2008	Detroit Metal City	Jack lll Dark		Japanese movie
2009	Extract	Joe Adler		
2010	Expecting Mary	Taylor		
2010	Rush: Beyond the Lighted Stage	Himself		Documentary
2013	Sample This: The Incredible Story of the Incredible Bongo Band	Himself		Documentary
2015	Scooby-Doo! and Kiss: Rock and Roll Mystery	Himself	Paul Stanley, Eric Singer, Tommy Thayer	Voice only
2016	We Are X	Himself		Documentary
2016	Why Him?	Himself	Paul Stanley	Cameo
2017	Armed Response	Male Suspect		
2022	In Search of Tomorrow	Himself		Documentary
TBA	Untitled Scooby-Doo! and Kiss: Rock and Roll Mystery Sequel	Himself	Paul Stanley, Eric Singer, Tommy Thayer	Voice only

=== Television appearances ===
Year	Show	Episode	Role	Bandmates	Miscellaneous
1974	Dick Clark's - In Concert	March 29, 1974	Himself	Peter Criss, Ace Frehley, Paul Stanley	Performed "Nothin' To Lose, Firehouse, Black Diamond
1974	The Mike Douglas Show	June 11, 1974	Himself	Peter Criss, Ace Frehley, Paul Stanley	Kiss Performed "Firehouse".
1975	The Midnight Special	April 1, 1975	Himself	Peter Criss, Ace Frehley, Paul Stanley	Performed "Deuce, She, Black Diamond, (C'mon & Love Me - not televised)
1976	The Paul Lynde Halloween Special	October 29, 1976	Himself	Peter Criss, Ace Frehley, Paul Stanley	Performed "Detroit Rock City", "King of the Night Time World", and "Beth"
1979	Tomorrow		Himself	Peter Criss, Ace Frehley, Paul Stanley	
1985	Miami Vice	"The Prodigal Son"	Newton Blade		
1986	The Hitchhiker	"O.D.Feelin'" January 28, 1986	Mr. Big		
1997	Action League Now!	"Rock-A-Big-Baby"	Toy version of himself	Peter Criss, Ace Frehley, Paul Stanley	Performed "Rock and Roll All Nite"
1998	MADtv	October 31, 1998 (#406)	Himself	Peter Criss, Ace Frehley, Paul Stanley.	Halloween special; performed in five sketches
1998	Millennium	"...Thirteen Years Later" October 30, 1998	Hector Leachman	Paul Stanley, Peter Criss, Ace Frehley	
2001	Family Guy	"A Very Special Family Guy Freakin' Christmas"	Animated version of himself	Peter Criss, Ace Frehley, Paul Stanley	
2001	Who Wants To Be a Millionaire?	May 27, 2001	Himself		Won $32,000 for a charity
2001	The Daily Show with Jon Stewart	June 12, 2001	Himself		
2002	Family Guy	"Road to Europe"	Animated version of himself	Peter Criss, Ace Frehley, Paul Stanley	Lois Griffin claims she dated Gene Simmons while they were in high school, and calls him by his birth name, Chaim Witz.
2002	The Tonight Show with Jay Leno	September 6, 2002	Himself		
2003	King of the Hill	"Reborn to Be Wild"	Jessie		
2004	Third Watch	"Higher Calling"	Donald Mann		
2004	Third Watch	"Monsters"	Donald Mann		
2004	Third Watch	"More Monsters"	Donald Mann		
2005	American Idol	"Auditions: New Orleans"	Himself- guest judge		
2005	Family Guy	"Don't Make Me Over"	Animated version of himself/ Prisoner No. 3		
2005	Mind of Mencia	Episode #1.7	Himself		
2005	Rock School		Himself	Presenter	
2006	The View	August 1, 2006	Himself		Promotional appearance for Gene Simmons Family Jewels
2007	SpongeBob SquarePants	"20,000 Patties Under the Sea"	Sea Monster		
2007	Shrink Rap	"Gene Simmons"	Himself		UK's More4 show
2008	Entertainment Tonight	January 2, 2008	Himself		
2008	Jimmy Kimmel Live!	January 18, 2008	Himself		
2008	Rachael Ray	March 11, 2008	Himself		
2008	Criss Angel Mindfreak	"Mindfreaking with the Stars"	Himself		
2008	Ugly Betty	"The Kids Are Alright"	Himself		
2008	Ugly Betty	"A Thousand Words by Friday"	Himself		
2008	Are You Smarter Than a 5th Grader?	Episode #3.9	Himself		Won $500,000 for the Elizabeth Glaser Pediatric AIDS Foundation charity
2008	The Celebrity Apprentice	First three episodes	Himself		Won $20,000 for the Elizabeth Glaser Pediatric AIDS Foundation charity; Fired in the third episode
2008	Jingles		Celebrity judge		Mark Burnett reality show
2009	Glenn Martin DDS	Glenn Gary, Glenn Martin	himself		
2009	American Idol	Season Finale	Himself	Eric Singer, Tommy Thayer, Paul Stanley	Performed medley of 3 songs with contestant Adam Lambert
2009	The Fairly OddParents	"Wishology – Part 1: The Big Beginning"	Animated version of himself	Eric Singer, Tommy Thayer, Paul Stanley	
2009	The Fairly OddParents	"Wishology – Part 3: The Final Ending"	Animated version of himself	Eric Singer, Tommy Thayer, Paul Stanley	
2010	I Get That a Lot	Episode 2	As Himself		Simmons appeared as a psychic working at the Mystic Journey Bookstore in Venice, California
2010	Extreme Makeover: Home Edition	Episode 160	As Himself		Kiss made a personal appearance during the Wagstaff family's vacation in Disneyland and honored them as special guests at one of their concerts. Kiss also made a personal appearance at a local school where a donation of new musical instruments was made in the Wagstaff family's name.
2010	I'm in a Rock 'n' Roll Band!	Episode 1 And 5	As Himself		Discussing the requirements of being in a rock band.
2011	Castle	To Love and Die in LA	As Himself		
2014	CSI: Crime Scene Investigation	Long Road Home	As Himself		
2014	American Idol	Season 13 Finale	Himself	Eric Singer, Tommy Thayer, Paul Stanley	Performed with Caleb Johnson
2014	Welcome to Sweden	S1 Ep4: Get a Job/Farthinder	Himself		
2015	Scorpion	S2 Ep1:	Himself		September 30, 2015, Himself, Interview
2016	Angie Tribeca (2016 TBS TV Series)	S1 Ep9:	Himself		
2016	Dr.Phil		Himself (special guest)		Gives advice to guest Kris about prioritizing his parents, partner, and getting a job over his addiction of being a rockstar.
2018	Jeopardy!	October 31 episode	Himself		Reading clues about Halloween in costume and makeup. As a publicity stunt, Alex Trebek was briefly made up and costumed as Simmons. Short video of that appeared as a commercial bump; longer video posted to show web site.
2019	Kouhaku Uta Gassen	December 31, 2019	Himself	Eric Singer, Tommy Thayer, Paul Stanley	Performed "Rock And Roll All Nite –YOSHIKISS version" with Yoshiki
2020	Ridiculousness	January 9	Himself		
2022	Hell's Kitchen	"Just Wingin' It"	Himself		
2023	2023 AFL Grand Final		Himself	Eric Singer, Tommy Thayer, Paul Stanley	Performed "I Was Made for Lovin' You", "Shout It Out Loud" and "Rock and Roll All Nite" during the pre-match entertainment
2024	Dancing with the Stars	October 8, 2024	Himself - guest judge		

=== Music video appearances ===
In 1994, Simmons appears as auditioning for the band with actor Al Lewis & comedian Gilbert Gottfried in a music video for "I'll Talk My Way Out Of It" by Howard Stern comedian Stuttering John. In 2007, he appeared alongside other celebrities, as well as regular people, in the music video for "Rockstar" by Nickelback.

=== Video game appearances ===
Gene Simmons is a playable character in Tony Hawk's Underground, unlocked when completing the story mode on Normal difficulty, and also appears with his Kiss bandmates in the Hotter Than Hell level to play one of three songs upon collecting the four K-I-S-S letters.

Gene Simmons's Kiss character, the Demon, is a playable character in Kiss: Psycho Circus: The Nightmare Child. Simmons also has a large role in the 2010 music video game Guitar Hero: Warriors of Rock. In addition to narrating the main storyline, voicing the character Demigod of Rock in cutscenes, and doing advertising for the game, the Kiss song "Love Gun" is playable.

A Dark-Normal Type Pokémon introduced in Pokémon Sword and Shield, known as Obstagoon the Blocking Pokémon, resembles Gene Simmons's Demon character.

== Published works ==
- Me, Inc.: Build an Army of One, Unleash Your Inner Rock God, Win in Life and Business, Gene Simmons (ISBN 0-062-32261-3)
- Kiss and Make-Up, Gene Simmons (ISBN 0-609-81002-2)
- Sex Money Kiss, Gene Simmons (ISBN 1-893224-86-4)
- Kiss: The Early Years, Gene Simmons and Paul Stanley (ISBN 0-609-81028-6)
- Kiss: Behind the Mask, David Leaf and Ken Sharp (ISBN 978-0-446-69524-4)
- Ladies of the Night: A Historical and Personal Perspective on the Oldest Profession in the World, Gene Simmons (ISBN 1-59777-501-0)
- 27: The Legend & Mythology of the 27 Club (ISBN 978-1-57687-886-6)
