= Jeff Warner (guitarist) =

- Also known as: Woop
- Born: 31 January 1962 (age 64)
- Genres: Glam metal
- Occupation: Musician
- Instruments: Guitar; Keyboards
- Formerly of: Black 'N Blue

Jeff Warner is a guitarist who is known for playing for the band Black 'N Blue. According to the liner notes of Black 'N Blue's Ultimate Collection, he replaced another guitarist, named Virgil Ripper, who was briefly in Black 'N Blue in the same slot that Jeff Warner was later in (that of being co-guitarist with Tommy Thayer).
