= Sweet discography =

The Sweet discography
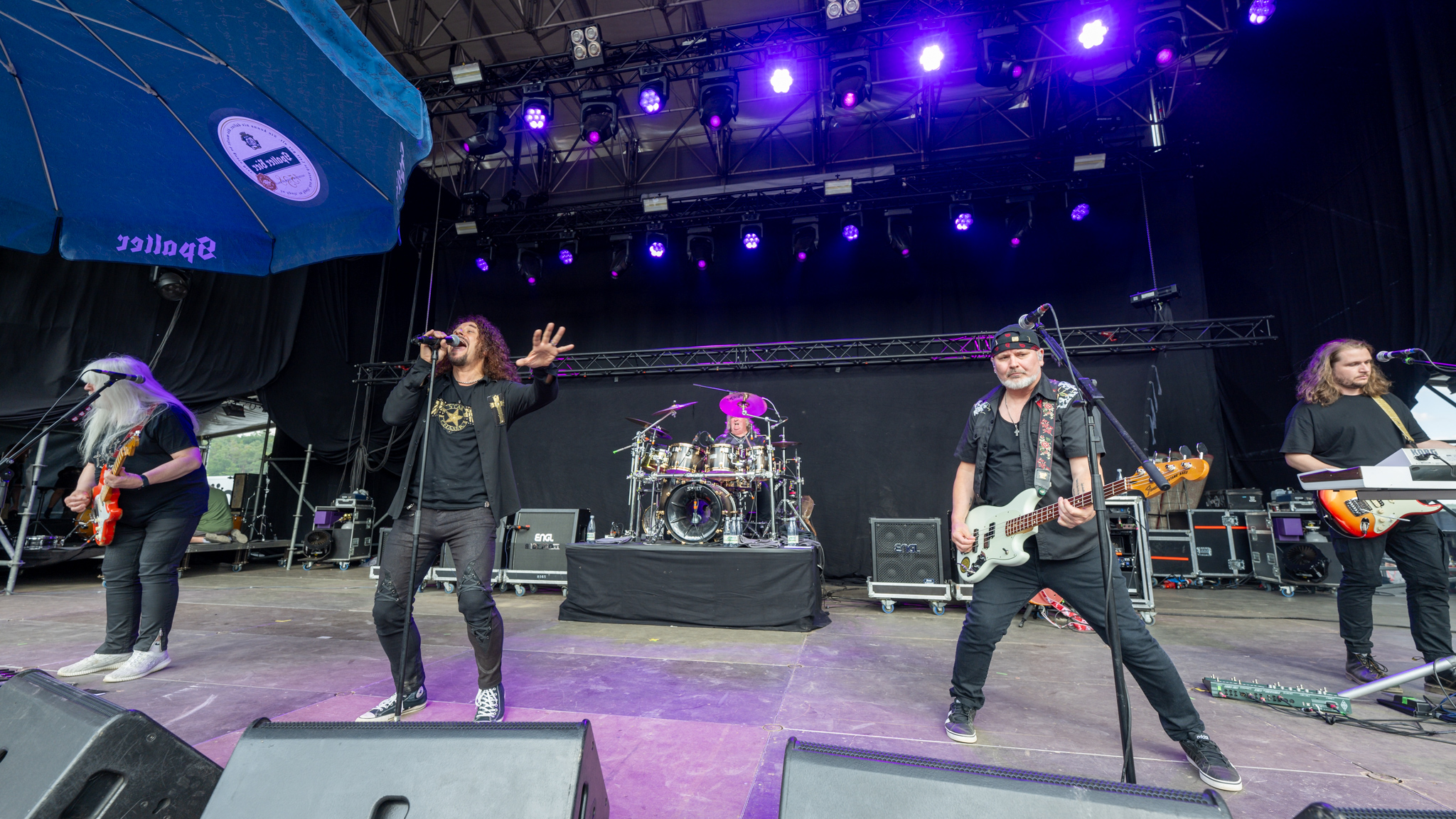
- Sweet performing in 2023
- Studio albums: 15
- Live albums: 11
- Compilation albums: 24
- Singles: 53
- Video albums: 13
- Music videos: 34
- Box sets: 4

The following is a comprehensive discography of British rock band Sweet.

== Albums ==
=== Studio albums ===
Title	Album details	Peak chart positions										Certifications
Title	Album details	UK	AUS	AUT	CAN	FIN	GER	NL	NOR	SWE	US	Certifications
Funny How Sweet Co-Co Can Be	Released: 26 November 1971; Label: RCA; Formats: LP, MC	—	—	—	—	1	—	—	—	—	—	
Sweet Fanny Adams	Released: 26 April 1974; Label: RCA; Formats: LP, MC, 8-track	27	33	6	—	9	2	—	12	4	—	DEN: Silver; UK: Gold
Desolation Boulevard	Released: 15 November 1974; Label: RCA, Capitol; Formats: LP, MC, 8-track	—	13	—	5	9	9	—	17	2	25	DEN: Silver; UK: Silver; US: Gold; CAN: Gold
Give Us a Wink	Released: 16 February 1976; Label: RCA, Capitol; Formats: LP, MC, 8-track	—	17	—	11	—	9	—	15	3	27	
Off the Record	Released: April 1977; Label: RCA, Capitol; Formats: LP, MC, 8-track	—	51	5	90	29	11	—	20	14	151	
Level Headed	Released: January 1978; Label: RCA, Capitol; Formats: LP, MC, 8-track	—	40	17	52	—	15	26	—	26	52	
Cut Above the Rest	Released: April 1979; Label: Polydor, Capitol; Formats: LP, MC, 8-track	—	87	—	—	—	49	—	—	—	151	
Waters Edge	Released: April 1980; Label: Polydor, Capitol; Formats: LP, MC; Released in the US and Canada as Sweet VI	—	—	—	—	—	—	—	—	—	—	
Identity Crisis	Released: November 1982; Label: Polydor; Formats: LP, MC	—	—	—	—	—	—	—	—	—	—	
A (by Andy Scott's Sweet)	Released: 1992; Label: SPV; Formats: CD, LP, MC	—	—	—	—	—	—	—	—	—	—	
The Answer (by Andy Scott's Sweet)	Released: 1995; Label: Pseudonym; Formats: CD	—	—	—	—	—	—	—	—	—	—	
Sweetlife (by Andy Scott's Sweet)	Released: 1 March 2002; Label: Delicious; Formats: CD	—	—	—	—	—	—	—	—	—	—	
New York Connection (by Andy Scott's Sweet)	Released: 27 April 2012; Label: Self-released; Formats: CD	—	—	—	—	—	—	—	—	—	—	
Isolation Boulevard (by Andy Scott's Sweet)	Released: 18 December 2020; Label: Prudential; Formats: CD, digital download	—	—	—	—	—	—	—	—	—	—	
Full Circle (by Andy Scott's Sweet)	Released: 20 September 2024; Label: Prudential; Formats: CD, digital download	—	—	—	—	—	19	—	—	—	—	
"—" denotes releases that did not chart or were not released in that territory.

=== Live albums ===
Title	Album details
Live at the Marquee	Released: March 1989; Label: SPV, Maze; Formats: CD, 2×LP
Rock & Roll Disgrace – Live in Japan	Released: November 1992; Label: Receiver; Formats: CD
Land of Hope and Glory	Released: April 1993; Label: Receiver; Formats: CD
Blockbuster – Live on Stage	Released: 1993; Label: Music de Luxe; Formats: CD
Greatest Hits – Live	Released: 2 November 1994; Label: AIM; Formats: CD
Live in Denmark 1976	Released: 1998; Label: Self-released; Formats: CD
Live at the Rainbow 1973 – The Complete Concert	Released: 25 October 1999; Label: RCA; Formats: CD
Live! In America	Released: July 2009; Label: Self-released; Formats: CD
Live – Are You Ready?	Released: 18 October 2011; Label: Varèse Sarabande; Formats: CD
Desolation Boulevard Revisited	Released: 6 November 2012; Label: Self-released; Formats: digital download
Sweet Fanny Adams Revisited	Released: 19 April 2013; Label: Self-released; Formats: CD

=== Compilation albums ===
Title	Album details	Peak chart positions									Certifications
Title	Album details	UK	AUS	AUT	CAN	FIN	GER	NOR	SWE	US	Certifications
Gimme Dat Ding	Released: December 1970; Label: Music for Pleasure; Formats: LP; Split album with the Pipkins	—	—	—	—	—	—	—	—	—	
The Sweet's Biggest Hits	Released: October 1972; Label: RCA; Formats: LP, MC, 8-track	—	58	—	—	3	30	—	—	—	DEN: Silver
The Sweet	Released: July 1973; Label: Bell; Formats: LP, MC, 8-track	—	—	—	46	—	—	—	—	191	
Sweet Singles Album	Released: September 1975; Label: RCA; Formats: LP, MC	—	2	—	—	—	—	—	—	—	
Strung Up	Released: November 1975; Label: RCA; Formats: 2×LP, MC, 8-track; Double live and compilation album	—	10	10	—	—	17	12	4	—	
Sweet's Golden Greats	Released: October 1977; Label: RCA; Formats: LP, MC	—	—	—	—	—	—	—	—	—	
Teenage Rampage	Released: 1981; Label: Starcall; Formats: LP	—	53	—	—	—	—	—	—	—	
Sweet 16 – It's It's... Sweet's Hits	Released: August 1984; Label: Anagram; Formats: LP, MC	49	17	—	—	—	—	—	—	—	
Hard Centres – The Rock Years	Released: 13 July 1987; Label: Zebra; Formats: CD, LP	—	—	—	—	—	—	—	—	—	
Starke Zeiten	Released: March 1988; Label: Ariola; Formats: CD, LP, MC	—	—	—	—	—	26	—	—	—	
Blockbusters	Released: 30 October 1989; Label: RCA; Formats: CD, LP, MC	—	—	—	—	—	—	—	—	—	
The Best of Sweet	Released: 1992; Label: Capitol; Formats: CD	—	—	—	—	—	—	—	—	—	
The Ballroom Blitz & More Sweet Hits	Released: January 1993; Label: BMG/RCA; Formats: CD, MC	—	19	—	—	—	—	—	—	—	
Gold – 20 Super Hits	Released: 20 September 1993; Label: BMG/RCA; Formats: CD, MC	—	—	—	—	—	44	—	—	—	
Ballroom Hitz – The Very Best of Sweet	Released: February 1996; Label: PolyGram TV; Formats: CD, MC	15	—	—	—	—	—	—	—	—	UK: Silver
Originals – The Best 37 Glamrock Songs Ever	Released: 30 November 1998; Label: RCA; Formats: 2×CD	—	—	—	—	—	—	—	—	—	
The Greatest Hits	Released: February 2000; Label: Camden/BMG; Formats: CD	—	—	—	—	—	—	—	—	—	UK: Gold
Ballroom Hitz	Released: June 2001; Label: BMG; Formats: 2×CD	—	—	—	—	—	—	—	—	—	
The Very Best of Sweet	Released: February 2005; Label: Sony BMG; Formats: CD	72	—	—	—	—	—	—	—	—	
Action: The Sweet Anthology	Released: 28 April 2009; Label: Shout! Factory; Formats: 2×CD	—	—	—	—	—	—	—	—	—	
Action: The Ultimate Story	Released: 18 September 2015; Label: RCA/Sony Music; Formats: 2×CD, digital download	—	—	—	—	—	17	—	—	—	
The Lost Singles	Released: 25 May 2018; Label: Sony Music; Formats: CD, digital download	—	—	—	—	—	50	—	—	—	
The Ultimate Collection	Released: 25 September 2020; Label: BMG; Formats: 3×CD, digital download	49	—	—	—	—	—	—	—	—	
Greatest Hitz 1969–1978	Released: 7 October 2022; Label: BMG; Formats: 3×CD, 2×LP	—	—	—	—	—	53	—	—	—	
"—" denotes releases that did not chart or were not released in that territory.

=== Box sets ===
Title	Album details	Peak chart positions
Title	Album details	GER
Finale 1985–2015	Released: 2015; Label: Angel Air; Formats: 4×CD	—
Are You Ready? – The RCA Era	Released: 14 April 2017; Label: RCA/Sony Music; Formats: 7×LP	61
Sensational Sweet Chapter One: The Wild Bunch	Released: 10 November 2017; Label: RCA/Sony Music; Formats: 9×CD	28
The Polydor Albums	Released: 1 December 2017; Label: Caroline; Formats: 4×CD	—
"—" denotes releases that did not chart or were not released in that territory.

== Singles ==
Title	Year	Peak chart positions										Certifications	Album
Title	Year	UK	AUS	AUT	CAN	GER	IRE	NL	NOR	SWE	US	Certifications	Album
"Slow Motion"	1968	—	—	—	—	—	—	—	—	—	—		Non-album singles
"The Lollipop Man"	1969	—	—	—	—	—	—	—	—	—	—		Non-album singles
"All You'll Ever Get from Me"	1970	—	—	—	—	—	—	—	—	—	—		Non-album singles
"Get on the Line"	1970	—	—	—	—	—	—	—	—	—	—		Non-album singles
"Funny, Funny"	1971	13	93	—	—	5	7	1	2	1	—		Funny How Sweet Co-Co Can Be
"Co-Co"	1971	2	42	—	—	1	3	3	2	2	99		Funny How Sweet Co-Co Can Be
"Alexander Graham Bell"	1971	33	—	—	—	24	—	— (Note: "Alexander Graham Bell" didn't enter the Dutch Single Top 30, but did peak at number 38 on the Dutch Top 40.)	—	—	—		Non-album singles
"Poppa Joe"	1972	11	70	—	—	3	16	1	2	2	—		Non-album singles
"Little Willy"	1972	4	65	—	1	1	9	6	7	—	3	US: Gold	Non-album singles
"Wig-Wam Bam"	1972	4	15	5	—	1	4	6	6	18	—		Non-album singles
"Block Buster!"	1973	1	29	1	30	1	1	1	3	—	73		Non-album singles
"I'm on My Way" (Note: Re-release from 1968. Only released as a single in Belgium, France and Switzerland.)	1973	—	—	—	—	—	—	—	—	—	—		Non-album singles
"Hell Raiser"	1973	2	49	4	—	1	2	4	5	—	—		Non-album singles
"It's Lonely Out There" (Note: Originally the B-side of 'Slow Motion'. Only released as a single in the US.)	1973	—	—	—	—	—	—	—	—	—	—		Non-album singles
"The Ballroom Blitz"	1973	2	1	5	1	1	1	2	2	3	5	CAN: Gold; UK: Gold	Non-album singles
"Teenage Rampage"	1974	2	10	16	—	1	1	11	2	7	—	UK: Silver	Non-album singles
"The Six Teens"	1974	9	48	9	—	4	15	10	7	11	—		Desolation Boulevard
"Turn It Down"	1974	41	—	14	—	4	—	—	4	10	—		Desolation Boulevard
"Peppermint Twist" (Note: Only released as a single in Australia, New Zealand and Japan.)	1974	—	4	—	—	—	—	—	—	—	—		Sweet Fanny Adams
"Fox on the Run"	1975	2	1	3	2	1	2	2	2	6	5	CAN: Gold; US: Gold	Desolation Boulevard
"Action"	1975	15	4	3	5	2	7	5	2	2	20		Give Us a Wink
"The Lies in Your Eyes"	1976	35	14	17	—	5	—	9	—	6	—		Give Us a Wink
"4th of July" (Note: Only released as a single in Australia.)	1976	—	—	—	—	—	—	—	—	—	—		Give Us a Wink
"Lost Angels"	1976	—	74	11	—	13	—	—	—	5	—		Off the Record
"Fever of Love"	1977	—	—	12	—	9	—	—	—	7	—		Off the Record
"Stairway to the Stars"	1977	—	—	—	—	15	—	—	—	—	—		Off the Record
"Funk It Up (David's Song)" (Note: Only released as a single in the US, Canada and Mexico.)	1977	—	—	—	87	—	—	—	—	—	88		Off the Record
"Love Is Like Oxygen"	1978	9	9	23	8	10	8	20	—	—	8	UK: Silver	Level Headed
"California Nights" (Note: Was scheduled for release in the UK but withdrawn. However, it was released as a single in Europe and North America.)	1978	—	—	—	86	23	—	—	—	—	76		Level Headed
"Call Me"	1979	—	—	—	—	29	—	—	—	—	—		Cut Above the Rest
"Mother Earth" (Note: Only released as a single in the US and Canada.)	1979	—	—	—	—	—	—	—	—	—	—		Cut Above the Rest
"Big Apple Waltz"	1979	—	—	—	—	—	—	—	—	—	—		Cut Above the Rest
"Give the Lady Some Respect"	1980	—	—	—	—	—	—	—	—	—	—		Waters Edge
"Sixties Man"	1980	—	—	—	—	—	—	—	—	—	—		Waters Edge
"Falling in Love" (Note: Only released as a single in Germany.)	1982	—	—	—	—	—	—	—	—	—	—		Identity Crisis
"It's It's... The Sweet Mix"	1984	45	36	—	—	—	—	—	—	—	—		Non-album singles
"Sweet 2th – The Wigwam Willy Mix"	1985	85	—	—	—	—	—	—	—	—	—		Non-album singles
"Love Is Like Oxygen" (live) / "Reach Out... I'll Be There"	1989	—	—	—	—	—	—	—	—	—	—		Live at the Marquee
"X-Ray Specs" (by Andy Scott's Sweet)	1991	—	—	—	—	—	—	—	—	—	—		Non-album single
"Stand Up" (by Andy Scott's Sweet)	1992	—	—	—	—	—	—	—	—	—	—		A
"Am I Ever Gonna See Your Face Again" (by Andy Scott's Sweet)	1992	—	—	—	—	—	—	—	—	—	—		A
"Fox on the Run" (Sweet & Foxy '98)	1998	—	—	—	—	—	—	—	—	—	—		Originals – The Best 37 Glamrock Songs Ever
"Do It All Over Again" (by Andy Scott's Sweet)	2002	—	—	—	—	—	—	—	—	—	—		Sweetlife
"I Saw Her Standing There" (by Steve Priest's Sweet)	2010	—	—	—	—	—	—	—	—	—	—		Non-album single
"Defender" (by Andy Scott's Sweet)	2015	—	—	—	—	—	—	—	—	—	—		Action – The Ultimate Story
"Still Got the Rock" (by Andy Scott's Sweet)	2015	—	—	—	—	—	—	—	—	—	—		Action – The Ultimate Story
"Everything" 2021 (by Andy Scott's Sweet)	2021	—	—	—	—	—	—	—	—	—	—		Non-album singles
"Let It Snow" (by Andy Scott's Sweet)	2021	—	—	—	—	—	—	—	—	—	—		Non-album singles
"Defender" 2022 (by Andy Scott's Sweet)	2022	—	—	—	—	—	—	—	—	—	—		Non-album singles
"Don't Bring Me Water" (by Andy Scott's Sweet)	2023	—	—	—	—	—	—	—	—	—	—		Full Circle
"Changes" (by Andy Scott's Sweet)	2023	—	—	—	—	—	—	—	—	—	—		Full Circle
"Burning Like a Falling Star" (by Andy Scott's Sweet)	2024	—	—	—	—	—	—	—	—	—	—		Full Circle
"Destination Hannover" (by Andy Scott's Sweet)	2024	—	—	—	—	—	—	—	—	—	—		Full Circle
"—" denotes releases that did not chart or were not released in that territory.

== Videos ==
=== Video albums ===
Title	Album details
Ballroom Blitz	Released: 1989; Label: CMV; Formats: VHS
Live at the Marquee	Released: 1989; Label: Sound & Vision; Formats: VHS
Gold	Released: 1993; Label: BMG Video; Formats: VHS
Six of the Best Part One	Released: 2000; Label: Self-released; Formats: DVD
Six of the Best Part Two	Released: 2000; Label: Self-released; Formats: DVD
Here and Now	Released: August 2003; Label: Self-released; Formats: DVD
Sweetlike – Most Famous Hits	Released: 2003; Label: Planet Song; Formats: DVD
The Very Best Of	Released: 2003; Label: Umbrella Music/Wienerworld; Formats: DVD
Glitz, Blitz, & Hitz	Released: February 2004; Label: Wienerworld, Creem; Formats: DVD
Block Buster	Released: November 2006; Label: All Stars; Formats: DVD
The Definitive Collection	Released: March 2007; Label: Self-released; Formats: DVD
Action – The Ultimate Story	Released: 18 September 2015; Label: Sony Music; Formats: 3xDVD
Finale – Live in Berlin 2015	Released: 18 December 2015; Label: Stuff Music; Formats: DVD

=== Music videos ===
Year	Title	Album
1971	"Funny Funny"	Funny How Sweet Co-Co Can Be
1971	"Co-Co"	Funny How Sweet Co-Co Can Be
1971	"Jeanie"	Funny How Sweet Co-Co Can Be
1971	"Alexander Graham Bell"	non-album
1972	"Poppa Joe"	non-album
1973	"The Ballroom Blitz"	non-album
1974	"Teenage Rampage"	non-album
1974	"The Six Teens"	Desolation Boulevard
1974	"Turn It Down"	Desolation Boulevard
1975	"Fox on the Run"	Desolation Boulevard
1975	"Action"	Give Us a Wink
1976	"The Lies in Your Eyes"	Give Us a Wink
1976	"Lost Angels"	Off the Record
1977	"Fever of Love"	Off the Record
1978	"Love Is Like Oxygen"	Level Headed
1978	"California Nights"	Level Headed
1978	"Fountain"	Level Headed
1978	"Lettres d'Amour"	Level Headed
1980	"Give the Lady Some Respect"	Waters Edge
1980	"Sixties Man"	Waters Edge
2002	"Sweetlife" (by Andy Scott's Sweet)	Sweetlife
2002	"Do It All Over Again" (by Andy Scott's Sweet)	Sweetlife
2002	"You're Crazy" (by Andy Scott's Sweet)	Sweetlife
2002	"Never Say Forever" (by Andy Scott's Sweet)	Sweetlife
2002	"Airheads!" (by Andy Scott's Sweet)	Sweetlife
2015	"Still Got the Rock" (by Andy Scott's Sweet)	Action – The Ultimate Story
2021	"Set Me Free" (by Andy Scott's Sweet)	Isolation Boulevard
2021	"Stand Up" (by Andy Scott's Sweet)	A
2021	"Everything" 2021 (by Andy Scott's Sweet)	Sweetlife
2022	"Defender" 2022 (by Andy Scott's Sweet)	non-album
2023	"Don't Bring Me Water" (by Andy Scott's Sweet)	non-album
2023	"Changes" (by Andy Scott's Sweet)	non-album
2024	"Burning Like a Falling Star" (by Andy Scott's Sweet)	Full Circle
2024	"Destination Hannover" (by Andy Scott's Sweet)	Full Circle
