= List of the Sweet band members =

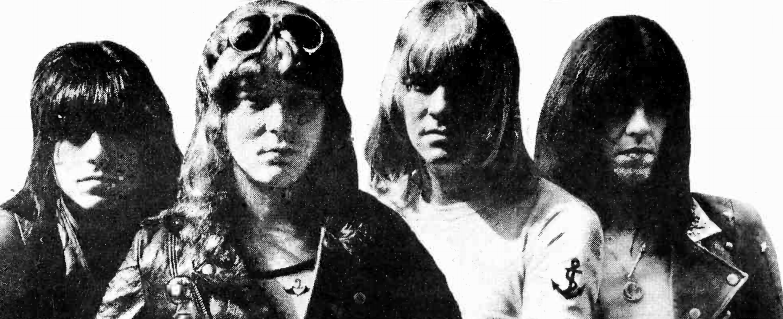
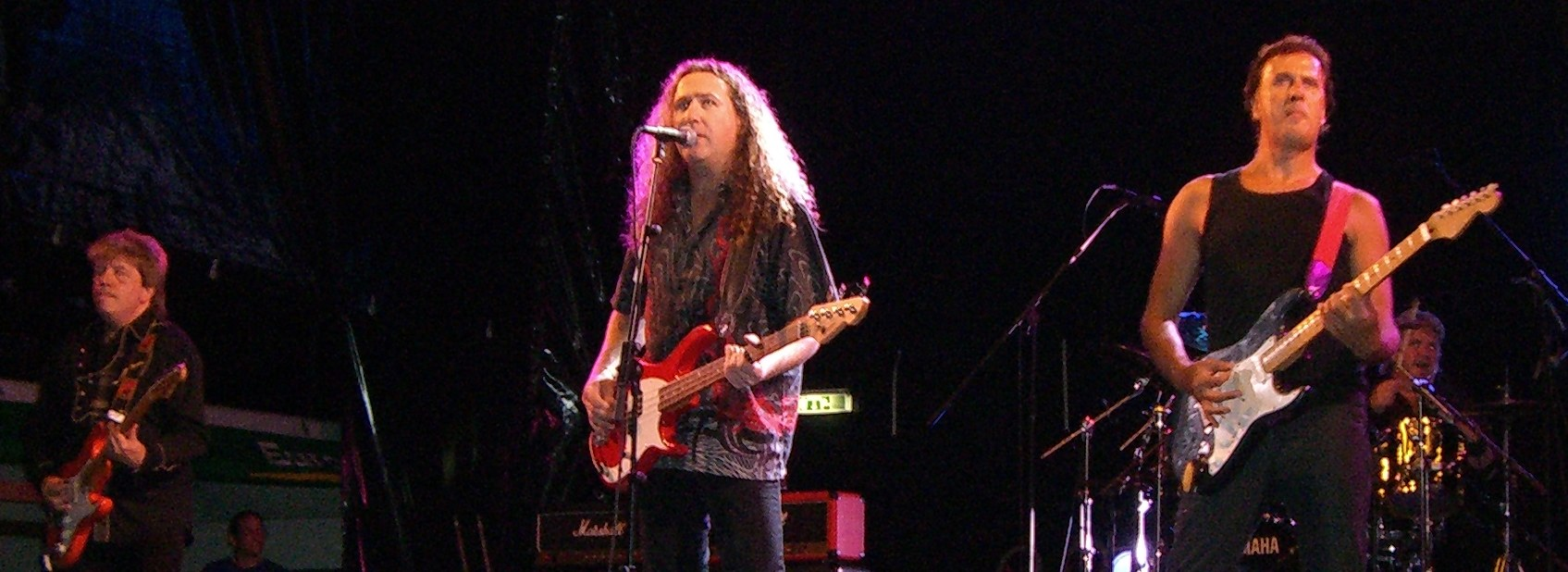
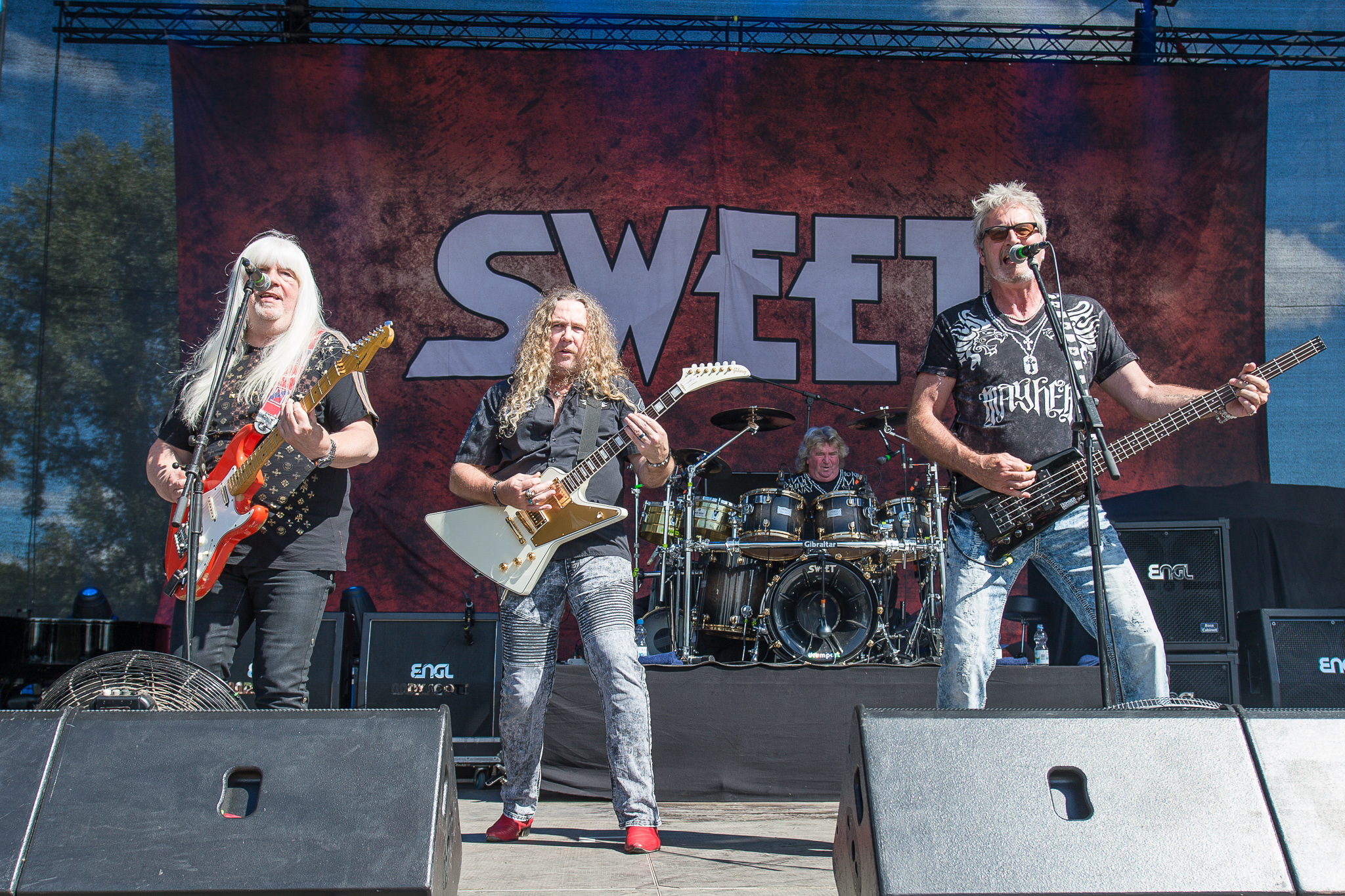
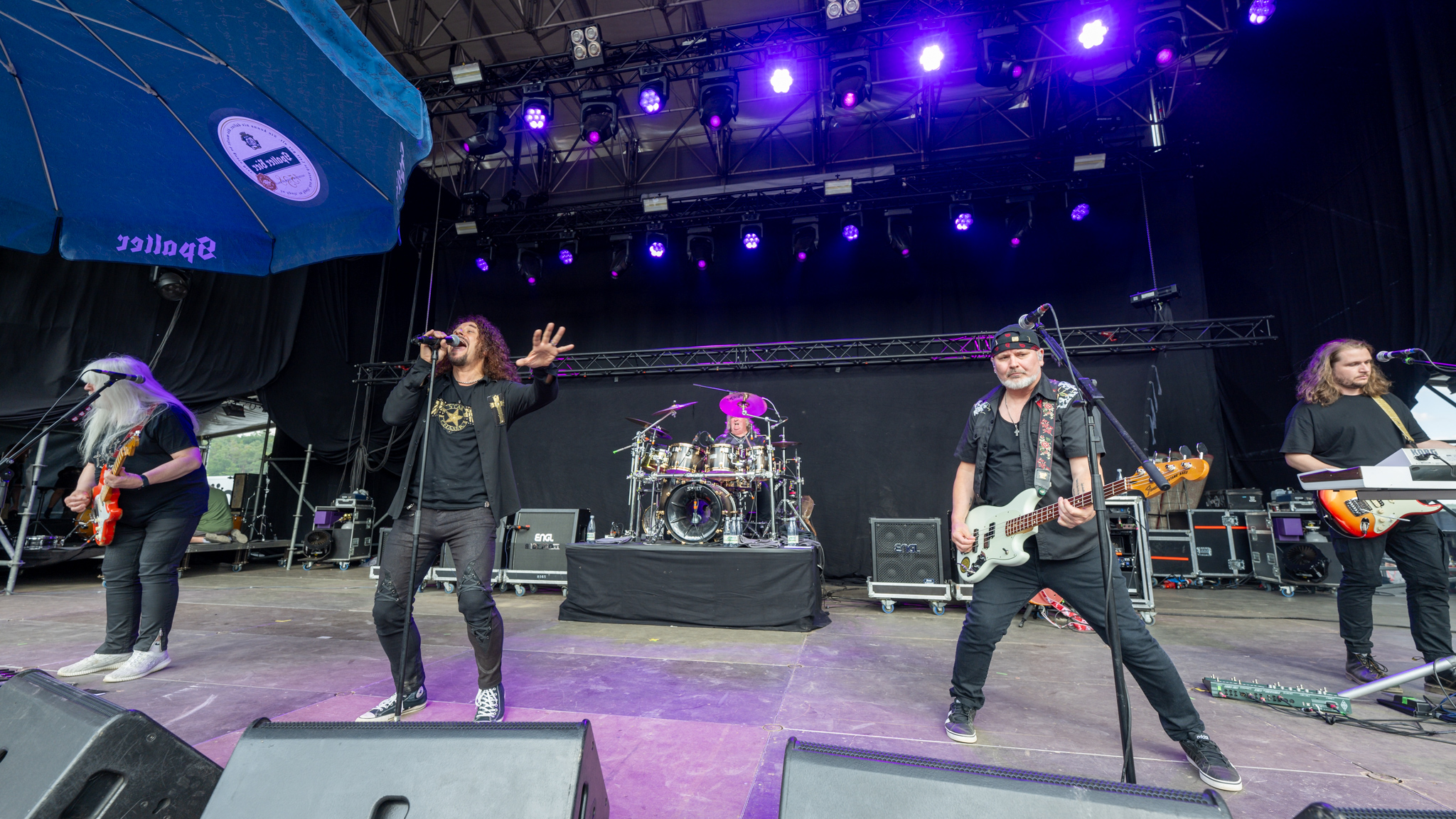
Sweet in 1975, 2006, 2017 and 2023

Sweet are a British glam rock band founded in 1968. Their best-known line-up included lead vocalist Brian Connolly, bassist Steve Priest, guitarist Andy Scott, and drummer Mick Tucker. Currently, one version of the band is led by Scott and included Tucker between 1985 and 1991, while the other was led by Priest until his death in 2020 and is still touring. Connolly also led a version of the band from 1984 until his death in 1997.

Scott's version includes lead vocalist Paul Manzi, bassist Lee Small, keyboardist/guitarist Tom Cory (all who joined in 2019) and drummer Adam Booth (since 2024). The final lineup of Priest's version, which ended with his death in 2020, included drummer Richie Onori and keyboardist Steve Stewart (both from 2008), guitarist Mitch Perry (from 2014) and vocalist Paulie Z (from 2017).

== History ==
In January 1968, Brian Connolly and Mick Tucker formed a band called The Sweetshop. They recruited bass guitarist and vocalist Steve Priest from a local band called The Army. Frank Torpey was recruited to play guitar. After releasing a few singles that failed to chart, the band were released from their recording contract and Frank Torpey left after a further year of fruitless toil. Guitarist Mick Stewart joined in 1969, although he was soon replaced by Andy Scott in September 1970.

In 1978, guitarist Nico Ramsden and keyboardist Gary Moberley joined the touring line-up. Connolly departed the band in 1979 after his alcoholism affected his live performances. In his absence, Priest and Scott shared lead vocals. Ray McRiner also replaced Ramsden. The band disbanded in 1981.

In 1985, Scott and Tucker organised their own version of Sweet with Paul Mario Day (previously played with Iron Maiden, More, and Wildfire) on lead vocals, Phil Lanzon of the band Grand Prix on keyboards, and Mal McNulty on bass. Day departed in 1989, McNulty moved onto lead vocals, and Jeff Brown joined on bass. Lanzon joined the band Uriah Heep in 1986, though he continued with The Sweet until 1988. Malcolm Pearson and Ian Gibbons filled in for Lanzon until Steve Mann arrived in December 1989.

Tucker departed after a show in Lochau, Austria, on 5 May 1991. Three drummers, Andy Hoyler, Bobby Andersen, and Bruce Bisland, provided short-term relief before Bodo Schopf took over. in 1992, Bodo left, and Bisland returned as a permanent drummer. McNulty departed in 1994, though he would briefly return that year to fill in for Jeff Brown on bass. In 1995, he similarly rejoined the band as lead singer while Rocky Newton substituted on bass). Chris Goulstone and Sweet's former keyboard players Gary Moberley and Ian Gibbons also filled-in for other players during 1995. Chad Brown of the band Lionheart was chosen as the new front man.

In 1996, Mann left to take a job in television and Gibbons came back for a short time before Steve Grant of the band The Animals became the permanent keyboardist. When Chad Brown quit in 1998 after developing a throat infection, Jeff Brown assumed lead vocals and bass duties. In 2003, Tony O'Hora (previously played with Onslaught and Praying Mantis) replaced Brown as lead vocalist and bassist. O'Hora briefly left and was replaced for some gigs by singer Mark Thompson Smith and bassist Jo Burt. Grant also handled lead vocals and bass briefly with Phil Lanzon returning on keyboards in his place. In 2006, Shy singer Tony Mills was briefly slated to be the Sweet's new singer/bassist but he departed after six shows in Denmark.

O'Hora returned in 2006 but had departed by the end of the year. Pete Lincoln subsequently joined as new singer/bassist. This line-up stayed constant until 2010 when Scott missed some shows due to health issues, he was temporarily replaced by Martin Mickels. Steve Grant departed in 2011, and O'Hora returned in this place. This line-up stayed the same until 2019, save for when Lincoln had to miss some shows in 2014 and 2015. In this case O'Hora moved back to lead vocals and bass and Paul Manzi played keyboards and guitar.

Pete Lincoln left in 2019 and was quickly replaced by O'Hora on bass and Manzi on keyboards and guitar, before O'Hora departed and Manzi did vocals/bass. Steve Mann returned on keyboards and guitar as a guest member, Tom Cory also handled keyboards and guitar and soon became permanent. Lee Small became new bassist and backing vocalist in 2019, with Manzi focusing on lead vocals only. In 2024, Bruce Bisland was replaced by tech Adam Booth, who had previously played drums in 2015 and bass in 2019. In 2025 FM guitarist Jim Kirkpatrick toured with The Sweet as backup guitarist for Scott.

== Original band ==
=== Classic line-up ===
Image	Name	Years active	Instruments	Release contributions
	Steve Priest	1968–1982 (died 2020)	bass; lead and backing vocals; harmonica; cello (1975); synthesizer (1977)	all releases
	Mick Tucker	1968–1982 (died 2002)	drums; backing vocals; occasional lead vocals (1979–1982)	all releases
	Brian Connolly	1968–1979 (died 1997)	lead and backing vocals; occasional percussion, acoustic guitar and synthesizer	all releases from Slow Motion (1968) to Level Headed (1978); Rock & Roll Disgrace – Live in Japan (1992); Blockbuster – Live on Stage (1993); Live in Denmark 1976 (1998); Live at the Rainbow 1973 (1999)
	Andy Scott	1970–1982	guitar; backing and lead vocals; keyboards (1974–1982)	all releases from Funny How Sweet Co-Co Can Be (1971) onwards

=== Early members ===
Image	Name	Years active	Instruments	Release contributions
	Frank Torpey	1968–1969 (died 2024)	guitar	"Slow Motion" (1968)
	Mick Stewart	1969–1970	guitar	"The Lollipop Man" (1969); "All You'll Ever Get from Me" (1970); "Get on the Line" (1970)

=== Touring musicians ===
Image	Name	Years active	Instruments	Release contributions
	Gary Moberley	1978–1981	keyboards	Cut Above the Rest • Water's Edge
	Nico Ramsden	1978	guitar	none
	Ray McRiner	1979	guitar	none

=== Lineups ===
Period	Members	Releases
January 1968 – mid 1969	Brian Connolly – lead vocals; Frank Torpey – guitar; Steve Priest – bass, backing vocals; Mick Tucker – drums, backing vocals	"Slow Motion" (1968)
Mid 1969 – Mid 1970	Brian Connolly – lead vocals; Mick Stewart – guitar; Steve Priest – bass, backing vocals; Mick Tucker – drums, backing vocals	"The Lollipop Man" (1969); "All You'll Ever Get from Me" (1970); "Get on the Line" (1970)
Mid 1970 – February 1979	Brian Connolly – lead and backing vocals; Andy Scott – guitars, backing and lead vocals, keyboards; Steve Priest – bass, backing and lead vocals; Mick Tucker – drums, backing vocals	Funny How Sweet Co-Co Can Be (1971); Sweet Fanny Adams (1974); Desolation Boulevard (1974); Give Us a Wink (1976); Off the Record (1977); Level Headed (1978); Rock & Roll Disgrace – Live in Japan (1992); Blockbuster – Live on Stage (1993); Live in Denmark 1976 (1998); Live at the Rainbow 1973 (1999)
February 1979 – late 1981	Steve Priest – lead and backing vocals, bass; Andy Scott – guitar, keyboards, lead and backing vocals; Mick Tucker – drums, backing and occasional lead vocals	Cut Above the Rest (1979); Waters Edge (1980); Identity Crisis (1982)

== Andy Scott's Sweet ==
=== Current members ===
Image	Name	Years active	Instruments	Release contributions
	Andy Scott	1985–present	guitar; backing vocals; keyboards (1989–2005, 2006–present); occasional lead vocals (1998–2019)	all releases
	Paul Manzi	2019–present (substitute appearances in 2014, 2015 and 2019)	lead vocals; bass and backing vocals (2014, 2015, 2019); keyboards, guitar, backing and lead vocals (2014)	Isolation Boulevard (2020)
	Lee Small	2019–present	bass; backing vocals	Isolation Boulevard (2020)
	Tom TC Cory	2019–present	keyboards; guitar; backing vocals; engineering	Isolation Boulevard (2020)
	Adam Booth	2024–present (substitute 2015 and 2019)	drums; backing vocals; bass (2019)	Full Circle (2024) one track
	Jim Kirkpatrick	2025–present (backup for Scott)	guitar, backing vocals	none

=== Former members ===
Image	Name	Years active	Instruments	Release contributions
	Mal McNulty	1985–1994 (substitute 1994, 1995)	bass and backing vocals (1985–1989, 1994); lead vocals (1989–1994, 1995)	Live at the Marquee (1989); Greatest Hits - Live (1994); A (1992); The Answer (1995)
	Mick Tucker	1985–1991 (died 2002)	drums; backing vocals	Live at the Marquee (1989); Greatest Hits - Live (1994)
	Phil Lanzon	1985–1989; 2005	keyboards; backing vocals	Live at the Marquee (1989); Greatest Hits - Live (1994)
	Paul Mario Day	1985–1989 (died 2025)	lead vocals	Live at the Marquee (1989); Greatest Hits - Live (1994)
	Jeff Brown	1989–2003	bass; vocals (lead 1998–2003, backing 1989–1998)	A (1992); The Answer (1995); Glitz, Blitz & Hitz (1996)
	Steve Mann	1989–1996 (substitute in 2006, 2019–2022)	keyboards; guitar; backing vocals	A (1992); The Answer (1995); Isolation Boulevard (2020)
	Bruce Bisland	1992–2024 (substitute 1991)	drums; backing vocals; occasional lead vocals (2011–2019)	all releases from The Answer (1995) onwards
	Bodo Schopf	1991–1992	drums; backing vocals	A (1992)
	Chad Brown	1995–1998	lead vocals	Glitz, Blitz & Hitz (1996)
	Steve Grant	1996–2011	keyboards, guitar and backing vocals (1996–2005, 2006–2011); lead vocals (2005–2006, occasionally 2006–2011); bass (2005–2006)	Glitz, Blitz & Hitz (1996); Sweetlife (2002)
	Tony O'Hora	2003–2005; 2006; 2011–2019	lead vocals (2003–2005, 2006, 2015, occasionally 2011–2019); bass (2003–2005, 2006, 2015); keyboards, guitars and backing vocals (2011–2019)	New York Connection (2012); Desolation Boulevard Revisited (2012); Sweet Fanny Adams Revisited (2013)
	Peter Lincoln	2006–2019	lead and backing vocals; bass	New York Connection (2012); Desolation Boulevard Revisited (2012); Sweet Fanny Adams Revisited (2013)

=== Temporary musicians ===
Image	Name	Years active	Instruments	Notes
	Malcolm Pearson	1988	keyboards	Pearson filled in for Lanzon until Steve Mann joined in December 1989.
	Ian Gibbons	1989; 1994; 1996; 2005 (died 2019)	keyboards	Gibbons filled in on keyboards several times, first in 1989 for Phil Lanzon, for Steve Mann in 1994 and 1996 and after Mann's departure and in 2005.
	Andy Hoyler	1991	drums	Hoyler, Andersen and Bruce Bisland provided short-term relief for Mick Tucker before Bodo Schopf took over.
	Bobby Andersen	1991	drums	Hoyler, Andersen and Bruce Bisland provided short-term relief for Mick Tucker before Bodo Schopf took over.
	Gary Moberley	1994	keyboards	Moberley, Gibbons and Goulstone subbed in 1994.
	Chris Goulstone	1994	keyboards	Moberley, Gibbons and Goulstone subbed in 1994.
	Rocky Newton	1995	bass	Newton subbed on bass 1995 alongside the returning Mal McNulty on lead vocals.
	Jo Burt	2005	bass	Thompson Smith and Burt performed with the band after O'Hora's first departure in November 2005 for some Swedish gigs.
	Mark Thompson Smith	2005	lead vocals	Thompson Smith and Burt performed with the band after O'Hora's first departure in November 2005 for some Swedish gigs.
	Tony Mills	2006 (died 2019)	lead vocals; bass	Mills was slated to be Sweet's new singer/bassist in early 2006 but it failed to work out and he left after six shows in Denmark.
	Martin Mickels	2010	guitar	Mickels subbed for Scott himself in March and April 2010 when he was absent from a couple of gigs due to ill health.
	Randall Waller	2024	guitar	Waller subbed for Scott during an Australian Tour in 2024.

=== Line-ups ===
Period	Members	Releases
Early 1985 – July 1989	Paul Mario Day – lead vocals; Andy Scott – guitar, backing vocals; Mal McNulty – bass, backing vocals; Phil Lanzon – keyboards, backing vocals; Mick Tucker – drums, backing vocals	Live at the Marquee (1989); Greatest Hits - Live (1994)
July 1989 – November 1990	Andy Scott – guitar, backing vocals; Mal McNulty – lead vocals; Phil Lanzon – keyboards, backing vocals; Mick Tucker – drums, backing vocals; Jeff Brown – bass, backing vocals	
November 1990 – 1991	Andy Scott – guitar, keyboards, backing vocals; Mal McNulty – lead vocals; Mick Tucker – drums, backing vocals; Jeff Brown – bass, backing vocals; Steve Mann – keyboards, guitar, backing vocals	
1991 – early 1992	Andy Scott – guitar, keyboards, backing vocals; Mal McNulty – lead vocals; Jeff Brown – bass, backing vocals; Steve Mann – keyboards, guitars, backing vocals; Bodo Schopf – drums, backing vocals	A (1992) (Re-released in 1995 as The Answer)
1992–1995	Andy Scott – guitar, keyboards, backing vocals; Mal McNulty – lead vocals; Jeff Brown – bass, backing vocals; Steve Mann – keyboards, guitars, backing vocals; Bruce Bisland – drums, backing vocals	none
1995 – January 1996	Andy Scott – guitars, keyboards, backing vocals; Jeff Brown – bass, backing vocals; Steve Mann – keyboards, guitars, backing vocals; Bruce Bisland – drums, backing vocals; Chad Brown – lead vocals	none
January 1996 – early 1998	Andy Scott – guitar, keyboards backing vocals; Jeff Brown – bass, backing vocals; Bruce Bisland – drums, backing vocals; Steve Grant – keyboards, guitars, backing vocals; Chad Brown – lead vocals	Glitz, Blitz & Hitz (1996)
Early 1998 – early 2003	Andy Scott – guitars, keyboards, backing and lead vocals; Jeff Brown – lead and backing vocals, bass; Bruce Bisland – drums, backing vocals; Steve Grant – keyboards, guitars, backing vocals	Sweetlife (2002)
2003–2005	Andy Scott – guitars, keyboards, backing and lead vocals; Bruce Bisland – drums, backing vocals; Steve Grant – keyboards, guitars, backing vocals; Tony O'Hora – lead and backing vocals, bass	none
2005 – January 2006	Andy Scott – guitars, backing and lead vocals; Bruce Bisland – drums, backing vocals; Steve Grant – lead and backing vocals, bass; Phil Lanzon – keyboards, backing vocals	none
January–August 2006	Andy Scott – guitars, keyboards, backing and lead vocals; Bruce Bisland – drums, backing vocals; Steve Grant – keyboards, guitars, backing and occasional lead vocals; Tony O'Hora – lead vocals and backing vocals, bass	none
August 2006 – early 2011	Andy Scott – guitars, keyboards, backing and lead vocals; Bruce Bisland – drums, backing vocals; Steve Grant – keyboards, guitars, backing and occasional lead vocals; Peter Lincoln – lead and backing vocals, bass	none
Early 2011 – June 2019	Andy Scott – guitars, keyboards, backing and lead vocals; Bruce Bisland – drums, backing and occasional lead vocals; Peter Lincoln – lead and backing vocals, bass; Tony O'Hora – keyboards, guitars, backing and lead vocals	New York Connection (2012); Desolation Boulevard Revisited (2012); Sweet Fanny Adams Revisited (2013)
June–October 2019	Andy Scott – guitars, keyboards, backing and lead vocals; Bruce Bisland – drums, backing and occasional lead vocals; Tony O'Hora – keyboards, guitars, backing and lead vocals; Paul Manzi – lead and backing vocals, bass	none
October 2019 – July 2024	Andy Scott – guitars, keyboards, backing vocals; Bruce Bisland – drums, backing vocals; Paul Manzi – lead vocals; Lee Small – bass, backing vocals; Tom Cory – keyboards, guitars, backing vocals	Isolation Boulevard (2020); Full Circle (2024)
July 2024 – present	Andy Scott – guitars, keyboards, backing and occasional lead vocals; Paul Manzi – lead vocals; Lee Small – bass, backing vocals; Tom Cory – keyboards, guitars, backing vocals; Adam Booth – drums, backing vocals	Full Circle (2024) one track

== Brian Connolly's Sweet ==
Image	Name	Years active	Instruments
	Brian Connolly	1984–1997 (until his death)	lead vocals
	Phil Ridden	1984–1986; 1993	drums
	Brian Rawson	1984	guitar
	Geoff Roots	1984	bass
	Gary Farmer	1984–1990; 1990–1993	bass
	Steve Turner	1984–1990; 1990–1993	guitar
	Michael Williams	1984–1990; 1990–1992	guitar
	Steve Berry	1990	bass
	Neale Haywood	1990	guitar
	Martin Saunders	1990	drums
	Dave Farmer	1990–1993; 1994–1996	drums
	Steve Mulvey	1993–1997	keyboards
	Bjorn Hurrel	1993–1994	bass
	Mel Johnson	1993–1994	guitar
	Glenn Williams	1994–1997	guitar
	Drew Murphy	1994–1995	drums
	Martin Cook	1994–1995	bass
	Dave Glover	1995–1997	bass
	Russ Mahoney	1995–1996	drums
	Jeff King	1996–1997	drums

=== Line-ups ===
1984 The New Sweet	1984–1990	1990	1990–1992
Brian Connolly – lead vocals; Brian Rawson – guitar; Phil Ridden – drums, percussion; Geoff Roots – bass	Brian Connolly – lead vocals; Phil Ridden – drums, percussion; Gary Farmer – bass; Steve Turner – guitar; Michael Williams – guitar	Brian Connolly – lead vocals; Steve Berry – bass; Neale Haywood – guitar; Martin Saunders – drums	Brian Connolly – lead vocals; Dave Farmer – drums, percussion; Gary Farmer – bass; Steve Turner – guitar; Michael Williams – guitar
1992–1993	1993–1994 Brian Connolly's Sweet	1994–1995	1995–1996
Brian Connolly – lead vocals; Dave Farmer – drums, percussion; Gary Farmer – bass; Steve Turner – guitar	Brian Connolly – lead vocals; Bjorn Hurrel – bass; Mel Johnson – guitar; Steve Mulvey – keyboards; Phil Ridden – drums, percussion	Brian Connolly – lead vocals; Steve Mulvey – keyboards; Martin Cook – bass; Dave Farmer – drums, percussion; Drew Murphy – drums, percussion; Glenn Williams – guitar	Brian Connolly – lead vocals; Steve Mulvey – keyboards; Dave Farmer – drums, percussion; Glenn Williams – guitar; Dave Glover – bass; Russ Mahoney – drums, percussion
1996–1997
Brian Connolly – lead vocals; Steve Mulvey – keyboards; Glenn Williams – guitar; Dave Glover – bass; Jeff King – drums, percussion

== Steve Priest's Sweet ==
Image	Name	Years active	Instruments
	Steve Priest	2008–2020 (until his death)	bass; vocals
	Richie Onori	2008–2020	drums
	Stevie Stewart	2008–2020	keyboards; vocals
	Joe Retta	2008–2013; 2013–2017	vocals
	Stuart Smith	2008–2012	guitar
	Ricky Z.	2012–2013	guitar
	Chas West	2013 (substitute)	vocals
	Mitch Perry	2014–2020	guitar; backing vocals
	Paulie Z.	2017–2020	vocals
