= The Golden Greats =

Compilation album by Sweet
- Released: October 1977
- Genres: Glam rock; hard rock
- Length: 43:22
- Label: RCA Records
- Producers: Sweet, Phil Wainman, Mike Chapman, Nicky Chinn

Sweet chronology
| Off the Record (1977) | The Golden Greats (1977) | Level Headed (1978) |

The Golden Greats is a greatest hits album by English glam rock band Sweet, released in 1977. Their second UK compilation album after The Sweet's Biggest Hits which featured their hits from 1971 to1972, this album features all of their UK singles from 1973 to 1977 although the last three, "Lost Angels", "Fever of Love" and "Stairway to the Stars" failed to chart in the UK or the US. They returned to the top ten in the UK and US the following year with their final hit single "Love Is Like Oxygen" from their sixth studio album Level Headed.

Professional ratings
Review scores
| Source | Rating |
|---|---|
| AllMusic | 3/5 stars |

== Track listing ==
Side one

1. "Block Buster!" – 3:12
2. "Hellraiser" – 3:15
3. "Ballroom Blitz" – 4:07
4. "Teenage Rampage" – 3:32
5. "The Six Teens" – 4:06
6. "Turn It Down" – 3:30
- Written by Nicky Chinn and Mike Chapman. Tracks 1–4 produced by Phil Wainman. Track 5 produced by Nicky Chinn, Mike Chapman and Phil Wainman. Track 6 produced by Nicky Chinn and Mike Chapman.

=== Side two ===
1. "Fox on the Run" – 3:24
2. "Action" – 3:44
3. "Lost Angels" – 4:02
4. "The Lies in Your Eyes" – 3:48
5. "Fever of Love" – 4:03
6. "Stairway to the Stars" – 3:05
- Written and produced by Sweet.
- The Golden Greats featured all the RCA singles from "Block Buster!" to "Stairway to the Stars" in chronological order except that "Lost Angels" was placed before "The Lies in Your Eyes" in the track listing either as a record company error or because it was assumed the playlist sounded better that way.
