= Live in Denmark 1976 =

- Original release album cover

Live album by Sweet
- Released: 1998
- Recorded: 7 May 1976
- Genre: Hard rock, glam rock
- Length: 72:49

Sweet chronology
| Platinum Rare (1995) | Live in Denmark 1976 (1998) | Live at the Rainbow 1973 (1999) |

Alternative cover
- 2010 reissue album cover

Professional ratings
Review scores
| Source | Rating |
|---|---|
| AllMusic | 3.5/5 stars |

Live in Denmark 1976 is a live album by the British glam rock band Sweet, released in 1998. The album is a recording of a concert at Fyens Forum, Odense on 7 May 1976. In 2010 the album was reissued as Live in Concert Denmark 1976 on the ZYX Music label.

== Track listing ==
All tracks are written by Brian Connolly, Steve Priest, Andy Scott and Mick Tucker, except where noted

| No. | Title | Writer(s) | Length |
|---|---|---|---|
| 1. | "Ballroom Blitz" | Nicky Chinn, Mike Chapman | 4:01 |
| 2. | "Yesterday's Rain" | | 5:02 |
| 3. | "Someone Else Will"/"Blockbuster" | Connolly, Priest, Scott, Tucker / Chinn, Chapman | 5:39 |
| 4. | "Restless" | | 4:24 |
| 5. | "Cockroach" | | 6:06 |
| 6. | "Burn on the Flame"/"Healer" | | 6:53 |
| 7. | "AC/DC" | Chinn, Chapman | 4:03 |
| 8. | "Keep It In" | | 2:32 |
| 9. | "Man with the Golden Arm" (Mick Tucker drum solo) | Elmer Bernstein, Sylvia Fine | 9:47 |
| 10. | "The Lies in Your Eyes" | | 3:24 |
| 11. | "The Six Teens" | Chinn, Chapman | 4:49 |
| 12. | "Turn It Down" | Chinn, Chapman | 3:33 |
| 13. | "Action" | | 4:03 |
| 14. | "Set Me Free" | Scott | 4:03 |
| 15. | "Fox on the Run" | | 4:04 |
| Total length: | | | 72:49 |
