= Strung Up (Sweet album) =

Compilation album by Sweet
- Released: November 1975
- Recorded: 1973–1975
- Genre: Glam rock; hard rock
- Length: 74:16
- Label: RCA
- Producer: Sweet

Sweet chronology
The Sweet Singles Album (1975)	Strung Up (1975)	Give Us a Wink (1976)

Professional ratings
Review scores
Source	Rating
AllMusic	4/5 stars

Strung Up is a double live/compilation album by English glam rock band Sweet released by RCA Records in 1975. The first disc contains seven songs recorded live during a concert at the Rainbow Theatre, London on 21 December 1973. The second one contains ten selections of their songs recorded since 1973, including three songs that have not been released previously on any album, ("Burn On the Flame" and "Miss Demeanour") but only one ("I Wanna Be Committed") is brand new. The album also includes a unique mix of "Action" that comes to an abrupt end, and does not include the final decaying echo of the shorter single and longer Give Us a Wink album versions.

Strung Up was not originally released in the United States. In Japan it was released by Capitol Records under the title Anthology. In Italy it was released as two separate albums - the studio set entitled Strung Up (released 1975) and the live set entitled Live In England (1976).

Until the 2016 rerelease, the album had been re-issued on CD only in the United States in 1997 on Chinebridge Records and in Japan (as Anthology). These releases include the standard album version of "Action". In 1999, RCA released a CD entitled Live at the Rainbow 1973 that contains the concert from the original album in its entire length. However this version is in mono, while the abbreviated version from Strung Up is in stereo.

In 2016, the CD release had all original tracks plus "Ballroom Blitz", "Teenage Rampage" and "Blockbuster" added to the live set and "The Lies in Your Eyes", "Fever of Love", "Teenage Rampage", "Hell Raiser" and an extended version of "I Wanna Be Committed" added to the studio set. The live tracks on this release are taken from the mono recording, and none of the stereo live mixes were used.

== Track listing ==
All tracks are written by Brian Connolly, Steve Priest, Andy Scott and Mick Tucker, except where noted.

Live album: Side one
No.	Title	Writer(s)	Length
1.	"Hellraiser"	Nicky Chinn, Mike Chapman	3:51
2.	"Burning"/"Someone Else Will"		5:41
3.	"Rock 'n' Roll Disgrace"		4:08
4.	"Need a Lot of Lovin'"		2:52
Total length:			16:32

Live album: Side two
No.	Title	Writer(s)	Length
5.	"Done Me Wrong Alright"		8:06
6.	"You're Not Wrong for Lovin' Me"		3:10
7.	"The Man with the Golden Arm"	Elmer Bernstein, Sylvia Fine	7:50
Total length:			19:06

Compilation album: Side one
No.	Title	Writer(s)	Length
1.	"Action"		3:35
2.	"Fox on the Run"		3:22
3.	"Set Me Free"	Scott	3:56
4.	"Miss Demeanour"		3:26
5.	"Ballroom Blitz"	Chinn, Chapman	4:00
Total length:			18:26

Compilation album: Side two
No.	Title	Writer(s)	Length
6.	"Burn on the Flame"		3:34
7.	"Solid Gold Brass"		5:27
8.	"The Six Teens"	Chinn, Chapman	3:58
9.	"I Wanna Be Committed"	Chinn, Chapman	4:01
10.	"Blockbuster"	Chinn, Chapman	3:12
Total length:			20:11
