= Time Remembered (album) =

Live album by Bill Evans
- Released: 1983
- Recorded: April 10, 1962 (#1–4); Plaza Sound Studio, New York City; December 15, 1958 (#5); Reeves Sound Studios, New York City; May 30, 1963 (#6–9); May 31, 1963 (#10–13); Shelly's Manne-Hole, Los Angeles
- Genre: Jazz
- Length: 70:46
- Label: Milestone; M 47068
- Producer: Orrin Keepnews

Bill Evans chronology
At Shelly's Manne-Hole (1963)	Time Remembered (1983)	Trio 64 (1964)

Time Remembered is a live album by jazz pianist Bill Evans with Chuck Israels and Larry Bunker partially recorded at Shelly Manne's club in Hollywood, California in May 1963, but not released until 1983 on the Milestone label as a 16-track double LP. It would be later reissued on CD in 1999, with only 13 tracks. The trio performances were recorded at the same sessions that produced At Shelly's Manne-Hole (1963) and were first released on Bill Evans: The Complete Riverside Recordings (1984). The four solo performances ("Danny Boy", "Like Someone in Love", "In Your Own Sweet Way" and "Easy to Love") were recorded in a separate session in April 1962 in New York City. "Some Other Time" was recorded in December 1958, in New York City.

== Reception ==
The Allmusic review by Scott Yanow awarded the album 4 stars and states "This is one of the finest recordings by this particular trio. Worth searching for".

Professional ratings
Review scores
Source	Rating
Allmusic	4/5 stars

== Track listing ==
The track listing differs between the original LP and the CD re-issue. This was an attempt to rationalise the Bill Evans catalogue; the LP version was essentially an expanded version of the At Shelly's Manne-Hole album with an additional 8 tracks. The 13 track 1999 CD version removes all the common tracks and adds the solo numbers recorded the month before plus Some Other Time. The CD reissue of At Shelly's Manne-Hole adds All the Things You Are, not featured on either original LP.

1983 LP Track Listing

Side 1:

1. "Who Cares?" (George Gershwin, Ira Gershwin) - 5:22
2. "In a Sentimental Mood" (Duke Ellington) - 4:23
3. "Everything Happens to Me" (Tom Adair, Matt Dennis) - 4:46
4. "What Is This Thing Called Love?" (Cole Porter) - 5:48 *

Side 2:

1. "Time Remembered" (Bill Evans) - 5:37
2. "My Heart Stood Still" (Richard Rodgers, Lorenz Hart) - 4:33
3. "Lover Man" (Jimmy Davis, Ram Ramirez, James Sherman) - 5:06 *
4. "Blues in F/Five" (Chuck Israels/Bill Evans) - 5:41 *

Side 3:

1. "Love Is Here to Stay" (George Gershwin, Ira Gershwin) - 4:48 *
2. "'Round Midnight" (Thelonious Monk, Cootie Williams) - 8:58 *
3. "Stella by Starlight" (Victor Young, Ned Washington) - 4:59 *
4. "How About You?" (Ralph Freed, Burton Lane) - 4:04 *

Side 4:

1. "Isn't It Romantic?" (Richard Rodgers, Lorenz Hart) - 4:39 *
2. "The Boy Next Door" (Hugh Martin, Ralph Blane) - 5:24 *
3. "Wonder Why" (Nicholas Brodzsky, Sammy Cahn) - 5:16
4. "Swedish Pastry" (Barney Kessel) - 5:48

*Indicates selections recorded on May 30, 1963, all others May 31.

1999 CD Track Listing

1. "Danny Boy" (Frederic Weatherly) - 10:41
2. "Like Someone in Love" (Johnny Burke, Jimmy Van Heusen) - 6:27
3. "In Your Own Sweet Way" (Dave Brubeck) - 2:58
4. "Easy to Love" (Cole Porter) - 4:42
5. "Some Other Time" (Leonard Bernstein, Betty Comden, Adolph Green) - 6:12
6. "Lover Man" (Jimmy Davis, Ram Ramirez, James Sherman) - 5:06
7. "Who Cares?" (George Gershwin, Ira Gershwin) - 5:24
8. "What Is This Thing Called Love?" (Cole Porter) - 5:48
9. "How About You?" (Ralph Freed, Burton Lane) - 4:06
10. "Everything Happens to Me" (Tom Adair, Matt Dennis) - 4:47
11. "In a Sentimental Mood" (Duke Ellington, Manny Kurtz, Irving Mills) - 4:26
12. "My Heart Stood Still" (Lorenz Hart, Richard Rodgers) - 4:34
13. "Time Remembered" (Bill Evans) - 5:35

== Personnel ==
- Bill Evans – piano
- Chuck Israels – bass
- Larry Bunker – drums
