= Ballroom Blitz (disambiguation) =

"The Ballroom Blitz" is a 1973 song by the Sweet.

Ballroom Blitz may also refer to:

- The Ballroom Blitz & More Sweet Hits, a 1992 album by Sweet
- Ballroom Blitz – Live at the Lyceum, a 1992 album by the Damned
- Ballroom Blitz Tour, a 2010 concert tour by Korn
- "Ballroom Blitz" (Roseanne), a 1996 television episode
