= Live in Denmark =

Live in Denmark may refer to:

- Live in Denmark (Disciple EP), 2016
- Live in Denmark 1972, a 2007 album by Deep Purple
- Live in Denmark 1976, a 1998 album by Sweet
