= The Ballroom Blitz & More Sweet Hits =

1992 rock album by Sweet

Greatest hits album by Sweet
- Released: 1992
- Recorded: 1971–1978
- Genre: Glam rock, hard rock, pop
- Length: 69:01
- Label: BMG Arista

Sweet chronology
| Identity Crisis (1982) | The Ballroom Blitz & More Sweet Hits (1992) | Platinum Rare (1995) |

Professional ratings
Review scores
| Source | Rating |
|---|---|
| Allmusic | 4/5 stars |

The Ballroom Blitz & More Sweet Hits is a greatest hits album from British rock band Sweet, initially released in Australia in 1992 on the BMG label. Upon its release it reached number 19 on the Australian albums chart. It was later released in the United States in 1998.

== Track listing ==
1. "The Ballroom Blitz" – 4:03
2. "Fox on the Run" – 3:22
3. "Wig Wam Bam" – 3:02
4. "Little Willy" – 3:14
5. "Co-Co" – 3:10
6. "Alexander Graham Bell" – 2:56
7. "Funny Funny" – 2:48
8. "The Six Teens" – 4:04
9. "The Lies in Your Eyes" – 3:43
10. "Poppa Joe" – 3:07
11. "Block Buster!" – 3:14
12. "Hell Raiser" – 3:20
13. "Teenage Rampage" – 3:35
14. "Action" – 3:19
15. "Peppermint Twist" – 3:26
16. "Stairway to the Stars" – 3:05
17. "Jeanie" – 2:59
18. "Chop Chop" – 2:57
19. "Spotlight" – 2:47
20. "Love Is Like Oxygen" (Album Version) – 6:50

== Personnel ==
Sweet

- Brian Connolly – lead vocals, background vocals
- Andy Scott – guitar, synthesizer, background vocals
- Steve Priest – bass guitar, background vocals
- Mick Tucker – drums, percussion, background vocals

== Charts ==
Chart performance for The Ballroom Blitz & More Sweet Hits
| Chart (1993–2001) | Peak position |
|---|---|
| Australian Albums (ARIA) | 19 |
| Danish Albums (Hitlisten) | 13 |
