= Richard Maltby =

Richard Maltby may refer to:

- Richard Maltby Sr. (1914–1991), American musician, conductor, arranger and bandleader
- Richard Maltby Jr. (born 1937), Broadway lyricist and director
