= At Shelly's Manne-Hole =

Live album by The Bill Evans Trio
- Released: 1963
- Recorded: May 14 & 19, 1963
- Venue: Shelly's Manne-Hole; 1608 North Cahuenga Blvd; Hollywood, California
- Genre: Jazz, post-bop
- Length: 47:40 (CD)
- Label: Riverside
- Producer: Orrin Keepnews

The Bill Evans Trio chronology
| Plays the Theme from The V.I.P.s and Other Great Songs (1963) | At Shelly's Manne-Hole (1963) | Time Remembered (1963) |

At Shelly's Manne-Hole (or more completely, Bill Evans Trio at Shelly's Manne-Hole, Hollywood, California) is a live album by American jazz pianist Bill Evans, released in 1963 as his last recording for the Riverside label. The trio featured Chuck Israels, who followed Scott LaFaro on bass in autumn 1961, and Larry Bunker on drums, who just joined the reformed trio, after Paul Motian had left. An additional eight performances recorded during the trio's May 1963 engagement at Shelly's Manne-Hole were released on the album Time Remembered.

== Reception ==
Professional ratings
Review scores
| Source | Rating |
|---|---|
| Allmusic | 4/5 stars |
| DownBeat | 4/5 stars |
| The Rolling Stone Jazz Record Guide | 4/5 stars |
| The Penguin Guide to Jazz Recordings | 3.5/4 stars |

Writing for Allmusic, music critic Daniel Gioffre wrote of the album: "This particular trio may lack some of the sheer combustive force of the better-known lineup, but it is, if possible, even more sensitive, melancholic, and nostalgic than the previous band... Jazz is rarely as sensitive or as melodic as this. Another classic from Bill Evans and company."

== Track listing ==
1. "Isn't It Romantic?" (Richard Rodgers, Lorenz Hart) – 4:37
2. "The Boy Next Door" (Hugh Martin, Ralph Blane) – 5:22
3. "Wonder Why" (Nicholas Brodszky, Sammy Cahn) – 5:15
4. "Swedish Pastry" (Barney Kessel) – 5:45
5. "Love Is Here to Stay" (George Gershwin, Ira Gershwin) – 4:46
6. "'Round Midnight" (Thelonious Monk) – 8:54
7. "Stella by Starlight" (Victor Young, Ned Washington) – 4:57
8. "All the Things You Are" (Jerome Kern, Oscar Hammerstein II) – 8:44
9. "Blues in F" (Chuck Israels) – 5:44

"All the Things You Are" was not part of the original album. It was first released on the 1989 digitally remastered CD as a bonus track. On later issues, the song appeared as the last track of the album.

== Personnel ==
- Bill Evans – piano
- Chuck Israels – bass
- Larry Bunker – drums
