= Hazzard =

German-British heavy metal band (1982–1985)

- Origin: Hanover, Germany
- Genres: Heavy metal
- Years active: 1982–1985
- Label: Mausoleum
- Past members: Herman Frank; Malcolm McNulty; Günter Sander; Wolfgang Hettmer; Dieter Schmidt

Hazzard were a German-British heavy metal band formed by Herman Frank of Accept fame. The band featured Malcolm McNulty on vocals, who later joined Sweet, and then Slade as Mal McNulty. Hazzard's only album release was mixed by Michael Wagener at Dierks Studios, Cologne. Herman Frank has also played in Victory and Sinner. He has worked as a record producer for Saxon and Rose Tattoo.

== Personnel ==
- Herman Frank – lead guitar
- Mal McNulty – vocals
- Günter Sander – rhythm guitar
- Wolfgang Hettmer – bass
- Dieter Schmidt – drums

== Discography ==
- Hazzard (1984 – Mausoleum Records)
