= Plays the Theme from The V.I.P.s and Other Great Songs =

Studio album by Bill Evans
- Released: 1963
- Recorded: May 6, 1963
- Genre: Jazz
- Label: MGM
- Producer: Creed Taylor

Bill Evans chronology
Conversations with Myself (1963)	Plays the Theme from The V.I.P.s and Other Great Songs (1963)	At Shelly's Manne-Hole (1963)

Plays the Theme from The V.I.P.s and Other Great Songs is an album of theme music by jazz pianist Bill Evans with an orchestra conducted by Claus Ogerman recorded in 1963 for the MGM label.

== Reception ==
The album was an intentionally commercial production and the tracks were omitted from the 18-CD collection The Complete Bill Evans on Verve as they were deemed to have negligible artistic merit. The Allmusic review awarded the album 3½ stars.

Professional ratings
Review scores
Source	Rating
Allmusic	3.5/5 stars

== Track listing ==
1. "Theme from "Mr. Novak"" (Lyn Murray) - 2:04
2. "The Caretakers Theme" (Elmer Bernstein) - 2:51
3. "More" (Riz Ortolani) - 2:40
4. "Walk on the Wild Side" (Bernstein, Mack David) - 2:33
5. "The Days of Wine and Roses" (Henry Mancini, Johnny Mercer) - 2:40
6. "Theme from "The V.I.P.s"" (Miklós Rózsa) - 2:28
7. "Hollywood" (Bill Evans, Claus Ogerman) - 3:35
8. "Sweet September" (Bill McGuffie) - 2:16
9. "On Green Dolphin Street" (Bronislaw Kaper, Ned Washington) - 2:42
10. "The Man with the Golden Arm" (Elmer Bernstein, Sylvia Fine) - 2:32
11. "Laura" (Johnny Mercer, David Raksin) - 2:31
12. "On Broadway" (Jerry Leiber, Barry Mann, Mike Stoller, Cynthia Weil) - 2:32

- Recorded in New York City on May 6, 1963

== Personnel ==
- Bill Evans - piano
- Unidentified large orchestra, strings and choir
- Claus Ogerman - arranger, conductor
