= Trio 64 =

Studio album by Bill Evans
- Released: 1964
- Recorded: December 18, 1963
- Venue: Webster Hall, New York City
- Genre: Jazz
- Length: 35:40 original LP
- Label: Verve; V6-8578
- Producer: Creed Taylor

Bill Evans chronology
Time Remembered (1963)	Trio 64 (1964)	Stan Getz & Bill Evans (1964)

Trio 64 is an album by the American jazz musician Bill Evans, released in 1964. It was simultaneously Gary Peacock's first and only recording with Evans and Paul Motian's final recording with the pianist.

== Reception ==
Writing for AllMusic, music critic Lindsay Palmer wrote of the album: "The effort spotlights their communal and intuitive musical discourse, hinging on an uncanny ability of the musicians to simultaneously hear and respond."

Professional ratings
Review scores
Source	Rating
AllMusic	4/5 stars
The Penguin Guide to Jazz Recordings	3.5/4 stars
Record Mirror	4/5 stars

== Track listing ==
1. "Little Lulu" (Kaye, Lippman, Wise) – 3:52
2. "A Sleepin' Bee" (Arlen, Capote) – 5:30
3. "Always" (Berlin) – 4:03
4. "Santa Claus Is Coming to Town" (Coots, Gillespie) – 4:25
5. "I'll See You Again" (Coward) – 3:57
6. "For Heaven's Sake" (Elise Bretton, Edwards, Donald Meyer) – 4:26
7. "Dancing in the Dark" (Dietz, Schwartz) – 4:36
8. "Everything Happens to Me" (Adair, Dennis) – 4:51

Bonus tracks on 1997 CD reissue:

9. "Little Lulu" – 4:39 (Alternative Take 1)
10. "Little Lulu" – 5:07 (Alternative Take 2)
11. "Always" – 4:18 (Alternative Take)
12. "I'll See You Again" – 4:30 (Alternative Take)
13. "My Heart Stood Still" (Lorenz Hart, Richard Rodgers) – 4:47 (Unused Title)
14. "Always" – 0:44 (Breakdown)
15. "I'll See You Again" – 0:21 (Breakdown)
16. "My Heart Stood Still" – 1:04 (False Starts)

== Personnel ==
- Bill Evans – piano
- Gary Peacock – acoustic bass
- Paul Motian – drums

Production notes:

- Jack Maher – liner notes
- Bob Simpson – engineer
- Creed Taylor – producer
- Val Valentin – director of engineering
