= Live at the Rainbow 1973 =

Live album by Sweet
- Released: 25 October 1999
- Recorded: 21 December 1973
- Genre: Glam rock, hard rock
- Length: 72:53
- Label: BMG
- Producer: Phil Wainman

Sweet chronology
Live in Denmark 1976 (1998)	Live at the Rainbow 1973 (1999)	Action: The Sweet Anthology (2009)

Professional ratings
Review scores
Source	Rating
AllMusic	3.5/5 stars

Live at the Rainbow 1973 is a live album by the British glam rock band Sweet, released in 1999. The album is a recording of a concert at the Rainbow Theatre, London on 21 December 1973.

This release marks the first time the Rainbow Theatre concert has been available in its entirety, seven of the tracks having been previously available on Sweet's 1975 double album Strung Up.

== Mono recording ==
Two recordings were made of the Rainbow Theatre show, a multitrack recording and a mono recording direct from the mixing console. Unfortunately, Mick Tucker's snare drum was missing from the multitrack, and he later overdubbed the snare drum in the studio on the seven tracks that were released in stereo on the album Strung Up.

As the unused tracks from the concert were not overdubbed; the only version of the complete concert with the snare drum was the mono recording, which is the recording used for this CD.

== Track listing ==
No.	Title	Writer(s)	Length
1.	"Intro - The Stripper"	David Rose	1:37
2.	"Hell Raiser"	Nicky Chinn, Mike Chapman	3:36
3.	"Burning"/"Someone Else Will"	Brian Connolly, Steve Priest, Andy Scott and Mick Tucker	5:53
4.	"Rock 'n' Roll Disgrace"	Connolly, Priest, Scott, Tucker	4:24
5.	"Wig-Wam Bam"	Chinn, Chapman	3:04
6.	"Need a Lot of Loving"	Connolly, Priest, Scott, Tucker	2:58
7.	"Done Me Wrong Alright"	Connolly, Priest, Scott, Tucker	8:14
8.	"You're Not Wrong For Loving Me"	Connolly, Priest, Scott, Tucker	3:19
9.	"The Man with the Golden Arm"	Elmer Bernstein, Sylvia Fine	13:02
10.	"Little Willy"	Chinn, Chapman	4:39
11.	"Teenage Rampage"	Chinn, Chapman	3:35
12.	"Rock 'n' Roll Medley": "Keep a-Knockin'"/"Shakin' All Over"/"Lucille"/"Great Balls of Fire"/"Reelin' and Rockin'"/"Peppermint Twist"/"Shout""	Perry Bradford, Little Richard/Johnny Kidd/Albert Collins, Little Richard/Otis Blackwell, Jack Hammer/Chuck Berry/Joey Dee, Henry Glover/ Rudolph Isley, Ronald Isley, O'Kelly Isley Jr.	8:28
13.	"Ballroom Blitz"	Chinn, Chapman	4:26
14.	"Blockbuster"	Chinn, Chapman	5:31
Total length:			72:53
