= Give Us a Wink =

Studio album by Sweet
- Released: 16 February 1976
- Recorded: 1975
- Studios: Musicland, Munich, Germany (except where indicated)
- Genres: Hard rock; glam rock; heavy metal
- Length: 38:14
- Labels: RCA, Capitol
- Producer: Sweet

Sweet chronology
Strung Up (1975)	Give Us a Wink (1976)	Off the Record (1977)

Singles from Give Us a Wink
- 1. "Action" Released: July 1975; 2. "The Lies in Your Eyes" Released: January 1976; 3. "4th of July" Released: 1976 (Australia only)

Professional ratings
Review scores
Source	Rating
AllMusic	3/5 stars
Christgau's Record Guide	C+

Give Us a Wink is the fourth studio album by English glam rock band Sweet. It was the first album to be fully written and produced by the band members. Previously they had relied on material from the songwriting team of Nicky Chinn and Mike Chapman. The album was released by RCA Records in Europe and Australia and by Capitol Records in the United States, Canada and Japan.

== RCA version ==
The album completed the group's move to the hard rock style that had always been the trademark of their self-penned B-sides. Give Us a Wink reached No. 3 in Sweden, No. 9 in Germany and made it into the Top 20 in Norway and Australia. The album didn't chart in Sweet's home territory, the UK.

The European album contains two singles, "Action" and "The Lies in Your Eyes", that were recorded and released prior to rest of the album. "Action" reached the top 10 in 1975 in numerous European countries but stalled at No. 15 in the UK Singles chart. Though "The Lies in Your Eyes" reached only No. 35 in the UK, it was popular in other parts of Europe as well as Australia. A third single, "4th of July", was released in Australia only but failed to chart.

A digitally remastered version was issued on CD in 1999 with two bonus tracks. Another re-mastered version was reissued on CD in 2005 with three bonus tracks.

== Capitol version ==
The version released in the United States and Canada flipped the two sides of the LP and added "Lady Starlight" as the third track on side two. This song was first released on the European version of the 1974 album Desolation Boulevard. The version of "Lady Starlight" on this album has synthesizers that are absent from the original. Give Us a Wink reached the Top 20 in Canada. "Action" reached the top 10 in 1975 in Canada. In the US it reached No. 15. The Japanese version of this album is the same but also adds "Fox on the Run" at the beginning of side two.

== Artwork ==
The album artwork was designed by the American artist Joe Petagno, who had already designed the previous Sweet album Strung Up (1975). The original LP cover was released with a die-cut cover that caused the eye to wink as the sleeve was removed and placed back into the cover.

== Songs recorded by other artists ==
"Action" has been played by several rock bands, notably Raven (on the album Rock Until You Drop), Black 'n Blue (on the album Black 'n Blue), Steve Stevens (on the Atomic Playboys album), and Def Leppard (as a UK Top 20 single and later on the album Retro Active). An unusual version was a cover by Scorpions under the pseudonym of The Hunters in 1975, sung in German and titled "Wenn es richtig losgeht".

== Track listing ==
All songs written and composed by Brian Connolly, Steve Priest, Andy Scott and Mick Tucker.

=== RCA release ===
Side one

1. "The Lies in Your Eyes" (recorded at AIR Studios, London) – 3:48
2. "Cockroach" – 4:51
3. "Keep It In" – 5:00
4. "4th of July" – 4:24

Side two

1. "Action" (recorded at Audio International Studios, London) – 3:44
2. "Yesterday's Rain" – 5:16
3. "White Mice" – 4:58
4. "Healer" – 7:17

==== Bonus tracks on 1990 CD reissue ====
1. "Fox on the Run" – 4:49
2. "Lady Starlight" (Andy Scott) – 3:09
3. "Sweet Fanny Adams" – 6:16
4. "Miss Demeanor" – 3:17

==== Bonus tracks on 1999 CD reissue ====
9. "Someone Else Will" – 3:25
10. "Miss Demeanor" – 3:17

==== Bonus tracks on 2005 CD reissue ====
9. "Action" (7" version) – 3:29
10. "Cockroach" (Munich mix) – 4:57
11. "4th of July" (Munich mix) – 4:22

=== Capitol release ===
Side one

1. "Action" – 3:44
2. "Yesterday's Rain" – 5:16
3. "White Mice" – 4:57
4. "Healer" – 7:16

Side two

1. "The Lies in Your Eyes" – 3:44
2. "Cockroach" – 4:49
3. "Lady Starlight" – 3:10
4. "Keep It In" – 4:57
5. "4th of July" – 4:22

=== Capitol version (Japanese release) ===
Side one

1. "Action" – 3:44
2. "Yesterday's Rain" – 5:16
3. "White Mice" – 4:57
4. "Healer" – 7:16

Side two

1. "Fox on the Run" – 3:24
2. "The Lies in Your Eyes" – 3:44
3. "Cockroach" – 4:49
4. "Lady Starlight" – 3:10
5. "Keep It In" – 4:57
6. "4th of July" – 4:22

== Personnel ==
Sweet

- Brian Connolly – lead vocals, synthesizers
- Steve Priest – bass, vocals, celli
- Andy Scott – guitars, vocals, celli, synthesizers, voice bag
- Mick Tucker – percussion, vocals, celli, phased gong

Additional personnel

- Louie Austin – engineer
- Trevor Griffin – piano solo (track 4)
- Mack – engineer
- Nick Ryan – engineer

== Charts ==
=== Weekly charts ===
Chart (1976)	Peak position
Australian Albums (Kent Music Report)	17
Canada Top Albums/CDs (RPM)	11
German Albums (Offizielle Top 100)	9
Japanese Albums (Oricon)	37
Norwegian Albums (VG-lista)	15
Swedish Albums (Sverigetopplistan)	3
US Billboard 200	27

=== Year-end charts ===
Chart (1976)	Position
German Albums (Offizielle Top 100)	49

== Certifications ==
Region	Certification	Certified units/sales
Japan (RIAJ)	Gold	100,000^{^}
^{^} Shipments figures based on certification alone.
