= Cut Above the Rest =

Studio album by Sweet
- Released: April 1979 (US); October 1979 (UK)
- Genres: Progressive rock; pop rock; glam rock
- Length: 40:50
- Labels: Polydor, Capitol
- Producer: Sweet

Sweet chronology
Level Headed (1978)	Cut Above the Rest (1979)	Waters Edge (1980)

Alternative cover
- European version cover

Cut Above the Rest is the seventh studio album by English glam rock band Sweet, released on Polydor Records in April 1979. It was their first album release following the departure of their original lead vocalist Brian Connolly. Connolly had begun recording this album with the band at the TownHouse Studio in Shepherd's Bush, London, but his vocals were subsequently wiped and replaced by vocals from bass player Steve Priest and guitarist Andy Scott. Original outtakes of "Play All Night" and "Stay With Me" (a.k.a. "Log One/That Girl") featuring Connolly's vocals have been recovered and were released on the rarities CD Platinum Rare.

Cut Above the Rest was released with two different sleeves: one for the US, Canada, Japan and UK markets and another (a wood carving of the three members' faces) for Europe.

== Reception ==
Professional ratings
Review scores
Source	Rating
AllMusic	2.5/5 stars

In their retrospective review, AllMusic described Cut Above the Rest as "a bizarre combination of the hard-rocking pop that dominated classic Sweet singles with progressive flights of fancy in a 10cc/Electric Light Orchestra vein, plus a dash of lounge lizard-ish soft rock balladry thrown in to cover all the pop/rock bases." They found that some of the excursions in this hodgepodge of styles were disastrous, but that the stronger cuts were distinctive and compelling enough to make the album as a whole memorable, albeit "too erratic" for casual listeners.

== Track listing ==
All songs written and composed by Steve Priest, Andy Scott and Mick Tucker except where noted.

Side one

1. "Call Me" (Scott) – 3:42
2. "Play All Night" – 3:15
3. "Big Apple Waltz" (Priest, Scott) – 4:03
4. "Dorian Gray" – 4:44
5. "Discophony (Dis-Kof-O-Ne)" (Priest, Scott, Tucker, Gary Moberley) – 5:25

Side two

1. "Eye Games" (Scott, Louis Austin) – 1:58
2. "Mother Earth" (Priest, Scott) – 6:31
3. "Hold Me" (Scott) – 6:06
4. "Stay With Me" – 5:06

=== Bonus tracks on 2010 reissue ===
10. "Call Me" (7" version) – 2:54
11. "Why Don't You" – 3:25
12. "Mother Earth" (7" version) – 3:59

== Personnel ==
Sweet

- Steve Priest – bass, harmonica, lead vocals, backing vocals
- Andy Scott – guitar, synthesizer, lead vocals, backing vocals
- Mick Tucker – drums, percussion, lead vocals, backing vocals

Additional personnel

- Louis Austin – engineer
- Norman Goodman – artwork
- Eddie Hardin – soloist
- Gary Moberley – piano
- Geoff Westley – arranger, piano

== Releases ==
- CD Cut Above the Rest Repertoire 1992
- CD Cut Above the Rest Repertoire 1999
- CD Cut Above the Rest Repertoire 2003
- CD Cut Above the Rest 7T's / Glam 2010
