= Richard Maltby Sr. =

American composer, bandleader, arranger (1914–1991)

- Born: Richard Eldridge Maltby; June 26, 1914; Chicago, Illinois, U.S.
- Died: August 19, 1991 (aged 77) Santa Monica, California, U.S.
- Genres: Swing, big band
- Occupations: Bandleader, pianist, composer
- Instruments: Piano, trumpet
- Years active: 1930s–1960s

Richard Eldridge Maltby Sr. (June 26, 1914 – August 19, 1991) was an American musician, conductor, arranger and bandleader, most notable for his 1956 recording "(Themes from) The Man with the Golden Arm". He was also the father of the Broadway lyricist and director Richard Maltby Jr.

After studying briefly at Northwestern University's music school, he left college to become a full-time musician. He played trumpet with several big bands, including those of Jack Little, Roger Pryor, Bob Strong and Henry Busse, as well as also doing some arranging. In 1940, he took a job as an arranger for the orchestra of the Chicago-based radio station, WBBM, before moving to New York City in 1945 to become an arranger-conductor on network radio, where he worked with Paul Whiteman. In 1942, Benny Goodman recorded his composition "Six Flats Unfurnished."

During the post-war years, he made several recordings for subsidiary labels of RCA Victor, and in 1954, finally scored a Top 40 hit with "St. Louis Blues Mambo". In 1955, he began leading his own dance band, with which he had his Top 20 hit, "(Themes From) The Man With the Golden Arm", in the spring of the following year. He left RCA for Columbia Records in 1959, then moved to Roulette Records a year later. He stopped recording on his own during the mid-1960s.

He was also the musical director of SESAC Jazz Classics between 1950 and 1965, and recorded several transcriptions for radio. As a conductor, he worked with singers such as Peggy Lee, Sarah Vaughan, Johnnie Ray, Vic Damone and Ethel Merman, and after he stopped recording on his own, he served as an arranger and conductor for Lawrence Welk on records and television.

A heart condition in his later years forced him into retirement, and he underwent several operations prior to his death. He died in 1991, aged 77.

== See also ==
- Ralph Patt, jazz guitarist who toured with Maltby

== Bibliography ==
- Kinkle, Roger (1974), The Complete Encyclopedia of Popular Music and Jazz, 1900-1950, V. 3, New Rochelle, NY: Arlington House, Publishers, ISBN 0-87000-229-5.
