= James B. Davis (musician) =

American gospel singer

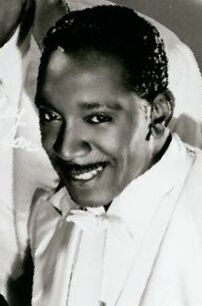
- Davis in a publicity photo with The Dixie Hummingbirds

Background information
- Born: June 6, 1916
- Died: April 17, 2007 (aged 90)
- Genres: Gospel
- Occupation: musician
- Instrument: vocals
- Years active: 1928–1984
- Formerly of: The Dixie Hummingbirds

James Bodie Davis (June 6, 1916 – April 17, 2007) was an American gospel music singer and a founder of The Dixie Hummingbirds, one of the longest-lasting and most influential groups in gospel music.

In 1928, at age 12, he founded as the Sterling High School Quartet in Greenville, South Carolina, but took the present name the following year. The group's sound changed when Ira Tucker joined in 1938, and they recorded their first album on the Decca Records label. During a lifetime of touring and recording, he was the business leader and disciplinarian.

Highlights include singing at the 1966 Newport Folk Festival and recording with Paul Simon on his 1973 song "Loves Me Like a Rock." The Dixie Hummingbirds cover of the Paul Simon song won a 1973 Grammy Award in the soul gospel category. They also had a nomination in 2007 for best traditional gospel album, for Still Keeping It Real (MCG Records).

Davis retired in 1984. He died of a heart ailment in Philadelphia, Pennsylvania.
