= Waters Edge =

Studio album by Sweet
- Released: April 1980
- Recorded: 1980
- Genres: Pop rock; glam rock
- Length: 36:02 (Europe); 34:41 (US/Canada)
- Label: Polydor
- Producers: Sweet, Pip Williams

Sweet chronology
Cut Above the Rest (1979)	Waters Edge (1980)	Identity Crisis (1982)

Alternative cover
- Cover of US/Canada version

Professional ratings
Review scores
Source	Rating
AllMusic	3.5/5 stars
The Rolling Stone Album Guide	3/5 stars

Waters Edge is the eighth studio album by English glam rock band Sweet, released in 1980. It lacks the experimentation of the band's previous two albums, Level Headed (1978) and Cut Above the Rest (1979), going back to a more radio-friendly sound, but with slicker production. The album bore no hits and was poorly received.

== Track listing ==
All songs written and composed by Steve Priest, Andy Scott and Mick Tucker except where noted.

=== European release ===
1. "Sixties Man" (Peter Hutchins, Pip Williams) – 4:12
2. "Getting in the Mood for Love" – 3:04
3. "Tell the Truth" (Priest, Scott, Gary Moberley) – 3:34
4. "Own Up" – 3:19
5. "Too Much Talking" (Ray McRiner) – 3:57
6. "Thank You for Loving Me" (Scott, Moberley) – 3:43
7. "At Midnight" (Scott) – 3:20
8. "Waters Edge" – 2:59
9. "Hot Shot Gambler" (Priest) – 3:34
10. "Give the Lady Some Respect" (McRiner) – 4:30

The song "Own Up" is different from "Own Up, Take a Look at Yourself", released as B-side to the single "Teenage Rampage" in 1974.

==== Bonus tracks on 2010 reissue ====
11. "Tall Girls" – 4:30
12. "Oh Yeah!" – 2:21
13. "Sixties Man" (single version) – 3:52
14. "Give The Lady Some Respect" (single version) – 3:27

=== US/Canada release (LP only) ===
This album was released in the US and Canada as VI, a generic title referring to the fact it was Sweet's sixth album released on Capitol Records. It has a different cover, sleeve and track listing from Polydor's version:

Side one

1. "Sixties Man" – 4:08
2. "Own Up" – 3:16
3. "Too Much Talking" – 3:57
4. "Tell the Truth" – 3:30
5. "Getting in the Mood for Love" (edited) – 3:01

Side two

1. "Thank You for Loving Me" – 3:40
2. "At Midnight" – 3:16
3. "Waters Edge" – 2:54
4. "Hot Shot Gambler" – 3:32
5. "Give the Lady Some Respect" (single version) – 3:27

To date, the VI version of this album has never been reissued on CD.

== Personnel ==
Sweet

- Steve Priest – bass guitar, lead vocals (tracks 1, 2, 8, 9, 10), co-lead vocals (tracks 3, 6), backing vocals
- Andy Scott – guitars, synthesisers, lead vocals (tracks 5, 7), co-lead vocals (tracks 3, 6), backing vocals
- Mick Tucker – drums, percussion, lead vocals (track 4), backing vocals

Additional personnel

- Gary Moberley – keyboards
- Pip Williams – production (tracks 1, 10)
