= Soloist =

Soloist may refer to:

- Soloist (ballet), a rank within a ballet company above corps de ballet but below principal dancer
- Soloist (card player), a player who plays a solo against two or more others in a card game
- Solo (music), a piece or section of music played or sung by a single musician
- Solo (dance), a dance or part of a dance featuring or highlighting a single dancer
- In mountaineering, someone who specializes in solo climbing
- The Soloist, a 2009 American drama film.
- Jackson Soloist, a guitar model by Jackson Guitars
- Rockman Soloist, a guitar amplifier part of the Rockman series

== See also ==
- Solo (disambiguation)
- Cantor (disambiguation)
