= The Sweet Singles Album =

The Sweet Singles album

Compilation album by Sweet
- Released: 1975
- Genre: Glam rock; hard rock
- Length: 37:44
- Label: RCA
- Producer: Phil Wainman

Sweet chronology
Desolation Boulevard (1974)	The Sweet Singles album (1975)	Strung Up (1975)

The Sweet Singles Album is a 1975 compilation album by Sweet released on RCA Records for the Australia and New Zealand market only. It was released by RCA Australia, mainly to capitalise on The Sweet's various heavier singles from the 1973-74 period, ahead of the band visiting the region and touring. The Sweet Singles Album does not replace any of the original European Sweet release albums but complements them. The track listing shows a harder rock style and a move away from the softer bubblegum tracks of the earlier 1968-72 period.

The Sweet toured Australia and New Zealand later in 1975, to much success. By the end of 1975, The Sweet had a number of albums in the charts plus two big hit singles, "Peppermint Twist" and "Fox on the Run". "Peppermint Twist" was also an Australian only release, being taken as a single, from the Sweet Fanny Adams album.

The Sweet Singles Album itself was available right through the 1970s, before being deleted by RCA Australia, around 1979. To date, it is one of the last few Sweet albums yet to make it to compact disc, both in original running track order plus artwork.

== LP track listing ==
Side one

1. "The Ballroom Blitz" (Chapman, Chinn) – 3:59
2. "Man From Mecca" (Connolly, Priest, Scott, Tucker) – 2:45
3. "New York Connection" (Connolly, Priest, Scott, Tucker) – 3:35
4. "Need A Lot of Lovin'" (Connolly, Priest, Scott, Tucker) – 3:00
5. "Burning" (Connolly, Priest, Scott, Tucker) – 4:04
6. "Teenage Rampage" (Chapman, Chinn) – 3:32

Side two

1. "Block Buster!" (Chapman, Chinn) – 3:12
2. "Rock and Roll Disgrace" (Connolly, Priest, Scott, Tucker) – 3:50
3. "Own Up, Take A Look at Yourself" (Connolly, Priest, Scott, Tucker) – 3:55
4. "Burn on the Flame" (Connolly, Priest, Scott, Tucker) – 3:37
5. "Hellraiser" (Chapman, Chinn) – 3:15

== Cassette track listing ==
Side one

1. "Man from Mecca" (Connolly, Priest, Scott, Tucker) – 2:45
2. "New York Connection" (Connolly, Priest, Scott, Tucker) – 3:35
3. "Need a Lot of Lovin'" (Connolly, Priest, Scott, Tucker) – 3:00
4. "Teenage Rampage" (Chinn, Chapman) – 3:32
5. "Hellraiser" (Chinn, Chapman) – 3:15
6. "Block Buster!" (Chinn, Chapman) – 3:12

Side two

1. "Rock and Roll Disgrace" (Connolly, Priest, Scott, Tucker) – 3:50
2. "Own Up, Take a Look at Yourself" (Connolly, Priest, Scott, Tucker) – 3:55
3. "Burn on the Flame" (Connolly, Priest, Scott, Tucker) – 3:37
4. "The Ballroom Blitz" (Chinn, Chapman) – 3:59
5. "Burning" (Connolly, Priest, Scott, Tucker) – 4:04

== Charts ==
=== Weekly charts ===
Chart (1975)	Peak position
Australian Albums (Kent Music Report)	2
New Zealand Albums (RMNZ)	21

=== Year-end charts ===
Chart (1975)	Peak position
Australia (Kent Music Report)	23
