= Mal McNulty =

British rock musician (born 1951)

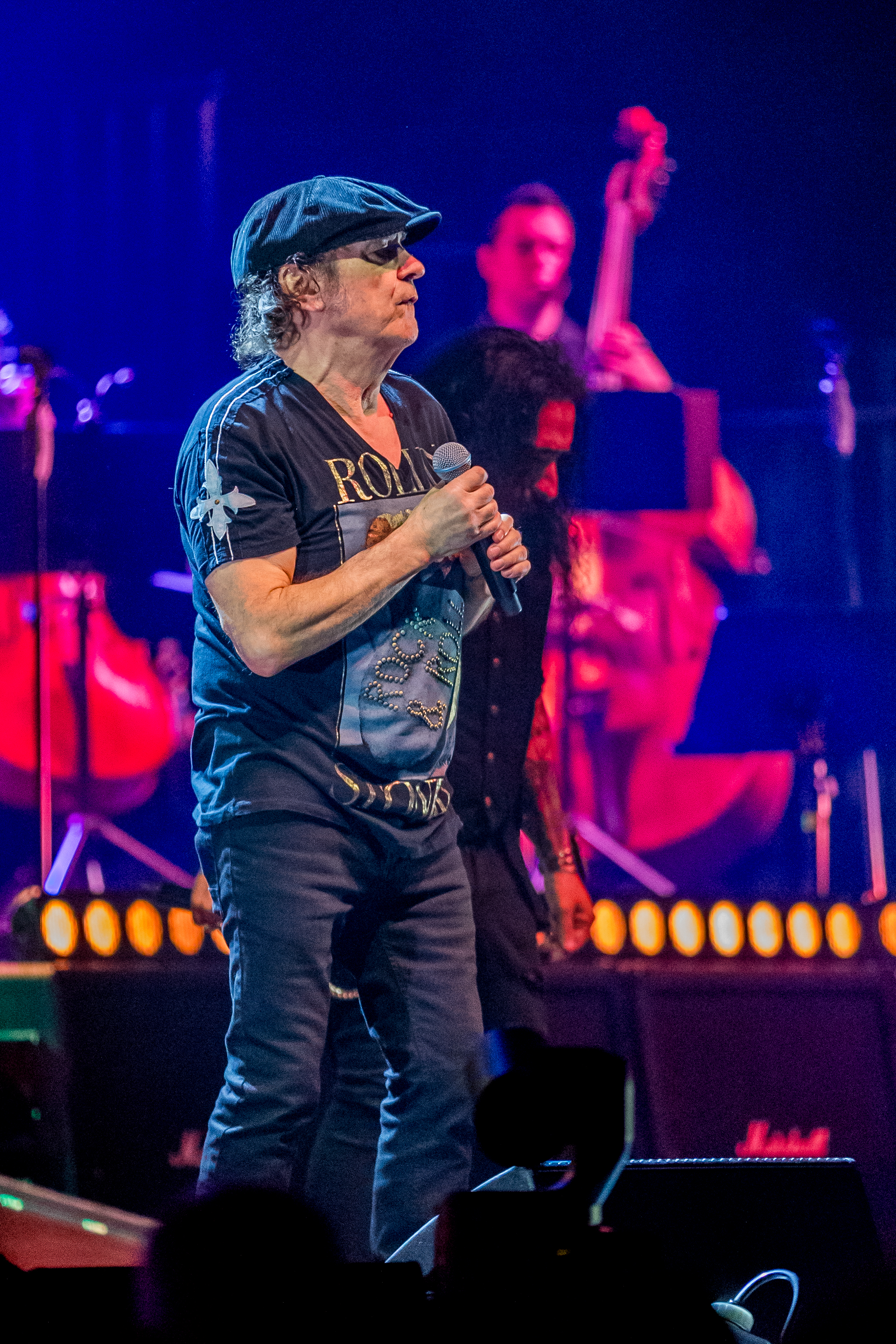
- McNulty performing in 2025

Background information
- Born: Malcolm McNulty; 7 December 1951 (age 74); Liverpool, England
- Genres: Glam rock, hard rock, heavy metal
- Occupations: Singer, musician, songwriter
- Instruments: Vocals, guitar, bass
- Years active: 1982–present
- Formerly of: Hazzard; The Sweet; Ole; Paddy Goes to Holyhead; Slade

Malcolm McNulty (born 7 December 1951) is an English rock musician, best known as a vocalist with Hazzard, bass player then vocalist with Sweet, and as a former vocalist and guitarist with Slade from 2005 to 2019.

== Biography ==
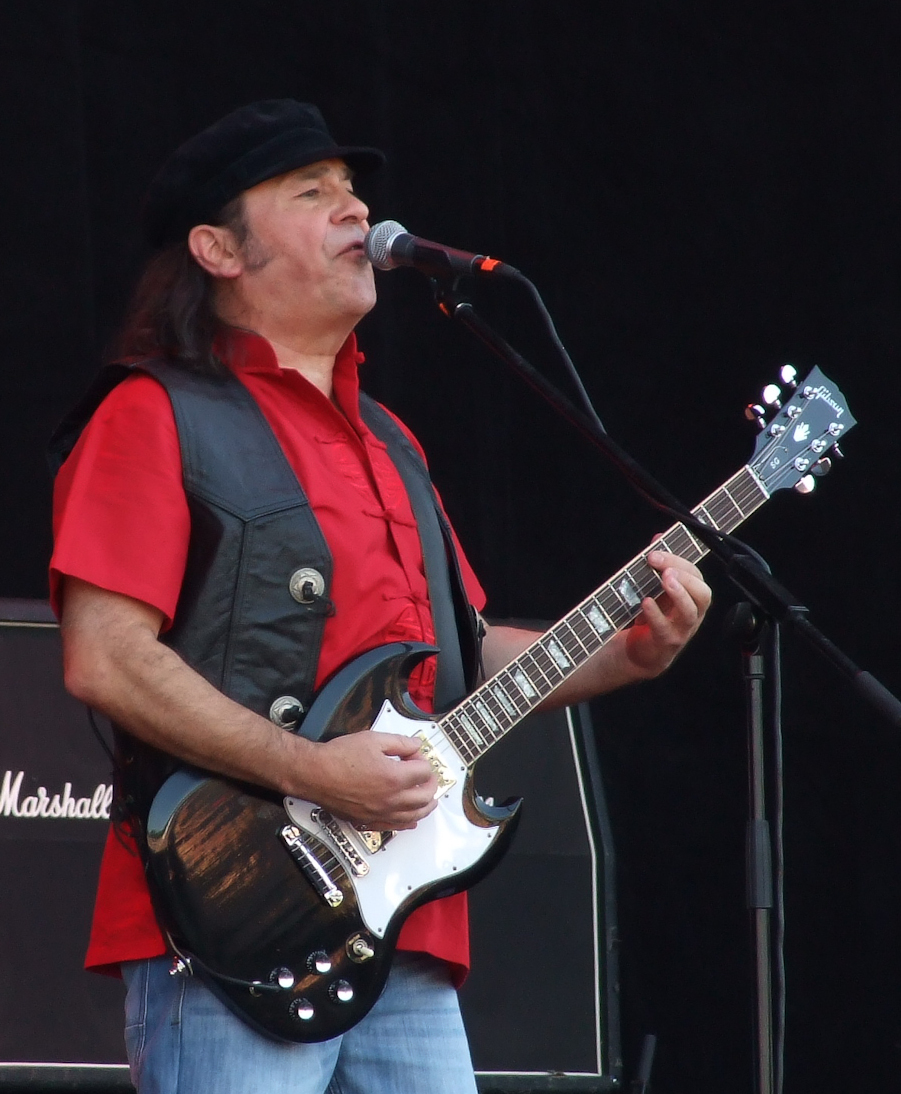
McNulty performing with Slade in 2011

McNulty was born in Liverpool in December 1951. He joined German heavy rock band Hazzard in 1984, which had been formed by Herman Frank, formerly of Accept, and recorded their debut album Hazzard. In 1985, he was invited to join Sweet, where he played bass before taking over vocals, recording the albums Live at the Marquee, A and Alive & Giggin'! as well as the singles "X-Ray-Specs" and "Stand Up". He left the band in 1994. During his time with Sweet, he also collaborated on the side project, Paddy Goes to Holyhead with Andy Scott (also of Sweet), releasing two singles, the Tom Jones covers "The Green Green Grass of Home" and "Delilah" in 1987 (the former in turn being a cover of the Curly Putman-penned song first performed by Johnny Darrell and first popularised by Porter Wagoner). He also played session bass and sang backing vocals for Norwegian Ole I'Dole on This Ole Town. In 2005, he joined Slade on vocals and guitar, taking over from Steve Whalley.

== Discography ==
=== Albums ===
Hazzard

- 1984 – Hazzard (Mausoleum Records)

Ole

- 1987 – This Ole Town (Mercury)

Sweet

- 1986 – Live at the Marquee (SPV Records)
- 1992 – A (SPV Records), now re-released as The Answer
- 1995 – Alive & Giggin'! (Pseudonym)
- 2013 – The Answer (Angel Air)

=== Singles ===
Paddy Goes to Holyhead

- 1987 – "The Green Green Grass of Home" (Jackeen Records)
- 1987 – "Delilah" (Rage Records)

Sweet

- 1991 – "X-Ray-Specs" (SPV Records)
- 1992 – "Stand Up" (SPV Records)

=== Videos ===
Sweet

- 1986 – Live at the Marquee (SPV Records)
- 1992 – Live at the Capitol (SPV Records)

Slade

- 2015 – Live at Koko (Wienerworld)
