= Identity Crisis (Sweet album) =

1982 studio album by Sweet

Studio album by Sweet
- Released: November 1982
- Recorded: September 1980–1981
- Genres: Hard rock; glam rock
- Length: 33:01
- Label: Polydor
- Producer: Sweet

Sweet chronology
Waters Edge (1980)	Identity Crisis (1982)	The Ballroom Blitz & More Sweet Hits (1992)

Professional ratings
Review scores
Source	Rating
AllMusic	2/5 stars

Identity Crisis is the ninth and final studio album by English glam rock band Sweet. It sees the band return to a hard rock sound not seen since 1977's Off the Record. The album bore no hits, and was only released in Germany, Peru and Mexico via Polydor Records in 1982 by which time Sweet had effectively split.

== Track listing ==
All songs written and composed by Steve Priest, Andy Scott and Mick Tucker except where noted.

Side one

1. "Identity Crisis" – 4:06
2. "New Shoes" – 3:22
3. "Two into One" – 2:37
4. "Love Is the Cure" (Scott) – 3:40
5. "It Makes Me Wonder" – 3:24

Side two

1. "Hey Mama" – 3:28
2. "Falling in Love" – 4:42
3. "I Wish You Would" (Billy Boy Arnold) – 3:12
4. "Strange Girl" – 4:30

== Personnel ==
Sweet

- Steve Priest – bass guitar, lead vocals, backing vocals
- Andy Scott – guitars, co-lead vocals (track 5), backing vocals
- Mick Tucker – drums, backing vocals

Technical

- Louis Austin – engineer
