= Funny, Funny =

1971 single by the Sweet

- German release picture sleeve

Single by the Sweet

from the album Funny How Sweet Co-Co Can Be
- B-side: "You're Not Wrong for Loving Me"
- Released: 29 January 1971
- Genre: Bubblegum; pop rock
- Length: 2:46
- Label: RCA Victor
- Songwriters: Nicky Chinn; Mike Chapman
- Producer: Phil Wainman

The Sweet singles chronology
| "Get on the Line" (1970) | "Funny, Funny" (1971) | "Co-Co" (1971) |

"Funny, Funny" is a song by English glam rock band the Sweet, released in 1971 as the first single from their debut album Funny How Sweet Co-Co Can Be. It became their first chart hit, peaking at number 13 on the UK Singles Chart.

Robin Carmody of Freaky Trigger described the "particularly fine" song as the strongest example of the Sweet's early bubblegum sound, before the group's music became heavier.

== Track listing ==
7-inch single

1. "Funny, Funny" – 2:46
2. "You're Not Wrong for Loving Me" – 2:45

== Charts ==
=== Weekly charts ===
| Chart (1971) | Peak position |
|---|---|
| Australia (Kent Music Report) | 93 |
| Belgium (Ultratop 50 Flanders) | 1 |
| Belgium (Ultratop 50 Wallonia) | 4 |
| Denmark (IFPI) | 2 |
| Finland (Suomen virallinen lista) | 5 |
| Germany (GfK) | 5 |
| Ireland (IRMA) | 7 |
| Netherlands (Dutch Top 40) | 1 |
| Netherlands (Single Top 100) | 1 |
| Norway (VG-lista) | 2 |
| Rhodesia (Lyons Maid) | 2 |
| South Africa (Springbok Radio) | 1 |
| Spain (Promusicae) | 12 |
| Sweden (Kvällstoppen) | 1 |
| UK Singles (OCC) | 13 |

=== Year-end charts ===
| Chart (1971) | Position |
|---|---|
| Belgium (Ultratop Flanders) | 12 |
| Denmark (IFPI) | 6 |
| Germany (GfK Entertainment) | 23 |
| Netherlands (Dutch Top 40) | 15 |
| Netherlands (Single Top 100) | 17 |
| South Africa (Springbok Radio) | 4 |
