= The Boy Next Door (song) =

1944 song by Hugh Martin and Ralph Blane

"The Boy Next Door" is a 1944 popular song by Hugh Martin and Ralph Blane. It was introduced in the musical film Meet Me in St. Louis, where it was performed by Judy Garland to an arrangement of Conrad Salinger conducted by Georgie Stoll. It has been praised as a perfect example of how to advance story and reveal a character’s emotions efficiently on screen.

In 1954, Vic Damone sang it in the first minutes of the film Athena. It has subsequently become a popular standard, performed by many artists. It is sometimes performed and recorded under the title "The Girl Next Door".

== Other recordings ==
- Judy Garland - recorded for Decca Records (catalog No. 23362) on April 20, 1944, using essentially the same soundtrack arrangement but with a shortened orchestral interlude.
- Frank Sinatra - Songs for Young Lovers (1954, Capitol) and All Alone (1962, Reprise)
- Don Fagerquist - Portrait of a Great Jazz Artist (1956).
- Sarah Vaughan - Sassy (1956)
- Bill Evans - At Shelly's Manne-Hole (1963)
- Barbra Streisand - Simply Streisand (1967)
