= Love Is Like Oxygen =

Single by Sweet

from the album Level Headed
- B-side: "Cover Girl"
- Released: 6 January 1978
- Recorded: 1977
- Genre: Glam rock; progressive rock; power pop; disco-rock
- Length: 6:57 (album version); 3:46 (single version)
- Label: Polydor; Capitol
- Songwriters: Andy Scott; Trevor Griffin
- Producer: Sweet

Sweet singles chronology
"Funk It Up" (1977)	"Love Is Like Oxygen" (1978)	"California Nights" (1978)

"Love Is Like Oxygen"
- France single

"Love Is Like Oxygen"
- Netherlands single

"Love Is Like Oxygen" is a song by English glam rock band Sweet that was released in January 1978. It was co-written by the group's guitarist Andy Scott, and Trevor Griffin, a musician who had played with various unsuccessful bands before becoming a roadie and sound engineer. The song was a departure from earlier recordings by Sweet, which were more guitar-driven, and featured high vocal harmonies. The extended album version of the song (6 minutes 57 seconds), which appeared on their album Level Headed, incorporates strings and has some disco elements.

Their first release on the Polydor label after their departure from RCA, it was also their last Top 10 hit, reaching No. 4 in New Zealand; No. 6 in Switzerland; No. 8 in Belgium, Canada, and the United States; No. 9 in the United Kingdom and Australia; and No. 10 in West Germany.

Later that year it was honoured with a Song of the Year nomination at the Ivor Novello Awards, but it lost to "Baker Street" by Gerry Rafferty. The song is frequently included on greatest hits compilations, usually in its edited single version.

== Chart performance ==
=== Weekly charts ===
Chart (1978)	Peak position
Australia (Kent Music Report)	9
Austria	23
Belgium	8
Canada	8
Finland	7
West Germany	10
Ireland (IRMA)	8
Netherlands	16
New Zealand	6
Switzerland	6
UK Singles Chart	9
US Billboard Hot 100	8

=== Year-end charts ===
Chart (1978)	Rank
Australia (Kent Music Report)	55
Canada	63
New Zealand	29
U.S. Billboard Hot 100	23
