= Funny How Sweet Co-Co Can Be =

Studio album by The Sweet
- Released: 26 November 1971
- Studio: Nova Sound Studios, London
- Genre: Bubblegum; pop rock; glam rock
- Length: 34:54
- Label: RCA Victor
- Producer: Phil Wainman

The Sweet chronology
Gimme Dat Ding (1970)	Funny How Sweet Co-Co Can Be (1971)	The Sweet's Biggest Hits (1972)

Singles from Funny How Sweet Co-Co Can Be
- 1. "Funny, Funny" Released: 29 January 1971; 2. "Co-Co" Released: 4 June 1971

Alternative cover
- Original German LP cover

Professional ratings
Review scores
Source	Rating
AllMusic	4/5 stars

Funny How Sweet Co-Co Can Be is the debut album by English glam rock band the Sweet, released in November 1971 on RCA Records in the UK. It reached No. 1 in Finland in February 1972. Two hit singles were released off the album in the UK, "Funny Funny" (No. 13 in March 1971) and "Co-Co" (No. 2 in June). In the United States, only "Co-Co" charted, reaching No. 99 in October.

RCA released the album in West Germany under the title Funny Funny, How Sweet Co-Co Can Be with a different cover and an extra song. That song, "Done Me Wrong All Right", was included as an extra track on the 1991 BMG Music CD reissue. It is also the first bonus track on the CD reissue from 24 January 2005.

== Track listing ==
All songs written and composed by Mike Chapman and Nicky Chinn except where noted.

Side one

1. "Co-Co" – 3:14
2. "Chop Chop" – 3:00
3. "Reflections" (Brian Holland, Lamont Dozier, Edward Holland Jr.) – 2:52
4. "Honeysuckle Love" (Brian Connolly, Steve Priest, Andy Scott, Mick Tucker) – 2:55
5. "Santa Monica Sunshine" – 3:20
6. "Daydream" (John Sebastian) – 3:13

Side two

1. "Funny, Funny" – 2:46
2. "Tom Tom Turnaround" – 4:07
3. "Jeanie" (Connolly, Priest, Scott, Tucker) – 2:58
4. "Sunny Sleeps Late" – 2:58
5. "Spotlight" (Connolly, Priest, Scott, Tucker) – 2:47
6. "Done Me Wrong All Right" (Connolly, Priest, Scott, Tucker) – 2:57 (missing on some original editions – bonus track on all CD editions of the album)

=== Bonus tracks on 2005 reissue ===
13. "Be with You Soon" (out-take) (Scott) – 3:34
14. "You're Not Wrong for Loving Me" (single B-side) (Connolly, Priest, Scott, Tucker) – 2:44
15. "Alexander Graham Bell" (single A-side) – 2:53
16. "Poppa Joe" (single A-side) – 3:07
17. "Little Willy" (single A-side) – 3:10
18. "Man from Mecca" (single B-side) (Connolly, Priest, Scott, Tucker) – 2:45
19. "Wig-Wam Bam" (single A-side) – 3:01
20. "New York Connection" (single B-side) (Connolly, Priest, Scott, Tucker) – 4:01
21. "Paperback Writer" (Japanese single A-side, b/w "Chop Chop") (John Lennon, Paul McCartney) – 2:18 (not included on 2015 reissue)
22. "Lucille / Great Balls of Fire" (BBC session) (Al Collins, Little Richard / Otis Blackwell, Jack Hammer) – 2:47 (not included on 2015 reissue)

=== Disc 2 of 2015 reissue ===
1. "Slow Motion" (1st single A-side Fontana, 1968) (Watkins)
2. "It's Lonely Out There" (1st single B-side) (Siegel, Jay)
3. "Lollipop Man" (2nd single A-side Parlophone, 1969) (Albert Hammond, Mike Hazlewood)
4. "Time" (2nd single B-side) (Brian Connolly, Steve Priest, Mick Stewart, Mick Tucker)
5. "All You'll Ever Get from Me" (3rd single A-side Parlophone, 1969) (Roger Cook, Roger Greenaway)
6. "The Juicer" (3rd single B-side) (Mick Stewart)
7. "Get on the Line" (4th single A-side Parlophone, 1970) (Jeff Barry, Andy Kim)
8. "Mr. McGallagher" (4th single B-side) (Mick Stewart)

== Personnel ==
The Sweet

- Brian Connolly – lead vocals (except as noted)
- Steve Priest – bass guitar (except 1, 7, 15, 16, 17), backing vocals
- Andy Scott – guitars (except 1, 7, 15, 16, 17), lead vocals (track 13), backing vocals (except track 7)
- Mick Tucker – drums (except 1, 7, 15, 16, 17), backing vocals
- Frank Torpey – guitar (disc 2, tracks 1, 2)
- Mick Stewart – guitar (disc 2, tracks 3, 4, 5, 6, 7, 8)

Additional personnel

- John Roberts – bass (tracks 1, 7, 15, 16, 17)
- Phil Wainman – drums, percussion (tracks 1, 7, 15, 16, 17), production
- Pip Williams – guitar (tracks 1, 7, 15, 16, 17), arrangement (track 3)
- Fiachra Trench – arrangements (tracks 2, 5, 6, 8)
