= (Themes from) The Man with the Golden Arm =

Single by Richard Maltby & His Orchestra
- B-side: "The Heart of Paris"
- Released: March 1956
- Genre: Jazz
- Length: 2:22
- Label: Vik
- Songwriter: Elmer Bernstein

Richard Maltby & His Orchestra singles chronology
| "Four or Five Times" (1955) | "(Themes from) The Man with the Golden Arm" (1956) | "Raucous Maracas" (1956) |

"(Themes from) The Man with the Golden Arm" is a song written by Elmer Bernstein and performed by Richard Maltby & His Orchestra. It was featured in the 1955 film The Man with the Golden Arm, and reached number 14 on the Billboard chart in 1956.

== Other charting versions ==
- Bernstein released a version in 1956 that reached number 16 in the U.S.
- Dick Jacobs released a version in 1956 that reached number 22 in the U.S.
- Billy May released a version in 1956 that reached number 9 on the UK Singles Chart and number 49 in the U.S.
- Les Elgart released a version in 1956 that reached number 56 in the U.S.
- Buddy Morrow released a version in 1956 that reached number 82 in the U.S.
- Jet Harris released a version in 1962 that reached number 12 in the U.K.

== Other versions ==
- Eddie Calvert released a version as a single in 1956, but it did not chart.
- Jonah Jones released a version on his 1957 EP Muted Jazz.
- Jimmy McGriff released a version as the B-side to his 1964 single "Topkapi".
- Billy Strange released a version as the B-side to his 1965 single "Raunchy".
- Bill Evans released a version on his 1963 album Plays the Theme from The V.I.P.s and Other Great Songs.
- Jimmy Smith released a version on his 1965 album Monster.
- The Sweet released a version on their 1974 album Desolation Boulevard.
- Bachelors From Prague released a version on their 1988 album The Energetic Cool
