= Level Headed =

Studio album by Sweet
- Released: January 1978
- Recorded: 1977
- Studios: Château d'Hérouville, France; Kingsway, London
- Genres: Neo-prog; art rock; pop rock; glam rock
- Length: 39:53 (Polydor version); 38:54 (Capitol version)
- Labels: Polydor; Capitol
- Producer: Sweet

Sweet chronology
The Golden Greats (1977)	Level Headed (1978)	Cut Above the Rest (1979)

US release

Singles from Level Headed
- 1. "Love Is Like Oxygen" Released: January 1978; 2. "California Nights" Released: July 1978 (US)

Level Headed is the sixth studio album by British glam rock band Sweet. Different versions were released by Polydor in Europe and by Capitol in the US, Canada and Japan. The album features "Love Is Like Oxygen", the band's last single to hit the top 40, peaking at No. 8 in the US and No. 9 in the UK. The single version of "Love Is Like Oxygen" is substantially shorter than the album version. A second single, "California Nights", was released from the album but only reached No. 76 in the US.

This was the last album to feature the classic Sweet line-up, as Brian Connolly departed around a year after the album's release, in order to embark on a solo career. The remaining trio of Steve Priest, Andy Scott, and Mick Tucker continued, and delivered three more albums before breaking up in 1981.

== Reception ==
Professional ratings
Review scores
Source	Rating
AllMusic	4/5 stars
The Encyclopedia of Popular Music	2/5 stars
(The New) Rolling Stone Album Guide	2/5 stars

AllMusic lauded the album in their retrospective review, praising the wild sampling of styles and the band's shift from their earlier bubblegum singles to album-driven rock. They concluded: "Certainly, this is not classic-era Sweet, but that's precisely what's good about Level Headed – they're off-kilter and adventurous, occasionally stumbling but always making interesting music on an album that's anything but what the title promises."

== Track listing ==
All songs written and composed by Brian Connolly, Steve Priest, Andy Scott, and Mick Tucker except where noted.

=== Polydor release ===
Side one

1. "Dream On" (Scott) – 2:53
2. "Love Is Like Oxygen" (Scott, Trevor Griffin) – 6:53
3. "California Nights" – 3:45
4. "Strong Love" – 3:28
5. "Fountain" – 4:44

Side two

1. "Anthem No. I (Lady of the Lake)" – 4:11
2. "Silverbird" – 3:26
3. "Lettres D'Amour" – 3:30
4. "Anthem No. II" – 1:02
5. "Air on 'A' Tape Loop" (Priest, Scott, Tucker) – 5:59

==== Bonus tracks on 1991/1997 reissues ====
1. "Love Is Like Oxygen" (single version) – 3:48
2. "Cover Girl" – 3:34
3. "California Nights" (single version) – 3:22
4. "Show Me The Way" – 3:22

==== Bonus track on 2005 reissue ====
1. "Love Is Like Oxygen" (single version) – 3:49

=== Capitol release ===
This version has different artwork and a different running order

Side one

1. "California Nights" – 3:39
2. "Silverbird" – 3:24
3. "Dream On" – 2:50
4. "Fountain" (last part with harpsichord is shorter and no hi-hat cymbals) – 4:12
5. "Love Is Like Oxygen" – 6:49

Side two

1. "Anthem No. I (Lady of the Lake)" – 4:08
2. "Strong Love" – 3:28
3. "Lettres D'Amour" – 3:27
4. "Anthem No. II" – 0:58
5. "Air on 'A' Tape Loop" – 5:59

== Personnel ==
Sweet

- Brian Connolly – lead vocals (except as noted)
- Steve Priest – bass guitar, synthesiser voice, lead vocals ("California Nights"), backing vocals
- Andy Scott – guitar, synthesizer, lead vocals ("Dream On" & "Fountain"), backing vocals
- Mick Tucker – drums, percussion, backing vocals

Additional personnel

- Ronnie Asprey – brass
- Richard Harvey – baroque wind
- Stevie Lange – vocals ("Lettres D'Amour")
- Geoff Westley – keyboards, string arrangements
- Louis Austin – engineer
