= Desolation Boulevard =

1974 album by Sweet

- Original UK Cover

Studio album by The Sweet
- Released: 15 November 1974
- Recorded: 1973–1974
- Studios: Audio International Studios, London
- Genres: Hard rock; glam rock; heavy metal
- Length: 41:09
- Label: RCA Records
- Producer: Mike Chapman in association with Nicky Chinn

The Sweet chronology
Sweet Fanny Adams (1974)	Desolation Boulevard (1974)	The Sweet Singles Album (1975)

Singles from Desolation Boulevard
- 1. "The Six Teens" Released: 5 July 1974; 2. "Turn It Down" Released: 1 November 1974; 3. "Fox on the Run" Released: 7 March 1975

Professional ratings
Review scores
Source	Rating
AllMusic	4/5 stars
Christgau's Record Guide	B−
Soundblab	4/5 stars
The Vinyl District	A−

Desolation Boulevard is the third studio album by English glam rock band Sweet, released in the UK in November 1974. Two noticeably different versions of the album were released: one by RCA Records in Europe, and another by Capitol Records in the United States, Canada and Japan.

The RCA version contains the single "Turn It Down" and the original recording of "Fox on the Run." The Capitol version, released in the United States in May 1975, includes the band's 1973 hit single "The Ballroom Blitz" and the single version of "Fox on the Run." In the U.S., the album peaked at #25 on 25 October 1975.

Sweet's guitarist, Andy Scott, said of Desolation Boulevard: "Such diversity only proves that the band was never going to be just formulaic, giving this album a definitive place in Sweet history".

== Cover artwork ==
The album artwork was done by art design group Hipgnosis, famous for working with the likes of Pink Floyd, Genesis, The Alan Parsons Project, and Led Zeppelin. The background photo was shot near the entrance of a rock music club called Filthy McNasty's, located at 8852 Sunset Boulevard in West Hollywood, California. Today, it is the site of The Viper Room, which is where actor River Phoenix died of a drug overdose on Halloween morning in 1993.

The US front cover was slightly altered to add extra road signs and an altering of the album's title and band logo.

== Track listing ==
All songs written and composed by Brian Connolly, Steve Priest, Andy Scott and Mick Tucker except where noted.

=== RCA release ===
Side one

1. "The Six Teens" (Mike Chapman, Nicky Chinn) – 4:02
2. "Solid Gold Brass" – 5:33
3. "Turn It Down" (Chapman, Chinn) – 3:30
4. "Medusa" ("Medussa", on remastered CD editions 1999 and 2005) (Scott) – 4:45
5. "Lady Starlight" (Scott) – 3:12

Side two

1. "The Man with the Golden Arm" (Elmer Bernstein, Sylvia Fine) – 8:27
2. "Fox on the Run" – 4:47
3. "Breakdown" – 3:06
4. "My Generation" (Pete Townshend) – 3:59

==== Bonus tracks on 1997 reissue ====
10. "Burning" – 4:07
11. "Rock & Roll Disgrace" – 3:50

==== Bonus tracks on 1999 reissue ====
10. "I Wanna Be Committed" – 3:10
11. "Teenage Rampage" (single A-side) – 3:32

==== Bonus tracks on 2005 reissue ====
10. "Teenage Rampage" (Chapman, Chinn) – 3:52
11. "Own Up, Take a Look at Yourself" (B-side of "Teenage Rampage") – 3:58
12. "Burn on the Flame" (B-side of "The Six Teens") – 3:37
13. "Someone Else Will" (B-side of "Turn It Down") – 3:25
14. "Medusa" (home demo – previously unreleased) – 5:51
15. "Burn on the Flame" (home demo – previously unreleased) – 3:57
16. "I Wanna Be Committed" (Chapman, Chinn) – 3:10
17. "Fox on the Run" (7" version) – 3:24
18. "Miss Demeanor" (B-side of "Fox on the Run") – 3:17

== Capitol release ==
Desolation Boulevard
- Capitol version cover

Studio album by Sweet
- Released: May 1975
- Recorded: 1973–1975
- Genres: Hard rock; glam rock; heavy metal
- Length: 43:01
- Language: English
- Label: Capitol
- Producers: Mike Chapman, Nicky Chinn, Sweet

Singles from Desolation Boulevard
- 1. "Ballroom Blitz" Released: June 1975; 2. "Fox on the Run" Released: November 1975

The ten-song Capitol version of Desolation Boulevard was released in the United States and Canada in May 1975 and included several songs from their previous album Sweet Fanny Adams in addition to the "Ballroom Blitz" and "Fox on the Run" singles. The first side featured songs written by Nicky Chinn and Mike Chapman and the second side contained group compositions.

Side one

1. "Ballroom Blitz" (Chapman, Chinn) – 4:00
2. "The Six Teens" (stylized as "The 6-Teens") (Chapman, Chinn) – 4:04
3. "No You Don't" (Chapman, Chinn) – 4:36
4. "A.C.D.C." (Chapman, Chinn) – 3:28
5. "I Wanna Be Committed" (Chapman, Chinn) – 3:14

Side two

1. "Sweet F.A." (Scott, Tucker, Connolly, Priest) – 6:16
2. "Fox on the Run" (Scott, Tucker, Connolly, Priest) (single version) – 3:28
3. "Set Me Free" (Scott) – 3:59
4. "Into the Night" (Scott) – 4:25
5. "Solid Gold Brass" (Scott, Tucker, Connolly, Priest) (with guitar overdub) – 5:35

== Personnel ==
- Brian Connolly – lead vocals (except as noted)
- Steve Priest – bass, lead vocals (UK tracks 9, 18; US track 3), backing vocals
- Andy Scott – guitars, synthesizer, lead vocals (UK tracks 5, 6; US track 9), backing vocals
- Mick Tucker – drums, percussion, backing vocals

== Charts ==
=== Weekly charts ===
Chart (1975)	Peak position
Australian Albums (Kent Music Report)	13
Canada Top Albums/CDs (RPM)	5
Finnish Albums (Suomen virallinen lista)	9
German Albums (Offizielle Top 100)	9
New Zealand Albums (RMNZ)	17
Norwegian Albums (VG-lista)	17
Swedish Albums (Sverigetopplistan)	2
US Billboard 200	25

=== Year-end charts ===
Chart (1975)	Position
German Albums (Offizielle Top 100)	19
Chart (1976)	Position
Canada Top Albums/CDs (RPM)	42

== Certifications and sales ==
Region	Certification	Certified units/sales
Canada (Music Canada)	Gold	50,000^{^}
United Kingdom (BPI)	Silver	60,000^{^}
United States (RIAA)	Gold	500,000^{^}
^{^} Shipments figures based on certification alone.
