= Off the Record (Sweet album) =

Studio album by Sweet
- Released: March 1977; 8 April 1977 (US); October 1977 (Yugoslavia)
- Recorded: 4–8 October 1976
- Studio: Audio International Studios, London
- Genre: Hard rock; glam rock; heavy metal
- Length: 38:32 (original); 41:37 (US)
- Label: RCA; Capitol (US)
- Producer: Sweet

Sweet chronology
Give Us a Wink (1976)	Off the Record (1977)	The Golden Greats (1977)

Singles from Off the Record
- 1. "Lost Angels" Released: 14 October 1976 (Germany) 15 October 1976 October 1976 (France, Spain) November 1976 (Italy) 1977 (MX); 2. "Fever of Love" Released: February 1977 (Belgium, Italy, Spain) 25 February 1977 28 February 1977 (Germany) 13 April 1977 (US) June 1977 (Yugoslavia) 1977 (Japan); 3. "Funk it Up" Released: July 1977 26 August 1977 (US & MX); 4. "Stairway to the Stars" Released: 29 July 1977 August 1977 (Germany, Belgium, Spain)

Professional ratings
Review scores
Source	Rating
AllMusic	2/5 stars
Administrator	no rating

Off the Record is the fifth studio album by British glam rock band Sweet, released in March 1977 through RCA.

The band produced it with assistance from engineers Louis Austin and Nick Ryan. The album peaked at No. 151 on the Billboard 200 on 14 May 1977.

"Stairway to the Stars" was withheld from the RCA album release and later issued as a single as a follow-up to "Lost Angels" and "Fever of Love". All three singles proved to be commercial flops (except some countries like Sweden, Germany, Austria, South Africa, and Denmark, where all or some broke the top 10 and 20).

The German power metal act Gamma Ray covered "Lost Angels" on their 2013 Master of Confusion EP.

== Track listing ==
Credits adapted from the liner notes of Off the Record.

=== Original release ===
All tracks are written by Sweet (Brian Connolly, Steve Priest, Andy Scott and Mick Tucker).

Side one
No.	Title	Length
1.	"Fever of Love"	4:03
2.	"Lost Angels"	4:06
3.	"Midnight to Daylight"	3:34
4.	"Windy City"	7:26

Side two
No.	Title	Length
5.	"Live for Today"	3:19
6.	"She Gimme Lovin'"	4:08
7.	"Laura Lee"	4:18
8.	"Hard Times"	4:01
9.	"Funk It Up"	3:34
Total length:		38:32

==== Bonus tracks on 1990 reissue ====
10. "A Distinct Lack of Ancient" (B-side of 'Fever of Love') – 4:07
11. "Stairway to the Stars" – 3:05
12. "Why Don't You Do It to Me" (B-side of 'Stairway to the Stars') – 3:11

==== Bonus tracks on 1999 reissue ====
10. "A Distinct Lack of Ancient" – 4:09
11. "Why Don't You Do It to Me" – 3:14

==== Bonus tracks on 2005 reissue ====
10. "A Distinct Lack of Ancient" – 4:07
11. "Funk It Up" (disco mix – US B-side of 'Funk It Up') – 5:27
12. "Stairway to the Stars" – 3:03
13. "Why Don't You Do It to Me" – 3:13
14. "Midnight to Daylight" (extended version) – 4:09
15. "Lost Angels" (demo version) – 3:46
16. "She Gimme Lovin'" (alternative version – previously unreleased) – 4:06
17. "Hard Times" (alternative version – previously unreleased) – 4:40

== US Track listing ==
Side one

1. "Fever of Love" (different intro) – 3:59
2. "Lost Angels" – 4:02
3. "Midnight to Daylight" – 3:30
4. "Laura Lee" – 4:16
5. "Windy City" – 7:27

Side two

1. "Stairway to the Stars" (additional track) – 3:05
2. "Live for Today" (clean version) – 3:22
3. "Funk It Up (David's Song)" (same as RCA version) – 3:33
4. "Hard Times" – 4:00
5. "She Gimme Lovin'" – 4:04

Unlike the RCA issue, the Capitol cover featured the album title.

== Personnel ==
Credits adapted from the liner notes of Off the Record.

Sweet

- Brian Connolly – lead vocals
- Steve Priest – bass guitar, harmonica (track 8), lead vocals (track 7) and backing vocals (except track 5)
- Andy Scott – all guitars, keyboards, synthesizers & vocals (except track 5)
- Mick Tucker – all percussion (drums) & vocals (except track 5)

Production

- Louie Austin & Nick Ryan — engineers
- David Stanford — photography by Andy Scott
- Pennie Smith — photography by Brian Connolly
- Alexander Agor — photography by Steve Priest
- Jan Frewer — photography by Mick Tucker
- Recorded in October 1976 at Audio International Studios
- Mixed in January 1977 at Kingsway Recorders, London
