= The Six Teens (song) =

- German release picture sleeve

Single by Sweet

from the album Desolation Boulevard
- B-side: "Burn on the Flame"
- Released: 5 July 1974
- Recorded: 1974
- Genre: Glam rock
- Length: 4:01
- Label: RCA
- Songwriters: Nicky Chinn, Mike Chapman
- Producers: Phil Wainman, Nicky Chinn, Mike Chapman

Sweet singles chronology
| "Teenage Rampage" (1974) | "The Six Teens" (1974) | "Turn It Down" (1974) |

"The Six Teens" (1974) (often spelled as "The Sixteens") is a song by English glam rock band Sweet, written by Nicky Chinn and Mike Chapman, appearing on Sweet's album Desolation Boulevard. The song was Sweet's first single simply as "Sweet" (previously, the band was known as The Sweet). The B-side is the band composition "Burn on the Flame".

== Background ==
The song references six teenagers growing up in the revolutionary rhetoric of the 1960s. The song was the penultimate single written by Chinn and Chapman for the band and the last on which long-time producer Phil Wainman assisted.

The song features softer acoustic verses contrasted with heavier electric guitar-based choruses and was regarded as something of a significant departure from the band's glam rock sound heard on previous singles. Guitarist Andy Scott, when introducing the song in his current band's live show, often states he regards it as Chinn and Chapman's best work.

== Chart positions ==
The single reached the top 10 in several European countries, and was the band's 10th #1 in Denmark.

| Chart (1974) | Peak position |
|---|---|
| Australia | 48 |
| Austria | 9 |
| Denmark | 1 |
| Finland | 8 |
| Germany | 4 |
| Ireland | 15 |
| Netherlands | 7 |
| Norway | 7 |
| Switzerland | 6 |
| United Kingdom | 9 |

== Personnel ==
- Brian Connolly - lead vocals
- Steve Priest - bass guitar, backing vocals, additional lead vocals
- Andy Scott - guitars, backing vocals
- Mick Tucker - drums, backing vocals

== Legacy ==
The Vinyl District referred to the song as "a bona fide lost glam classic".
