= Action (Sweet song) =

1975 song by Sweet

Single by Sweet

from the album Strung Up and Give Us a Wink
- B-side: "Sweet F.A." (Europe); "Medussa" (US)
- Released: July 1975 (UK)
- Recorded: 1975
- Genre: Hard rock
- Length: 3:18 (single version); 3:44 (album version); 3:35 (Strung Up edit)
- Label: RCA (Europe); Capitol (US)
- Songwriters: Andy Scott; Brian Connolly; Steve Priest; Mick Tucker
- Producer: Sweet

Sweet singles chronology
| "Fox on the Run" (1975) | "Action" (1975) | "The Lies in Your Eyes" (1976) |

"Action" is a song by English glam rock band Sweet. It was recorded at Ian Gillan's Kingsway Studios in London and released in 1975. Slightly different versions appear on the albums Strung Up and Give Us a Wink.

The single reached No. 15 in the UK in July 1975, and went to the Top 40 in the US the following year.

== Composition ==
The lyrics refer to Sweet's negative treatment as pop stars, particularly by the music press, and to the demands of the music industry. The track features a masked "backwards vocal" with the words "You kiss my arse".

== Charts ==
=== Weekly charts ===
| Chart (1975–1976) | Peak position |
|---|---|
| Australia (Kent Music Report) | 4 |
| Austria (Ö3 Austria Top 40) | 3 |
| Belgium (Ultratop 50 Flanders) | 8 |
| Belgium (Ultratop 50 Wallonia) | 19 |
| Canada Top Singles (RPM) | 5 |
| Ireland (IRMA) | 7 |
| Netherlands (Single Top 100) | 5 |
| New Zealand (Recorded Music NZ) | 12 |
| Norway (VG-lista) | 2 |
| Sweden (Sverigetopplistan) | 2 |
| Switzerland (Schweizer Hitparade) | 4 |
| UK Singles (OCC) | 15 |
| US Billboard Hot 100 | 20 |
| West Germany (GfK) | 2 |

=== Year-end charts ===
| Chart (1975) | Position |
|---|---|
| Australia (Kent Music Report) | 37 |

== Def Leppard version ==
"Action"

Single by Def Leppard

from the album Retro Active
- B-side: "She's Too Tough" (Joe's demo); "Miss You in a Heartbeat" (Phil's demo)
- Released: 3 January 1994 (UK)
- Recorded: 1992–1993
- Genre: Hard rock; glam metal
- Length: 3:41
- Label: Bludgeon Riffola
- Songwriters: Andy Scott; Brian Connolly; Steve Priest; Mick Tucker
- Producer: Def Leppard

Def Leppard singles chronology
| "Miss You in a Heartbeat" (1993) | "Action" (1994) | "When Love & Hate Collide" (1995) |

In 1993, English rock band Def Leppard covered "Action" on their compilation album Retro Active (1993). "Andy [Scott] said that our version of 'Action' was the best cover of a Sweet song he'd ever heard," proclaimed singer Joe Elliott. The original 1992 recording, before guitarist Vivian Campbell joined the band, was released as a B-side to "Make Love Like a Man"; the version featured on Retro Active and released as a single features a newly-recorded snare drum from drummer Rick Allen and additional backing vocals from Campbell and P.J. Smith. The single charted at number 14 on UK Singles Chart.

The accompanying music video was directed by Phil Tuckett from NFL entertainment. The approximate shooting date was between June and December 1993; in Sheffield, Ottawa, and Joe Elliott's home in Ireland. The band 'discovered' the masked backwards vocal on the original track and refer to it on the CD single cover.

Leppard's version reappeared on a special edition of their 2006 album Yeah!.

=== Track listing ===
| No. | Title | Writer(s) | Length |
|---|---|---|---|
| 1. | "Action" | Andy Scott, Brian Connolly, Steve Priest, Mick Tucker | 3:41 |
| 2. | "She's Too Tough" (Joe's demo) | Joe Elliot | 3:42 |
| 3. | "Miss You in a Heartbeat" (Phil's demo) | Phil Collen | 5:55 |

=== Charts ===
| Chart (1994) | Peak position |
|---|---|
| UK Singles (OCC) | 14 |
| UK Airplay (Music Week) | 18 |

== Other cover versions ==
Scorpions (as 'The Hunters') released it in German translation as "Wenn es richtig losgeht" on the B-side of the single "Fuchs geh' voran" (a translation of "Fox on the Run", also by Sweet)

Burning Airlines recorded a cover during the sessions for their second album Identikit

Guitarist Steve Stevens recorded a cover version for his 1989 album Atomic Playboys.

Hard rock duo Nelson did a cover of this song as well on their Imaginator album.
