= Turn It Down (Sweet song) =

Single by The Sweet

from the album Desolation Boulevard
- B-side: "Someone Else Will"
- Released: 1 November 1974
- Recorded: 1973
- Genre: Hard rock
- Length: 3:30
- Label: RCA
- Songwriters: Mike Chapman, Nicky Chinn
- Producer: Mike Chapman in association with Nicky Chinn

The Sweet singles chronology
"The Six Teens" (1974)	"Turn It Down" (1974)	"Peppermint Twist" (1974)

"Turn It Down" is a song by English glam rock band the Sweet released in 1974 as the second single from their third album Desolation Boulevard. The song was removed from the US version of Desolation Boulevard, along with two other songs, "Breakdown," and "Medussa. In the UK, the single reached No. 41 on the charts (their first single to miss the top 40 since "Get on the Line" (1970), which missed the chart altogether), but fared better in Europe, reaching the top five in Norway and Germany.

== Composition ==
"Turn It Down" is a hard rock and proto-glam metal song, more in-line with the band's live sound than their previous singles.

== Controversy ==
"Turn It Down" was banned by the BBC due to its subjective nature, and the lyric "I can’t take no more of that Godawful sound, so for God’s sake turn it down."

== Personnel ==
- Brian Connolly – lead vocals
- Steve Priest – bass, backing vocals
- Andy Scott – guitars, backing vocals
- Mick Tucker – drums, percussion, backing vocals

== Charts ==
Chart (1974)	Peak position
Austria (Ö3 Austria Top 40)	14
Belgium (Ultratop 50 Wallonia)	33
Norway (VG-lista)	4
UK Singles (Official Charts)	41
West Germany (GfK)	4
