= Fox on the Run (Sweet song) =

1975 song by Sweet

Single by Sweet

from the album Desolation Boulevard
- B-side: "Miss Demeanor" (Europe); "Burn on the Flame" (US)
- Released: 7 March 1975
- Recorded: 1974
- Genre: Glam rock; hard rock; power pop
- Length: 3:24
- Label: RCA (Europe); Capitol (US)
- Songwriters: Brian Connolly; Steve Priest; Andy Scott; Mick Tucker
- Producer: Sweet

Sweet singles chronology
| "Peppermint Twist" (1974) | "Fox on the Run" (1975) | "Action" (1975) |

Music video
- "Fox on the Run" on YouTube

"Fox on the Run" is a song by English glam rock band Sweet, first recorded in 1974. It was the first Sweet single with the A-side written by the band, rather than by producers Nicky Chinn and Mike Chapman, and was their 14th single overall. The song became the best charting single in Australia in 1975, with six weeks at number one. It also returned the group to the UK top ten after the failure of their previous single "Turn It Down" to make the top 40.

Two versions were recorded by Sweet. The original version was produced by Mike Chapman in association with Nicky Chinn on the European version of the 1974 album Desolation Boulevard. Sweet also recorded and produced a more pop-oriented rendition as a 7" single in 1975, which is the more familiar version of the song. The 1975 single was included on the Capitol Records version of Desolation Boulevard.

The song's inclusion in the trailer for Guardians of the Galaxy Vol. 2 led to a number one spot on the iTunes Rock Chart in late 2016.

== Background ==
"Fox" being slang for an attractive woman, the lyrics are apparently about one of the band's groupies; Bomp! called the song "a definitive hard-rock bubblegum record" and "one of the last glitter classics".

== Chart performance ==
=== Weekly charts ===
| Chart (1975–1976) | Peak position |
|---|---|
| Australia (Kent Music Report) | 1 |
| Belgium (Ultratop 50 Flanders) | 4 |
| Belgium (Ultratop 50 Wallonia) | 9 |
| Austria (Ö3 Austria Top 40) | 3 |
| Canada Top Singles (RPM) | 2 |
| Denmark (Tracklisten) | 1 |
| Finland | 10 |
| Ireland (IRMA) | 2 |
| Netherlands (Single Top 100) | 2 |
| New Zealand (Recorded Music NZ) | 3 |
| Norway (VG-lista) | 2 |
| South Africa (Springbok Radio) | 1 |
| Sweden (Sverigetopplistan) | 10 |
| Switzerland (Schweizer Hitparade) | 3 |
| UK Singles (Official Charts) | 2 |
| U.S. Billboard Hot 100 | 5 |
| U.S. Cash Box Top 100 | 5 |
| West Germany (GfK) | 1 |

=== Year-end charts ===
| Chart (1975) | Rank |
|---|---|
| Australia (Kent Music Report) | 1 |
| Netherlands | 19 |
| New Zealand | 12 |
| South Africa | 2 |
| UK | 37 |

| Chart (1976) | Rank |
|---|---|
| Canada | 37 |
| US Billboard Hot 100 | 76 |
| US Cash Box | 63 |

== Certifications ==
| Region | Certification | Certified units/sales |
|---|---|---|
| Canada (Music Canada) | Gold | 75,000^{^} |
| New Zealand (RMNZ) | Gold | 15,000^{‡} |
| United Kingdom (BPI) | Silver | 250,000^{^} |
| United States (RIAA) | Gold | 1,000,000^{^} |
^{^} Shipments figures based on certification alone.

== Personnel ==
- Brian Connolly – lead vocals
- Steve Priest – bass, lead vocal, backing vocals
- Andy Scott – guitars, synthesizer, backing vocals
- Mick Tucker – drums, percussion, backing vocals

== Scorpions version ==
"Fuchs geh' voran"

Single by Scorpions
- Released: 1975
- Genre: Hard rock
- Length: 3:17
- Songwriters: Brian Connolly, Steve Priest; Andy Scott, Mick Tucker

"Fuchs geh' voran" is a German cover version of the song with lyrics about a fox being chased by hunters to sell its fur. It was released as a single in 1975 by the German rock band Scorpions as The Hunters. The B-side also features a German cover version of another Sweet song, "Action", as "Wenn es richtig losgeht".

== See also ==
- List of number-one singles in Australia during the 1970s
- List of number-one hits of 1975 (Germany)
