= Mud discography =

- Studio albums: 7
- Compilation albums: 10
- Singles: 36

This article is the discography of all the music produced by English glam rock band Mud.

== Albums ==
=== Studio albums ===
Year	Title	Details	Peak chart positions						Certifications
Year	Title	Details	UK	AUT	FIN	GER	NL	NOR	Certifications
1974	Mud Rock	Released: 17 September 1974; Label: Rak; Formats: LP, MC, 8-track	8	9	3	16	3	—	BPI: Gold
1975	Mud Rock Vol. II	Released: 20 June 1975; Label: Rak; Formats: LP, MC, 8-track	6	—	5	34	4	19	BPI: Gold
1975	Use Your Imagination	Released: December 1975; Label: Private Stock, Philips; Formats: LP, MC	33	—	8	—	17	—	BPI: Silver
1976	It's Better Than Working	Released: November 1976; Label: Private Stock, Philips; Formats: LP, MC	—	—	—	—	—	—	
1978	Rock On	Released: November 1978; Label: RCA Victor; Formats: LP, MC	—	—	—	—	—	—	
1979	As You Like It	Released: October 1979; Label: RCA; Formats: LP, MC	—	—	—	—	—	—	
1982	Mud Featuring Les Gray	Released: 1982; Label: Runaway; Formats: LP; Germany-only release	—	—	—	—	—	—	
"—" denotes releases that did not chart or were not released in that territory.

=== Compilation albums ===
Year	Title	Details	Peak chart positions			Certifications
Year	Title	Details	UK	GER	NL	Certifications
1975	Mud's Greatest Hits	Released: October 1975; Label: Rak; Formats: LP, MC, 8-track	25	43	—	BPI: Silver
1977	Mud Pack	Released: August 1977; Label: Private Stock; Formats: LP, MC	—	—	—	
1990	Let's Have a Party – The Best of Mud	Released: March 1990; Label: EMI; Formats: CD, LP, MC	—	—	—	
1993	Mud is Back	Released: 1993; Label: EVA; Formats: CD; Netherlands-only release	—	—	48	
1997	The Singles '67–'78	Released: 3 November 1997; Label: Repertoire; Formats: 2xCD; Germany-only release	—	—	—	
1998	The Very Best of Mud	Released: 6 April 1998; Label: EMI; Formats: CD, MC	—	—	—	
2000	Greatest Hits	Released: 15 May 2000; Label: EMI; Formats: CD	—	—	—	
2004	A's, B's & Rarities	Released: 2 December 2004; Label: EMI Gold; Formats: CD	—	—	96	
2004	Time and Time Again – The Private Stock Collection	Released: 6 December 2004; Label: Castle Music; Formats: 2xCD	—	—	—	
2007	Off the Rak – The Singles 1975–79	Released: 22 January 2007; Label: 7T's; Formats: CD	—	—	—	
"—" denotes releases that did not chart or were not released in that territory.

== Singles ==
Year	Titles (A-side, B-side)	Peak chart positions										Certifications	Album (A-side)
Year	Titles (A-side, B-side)	UK	AUS	AUT	BE (FLA)	BE (WA)	FIN	GER	IRE	NL	NZ	Certifications	Album (A-side)
1967	"Flower Power" b/w "You're My Mother"	—	—	—	—	—	—	—	—	—	—		Non-album singles
1968	"Up the Airy Mountain" b/w "The Latter Days"	—	—	—	—	—	—	—	—	—	—		Non-album singles
1969	"Shangri-La" b/w "House on the Hill"	—	—	—	—	—	—	—	—	—	—		Non-album singles
1970	"Jumping Jehosaphat" b/w "Won't Let It Go"	—	—	—	—	—	—	—	—	—	—		Non-album singles
1973	"Crazy" b/w "Do You Love Me"	12	—	—	—	—	—	40	—	—	—		Non-album singles
1973	"Hypnosis" b/w "Last Tango in London"	16	57	—	—	—	—	—	—	—	—		Non-album singles
1973	"Dyna-mite" b/w "Do It All Over Again"	4	61	—	2	3	19	37	9	1	—	BPI: Silver	Mud Rock; Volume 1
1974	"Tiger Feet" b/w "Mr. Bagatelle"	1	43	6	1	3	12	6	1	1	18	BPI: Gold	Mud Rock; Volume 1
1974	"The Cat Crept In" b/w "Morning"	2	—	12	3	4	—	5	5	1	—	BPI: Silver	Mud Rock; Volume 1
1974	"Rocket" b/w "The Ladies"	6	—	3	3	4	7	8	7	3	—		Mud Rock; Volume 1
1974	"In the Mood" (released under the name Dum) b/w "Watching the Clock"	—	—	—	—	—	—	—	—	—	—		Mud Rock; Volume 1
1974	"Lonely This Christmas" b/w "I Can't Stand It"	1	—	—	1	1	13	—	1	1	—	BPI: Platinum	Non-album single
1975	"The Secrets That You Keep" b/w "Still Watching the Clock"	3	28	—	3	12	20	28	3	4	—	BPI: Silver	Mud Rock; Volume 2
1975	"Oh Boy" b/w "Watching the Clock"	1	58	5	3	17	22	2	1	6	29	BPI: Silver	Mud Rock; Volume 2
1975	"Moonshine Sally" b/w "Bye Bye Johnny"	10	—	—	4	26	—	8	9	8	—		Mud's Greatest Hits
1975	"One Night" b/w "Shake, Rattle and Roll/See You Later Alligator (Medley)"	32	—	—	7	22	—	34	—	27	—		Mud Rock; Volume 2
1975	"L'L'Lucy" b/w "My Love Is Your Love"	10	—	—	1	13	6	19	9	1	—		Use Your Imagination
1975	"Show Me You're a Woman" b/w "Don't You Know"	8	—	—	16	29	—	43	2	26	—		Use Your Imagination
1976	"Use Your Imagination" (Italy-only release) b/w "My Love Is Your Love"	—	—	—	—	—	—	—	—	—	—		Use Your Imagination
1976	"Hula Love" (Continental Europe-only release) b/w "Dyna-mite/The Cat Crept In/Tiger Feet (Medley)"	—	—	—	—	—	—	38	—	—	—		Mud Rock; Volume 2
1976	"Living Doll" (Germany-only release) b/w "Blue Moon"	—	—	—	—	—	—	—	—	—	—		Mud Rock; Volume 2
1976	"Let's Have A Party" (Germany-only release) b/w "I Love How You Love Me"	—	—	—	—	—	—	—	—	—	—		Mud Rock; Volume 2
1976	"Shake It Down" b/w "Laugh Live Love"	12	—	—	13	31	—	45	—	12	—		Non-album single
1976	"Nite on the Tiles" b/w "Time and Again"	— (Note: This single did not enter the UK Singles Chart, but did reach number 5 in the UK Star Breakers Chart.)	—	—	30	47	—	—	—	28	—		It's Better Than Working
1976	"Lean on Me" b/w "Grecian Lament"	7	—	—	—	—	—	—	6	—	—	BPI: Silver	Non-album single
1977	"Slow Talking Boy" b/w "Let Me Out"	— (Note: This single did not enter the UK Singles Chart, but did reach number 8 in the UK Star Breakers Chart.)	—	—	—	—	—	—	—	—	—		Rock On
1977	"Just Try (A Little Tenderness)" b/w "Gives You the Good Times Now"	—	98	—	—	—	—	—	—	—	—		Non-album single
1977	"Beating Round the Bush" b/w "Under the Moon of Love"	—	—	—	—	—	—	—	—	—	—		Mud Pack
1978	"Cut Across Shorty" b/w "We've Got to Know"	— (Note: This single did not enter the UK Singles Chart, but did reach number 58 in the Record Business Singles Chart.)	—	—	—	—	—	—	—	—	—		Rock On
1978	"Drift Away" b/w "Let Me Get (Close to You)"	— (Note: This single did not enter the UK Singles Chart, but did reach number 84 in the Record Business Singles Chart.)	—	—	—	—	—	—	—	—	—		Rock On
1978	"Why Do Fools Fall in Love"/"Book of Love" b/w "Run Don't Walk"	—	—	—	—	—	—	—	—	—	—		As You Like It
1979	"You'll Like It" b/w "Can't Stop"	—	—	—	—	—	—	—	—	—	—		As You Like It
1979	"Drop Everything and Run" b/w "Taking the Easy Way Out"	—	—	—	—	—	—	—	—	—	—		Non-album single
1980	"Rico" (released under the name Ring) b/w "Make a Buck"	—	—	—	—	—	—	—	—	—	—		Non-album single
1983	"Lipstick on Your Collar" b/w "Don't Ever Change"	—	—	—	—	—	—	—	—	—	—		Mud Featuring Les Gray
1985	"Lonely This Christmas" (reissue) b/w "I Can't Stand It"	61	—	—	—	—	—	—	—	—	—		Non-album single
"—" denotes releases that did not chart or were not released in that territory.
