= List of Dutch Top 40 number-one singles of 1974 =

These hits topped the Dutch Top 40 in 1974.

Issue Date	Song	Artist(s)	Reference
5 January	" 't Is weer voorbij die mooie zomer"	Gerard Cox	
12 January	" 't Is weer voorbij die mooie zomer"	Gerard Cox	
19 January	"Dirty Ol' Man"	The Three Degrees	
26 January	"Dirty Ol' Man"	The Three Degrees	
2 February	"Dirty Ol' Man"	The Three Degrees	
9 February	Den Uyl is in den olie"	Vader Abraham & Boer Koekoek	
16 February	Den Uyl is in den olie"	Vader Abraham & Boer Koekoek	
23 February	"Dynamite"	Mud	
2 March	"Dynamite"	Mud	
9 March	"Dynamite"	Mud	
16 March	"Dynamite"	Mud	
23 March	"Dynamite"	Mud	
30 March	"Tiger Feet"	Mud	
6 April	"Tiger Feet"	Mud	
13 April	"Tiger Feet"	Mud	
20 April	"Be my day"	The Cats	
27 April	"Be my day"	The Cats	
4 May	"Be my day"	The Cats	
11 May	"Be my day"	The Cats	
18 May	"Be my day"	The Cats	
25 May	"Be my day"	The Cats	
1 June	"De wilde boerndochtere"	Ivan Heylen	
8 June	"De wilde boerndochtere"	Ivan Heylen	
15 June	"De wilde boerndochtere"	Ivan Heylen	
22 June	"De wilde boerndochtere"	Ivan Heylen	
29 June	"Sugar Baby Love"	The Rubettes	
6 July	"Sugar Baby Love"	The Rubettes	
13 July	"Sugar Baby Love"	The Rubettes	
20 July	"Sugar Baby Love"	The Rubettes	
27 July	"Sugar Baby Love"	The Rubettes	
3 August	"Sugar Baby Love"	The Rubettes	
10 August	"Sugar Baby Love"	The Rubettes	
17 August	"Rock Your Baby"	George McCrae	
24 August	"Rock Your Baby"	George McCrae	
31 August	"Rock Your Baby"	George McCrae	
7 September	"Rock Your Baby"	George McCrae	
14 September	"Rock Your Baby"	George McCrae	
21 September	"Rock Your Baby"	George McCrae	
28 September	"Rock Your Baby"	George McCrae	
5 October	"The Wall Street Shuffle"	10cc	
12 October	"Kung Fu Fighting"	Carl Douglas	
19 October	"Kung Fu Fighting"	Carl Douglas	
26 October	"Kung Fu Fighting"	Carl Douglas	
2 November	"Kung Fu Fighting"	Carl Douglas	
9 November	"Kung Fu Fighting"	Carl Douglas	
16 November	"Kung Fu Fighting"	Carl Douglas	
23 November	"Sing a song of love"	George Baker Selection	
30 November	"Sing a song of love"	George Baker Selection	
7 December	"Sing a song of love"	George Baker Selection	
14 December	"Long Tall Glasses"	Leo Sayer	
21 December	"Lonely This Christmas"	Mud	
28 December	No Top 40 released		

== See also ==
- 1974 in music
