= Never Too Young to Rock =

1975 British film by Dennis Abey

Never Too Young To Rock
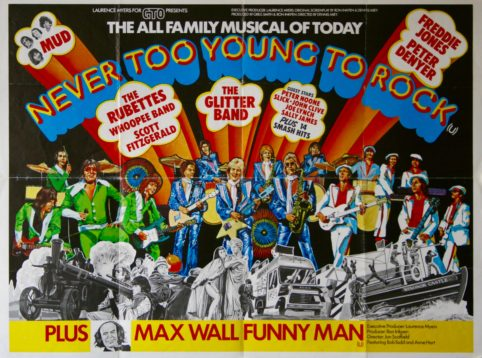
- UK Quad Poster
- Directed by: Dennis Abey
- Starring: Peter Denyer; Freddie Jones; The Glitter Band; The Rubettes; Mud
- Distributed by: GTO Films
- Release date: 6 June 1975
- Running time: 101 minutes
- Country: United Kingdom
- Language: English

Never Too Young To Rock is a 1975 British musical comedy film directed by Dennis Abey and starring Peter Denyer and Freddie Jones. It features musical artists popular at the time of release including The Glitter Band, The Rubettes, Mud, Scott Fitzgerald, Slik and Bob Kerr's Whoopee Band.

== Plot ==
Rock music has been banned from television and our two heroes scour the country in their detector van for bands to perform at a concert, aided and hindered by a likely assortment of people.

== Cast ==
- Peter Denyer as Hero
- Freddie Jones as Mr. Rockbottom
- Sheila Steafel as café proprietress
- Joe Lynch as Russian soldier
- John Clive as Bandsman Milligan
- Peter Noone as Army Captain
- Bob Kerr's Whoopee Band as themselves
- Joe Dunne as Mr Merlin
- Scott Fitzgerald as himself
- The Glitter Band as themselves
- Sally James as herself
- Robert Longden as man
- Mud as themselves
- Nosher Powell as football fan
- Peter Powell as himself
- The Rubettes as themselves
- Midge Ure and Slik as themselves (uncredited)

== Soundtrack ==
The soundtrack album released on GTO Records (GTO GTLP 004) peaked in the UK chart at number 30 in August 1975.

Three tracks by Mud ("Dyna-Mite", "Tiger Feet", "The Cat Crept In") are heard in the movie but are not on the album.

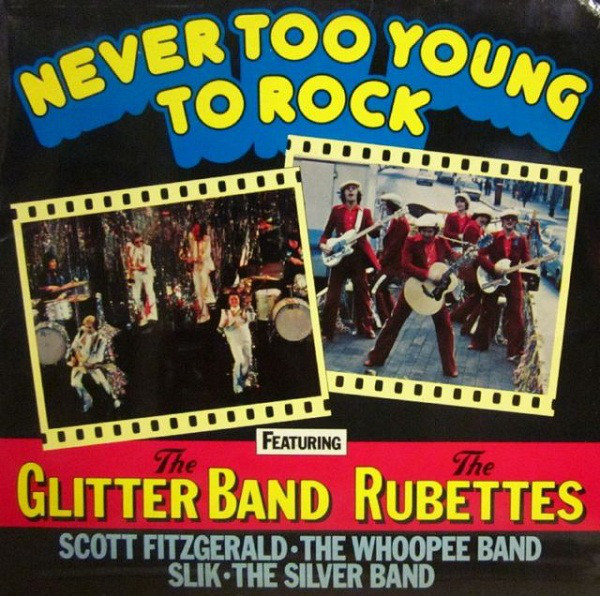
Soundtrack Album

A1 – Scott Fitzgerald, "Never Too Young To Rock"

A2 – The Rubettes, "Sugar Baby Love"

A3 – The Glitter Band, "Let's Get Together Again"

A4 – The Silver Band, "Something Old, Something New"

A5 – Slik, "The Boogiest Band In Town"

A6 – The Glitter Band, "Shout It Out"

A7 – The Rubettes, "Tonight"

B1 – The Glitter Band. "Angel Face"

B2 – Bob Kerr's Whoopee Band, "5,000 Year Old Rock"

B3 – The Rubettes, "Juke Box Jive"

B4 – The Glitter Band, "Just For You"

B5 – The Silver Band, "Quadrangular March"

B6 – The Cast, "Never Too Young To Rock"

== Reception ==
The Monthly Film Bulletin wrote: "GTOs ambitious sequel to last year's Remember Me This Way, which promoted the talents of Gary Glitter. Here, a vast army of pop performers are promoted, though the movie curiously only allows them to come into their own during the final half-hour. For the rest of the time, comedy leads Peter Denyer and Freddie Jones fool about with an indifferent script, directed in a whirlwind manner, with a few snatches of song here and there to whet the audience's appetite. Once the silly plot is tucked away, the stage is all clear for a glorified version of Top of the Pops: in a kitsch wonderland of shimmering fronds, balloons and decorated flowers, the glittering bands pound out their recent hits – and amongst the teenybopper audience Mr. Rockbottom, the adults' identification figure, follows the title number with his tuba."
