= Mud Rock =

Studio album by Mud
- Released: 17 September 1974
- Recorded: 1973–1974
- Studios: Audio International, London
- Genres: Glam rock, rock and roll, pop rock
- Label: RAK
- Producers: Mike Chapman, Nicky Chinn

Mud chronology
Mud Rock (1974)	Mud Rock Vol. II (1975)

Singles from Mud Rock
- 1. "Dyna-mite" Released: 5 October 1973; 2. "Tiger Feet" Released: 4 January 1974; 3. "The Cat Crept In" Released: 8 April 1974; 4. "Rocket" Released: 19 July 1974; 5. "In the Mood" Released: 28 July 1974

Mud Rock is the debut studio album by the English glam rock band Mud. It was released on 17 September 1974 by RAK Records and produced by the songwriting and production team of Nicky Chinn and Mike Chapman.

The album combines Chinn and Chapman songs with covers of 1950s and early 1960s rock and roll and pop standards. It reached number 8 on the UK Albums Chart and spent 35 weeks on the chart. The British Phonographic Industry (BPI) certified the album gold in March 1975.

== Background and recording ==
In late 1972, the band attracted the attention of songwriting and production duo Nicky Chinn and Mike Chapman, who secured them a new recording deal with RAK Records. Five top 20 singles followed, including the number 1 "Tiger Feet" in January 1974.

The album was recorded at Audio International Studios in London, with Mike Chapman and Nicky Chinn producing and Pete Coleman engineering the sessions. In a 1975 interview with Beat Instrumental bassist Ray Stiles said the album was recorded and mixed in five days. To cultivate an informal, live-in-the-studio atmosphere, the tracks are interspersed with pre-recorded background party chatter, clinking glasses, and spoken-word introductions by presenter Geoffrey from Radio Trent.

Mud Rock contained no original compositions by the band members. In an April 1974 interview with Beat Instrumental, drummer Dave Mount explained that the group had abandoned an initial plan to record an album split equally between their own songs and Chinn and Chapman compositions, opting instead to recreate their stage act with a collection of older rock and roll songs. The band re-recorded three of their recent hits – "Dyna-mite", "The Cat Crept In" and "Tiger Feet" – as a single medley rather than including the original single versions.

== Release and commercial performance ==
Mud Rock was released in the United Kingdom in September 1974 by RAK Records, on LP, cassette and 8-track cartridge. It was also issued in several European markets, including Belgium and the Netherlands on RAK, Germany through EMI Electrola, and Yugoslavia through Jugoton.

The album entered the UK Albums Chart on 28 September 1974 and reached a peak position of number eight. It spent 35 weeks on the chart. Mud Rock also reached number nine in Austria, number 16 in West Germany and number three in the Netherlands.

The album received a gold disc award in the United Kingdom. A contemporary report in Music Week, published on 8 April 1978, listed Mud Rock among the band's three RAK albums to have achieved gold disc status.

== Critical reception ==
Professional ratings
Review scores
Source	Rating
Record Mirror	Positive
AllMusic	4/5 stars

In a contemporary review for Record Mirror, P. H. praised Mud Rock for its "raunchy earthy sound" and considered its selection of rock and roll material "quite impeccable". The reviewer also approved of the simulated party atmosphere created by overdubbing crowd noises, describing the production approach as a "veritable master stroke". However, they suggested that the band could move beyond its cabaret leanings and stage persona.

In a retrospective review for AllMusic, Dave Thompson described Mud Rock as capturing the musical atmosphere of England in 1974, when glam rock was increasingly embracing the rock and roll revival. He noted that the album's combination of the band's hits and vintage covers, together with the simulated party atmosphere, created an energetic listening experience. Although he thought that the music was predictable, he considered the record's enthusiasm and excitement irresistible.

== Track listing ==
All tracks written by Nicky Chinn and Mike Chapman, except where noted.

Side one
No.	Title	Writer(s)	Length
1.	"Rocket"		4:32
2.	"Do You Love Me / Sha-La-La-La-Lee"	Berry Gordy / Kenny Lynch, Mort Shuman	3:12
3.	"Running Bear"	J. P. Richardson	4:19
4.	"The Hippy Hippy Shake"	Chan Romero	2:31
5.	"Shake, Rattle and Roll / See You Later, Alligator"	Jesse Stone / Bobby Charles	4:00

Side two
No.	Title	Writer(s)	Length
6.	"Dyna-mite / The Cat Crept In / Tiger Feet (Medley)"		5:03
7.	"The End of the World"	Arthur Kent, Sylvia Dee	4:02
8.	"Blue Moon"	Richard Rodgers, Lorenz Hart	2:20
9.	"In the Mood"	Joe Garland, Andy Razaf	3:37
10.	"Bye Bye Johnny"	Chuck Berry	5:28

== Personnel ==
Credits adapted from the original LP liner notes.

Mud

- Les Gray – lead vocals
- Rob Davis – guitar, vocals
- Ray Stiles – bass, vocals
- Dave Mount – drums, vocals

Production

- Mike Chapman – producer
- Nicky Chinn – producer
- Pete Coleman – audio engineer
- Gered Mankowitz – photography
- Chris Blair – lacquer cutting

== Charts ==
Chart (1974–1975)	Peak position
Austrian Albums (Ö3 Austria)	9
Finnish Albums (Suomen virallinen albumilista)	3
German Albums (Offizielle Top 100)	16
Dutch Albums (Album Top 100)	3
UK Albums (Official Charts)	8

== Certifications ==
Country	Certification	Date
United Kingdom (BPI)	Gold	31 March 1975

== Release history ==
- 17 September 1974 - Original LP (SRAK 508), cassette (TC SRAK 508), and 8-track cartridge (8X SRAK 508)
- 1976 - Double LP reissue with Mud Rock Vol. II (RAK 52446)
- 1998 - CD 2 in 1 reissue with Mud Rock Vol. II (BGO Records BGOCD415)
- 2011 - CD reissue with 7 bonus tracks (7T's Records GLAM CD 117)
- 2012 - CD 2 in 1 reissue with Mud Rock Vol. II (EMI R&R121111)
