= Just for the Record =

Just for the Record may refer to:

- "Just for the Record" (Randall and Hopkirk (Deceased)), a 1969 episode of the British television series
- Just for the Record (Barbara Mandrell album), 1979
- Just for the Record (Ray Stevens album), 1976
- Just for the Record..., a 1991 box set by Barbra Streisand
- Just for the Record, a 2002 autobiography by Geri Halliwell
- "Just for the Record", a 2007 song by Jordin Sparks from her self-titled album
