= Dinny Powell =

British actor, boxer and stuntman

- Powell in The Avengers, 1967
- Born: Dennis Sydney Powell; 27 July 1932; London, England
- Died: 6 June 2023 (aged 90)
- Occupations: Actor, stuntman
- Relatives: Nosher Powell (brother); Greg Powell (nephew)
- Boxing career
- Nationality: United Kingdom
- Weight: Heavyweight

Boxing record
- Total fights: 22
- Wins: 6
- Win by KO: 1
- Losses: 13
- Draws: 3
- No contests: 0

Dennis Sydney Powell (27 July 1932 – 6 June 2023) was a British actor, boxer and stuntman.

== Life and career ==
Powell was born in London. He was the brother of Nosher Powell, an actor and stuntman. As a heavyweight boxer who fought professionally from 1951 to 1955, he fought Henry Cooper for the British heavyweight boxing championship, but was defeated. He began his screen career in 1958, becoming a stuntman in Leslie Norman's film Dunkirk. He stunt doubled for Sean Connery and Roger Moore in the James Bond films.

Later in his career, Powell performed stunts in television programs including Doctor Who, The Avengers, The Persuaders! and The Prisoner. He also performed stunts in numerous films such as The Fall of the Roman Empire, Brannigan, The Boys of Brazil, Curse of the Pink Panther, North Sea Hijack, Never Too Young to Rock, Those Magnificent Men in Their Flying Machines, Casino Royale, Those Daring Young Men in Their Jaunty Jalopies, The Adventures of Baron Munchausen and Revenge of the Pink Panther.

== Death ==
Powell died on 6 June 2023, at the age of 90.
