= Nite on the Tiles =

1976 song by Mud

- Netherlands single sleeve

Single by Mud

from the album It's Better Than Working
- B-side: "Time and Again"
- Released: 17 September 1976
- Length: 3:12
- Label: Private Stock (UK); Philips (Europe)
- Songwriter(s): Ray Stiles; Rob Davis
- Producer(s): Pip Williams

Mud singles chronology
"Shake It Down" (1976)	"Nite on the Tiles" (1976)	"Lean on Me" (1976)

"Nite on the Tiles" is a song by English glam rock band Mud, released by Private Stock on 17 September 1976 as the only single from their fourth studio album, It's Better Than Working. The song was written by bassist Ray Stiles and guitarist Rob Davis, and was produced by Pip Williams.

== Background ==
"Nite on the Tiles" was written by Mud bassist Ray Stiles and guitarist Rob Davis, who took on the band's songwriting duties after they split from the songwriting and production team of Nicky Chinn and Mike Chapman in 1975. Speaking of the song, Stiles told Record Mirror & Disc in 1976, "It's a bit of a change. It's perhaps musically the best thing we've done." The song was recorded in March 1976. Upon the completion of its parent album, It's Better Than Working, in the summer of 1976, the band were initially unsure of which song to release as a single from it.

"Nite on the Tiles" was subsequently chosen as the single by the band's labels, Private Stock in the UK and Philips in Europe. It was the band's first single to miss the UK top 50 since "Jumping Jehosaphat" in 1970, breaking their run of fourteen consecutive hits. After its commercial failure in the UK, Gray criticised the decision to release the song as a single. He told Record Mirror in 1976:

"It was the record company's choice, not ours. After [the previous single] 'Shake It Down', we had a lot of people saying: 'Well, it's not really Mud, is it?', so when it came to [the next] one, we called in the label managers from all over Europe and the [UK], sat them all down and played them everything. And they all chose 'Nite on the Tiles'. It turned out the guys from the continent were right, and the British bloke was wrong! It's done well all over Europe, but it just wasn't right for this country. I think Britain's moved forward a lot, and part of it is due to the commercial radio stations. People are beginning to go for more gentle, subtle sounds."

== Critical reception ==
Upon its release, David Hancock of Record Mirror & Disc stated, "Searing faster than ever, Mud give you something entirely different and more ambitious. Harmonies and good guitar work make you say 'thank you'." David Holmes of the Dorset Evening Echo described it as a "real rocker that's great for idiot dancing", but felt it was "maybe a little heavy for us popsters".

== Track listing ==
7–inch single (UK and Europe)

1. "Nite on the Tiles" – 3:12
2. "Time and Again" – 3:09

== Personnel ==
Mud

- Les Gray – vocals
- Rob Davis – guitar
- Ray Stiles – bass guitar
- Dave Mount – drums

Production

- Pip Williams – production ("Night on the Tiles")
- Ray Stiles – production ("Time and Again")
- Rob Davis – production ("Time and Again")

== Charts ==
Chart (1976)	Peak position
Belgium (Ultratop 50 Flanders)	30
Belgium (Ultratop 50 Wallonia)	47
Netherlands (Dutch Top 40)	22
Netherlands (Single Top 100)	28
UK Star Breakers Chart	5
