= Robert Longden (actor) =

British composer, director and actor (born 1951)

Robert Longden (born 5 October 1951) is a British composer, librettist, director and film, stage and television actor whose career has spanned four decades. In 1974 he took over the role of Riff Raff from Richard O'Brien in the original production of The Rocky Horror Show; later with Hereward Kaye he wrote the West End musical Moby Dick.

== Early life ==
Longden attended The King's School in his native Macclesfield before receiving a scholarship to train at the Royal Central School of Speech and Drama (1969 to 1974) where he was awarded the Diploma of Speech and Drama and the John Gielgud Award for comedy.

== Stage career ==
Longden's theatre career started with the Royal Shakespeare Company before taking over the role of Riff Raff from Richard O'Brien in the original production of The Rocky Horror Show in 1974 aged 24.

Theatre roles include Rosencrantz and Guildenstern Are Dead for the Young Vic; In the Boom Boom Room for American Repertory Theater; Cholly in Major Barbara for the Chichester Festival Theatre; he created the role of 'Mum' in the original production of Berkoff's East (1975) for the London Theatre Group with Berkoff in the cast; Earl Williams in Windy City (1982); Me and My Girl with Robert Lindsay (1984); Hilary Maddox-Brown in Outside Broadcast by Peter Woodward with David Tomlinson for the Birmingham Repertory Theatre and starred in the UK Tour of "Salad Days" directed by Ned Sherrin.

== Television and film ==
Television roles include Ginger Higgins in The Fenn Street Gang (1973); Hablot Knight Browne in Dickens of London (1976); Mr Willard in Me! I'm Afraid of Virginia Woolf (1978); Sapper Copping in Danger UXB (1979); Jeremy Delf in Agony (1980); appeared as a regular in the series Wood and Walters (1982); Stephen Mowat in Cloud Howe (1982); Mr Pasco in The Gentle Touch (1983); Mr Pitt in The Beiderbecke Trilogy (1984 to 1988); Boniface in Boon (1989); Professor Whitman in Spymaker: The Secret Life of Ian Fleming (1990); Dr. Louis Werner in Selling Hitler (1991); Flossie in The Blackheath Poisonings (1992); Freddie in Down to Earth (2005); Mr Weston in Torchwood (2006); Adrian Hammill in Blue Murder (2006); Martin Greenwood in Casualty (2007) and Walter Hickling in Doctors (2008).

Film work includes Heavenly Bliss in Adolf Hitler: My Part in His Downfall (1973); Apprentice in Confessions of a Window Cleaner (1974); Never Too Young to Rock (1975); Roadblock Policeman in The Stick Up (1977); Pettelson in Agatha (1979); Badger Beadon in Why Didn't They Ask Evans? 1980; Tape Operator in Give My Regards to Broad Street (1984) and Vicar in Night Train to Murder with Morecambe and Wise (1985).

== As a writer and composer ==
Longden wrote the music and words for the musical Moby Dick (1990) and directed it in the West End for Sir Cameron Mackintosh. The score was co composed with Hereward Kaye. He also wrote Pretty for the People (1989) and the musical The Fly based on the 1958 film of the same name.

Longden fronted two television documentaries: for Southern Television he wrote and presented The Grand about the Grand Brighton Hotel; and for Granada Television he wrote and presented The Small Available Joys (1980). In addition he was a guest on the BBC chat show Wogan, the entire programme being dedicated to Longden's musical Moby Dick.

Longden lives in Eastbourne in East Sussex.

== Filmography ==
Year	Title	Role	Notes
1973	Adolf Hitler: My Part in His Downfall	Heavenly Bliss	
1974	Confessions of a Window Cleaner	Apprentice	
1974	Escort Girls		
1976	Never Too Young to Rock		
1977	The Stick Up	Second Roadblock Policeman	
1979	Agatha	Pettelson	
1981	Shock Treatment	Soldier in DTV audience	(uncredited)
1984	Give My Regards to Broad Street	Tape Operator	
1987	The Beiderbecke Tapes	Mr Pitt	
1994	Decadence	The Entourage No. 5	
