= Greg Powell =

British stuntman

- Born: Gregory Owen Powell
- Occupations: Actor, stuntman, director, stunt coordinator
- Years active: 1970–present
- Parent: Nosher Powell (father)
- Relatives: Dinny Powell (uncle)

Gregory Owen Powell is a British stuntman, stunt coordinator, actor and 2nd unit director nominated for a Primetime Emmy Award for his work on Band of Brothers. He is also known for his work in Indian films. He is also the stunt coordinator for all eight Harry Potter movies and Avengers: Age of Ultron.

== Filmography ==
- 1971: Doctor Who: Terror of the Autons – Auton Policeman (uncredited)
- 1972: Doctor Who: The Time Monster – Knight
- 2020: Soorarai Pottru: [Flight Sequence]
