= Bristol Hippodrome =

Theatre in Bristol, England

Bristol Hippodrome.
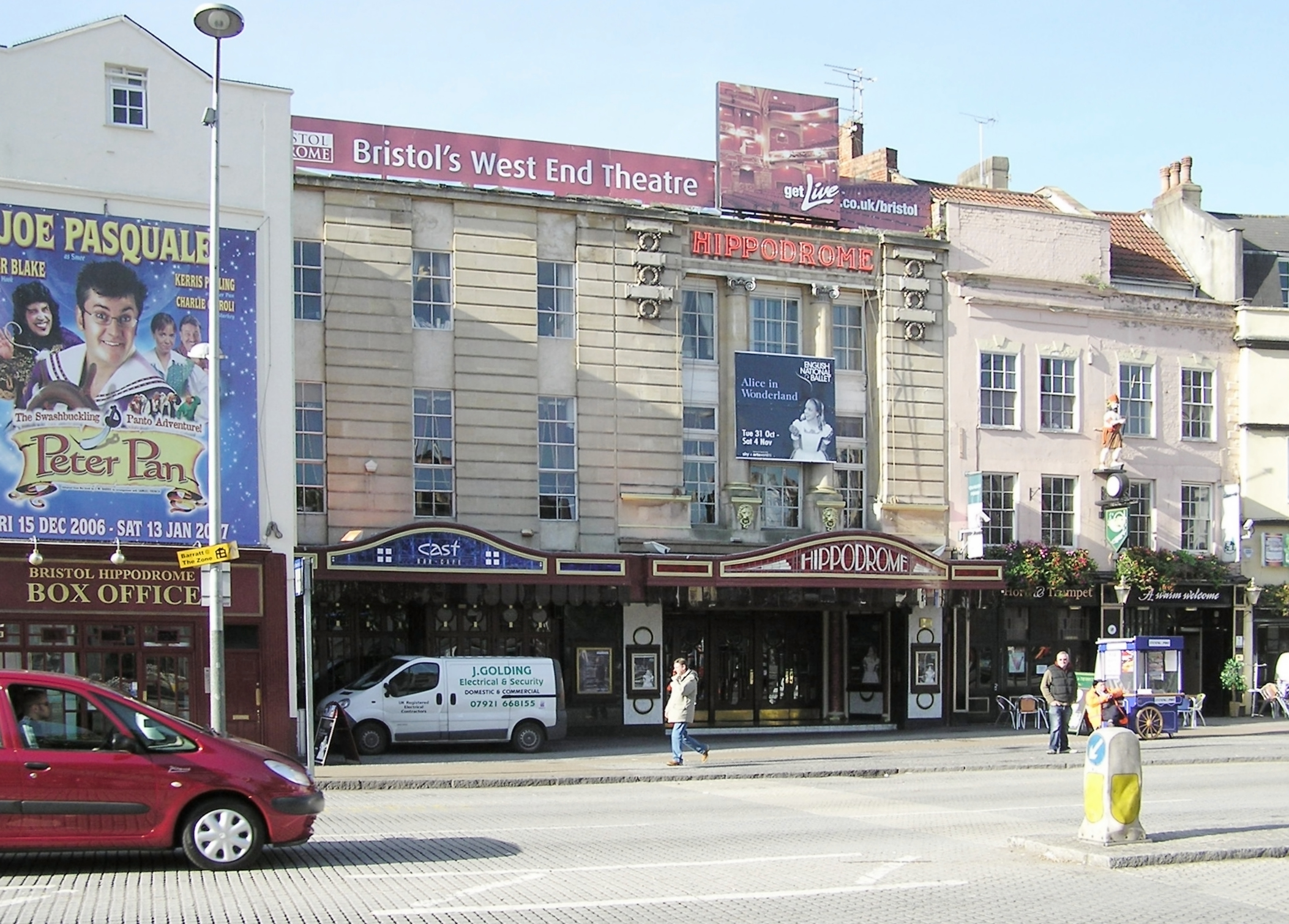
- Façade of the Bristol Hippodrome

- position within England
- Address: St Augustine's Parade; Bristol; England, United Kingdom
- Coordinates: 51.4531°N 2.5981°W
- Owner: Ambassador Theatre Group
- Capacity: 1,951
- Type: Provincial
- Designation

Listed Building – Grade II
- Official name: The Hippodrome
- Designated: 4 March 1977
- Reference no.: 1282137

Construction
- Opened: 1912
- Architect: Frank Matcham

Website
- Bristol Hippodrome website at ATG Entertainment

The Bristol Hippodrome (grid reference ST590729) is a theatre located in The Centre, Bristol, England, United Kingdom with seating on three levels giving a capacity of 1,951. It frequently features shows from London's West End when they tour the UK, as well as regular visits by Welsh National Opera and an annual pantomime.

== History ==
The theatre was designed by Frank Matcham for Oswald Stoll, and opened on 16 December 1912. It has been designated by English Heritage as a grade II listed building. An important feature of the theatre when it opened was a huge water tank at the front of the stage, which could be filled with 100,000 gallons (450,000 litres) of water. Along with the tank was a large protective glass screen which could be raised in order to protect the orchestra and those in the stalls. It also has a dome, which can be opened when necessary; however since air conditioning has been installed it is rarely opened.

The theatre survived World War II, but less than three years after it ended, a fire destroyed the stage, though not the auditorium. The theatre reopened about 10 months later.

American musician Eddie Cochran played his final show here, in 1960, and was killed in a road accident only hours later, in Chippenham, Wiltshire. Also George Formby played his last performance at the theatre on 14 January 1961.

The theatre plays host to many top shows, such as Phantom of the Opera, Miss Saigon, Cats, Les Misérables, Blood Brothers, Wicked and Of Mice and Men. This is due to the size of its stage, which is one of the largest outside London. In addition to large musicals it is also a venue for comedians such as Russell Howard, Frankie Boyle, Ricky Tomlinson and Lee Mack, as well as children's shows such as Winnie the Pooh Live, and regular pantomime shows of which regularly involve recurring headline performer Andy Ford. The Bristol Hippodrome has strong links with many shows that frequently appear there, such as the Welsh National Opera.

In 2012, the theatre celebrated its centenary with a show called Thanks for the Memories, staged by amateur groups Bristol Light Opera Club and Bristol Musical Youth Productions.

== Premieres ==
The theatre has staged a number of premieres including:

- British premiere of Guys and Dolls starring Vivian Blaine as Miss Adelaide and Sam Levene as Nathan Detroit, reprising their original Broadway performances; the musical opened on 19 May 1953 for an eight-performance run before opening at the London Coliseum on 28 May 1953 and running for 555 performances.
- European premiere The Music Man in 1961
- European premiere of Sail Away in 1962
- British premiere of Jeeves in 1975
- World premiere of Windy City in 1982
- World premiere of The Nutcracker by the English National Ballet in 2002
- World premiere of Mary Poppins in 2004
- World premiere of The Greatest Showman in 2026.

== Gallery ==
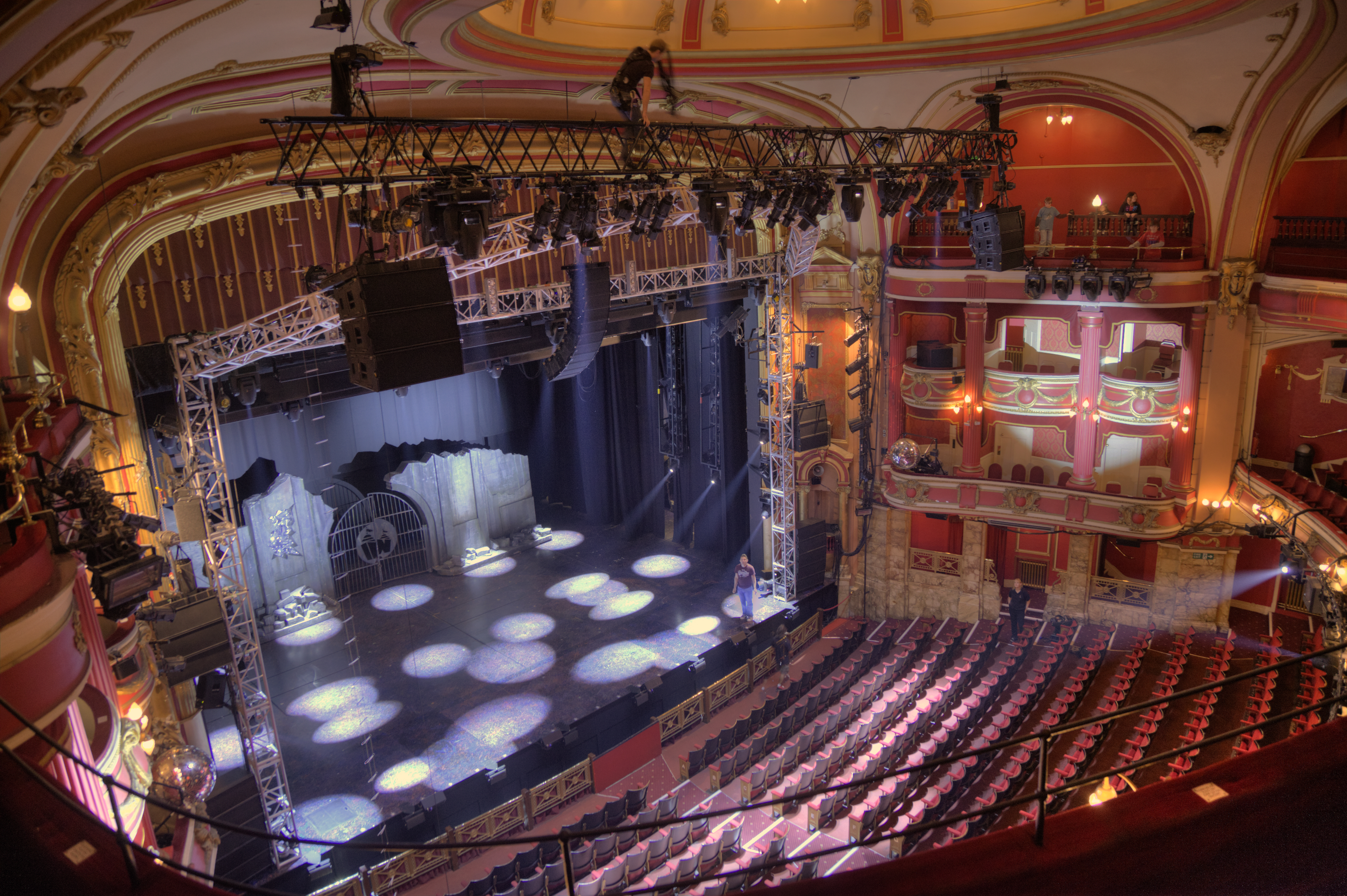
Auditorium from Upper Circle

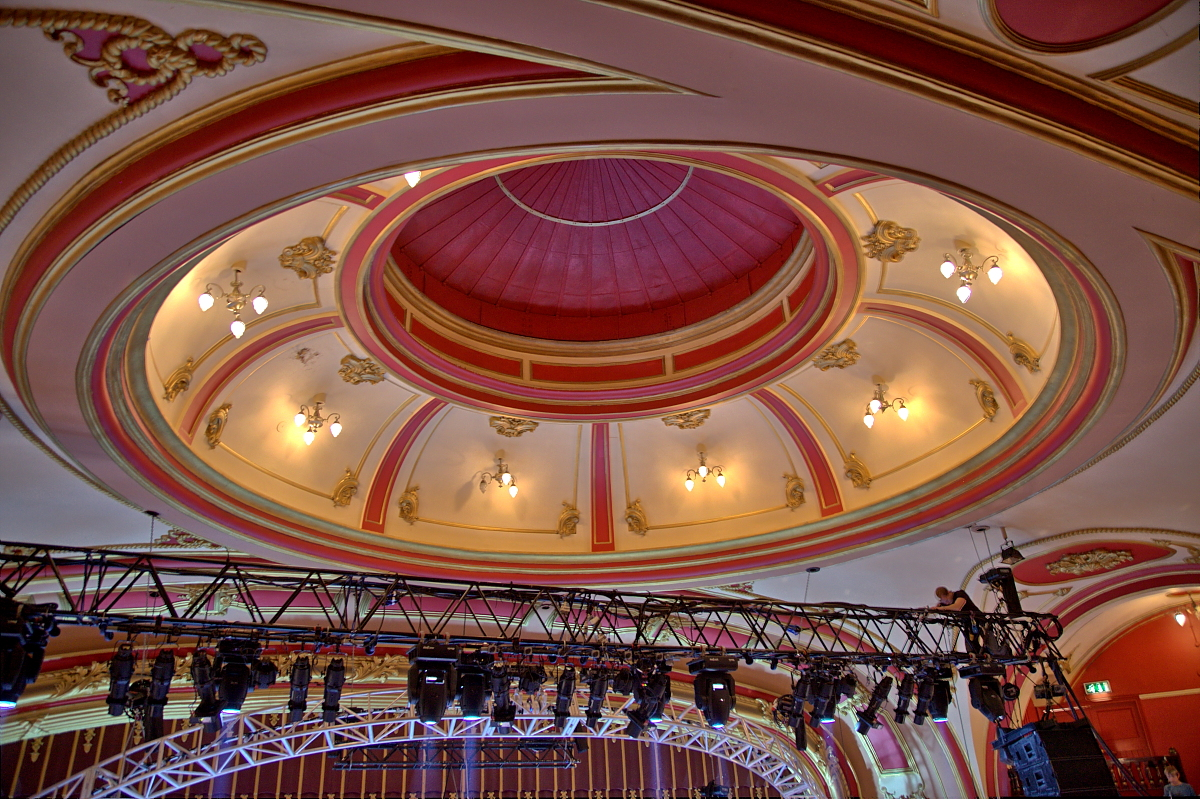
Auditorium Dome, last opened June 2026

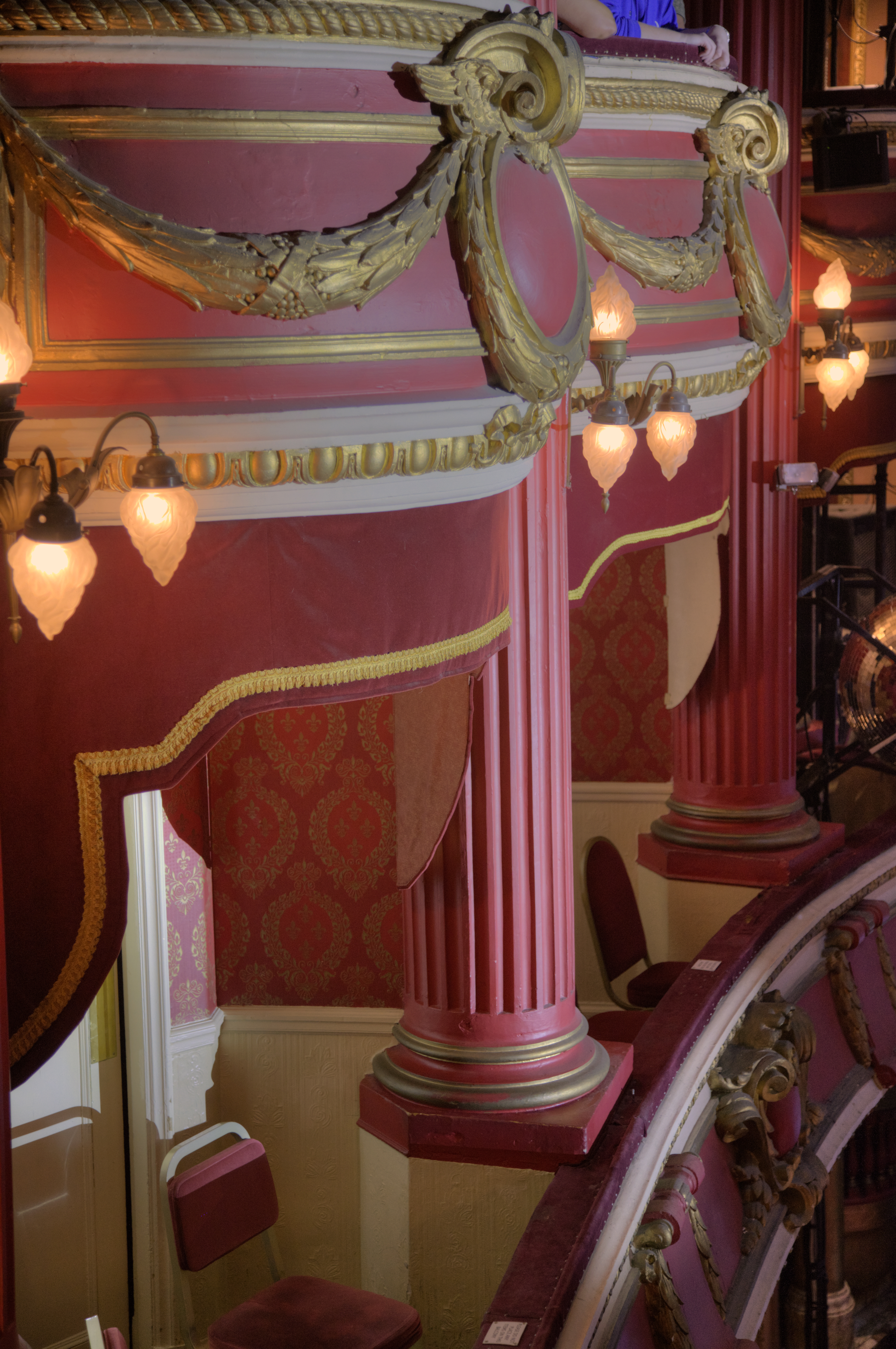
Detail of Auditorium Left Boxes

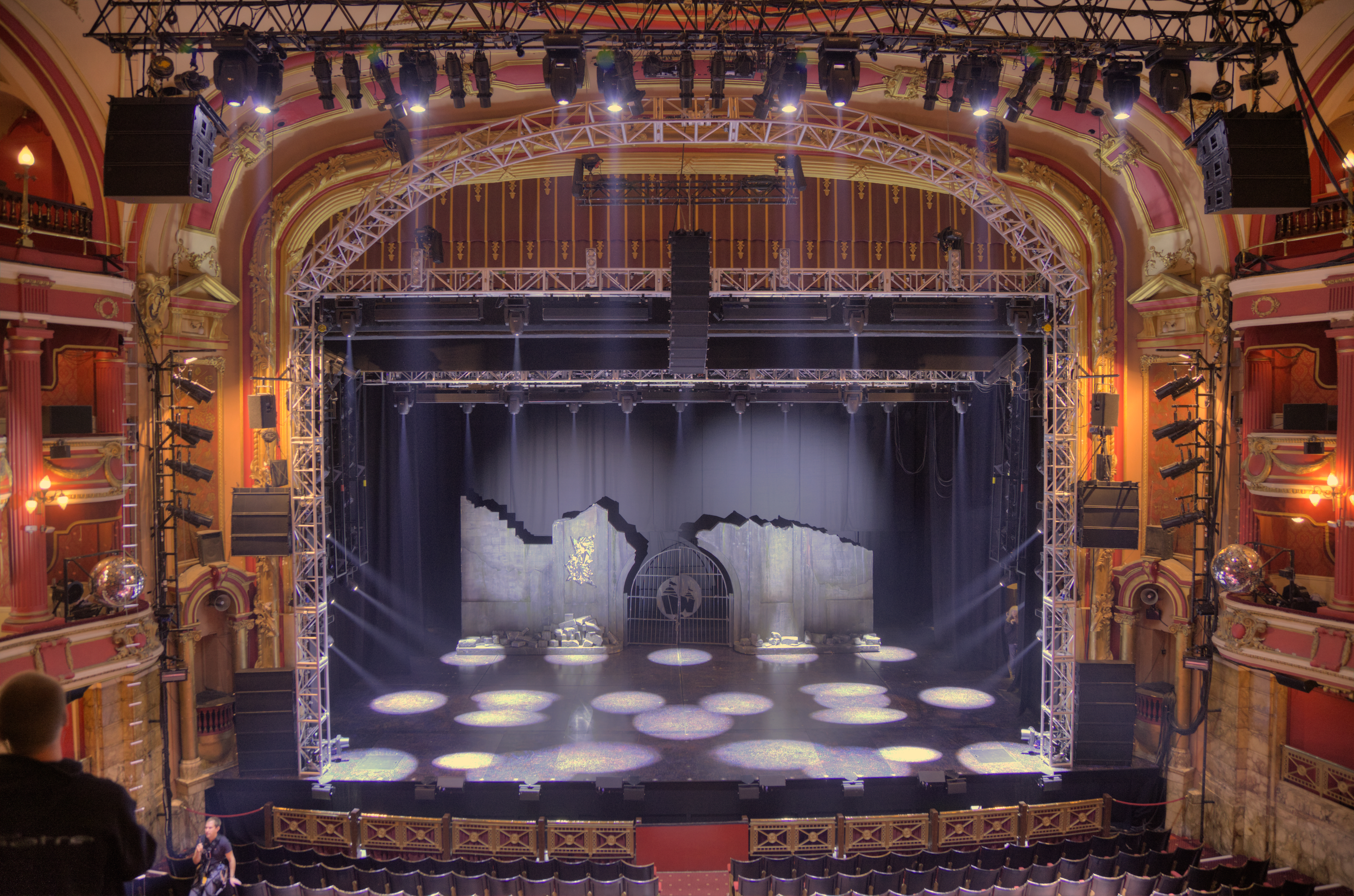
Stage from Auditorium centre

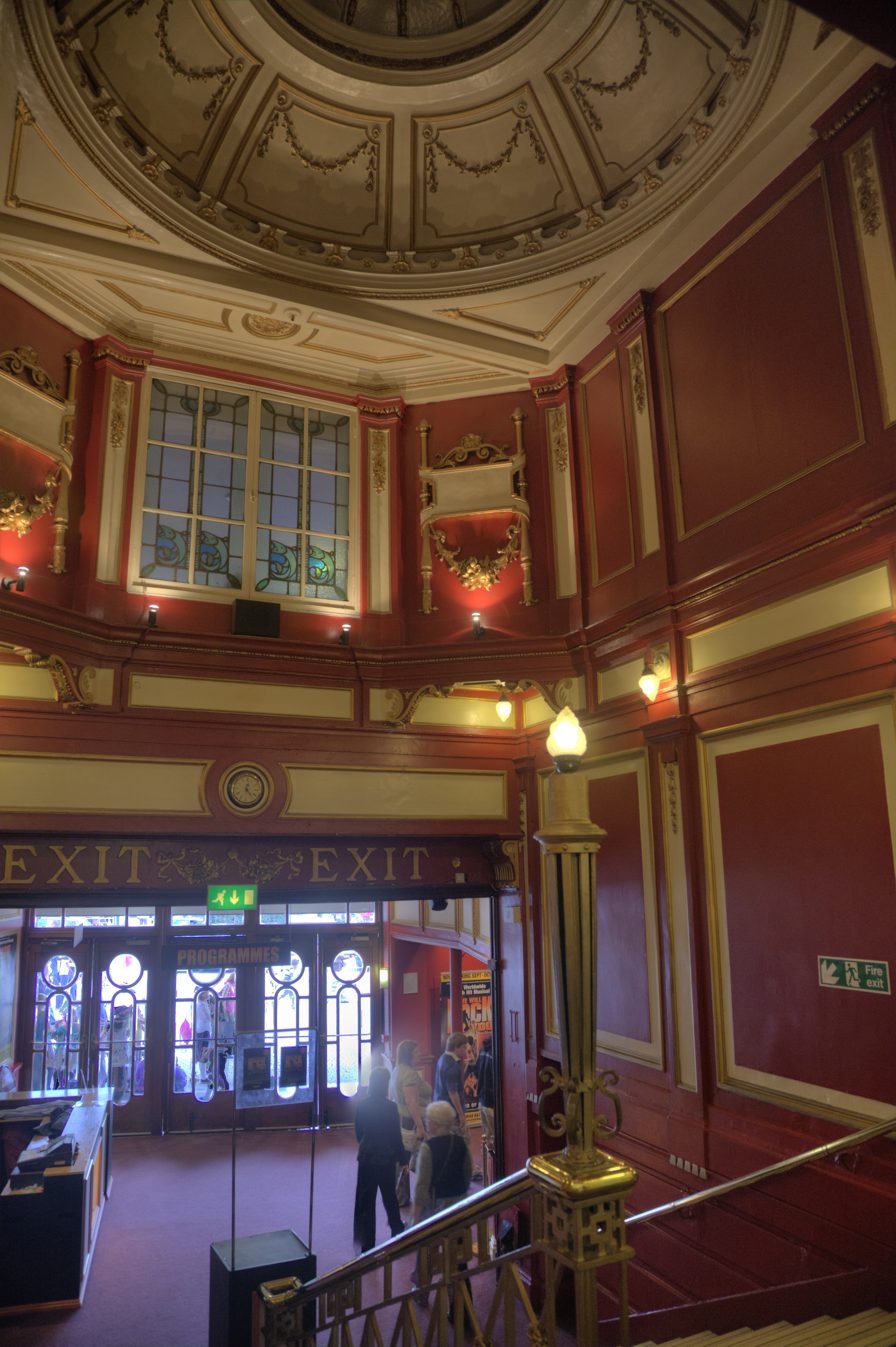
Entrance from St Augustine's Parade

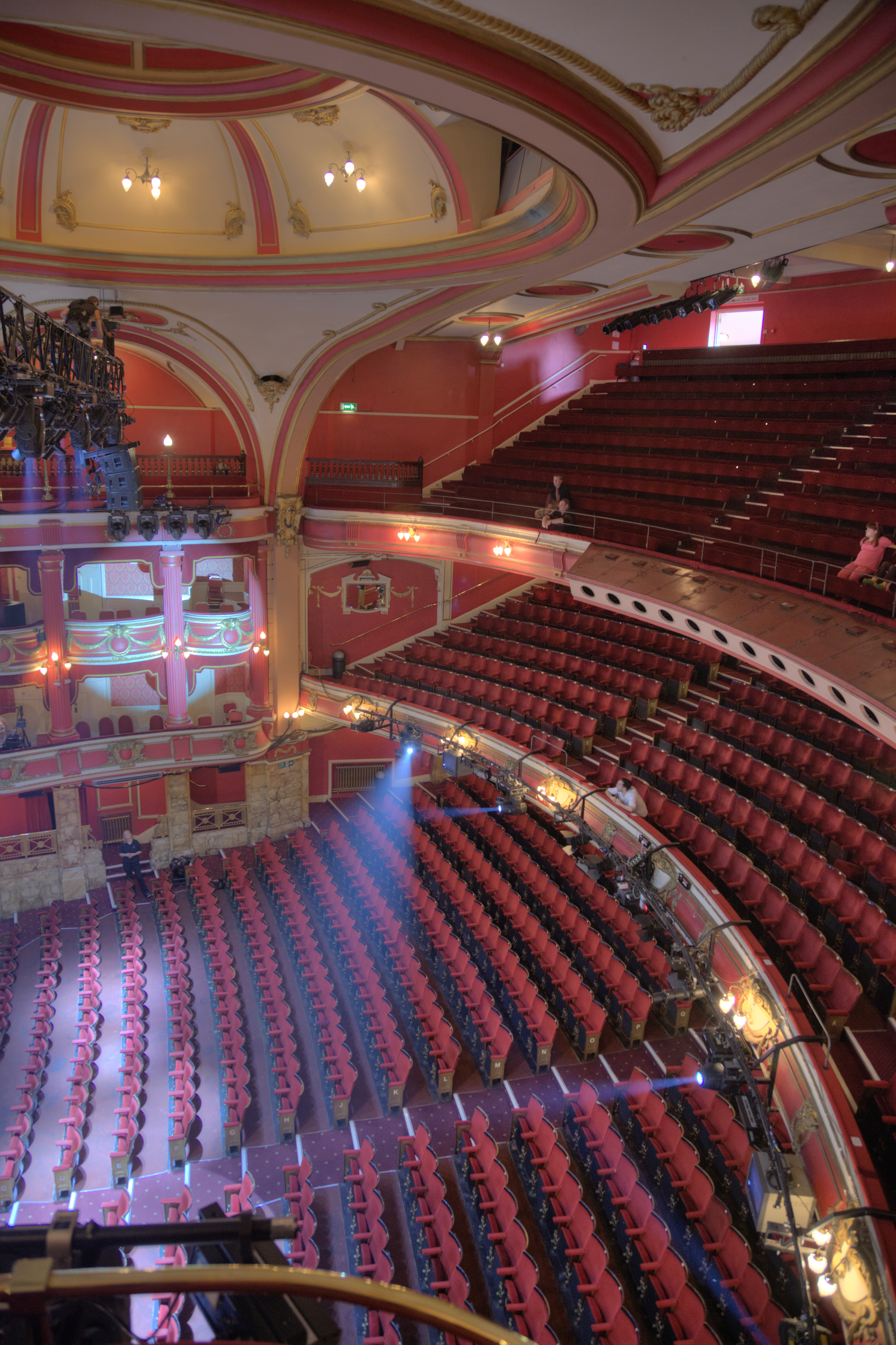
Auditorium from Upper Circle Box
