= Danny Green (actor) =

British actor (1903–1973)

- Green in The Ladykillers (1955)
- Born: 26 May 1903; London, England
- Died: 1973 (aged 69–70)
- Occupation: Actor
- Years active: 1929–1969

Danny Green (26 May 1903 – 1973) was an English actor. He was best known for his role as the slow-witted ex-boxer "One-Round" Lawson in The Ladykillers.

He worked regularly in film, television and on the stage, including playing comic gangsters in the original London productions of Guys and Dolls (1953) and Do Re Mi (1961).

One of his last roles was as Lord Surrey in the Randal and Hopkirk episode Just for the Record in 1969.

== Filmography ==
- The Crooked Billet (1929) - Rogers
- Atlantic (1929) - Passenger
- The Fire Raisers (1934) - Stedding's Henchman (uncredited)
- Wild Boy (1934) - Driver (uncredited)
- Things Are Looking Up (1935) - Big Black Fox
- Crime Over London (1936) - Klemm
- Silver Blaze (1937) - Barton, Moriarty's Henchman (uncredited)
- Midnight Menace (1937) - Socks, American Henchman
- Gangway (1937) - Shorty
- Jericho (1937) - Sergeant (uncredited)
- The Squeaker (1937) - Safecracker (uncredited)
- Non-Stop New York (1937) - Gangster (uncredited)
- Hey! Hey! USA (1938) - McGuire - Cop (uncredited)
- Sailors Three (1940) - Nightclub Bouncer (uncredited)
- Welcome, Mr. Washington (1944) - Hank (uncredited)
- Fiddlers Three (1944) - Lictor
- Madonna of the Seven Moons (1945) - Scorpi
- The Echo Murders (1945) - Carl
- The Man Within (1947) - Smuggler
- Dancing with Crime (1947) - Sid (uncredited)
- No Orchids for Miss Blandish (1948) - Flyn
- On the Spot (1948, TV film) - Con O'Hara
- Good-Time Girl (1948) - Smiling Billy
- Helter Skelter (1949) - Liftman (uncredited)
- Someone at the Door (1950) - Price
- Once a Sinner (1950) - Ticker James
- State Secret (1950) - Taxi Driver
- The Lady Craved Excitement (1950) - Boris
- Her Favourite Husband (1950) - Angel Face
- Mister Drake's Duck (1951) - Truck driver
- A Tale of Five Cities (1951) - Levinsky
- Whispering Smith Hits London (1952) - Cecil
- Little Big Shot (1952) - Big Mo
- Laughing Anne (1953) - Nicholas
- A Kid for Two Farthings (1955) - Bully Bason
- The Ladykillers (1955) - One-Round
- Jumping for Joy (1956) - Plug Ugly
- Assignment Redhead (1956) - Yotti Blum
- Seven Waves Away (1957) - Joe Woolsek
- Interpol (1957) - Second Bartender
- Wideawake (1957, TV film) - 'Professor' Hagen
- A Santa for Christmas (1957, TV film)
- A Tale of Two Cities (1958) - Grave Robber (uncredited)
- The 7th Voyage of Sinbad (1958) - Karim
- Hidden Homicide (1959) - Cliff Darby
- Beyond This Place (1959) - Roach
- In the Wake of a Stranger (1959) - Barnes
- Girls of the Latin Quarter (1960) - Hodgson
- Surprise Package (1960) - Nicky Canfield (uncredited)
- The Barber of Stamford Hill (broadcast 28th. July, 1960) - Mr. O - (ITV Television Playhouse, series 5, episode 47)
- Man in the Moon (1960) - Lorry driver
- The Fast Lady (1963) - Bandit
- The Old Dark House (1963) - Morgan Femm
- A Stitch in Time (1963) - Ticehurst, Man With Beard.
- Kiss Me Kate (1964, TV film) - Gangster
- Doctor in Clover (1966) - Ashby (uncredited)
- Smashing Time (1967)
- The Fixer (1968) - The Giggler (uncredited)
