= Tony Monopoly =

Cabaret singer and actor (1944–1995)

Tony Monopoly (3 December 1944 – 21 March 1995) was an Australian-born cabaret singer and actor who enjoyed success in the United Kingdom. Born Antonio Rosario Monopoli in Adelaide, he was a regular on the national radio show, Kangaroos on Parade at the age of nine as a boy soprano.

At the age of sixteen he became a Carmelite friar and remained in the order for five years. During the 1960s he regularly performed with Edwin Duff and Norm Erskine, as a trio of singers, on In Melbourne Tonight and Tonight with Don Lane.

In 1975 he was appearing at Caesar's Palace in Luton when he auditioned for and appeared on Opportunity Knocks, a British television talent show, and won six weekly shows. In June 1976, his self-titled album peaked at No. 25 in the UK Albums Chart.

In a national pre-selection to choose the song that would go to the Eurovision Song Contest, held on 9 March 1977 at the New London Theatre, Monopoly earned 66 points and placed ninth with the tune "Leave a Little Love." By the early 1980s Monopoly performed aboard cruise liners, "I lived on one yacht for a year," he said. "I went to 56 countries. I had champagne for breakfast. But I hated it". When fulfilling his increasingly rare engagements on dry land, he divided his time between Australia and the UK.

Monopoly was head-hunted for a musical while appearing in Cinderella at Hanley, Stoke-on-Trent. He starred – in drag – in Moby Dick, the inaugural production at the newly refurbished Old Fire Station Theatre in Oxford. The show's success prompted Cameron Mackintosh to mount a 1992 West End production, which opened to scathing reviews and promptly closed, after which Monopoly portrayed Old Deuteronomy in a UK tour of Cats.

Monopoly died of cancer in Brighton, England on 21 March 1995.

In 2000, a character named Tony Cluedo - an obvious reference to Tony Monopoly - played By Ted Robbins, appeared in Series 2 of BBC TV comedy The League of Gentlemen as the lead singer of Crème Brulee.
