= Use Your Imagination =

Studio album by Mud
- Released: 5 December 1975
- Recorded: 1-25 July 1975
- Studios: Audio International, London
- Genres: Glam rock, pop rock, rock and roll
- Label: Private Stock
- Producer: Phil Wainman

Mud chronology
Mud Rock Vol. II (1975)	Use Your Imagination (1975)	It's Better Than Working (1976)

Singles from Use Your Imagination
- 1. "L'L'Lucy" Released: 19 September 1975; 2. "Show Me You're a Woman" Released: 14 November 1975; 3. "Use Your Imagination" Released: 1976

Use Your Imagination is the third studio album by the English glam rock band Mud, released on 5 December 1975 by Private Stock Records. It was their first album following the end of their association with the songwriting and production team Chinn and Chapman and the label RAK Records, and the first to feature a substantial number of the band's own compositions. The album was produced by Phil Wainman, who had previously worked with the Sweet, and was recorded at Audio International Studios in London in July 1975.

The album reached number 33 on the UK Albums Chart, and also charted in Finland, the Netherlands, and Belgium. The British Phonographic Industry (BPI) certified the album silver in December 1975.

== Background and recording ==
Following their commercial success with RAK Records and the songwriting and production partnership of Chinn and Chapman, Mud moved to Private Stock Records in 1975. The band began recording material for their new album in July, with Phil Wainman taking over production duties. Wainman had previously worked with Mud as a songwriter, contributing material to their earlier recordings. The album was recorded at Audio International Studios in London between 1 and 25 July 1975.

Andy Ball, formerly of Candlewick Green, played keyboards on the album; although not an official member of the band, he had begun appearing with them on stage and on record. Sounds magazine later announced him as an official member of the band in September 1975. Pip Williams provided the brass and string arrangements,

The album marked a departure from Mud's previous releases, featuring a substantial number of original compositions, rather than the predominantly cover-based material of their first two albums. In October 1975, Record Mirror reported that the forthcoming album would contain five songs written by bassist Ray Stiles and guitarist Rob Davis, one by drummer Dave Mount, three by Wainman with his songwriting partner John Goodison, and two older songs.

== Release and commercial performance ==
‘‘Use Your Imagination’’ was released in the UK on 5 December 1975 through Private Stock Records on LP, cassette and 8-track cartridge, as advertised in Music Week 29 November 1975. It reached number 33 on the UK Albums Chart, spending 5 weeks on the chart. The album received a silver certification from the BPI on 22 December 1975.

The international release was via Philips. The two competing Dutch charts had different peaks for the album. The industry favoured 'Veronica / Stichting Nederlandse LP Top 50' lists a peak of 27, whereas the 'Nationale Hitparade LP Top 20' shows a peak of 17. The album also charted in Finland, where it peaked at number 8, and Belgium, where it made number 5.

Three singles were released from the album:

- "L'L'Lucy", released 19 September 1975. Written by Davis and Stiles it peaked at number 10 on the UK Singles Chart.
- "Show Me You're a Woman", released 14 November 1975. Written by Wainman and Goodison, it peaked at number 8 on the UK Singles Chart.
- "Use Your Imagination", released in Italy in 1976.

== Critical reception ==
Professional ratings
Review scores
Source	Rating
Record Mirror	Positive
AllMusic	3.5/5 stars

In a review published in December 1975, PH of Record Mirror praised the album, describing Mud as “the kings of pop rock” and commending their continued commitment to rock and roll. The reviewer highlighted the heavier sound of “R.U. Man Enough?”, the Elvis-influenced “She’s Got the Devil in Her Eyes” and the band’s original compositions. The review also singled out “Hair of the Dog” and the title track, suggesting that the latter pointed towards a more developed songwriting direction for Davis and Stiles. It concluded that the record was “honest to goodness pop” with indications of a more sophisticated sound emerging from the group.

Reviewing the album retrospectively for AllMusic, Tim Sendra considered it a departure from the band’s earlier records, noting the increased emphasis on original compositions. He praised the energetic rock tracks, including “R.U. Man Enough?”, “Don’t Knock It”, “Hair of the Dog” and “L’L’Lucy”, as well as the rockabilly-influenced “43792 (I’m Bustin’ You)” and the title track. However, he was less enthusiastic about the ballads “Show Me You’re a Woman” and “Maybe Tomorrow”. Sendra concluded that, despite some weaker material, the album was a strong effort and possibly the band’s best.

== Track listing ==
All tracks written by Ray Stiles and Rob Davis except where noted.

Side one
No.	Title	Writer(s)	Length
1.	"R.U. Man Enough?"	Stiles, Davis, Barry Dunning	3:35
2.	"She's Got the Devil in Her Eyes"	Phil Wainman, John Goodison	2:37
3.	"Don't Knock It"		3:03
4.	"Maybe Tomorrow"		3:23
5.	"43792 (I'm Bustin' You)"	Wainman, Goodison	2:54
6.	"Hair of the Dog"	Dave Mount, David Mindel	3:13

Side two
No.	Title	Writer(s)	Length
7.	"L'L'Lucy"		3:01
8.	"Show Me You're a Woman"	Wainman, Goodison	4:01
9.	"Bird Dog"	Boudleaux Bryant	3:55
10.	"Use Your Imagination"		4:57
11.	"Under the Moon of Love"	Tommy Boyce, Curtis Lee	4:00

2004 CD reissue bonus tracks
No.	Title	Writer(s)	Length
12.	"My Love Is Your Love"	Stiles, Davis, Mount, Les Gray	2:56
13.	"Don't You Know"		3:06

== Personnel ==
Credits adapted from the original LP sleeve notes.

Mud

- Les Gray – lead vocals, trumpet
- Rob Davis – guitars, vocals
- Ray Stiles – bass, vocals
- Dave Mount – drums, vocals

Additional personnel

- Andy Ball – keyboards
- Pip Williams – string and brass arrangements

Production

- Phil Wainman – producer (courtesy of the Utopia Group)

== Charts ==
Chart (1975-1976)	Peak position
Belgian Albums (Ultratop Wallonia)	5
Finnish Albums (Suomen virallinen albumilista)	8
Netherlands (Nationale Hitparade LP Top 20)	17
Netherlands (Veronica LP Top 50)	27
UK Albums (Official Charts)	33

== Certifications ==
Region	Certification	Certified units/sales
United Kingdom (BPI)	Silver	60,000^{^}
^{^} Shipments figures based on certification alone.
