= Windy City (musical) =

Windy City is a 1982 musical with a book and lyrics by Dick Vosburgh and music by Tony Macaulay. It is based on the 1928 play The Front Page by Ben Hecht and Charles MacArthur.

== Plot ==
Set in 1929, the story focuses on ace reporter Hildy Johnson, who has just quit his job at the Chicago Examiner to marry his fiancée Esther Stone and write screenplays for her movie mogul father, much to the dismay of unscrupulous and cantankerous editor Walter Burns. When streetwalker Mollie Malloy, girlfriend of escaped condemned killer Earl Williams, reveals to Hildy he has secreted himself in a rolltop desk in the courthouse, Hildy cannot resist the lure of writing what could be the biggest scoop of his journalistic career before he boards the train for the West Coast.

== Production history ==
Windy City had its world premiere at the Bristol Hippodrome in June 1982 before opening in the West End on July 20 at the Victoria Palace, where it closed on February 26, 1983 after 250 performances. Directed by Peter Wood, the cast included Dennis Waterman as Hildy Johnson, Anton Rodgers as Walter Burns, Amanda Redman as Esther Stone, Robert Longden as Earl Williams, Diane Langton as Mollie Malloy, and Victor Spinetti as poetic reporter Bensinger.

In the United States, Windy City was staged at the Marriott Theatre in Lincolnshire, Illinois from February 2 through April 22, 1984, and was remounted at the Marriott in the early 1990s.

A production staged at the Paper Mill Playhouse in Millburn, New Jersey in September 1985 starred Ron Holgate as Walter Burns, Gary Sandy as Hildy Johnson, Judy Kaye as Mollie Malloy, and Alan Sues as Bensinger. In his review in The New York Times, Alvin Klein observed, "Dick Vosburgh's mediocre book and mundane lyrics, replete with contrived rhymes that make no sense whatever, and Tony Macaulay's forgettable score are stuck in standard musical comedy mold. The jagged edge of the journalist's world eludes them. The adapters aim for the heart when they should be going for the jugular. The tough center of the plot is diluted, and the effect is something like having to settle for skim milk when one wants a drink with a kick . . . One wonders about the intent of an enterprise like Windy City. What is its tone? Is it supposed to be a spoof? An affectionate recreation? Either way, it has gone askew."

Another regional theatre production, starring David Elder and Paul Schoeffler, was staged at the Walnut Street Theatre in Philadelphia from September 5 through October 22, 2006.

== Song list ==
- Bensinger's Poem
- Born Reporter
- Circles 'Round Us
- The Day I Quit This Rag
- Hey, Hallelujah
- I Can Talk To You
- Just Imagine It
- Long Night Again Tonight
- Mollie Has Her Say
- Natalie
- No One Walks Out On Me
- Perfect Casting
- Round In Circles
- Saturday
- Stamp! Stamp! Stamp!
- Ten Years From Now
- The Times We Had
- Wait Till I Get You On Your Own
- Water Under the Bridge
- Windy City
