= Mud Rock Vol. II =

Studio album by Mud
- Released: 20 June 1975
- Recorded: December 1974
- Studios: Audio International Studios, London
- Genres: Glam rock, rock and roll, pop rock
- Length: 30:55
- Label: RAK
- Producers: Mike Chapman, Nicky Chinn

Mud chronology
Mud Rock (1974)	Mud Rock Vol. II (1975)	Use Your Imagination (1975)

Singles from Mud Rock Vol. II
- 1. "The Secrets That You Keep" Released: 7 February 1975; 2. "Oh Boy" Released: 18 April 1975; 3. "One Night" Released: 18 July 1975; 4. "Hula Love" Released: 1975; 5. "Living Doll" Released: 1976; 6. "Let's Have a Party" Released: 1976

Mud Rock Vol. II is the second studio album by English glam rock band Mud. It was released on 20 June 1975 by RAK Records and produced by songwriting and production duo Nicky Chinn and Mike Chapman.

The album followed the commercial success of the band's debut Mud Rock (1974). It consisted predominantly of cover versions, with nine of its ten tracks being interpretations of previously recorded songs by acts such as Cliff Richard, Elvis Presley, and Paul Anka.

Mud Rock Vol. II reached number 6 on the UK Albums Chart, spending 12 weeks on the chart. It also reached the top five in the Netherlands and charted in West Germany and Norway.

== Background and recording ==
Mud recorded their second album at Audio International Studios in London with producers Mike Chapman and Nicky Chinn. The sessions took place in December 1974, bassist Ray Stiles said the album was recorded and mixed in five days.

The album continued the 'party' record approach of its predecessor, with party noises between tracks and spoken contributions from Geoffrey, the presenter featured on the first album. Compared with the first album, the record featured a wider range of additional musicians. These included strings arranged by Phil Dennys, brass performed by Gonzalez, piano by Pete Wingfield, backing vocals by Ellie Hope, and pedal steel guitar by Harvey Hinsley on selected tracks.

== Release and commercial performance ==
Mud Rock Vol. II was released in the United Kingdom in June 1975 by RAK Records on LP, cassette and 8-track cartridge, as advertised pre-release in Record Mirror, and post-release in Disc magazine.

A total of six singles were released from the album:

- "The Secrets That You Keep", released 7 February 1975. Peaked at number 3 on several national charts including the UK singles chart.
- "Oh Boy", released 18 April 1975. Achieved number 1 in the UK, and Ireland.
- "One Night", released 18 July 1975. Peaked at number 7 on the Belgian (Flanders) Ultratop chart.
- "Hula Love", released in 1975 to continental Europe, where it charted in Germany reaching number 38.
- "Living Doll", released in 1976 in Germany, but did not chart.
- "Let's Have a Party", released in 1976 in Germany, but did not chart.

The album entered the UK Albums Chart on 26 July 1975 and reached a peak position of number 6. It spent 12 weeks on the chart. International chart peaks included number 4 in the Netherlands, number 34 in West Germany, number 19 in Norway, and number 5 in Finland.

On 1 March 1976 the album received a gold certification from the BPI in the United Kingdom.

== Critical reception ==
Professional ratings
Review scores
Source	Rating
Record Mirror	Positive
NME	Positive
AllMusic	3.5/5 stars

The album received positive reviews from the British music press. Record Mirror considered it slightly superior to its predecessor, praising the arrangements, production and performances, particularly the contributions of Pete Wingfield and the brass section Gonzalez. The review concluded that Mud had "never sounded better". Reviewing the album in New Musical Express, Bob Edwards described it as arguably the most consistent of the albums under consideration. He praised Les Gray's vocal performances on "One Night", "Hula Love" and "The Secrets That You Keep", as well as the band's versions of "Oh Boy" and "Living Doll". Edwards considered the album's humour and entertainment value among its principal strengths.

In a retrospective review for AllMusic, Dave Thompson regarded the album as following much the same formula as its predecessor, with its selection of rock and roll covers and party atmosphere. Although he criticised the lack of musical ambition, he praised several performances, including "Hula Love", "Let's Have a Party" and "One Night".

== Track listing ==
Side one
No.	Title	Writer(s)	Length
1.	"The Secrets That You Keep"	Nicky Chinn, Mike Chapman	3:07
2.	"Living Doll"	Lionel Bart	2:55
3.	"One Night"	Dave Bartholomew, Pearl King	2:53
4.	"Tallahassee Lassie"	Bob Crewe,Frank Slay Jr., Frederick Picariello	3:16
5.	"Let's Have a Party"	Jessie Mae Robinson	1:40

Side two
No.	Title	Writer(s)	Length
6.	"Tobacco Road"	John D. Loudermilk	3:20
7.	"Oh Boy"	Bill Tilghman, Norman Petty, Sonny West	2:50
8.	"I Love How You Love Me"	Barry Mann, Larry Kolber	3:03
9.	"Hula Love"	Buddy Knox	4:00
10.	"Diana"	Paul Anka	3:56
Total length:			30:55

== Personnel ==
Credits adapted from the original LP liner notes.

Mud

- Les Gray – lead vocals
- Rob Davis – guitar, vocals
- Ray Stiles – bass, vocals
- Dave Mount – drums, vocals

Additional musicians

- Phil Dennys – strings (tracks 2, 8, 10)
- Gonzalez – brass (tracks 3, 6)
- Pete Wingfield – piano (tracks 4, 5)
- Ellie – backing vocals (tracks 7, 9)
- Harvey Hinsley – pedal steel guitar (track 9)

Production

- Mike Chapman – producer
- Nicky Chinn – producer
- Pete Coleman – engineer
- Phil Colman – tape operator
- Chris Blair – lacquer cutting
- Gered Mankowitz – photography

== Charts ==
Chart (1975)	Peak position
Norwegian Albums (VG-lista)	19
Finnish Albums (Suomen virallinen albumilista)	5
German Albums (Offizielle Top 100)	34
Dutch Albums (Album Top 100)	4
UK Albums (Official Charts)	6

== Certifications ==
Region	Certification	Certified units/sales
United Kingdom (BPI)	Gold	100,000^{^}
^{^} Shipments figures based on certification alone.

== Release history ==
- 20 June 1975 – Original UK LP (RAK SRAK 513), cassette (TC-SRAK 513) and 8-track cartridge (8X-SRAK 513).
- 1976 – Double LP reissue paired with Mud Rock (RAK 52446).
- 1998 – CD 2 in 1 reissue with Mud Rock (BGO Records BGOCD415).
- 2012 - CD 2 in 1 reissue with Mud Rock (EMI R&R121111)
