= Andy Ford (comedian) =

British comedian (born 1957)

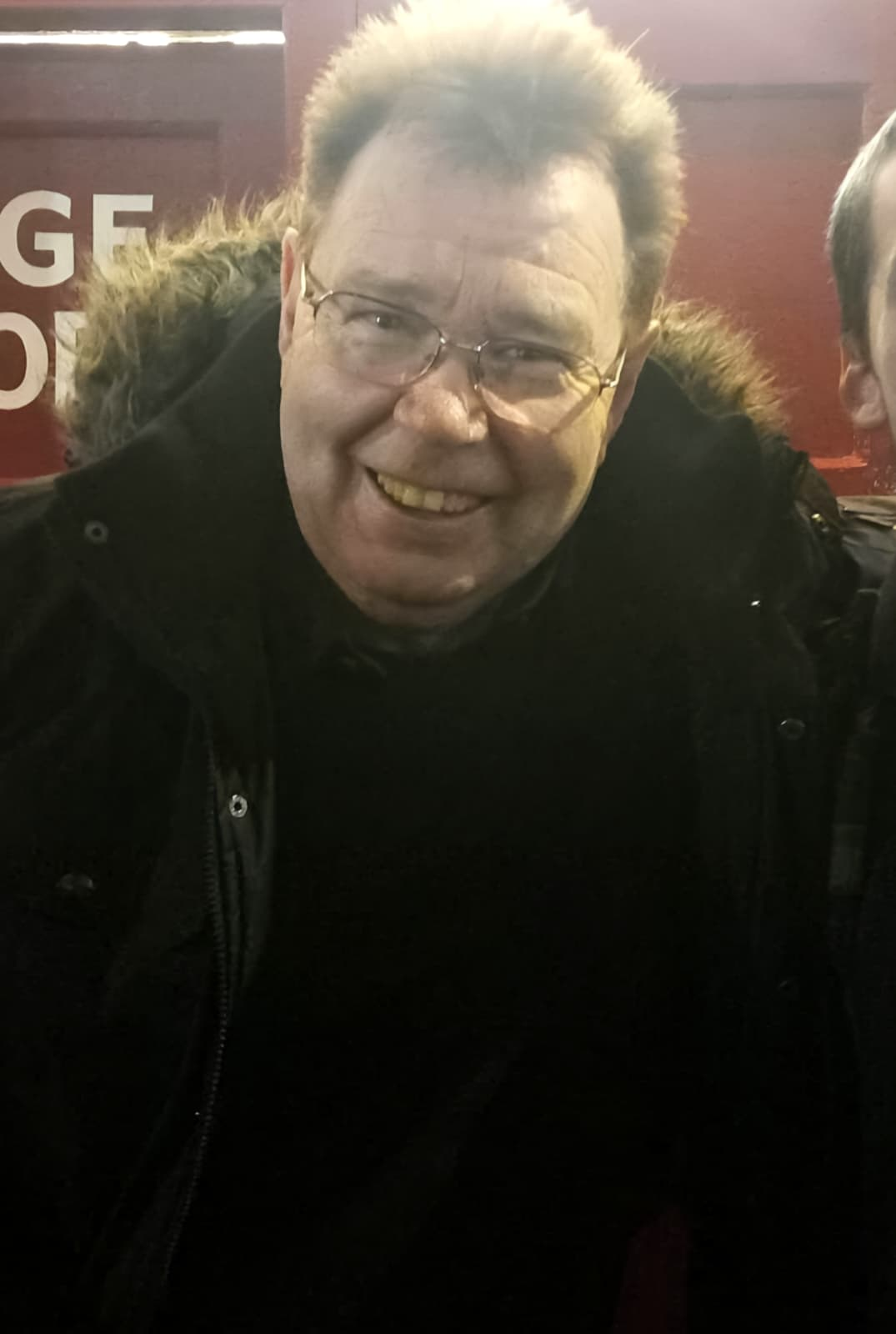
- Ford in 2022
- Born: Andrew Ernest Mogford; February 23, 1957 (age 69); Exeter, Devon, England
- Occupations: Comedian; actor; writer
- Years active: 1997–present
- Spouses: Chris (m. 1977; div. 1993); Michelle (m. 1993)
- Children: 2
- Website: andyfordcomedian.com

Andrew Ernest Mogford (born 23 February 1957) is a British comedian, performer, and writer. He is best known for his many years of work in pantomime.

Ford has performed in major theatres across the United Kingdom for over three decades. He has become particularly synonymous with the Bristol Hippodrome, where he has headlined more than a dozen productions. His stage career is characterised by collaborations with international and national stars, such as Henry Winkler, David Hasselhoff, Barbara Windsor and Steve McFadden.

He maintains close friendships with several co-stars, including Steve McFadden, Joe Pasquale, and Kara Tointon. His most notable professional admirer was the late Barbara Windsor. During her 2010 return to pantomime in Dick Whittington at the Bristol Hippodrome, Windsor was such a fan of Ford's work that she reportedly stipulated in her contract that he must be included in the cast.

== Career ==
Ford's career in entertainment began at the age of 12 with his first professional paid engagement. By 14, he had established himself as a vocalist, fronting a band for several years before transitioning into a solo career. During his time on the cabaret circuit, he began integrating comedy into his musical sets; the success of this humour caught the attention of industry agents, leading to a period of national tours and international cruise ship engagements.

Ford first appeared on British television screens in 1997 with a performance on Jonathan Ross' Big Big Talent Show This led to further high-profile guest appearances, including a spot on Des O'Connor Tonight, and an appearance on Phillip Schofield's Talking Telephone Numbers.

In 1997, Ford performed at the Royal Variety Performance in the presence of Queen Elizabeth II. Despite the prestige of the event, what should have been his major television breakthrough was cut from the final broadcast edit due to the live show overrunning its schedule.

In addition to his performance work, Ford is an active scriptwriter and comedy educator. In 2016 he founded Confidence Through Comedy, an online resource designed to help individuals globally use humour to enhance their public speaking and personal confidence.

== Pantomime History ==
As of 2025, Andy's appearance in Jack and the Beanstalk marks his 12th production at the Bristol Hippodrome, further cementing his status as one of the venue’s most recurring headline performers.

Year	Production	Venue	Notable Co-Stars
1997	Peter Pan	Bournemouth Pavilion & Bristol Hippodrome	
1998	The Wizard of Oz	Reading Hexagon	Michaela Strachan
1999	Cinderella	Sheffield Lyceum	Jansen Spencer
2000	Jack and the Beanstalk	Croydon	Kate Ritchie & Chris Jarvis (presenter)
2001	Snow White	The Dartford Orchard	Letitia Dean
2002	Peter Pan	Derngate Theatre, Northampton	John Altman (actor)
2003	Aladdin	The Ashcroft Theatre, Croydon	Dean Gaffney
2004	Cinderella	Doncaster Civic	Maureen Nolan
2005	Snow White	Theatre Royal Nottingham	Claire Sweeney
2006	Snow White	Ashcroft Theatre, Croydon	Bernie Nolan
2007	Peter Pan	Churchill Theatre, Bromley	Paul Michael Glaser
2008	Peter Pan	Milton Keynes Theatre	Henry Winkler
2009	Snow White and the Seven Dwarfs	Bristol Hippodrome	Joe Swash
2010	Dick Whittington	Bristol Hippodrome	Barbara Windsor
2011	Peter Pan	Bristol Hippodrome	David Hasselhoff
2012	Aladdin	Bristol Hippodrome	Josie Gibson & Carol McGiffin
2013	Cinderella	Bristol Hippodrome	Louie Spence
2014	Dick Whittington	Bristol Hippodrome	Eric Potts
2015	Snow White	Bristol Hippodrome	Warwick Davis
2016	Snow White	New Victoria Theatre, Woking	Warwick Davis
2017	Peter Pan	Theatre Royal Plymouth	Steve McFadden
2018	Dick Whittington	Theatre Royal Plymouth	Samantha Womack & John Partridge (actor)
2019	Peter Pan	Orchard Theatre, Dartford	Steve McFadden
2020	Robinson Crusoe	Theatre Royal Plymouth	Les Dennis & Connor McIntyre
2021	Snow White and the Seven Dwarfs	Bristol Hippodrome	Lesley Joseph & Robert Rinder
2022	Cinderella	Bristol Hippodrome	Craig Revel Horwood
2023	Peter Pan	Bristol Hippodrome	David Suchet & Faye Tozer
2024	Snow White and the Seven Dwarfs	Theatre Royal Plymouth	Su Pollard
2025	Jack and the Beanstalk	Bristol Hippodrome	Will Young & Richard Cadell

== Filmography ==
=== Television ===
Year	Production	Notes
1994	Talking Telephone Numbers	Television (Guest Appearance)
1997	Jonathan Ross' Big Big Talent Show	Television (Initial Break)
1997	Royal Variety Performance	Royal Variety (Live Performance)
1998	Havakazoo	Played "Patrick the Baker"
1998	Des O'Connor Tonight	Television (Guest Appearance)
2003	Today with Des and Mel	Television (Guest Appearance)

=== Stand-up and Performance Releases ===
Year	Title	Genre	Notes
2004	Live and Lovely	Stand-up	Live stand-up comedy
2006	Live 2 – West End Crazy	Stand-up	Live stand-up comedy
2010	This is My Day Job	Stand-up	Live stand-up comedy
2012	Comic Collection	Compilation	A collection of comical creations and unseen stand-up
2013	Panto Man	Compilation	A collection of Andy's best panto roles
2014	Live from the Heart of the West Country	Stand-up	Live stand-up comedy
2014	Stand-up for Yourself	Educational	A DVD on the art of stand-up comedy
2015	Dick Whittington: LIVE	Pantomime	Live performance starring Andy Ford and ensemble
2017	Live and Gert-Lush	Stand-up	Live stand-up comedy
2018	50 Years And Counting	Documentary	A retrospective look at the life of Andy Ford
2018	The Best Of Andy Ford	Compilation	A collection of career highlights

== Music career ==
Ford was the lead singer of a band for many years before going solo, in 1983 he released The Andrew Ford Album on cassette published by Tabitha Music. He then later released the single "Pillow Talk" in the mid-1980s. He released his second album, "Love and Stuff", along with the single "Only Wanna Make Things Right", before turning to stage work.
