= Peter Denyer =

English actor (1947–2009)

- Born: Peter John Denyer; 20 August 1947; Dartford, Kent, England
- Died: 18 September 2009 (aged 62); Cheltenham, Gloucestershire, England
- Occupation: Actor
- Years active: 1966–2009

Peter John Denyer (20 August 1947 – 18 September 2009) was an English actor who played Dennis Dunstable in London Weekend Television's Please Sir!, and its spin-off series The Fenn Street Gang, taking on the role of a teenager when already into his 20s. He also appeared in the film versions of Please Sir! (1971) and Never Mind the Quality, Feel the Width (1973), and the glam rock film Never Too Young to Rock (1976).

Another semi-regular role, again for LWT, was as one half of a gay couple in Agony.

He played the boring, jilted Ralph Dring in Dear John. Noted for his motor-cycle combination and 'mobile discothèque' with one record - Green Door by Shakin' Stevens

He also appeared in Dixon of Dock Green, Moody and Pegg, and the TV soap opera Emmerdale Farm, The Bill. Later in his career he moved into producing, directing and writing pantomime.

Denyer, who was unmarried, died in September 2009 in Cheltenham, aged 62.

== Filmography ==
Year	Title	Role	Notes
1968 - 1971	Please Sir!	Dennis Dunstable	35 episodes
1970	Father Dear Father	Youth	Episode: "It's Never Too Late"
1971	Please Sir!	Dennis Dunstable	Film
1971 - 1973	The Fenn Street Gang	Dennis Dunstable	28 episodes
1973	Never Mind the Quality, Feel the Width	Lad	Film
1974	Moody and Pegg	George	5 episodes
1974	Crown Court	Peter Fisher	Episode: "Pot of Basil" (3 parts)
1975	Dixon of Dock Green	Phil Bremmer	Episode: "Baubles, Bangles and Beads"
1976	Never Too Young to Rock	Hero	Film
1979	Emmerdale	Neil 'Batty' Batt	6 episodes
1979 - 1981	Agony	Michael	14 episodes
1980	How's Your Father	Vet	Episode: "The One That Got Away"
1981	Thicker Than Water	Malcolm Lockwood	6 episodes
1986 - 1987	Dear John	Ralph	14 episodes
1989	The Bill	Radford	Episode: "A Good Result"
1990	On the Up	Mr. Burton	Episode: "Mr. Burton"
1993	The Bill	Mike Baker	Episode: "Morning Has Broken"

== Discography ==
1973 - Just Another Minute
