= The Stick Up =

- Directed by: Jeffrey Bloom
- Screenplay by: Jeffrey Bloom
- Produced by: George Pappas
- Starring: David Soul; Pamela McMyler; Johnnie Wade; Michael Balfour
- Cinematography: Michael Reed
- Edited by: Peter Weatherley
- Music by: Michael J. Lewis
- Production company: Backstage Productions
- Release date: 1977
- Running time: 101 minutes
- Country: United Kingdom
- Language: English

The Stick Up is a 1977 British romantic comedy crime film written and directed by Jeffrey Bloom and starring David Soul. It was executive produced by Elliott Kastner.

== Cast ==
- David Soul as Duke Turnbeau
- Pamela McMyler as Rosie McCratchit
- Johnnie Wade as Smiley
- Michael Balfour as Sam
- Michael McStay as mechanic
- Tony Melody as first policeman
- Norman Jones as second policeman
- Mike Savage as lorry driver
- Gordon Gostelow as farmer
- Connie Vascott as farmer's wife
- Leslie Hardy as farmer's child
- Julie May as prison matron
- Nosher Powell as manager
- Alan Tilvern as Richie
- Robert Longden as second roadblock policeman

== Production ==
It was one of the first films from financier Arnon Milchan although he felt the film was so bad he had his name removed from the credits.

The film was known during production as Mud.

== Reception ==
Variety wrote: "The Stick Up is a slow to medium-paced meller about a Yank fortune seeker's misadventures in 1930s England. It combines the box-office appeal of TV's David Soul, herein star-billed, with a passable romantic comedy plot, written and directed by Jeffrey Bloom. Lush green England countryside where it was shot is impressively captured by Michael Reed's camera ... Lensed in the style of a Bonnie Clyde or Paper Moon, the opus relies heavily on the chemistry of Soul and Pamela McMyler. ... Bloom's direction divides between Keystone Kops at one extreme and something much more sophisticated at the other. It resultantly succeeds well in neither and apart from its sometimes exceptional photography and an excellent score by Michael J. Lewis, it's bereft of distinction."

Screen International wrote: "This is an attempt to make a film set in the 1930s in the style of a movie of the period. But there's more to period pastiche than the right clothes, a few topical references to the Jubilee, and verifiable facts about money. The mood of the film is too heavy for a lighthearted romantic comedy adventure. David Soul and Pamela McMyler snap and snarl at each other with the humourless aggro of today; the spirited cut and thrust of a Clark Gable and Carole Lombard evades them. There's precious little fun or neighbourliness in this fictional England of 1935; even the comedy cops are meanly corrupt. As for the story, it stumbles from incident to incident like a drunk in wellies who insists on telling you the story of his life in boring detail."
