= Moby Dick (musical) =

Poster for the original Old Fire Station production

Moby Dick is a musical with a book by Robert Longden, and music and lyrics by Longden and Hereward Kaye, first staged in 1990. The plot follows the anarchic and nubile girls of St. Godley's Academy for Young Ladies who, determined to save the institution from bankruptcy, decide to stage Herman Melville's classic 1851 novel in the school's swimming pool. The musical is a mixture of high camp, music hall-style smut, and wild anachronism overflowing with double entendres; the lead role of headmistress/Captain Ahab is portrayed by a man in drag.

Originally produced as Moby Dick: A Whale of a Tale, and alternatively known as Moby Dick! The Musical, or Moby!, the show has proven to be a popular choice with regional theatre groups. Since 2003 a more Americanized version deleted the unfamiliar British references and played down many of the burlesque aspects.

== Initial productions ==
Producer Cameron Mackintosh, having become involved with the restoration of Oxford's Old Fire Station Theatre, sought a new musical to inaugurate the restored venue. Impressed by an audio tape sent him by Longden, Mackintosh offered £25,000 to stage Moby Dick: A Whale of a Tale. Originally an intimate piece with a cast of twelve performing with an upright piano, it became a greatly expanded version featuring a troupe of thirty and a six-piece band. The end result was a madcap romp, with veteran cabaret star Tony Monopoly playing the headmistress/Captain Ahab in drag, that immediately developed a cult following among the university students.

Following the stint at Oxford, the show was staged aboard the Old Profanity Showboat where after a slow start, the engagement quickly sold out.

== West End transfer ==
Against the advice of his staff, Mackintosh decided the show was suited for a full-fledged West End theatre production, and in March 1992 he transferred it to the cavernous Piccadilly Theatre, where it opened to almost universally scathing reviews. Despite an increasingly appreciative crowd and nightly ovations, the musical failed to find its audience quickly enough and the economics of the large venue forced it to close after four months. Such was its public appeal, Cameron later recalled, that the announcement of closure sent audience reaction into orbit and it barnstormed out of the West End as if it were one of the greatest hits of all time.

== American premiere ==
In 1993, Longdon directed the American premier in New Bedford, Massachusetts, where the original novel begins, and where Melville himself had worked as a whaler. The cast included Ed Dixon as headmistress/Ahab, Terri White as Ahab's wife, Cindy Marchionda as Ishmael, and Ellen D. Williams in the ensemble.

== Characters ==
- Elijah: a wacky, one-armed crew member of the Pequod who is a gossipmonger spreading rumors; doubles as Pierre and Janitor.
- Esta: a boy-crazy hussy and the smart aleck of the group; doubles as Ahab's wife.
- Father Mapple / Flask: as Mapple, a flamboyant, revival-type preacher; as Flask, a crew member on the Pequod who tries to steal Queequeg's money.
- Gardiner / Dagoo: as Gardiner, Captain of the Rachel with a penchant for classical comedy; doubles as Dagoo.
- Headmistress / Captain Ahab: the Headmistress is a stern and uptight ruler over the academy (played in drag with fearless confidence); doubles as Captain Ahab.
- Ishmael: the story's narrator, she is a goody two-shoes who everyone picks on; an earnest, but nerdy, musician and student.
- Pip: the school's puny security guard and cabin boy aboard the Pequod who is smaller and weaker than the others.
- Queequeg: the mystical, strange, savage harpooner who is tender and kind underneath it all; a cannibal of sorts.
- Starbuck: the stern and strong girl that the others look up to; she is very Christian, upright and fair.
- Stubb: a very ditzy girl; the second mate of the ship.

The Ensemble play Sailors, Shrunken Heads, Wives, Heathens, and Ghosts.

== Musical numbers ==
Original song list

Act I

- Hymn
- Parents' Day
- Forbidden Seas
- In Old Nantucket
- A Man Happens
- Ahab's Curse
- Gypsy Dancer
- Love Will Always
- Primitive
- Punish Us
- People Build Walls
- Pequod
- At Sea One Day
- Building America

Act II

- Living Shadows
- Mr. Starbuck
- Heave Away
- Deck Dance
- Can't Keep Out the Night
- Ahab's Insomnia
- A Whale of Tale
- Daily Massacre
- Ship Ahoy
- Shadows of the Deep
- Storm
- Heave Away (Reprise)
- The Whale's Revenge
- Save the Whale

2003 song list

Act I

- School Hymn
- Moby Dick
- I Live and Breathe
- Old Nantucket Town
- A Man Happens
- Ahab's Homecoming
- Love Will Always
- Primitive
- A Sinking Man
- Jonah Fell
- Pequod
- At Sea One Day
- Building America

Act II

- Moby Dick (Reprise)
- Deck Dance/Death to Moby/Heave Away
- Can't Keep Out the Night
- Whale of a Tale
- Love Will Always (Reprise)
- The Rachel/Shadows of the Deep
- Bones
- Heave 2
- Ahab's Death
- Death of Ahab
- Finale!
