= Moody and Pegg =

British television comedy-drama series (1974–75)

- DVD cover
- Directed by: Jonathan Alwyn; Richard Martin; Baz Taylor; Roger Tucker; Mike Vardy
- Starring: Judy Cornwell; Derek Waring
- Country of origin: United Kingdom
- No. of series: 2
- No. of episodes: 12

Production
- Running time: 60 minutes per episode

Original release
- Network: ITV
- Release: 29 June 1974 – 28 August 1975

Moody and Pegg is a British comedy-drama, produced by Thames Television for ITV between 1974 and 1975. Written by Donald Churchill and Julia Jones, the series starred Derek Waring and Judy Cornwell.

Waring played Roland Moody, a newly divorced antiques dealer greatly anticipating freedom from matrimonial ties. Cornwell was cast as Daphne Pegg, plain spinster and dedicated civil servant in her early thirties who leaves her home in Bolton after realising that her office boss will never agree to marry her. She heads for London in order to make a clean break from her past, but, owing to a rogue estate agent's dealings, finds that a man – Moody – also has a valid lease arrangement for the property she acquires. Unable to work out who is the squatter, they agree to be feuding partners and share, forging a very uncomfortable situation that is exacerbated by Moody's prodigious line of visiting girlfriends. Eventually, Moody loses in a winner-takes-all poker game and leaves, only to return in the second series.

The title theme was "The Free Life" by Alan Parker.

== Cast ==
- Judy Cornwell as Daphne Pegg
- Derek Waring as Roland Moody
- Frances Bennett as Monica Bakewell
- Tony Selby as Sid
- Sheila Keith as Aunt Ethel
- Peter Denyer as George
- Adrienne Posta as Iris

== DVD release ==
DVD	Release date
The Complete Series 1	15 March 2010
The Complete Series 2	27 June 2011
