= Agony (TV series) =

British television series

- Agony main title screen featuring Maureen Lipman as Jane Lucas
- Genre: Sitcom
- Created by: Len Richmond; Anna Raeburn
- Starring: Maureen Lipman; Simon Williams; Maria Charles; Peter Blake; Jeremy Bulloch; Peter Denyer; Diana Weston; Jan Holden; Bill Nighy
- Country of origin: United Kingdom
- Original language: English
- No. of series: 3
- No. of episodes: 20

Production
- Running time: 30 minutes
- Production company: London Weekend Television

Original release
- Network: ITV
- Release: 11 March 1979 – 1 March 1981

Agony is a British sitcom that aired on ITV from 11 March 1979 to 1 March 1981. Made by London Weekend Television, it stars Maureen Lipman as Jane Lucas who has a successful career as an agony aunt but whose own personal life is a shambles. It was created by Len Richmond and real-life agony aunt Anna Raeburn, both of whom wrote all of the first series. The second and third series were written by Stan Hey and Andrew Nickolds.

Agony was the first British sitcom to portray a gay couple as non-camp, witty, and intelligent people.

== Cast ==
- Maureen Lipman as Jane Lucas
- Simon Williams as Laurence Lucas
- Maria Charles as Bea Fisher
- Peter Blake as Andy Evol
- Jeremy Bulloch as Rob
- Peter Denyer as Michael
- Diana Weston as Val Dunn
- Jan Holden as Diana
- Robert Gillespie as Mr. Mince (Series 1)
- Robert Austin as Junior Truscombe (series 2 and 3)
- Bill Nighy as Vincent Fish (series 2)
- Josephine Welcome as Indira Patel (Series 2)

== Premise ==
Jane Lucas is an agony aunt, who is highly successful in her career working at radio call-in show (for Happening Radio 242) in London and writing the "Dear Jane" advice column for Person magazine, but whose own marriage and personal life is not without its problems. Her Jewish mother, Bea, interferes in all aspects of her life, and her gentile psychiatrist husband Laurence is unreliable and straying during the course of their on/off relationship. Jane's friends and colleagues include her assistant Val, her boss Diana, and her gay neighbours Rob and Michael, all of whom come to her with problems of their own. Meanwhile, Jane has to contend with the constant advances of the radio disc jockeys Andy Evol and Vincent Fish with whom she works.

Although a sitcom, Agony often included subjects in its storylines that were considered taboo at the time, such as drug use, racism, and homosexuality, and often included darker, more dramatic storylines such as Jane being held hostage, the suicide of one of her friends, and the abduction of her newborn baby.

== Reception ==
Writing in The Guardian, television critic Nancy Banks-Smith praised the series, describing it as "a wide-awake, wise-cracking comedy with a cracking good comedienne in Maureen Lipman" and that "the one-liners are one a second, fast and fresh and funny."

== Episodes ==
Series	Episodes	Originally released	
Series	Episodes	First released	Last released
1	6	11 March 1979	29 April 1979
2	7	13 April 1980	25 May 1980
3	7	18 January 1981	1 March 1981

=== Series 1 (1979) ===
No. overall	No. in series	Title	Original release date
1	1	"Help"	11 March 1979
2	2	"An Unmarried Couple"	18 March 1979
3	3	"Conjugal Wrongs"	25 March 1979
4	4	"Wedlock, Deadlock"	8 April 1979
5	5	"Forever and Never"	15 April 1979
6	6	"Too Much Agony, Too Little Ecstasy"	29 April 1979

=== Series 2 (1980) ===
No. overall	No. in series	Title	Original release date
7	1	"Back to Reality"	13 April 1980
8	2	"Working Girls"	20 April 1980
9	3	"Coming Out... and Going in Again?"	27 April 1980
10	4	"Television Can Damage Your Health"	4 May 1980
11	5	"Problem Parents"	11 May 1980
12	6	"Second Time Around"	18 May 1980
13	7	"A Woman Alone"	25 May 1980

=== Series 3 (1981) ===
No. overall	No. in series	Title	Original release date
14	1	"From Here to Maternity"	18 January 1981
15	2	"Arrivals and Departures"	25 January 1981
16	3	"Hospital Romances"	1 February 1981
17	4	"Communications Breakdown"	8 February 1981
18	5	"Holy Wars"	15 February 1981
19	6	"Lucas v Lucas"	22 February 1981
20	7	"Rings Off Their Fingers"	1 March 1981

== Agony Again ==
Agony was revived in 1995, this time on the BBC as Agony Again; produced by the BBC after ITV turned it down; the revived version had originally been pitched to Radio 4, but was felt to have enough potential to again be a television production. In addition, Agony was remade for American television under the name The Lucie Arnaz Show, with Len Richmond as the writer. This ran for six episodes on CBS in 1985 and starred Lucie Arnaz.

== Home releases ==
All three series of Agony, including a 3-disc set of the complete series, have been released on DVD in the UK (Region 2) by Network DVD.

DVD	Release date
The Complete Series 1	5 November 2007
The Complete Series 2	25 April 2008
The Complete Series 3	17 August 2009
The Complete Series 1 to 3 Box set	5 October 2009
