= Just for the Record (Randall and Hopkirk (Deceased)) =

"Just for the Record"
- Randall and Hopkirk (Deceased) episode
- Episode no.: Season 1 Episode 6
- Directed by: Jeremy Summers
- Written by: Donald James
- Production code: 06
- Original air date: 26 October 1969

Guest appearances
- Ronald Radd; Olivia Hamnett; Nosher Powell; Danny Green; Jan Rossini

Episode chronology
← Previous "All Work and No Pay"	Next → "Murder Ain't What it Used to Be!"

"Just for the record" is the sixth episode of the 1969 ITC British television series Randall and Hopkirk (Deceased) starring Mike Pratt, Kenneth Cope and Annette Andre. The episode was first broadcast on 25 October 1969 on ITV. Directed by Jeremy Summers.

== Synopsis ==
What starts out as a simple chaperone assignment, quickly sees Randall and Hopkirk investigating the theft of an important document from the Public Record Office.

== Cast ==
- Mike Pratt as Jeff Randall
- Kenneth Cope as Marty Hopkirk
- Annette Andre as Jeannie Hopkirk
- Ronald Radd .... Pargiter
- Olivia Hamnett .... Anne Soames
- Nosher Powell .... Lord Dorking
- Danny Green .... Lord Surrey
- Jan Rossini .... Miss Moscow
- Michael Beint .... Senior Official
- Jack Woolgar .... Old Man
- Katya Wyeth .... Miss Budapest (as Kathja Wyeth)
- Clifford Cox .... Attendant
- Ken Watson .... Police Sergeant
