= Nosher Powell =

British boxer and actor (1928–2013)

- Born: George Frederick Bernard Powell; 15 August 1928; Camberwell, London, England
- Died: 20 April 2013 (aged 84); London, England
- Other name: Frederick Powell
- Occupations: Actor; Boxer; Stuntman
- Years active: 1944–2000
- Spouse: Pauline Wellman (m. 1951)
- Children: 2 sons
- Relatives: Dinny Powell (brother)

George Frederick Bernard Powell (15 August 1928 – 20 April 2013), credited as Nosher Powell, Freddie Powell, or Fred Powell, was an English actor, stuntman and boxer. He is best known for his work in the James Bond film series, most notably From Russia with Love (1963).

== Life and career ==
Powell was born in Camberwell, London, England. His younger brother, Dinny Powell (1932–2023) followed a similar career, acting and stunt co-ordinating many films, as have his sons Greg Powell and Gary Powell. Powell was given the nickname of "Nosher" while he served in the army. "Nosh" means food in Cockney slang and was given to Powell due to his large physique. He disliked his birth name Frederick or Freddie and chose to use Nosher Powell as his screen name.

Powell began his career as a heavyweight boxing champion in the worlds of unlicensed fighting and the professional arena. He also worked as a sparring partner for Joe Louis, Sugar Ray Robinson and Muhammad Ali, amongst others. The last fight of his career was against Menzies Johnson in 1960. Powell won the fight on points, over eight rounds. According to his autobiography, Powell had a total of seventy-eight fights: fifty-one as a professional, with nine losses, though he was never knocked out. Boxrec.com, though, lists Powell as losing sixteen times as a professional, with nine of those losses being by KO, two by TKO and five on points. Powell's boxing career was ended following injuries he sustained after being hit by a lorry in Covent Garden Market, where he was working as a porter. He later became a boxing instructor in Brixton.

Powell had an extensive but mostly uncredited career in stunt work and acting, including as stuntman in 14 James Bond films. Amongst his TV work was the role of the powerful thug Lord Dorking in Randall and Hopkirk (Deceased), in which was first broadcast on 26 October 1969.

In 1965 he appeared in The Saint (S4, E3: episode entitled "The Crooked Ring") as 'The Angel' a cheating boxer. The finale has The Angel fighting The Saint in the ring. Simon Templar demonstrates his boxing skills and knocks him out.

In 1966, Powell played a role of a jewel thief Charlie in the series The Baron.

In 1967 he appeared in The Saint (S5, E15: episode entitled "The Persistent Patriots") as Benson a patriot heavy, involved in a plot against the Prime Minister (Edward Woodward) of an African Colony. Once again he comes off worst against Simon Templar.

In 1967 he appeared in The Avengers episode entitled "Mission ... Highly Improbable" as Henrik with Denny Powell appearing as Karl.

On 26 April 1972 he was the subject of an episode in the UK version of This Is Your Life.

Powell later became the head of a collective of people dressing as medieval knights. Powell began the projects because of the lack of stunt work resulting from an industry-wide recession. In August 1971, Powell took part in a re-enactment of the battle at Senlac Hill in nylon armour. The event drew a crowd of ten thousand spectators. Powell and his group of knights concentrated on medieval practises such as Jousting. Powell and fellow stunt man Max Diamond also founded the British Jousting Society. In 1972, they began a British tour of the tournaments which were staged at Lichfield, Norwich, Edinburgh and the Tower of London. In the performances, Powell went by the character name of "Frederick of Gaywood". In 1975, Powell took his "Tournament of Knights" tour to the United States. He promoted his group's tour by walking through San Francisco in a jousting costume.

In 1987, Powell played a character who shared his name in the film, Eat the Rich. Powell was cast in the role by director Peter Richardson. Powell had known Richardson for some years and he wanted a stunt man who was willing to hang out of a helicopter and knew Powell would be willing. Powell later recalled that he worried the role would be recast if he could not give a good acting performance beyond his stunt work.

He also acted as a "minder" (bodyguard) for a number of celebrities, including John Paul Getty Jr. and Sammy Davis Jr.

== Personal life and death ==
In 1952 Powell married Pauline Wellman, and the couple had two sons, Greg and Gary, who also grew up to become stuntmen.

Powell died in his sleep on 20 April 2013 at the age of 84.

== Filmography ==
Acting credits:

- Oliver Twist (1948) - Undetermined Minor Role (uncredited)
- There Is Another Sun (1951) - Teddy Green
- Emergency Call (1952) - Boy Booth
- Cosh Boy (1953) - Instructor (uncredited)
- Demetrius and the Gladiators (1954) - Gladiator (uncredited)
- The Dark Avenger (1955) - (uncredited)
- King's Rhapsody (1955) - (uncredited)
- Violent Playground (1958)
- The Road to Hong Kong (1962) - Man (uncredited)
- Call Me Bwana (1963) - Man (uncredited)
- A Shot in the Dark (1964) - Man (uncredited)
- A Fistful of Dollars (1964) - Cowboy con cartel 'adios amigo' (uncredited)
- She (1965) - British Soldier (uncredited)
- The Saint (1965) - The Angel
- The Baron (1966) - Charlie
- Circus of Fear (1966) - Red
- The Sandwich Man (1966) - Nosher - Bus Driver (uncredited)
- The Saint (1967) - Benson
- Casino Royale (1967) - British Officer (uncredited)
- Oliver! (1968) - Man (uncredited)
- Crooks and Coronets (1969) - Casino Security (uncredited)
- School for Sex (1969) - Hector
- Randall and Hopkirk (Deceased) (1969) - Episode 6 - Just for the Record
- Crossplot (1969)
- The Magic Christian (1969) - Ike Jones (uncredited)
- One More Time (1970) - Man (uncredited)
- You Can't Win 'Em All (1970) - Horse Rider (uncredited)
- Venom (aka The Legend of Spider Forest) (1971) - Gang member
- On the Buses (1971) - Betty's Husband
- The Alf Garnett Saga (1972) - Ginger (uncredited)
- Nearest and Dearest (1972) - Bouncer
- The Mackintosh Man (1973) - Armed Guard
- Love Thy Neighbour (1973) - Bus Driver
- Carry on Dick (1974) - Footpad (uncredited)
- Brannigan (1975) - Man in Bar (uncredited)
- Never Too Young to Rock (1976)
- The Stick Up (1977) - Manager
- If You Go Down in the Woods Today (1981) - Govnor's Henchman
- Victor Victoria (1982) - Man in Bar (uncredited)
- Krull (1983) - Slayer in the Swamp (uncredited)
- Eat the Rich (1987) - Nosher Powell
- Willow (1988) - Nelwyn Villager (uncredited)
- Legionnaire (1998) - Soldier
- Shiner (2000) - Special Character (final film role)
