= Lonely This Christmas =

1974 single by Mud

Single by Mud
- B-side: "I Can't Stand It"
- Released: 22 November 1974
- Recorded: 1974
- Genre: Rock and roll, Christmas
- Length: 3:35
- Label: RAK
- Songwriters: Mike Chapman, Nicky Chinn
- Producers: Mike Chapman, Nicky Chinn

Mud singles chronology
"In The Mood" (1974)	"Lonely This Christmas" (1974)	"The Secrets That You Keep" (1975)

Music video
- "Lonely This Christmas" on YouTube

"Lonely This Christmas" is a Christmas song by the English glam rock band Mud, that topped the UK Singles Chart in 1974, selling more than 750,000 copies and reaching Christmas number one.

== Song ==
Written and produced by Nicky Chinn and Mike Chapman, "Lonely This Christmas" was Mud's second number one single in the UK, spending four weeks at the top in December 1974 and January 1975. It was the third number one single that year for the ChinniChap writing and production team, and was performed in the style of Elvis Presley's slower songs from his later career.

== Performances ==
The song was performed on Top of the Pops, with guitarist Rob Davis covered in tinsel and wearing Christmas baubles as earrings, while vocalist Les Gray sang to a ventriloquist's dummy.

== Charts ==
=== Weekly charts ===
Chart (1974)	Peak position
Belgium (Ultratop 50 Flanders)	1
Netherlands (Dutch Top 40)	1
Netherlands (Single Top 100)	1
UK Singles (Official Charts)	1
Chart (2024)	Peak position
Romania Airplay (TopHit)	56
Chart (2025)	Peak position
Croatia International Airplay (Top lista)	59
Romania Airplay (TopHit)	72

=== Monthly charts ===
Chart (2025)	Peak position
Romania Airplay (TopHit)	80

=== Year-end charts ===
Chart (1975)	Position
Belgium (Ultratop 50 Flanders)	69

== Certifications ==
Region	Certification	Certified units/sales
United Kingdom (BPI)	Platinum	600,000^{‡}
^{‡} Sales+streaming figures based on certification alone.

== Freezing This Christmas ==
"Freezing This Christmas"

Single by Sir Starmer and the Granny Harmers
- Released: 1 December 2024
- Recorded: 2024
- Genre: Christmas; parody; protest
- Length: 3:35
- Songwriter: Chris Middleton

Sir Starmer and the Granny Harmers singles chronology
"Freezing This Christmas" (2024)	"Fly Them Home for Christmas" (2025)

Music video
- "Freezing This Christmas" on YouTube

In December 2024, a parody version was released entitled "Freezing This Christmas". A backlash against the means-testing of the Winter Fuel Payment by the Labour government in July 2024, it had lyrics by Chris Middleton, a freelance writer from Newcastle, and was performed by Dean Ager, a singer and Frank Sinatra and Michael Bublé impersonator, under the name Sir Starmer and the Granny Harmers, with all proceeds going to elderly charities. In the week before Christmas, the cover reached number one in the Singles Downloads Chart and number 37 on the singles chart. The BBC received criticism from Middleton, as well as Conservative MP Greg Smith, for not playing the song, with it being skipped on Radio One's chart show.

Chart (2024)	Peak position
UK Singles (Official Charts)	37
UK Indie (Official Charts)	5
UK Singles Downloads (Official Charts)	1
