= Les Gray =

English musician (1946-2004)

Background information
- Born: Thomas Leslie Gray; 9 April 1946; Carshalton, Surrey, England
- Died: 21 February 2004 (aged 57) Lagos, Portugal
- Genre: Glam rock
- Occupations: Musician, singer-songwriter
- Instruments: Vocals, piano
- Years active: 1965–2004
- Formerly of: Mud

Thomas Leslie Gray (9 April 1946 – 21 February 2004) was an English musician, best known as the lead singer of glam rock pop band Mud. He was known for his distinctive vocal impersonation of Elvis Presley, as well as being a lifelong supporter of Leeds United.

== Early life and career ==
Gray was born in Carshalton, Surrey, in 1946. He was a self-taught musician, and during his school years he played trumpet with a jazz band, and then, with a younger brother, went on to form the skiffle unit The Mourners. After leaving school he worked for Pearl & Dean, writing commercials, and later for Moss Bros before finding success with Mud.

=== Mud ===
With a few line-up changes, The Mourners evolved into Mud in February 1966, with Gray on vocals, Dave Mount on drums, Rob Davis on guitar, and Ray Stiles on bass, and won the Search for Sound song contest the same year. After a few unsuccessful singles including "Flower Power", they were signed to Mickie Most's RAK record label, and gained television exposure via an appearance on The Basil Brush Show. They toured in support of Jack Jones in 1973. Mud had a string of hits written by Nicky Chinn and Mike Chapman, including two which topped the UK Singles Chart in 1974, "Lonely This Christmas", and "Tiger Feet", and, re-punctuated as Oh Boy, a chart-topping cover of "Oh, Boy!" (originally performed by Buddy Holly). They disbanded in 1979.

Gray later toured with backing musicians under the name Les Gray's Mud, but never found the same level of success as he had with the original version.

=== Solo work ===
Gray had a Top 40 solo hit (#32) in 1977 with his cover version of "A Groovy Kind of Love." He appeared as a guest in the 1979 TV series Jack Good's Oh Boy!. Also during the 1970s, he appeared in one of several public service announcements themed Be Smart, Be Safe, instructing children on how to safely cross a road.

== Personal life ==
In 1992, Gray moved with his wife Carol to live in the Algarve region of Portugal. He died on 21 February 2004, of a heart attack, whilst fighting throat cancer.

== Discography ==
=== Albums ===
- 1982: Mud Featuring Les Gray
- ????: Les Gray's Mud

=== Singles ===
- 1977: A Groovy Kind of Love b/w U.S. Style
- 1977: What Do You Want to Make Those Eyes at Me For? b/w Stand Still Stella
- 1979: I Think of You b/w I Think I'll Go That Way
- 1981: Rock on Elvis Medley (as Tulsa McLean)
  - The King of Rock And Roll, King Creole, Blue Suede Shoes, Hound Dog, Wooden Heart, Rock-A-Hula Baby, Got a Lot o' Livin' to Do!, (Let Me Be Your) Teddy Bear
  - The Songs of the King, Love Me Tender, Heartbreak Hotel, Are You Lonesome Tonight?, Can't Help Falling in Love, Crying in the Chapel, The Wonder of You, An American Trilogy
- 1982: Don't You Say It b/w Streetfighter

=== Additional Sings ===
- 1979 Quarter to Three
- 1979 Stagger Lee
