= Tiger Feet =

1974 single by Mud

Single by Mud

from the album Mud Rock
- B-side: "Mr Bagatelle"
- Released: 4 January 1974
- Recorded: 1973
- Genre: Glam rock
- Length: 3:45
- Label: RAK
- Songwriters: Mike Chapman, Nicky Chinn
- Producers: Mike Chapman, Nicky Chinn

Mud singles chronology
"Dyna-Mite" (1973)	"Tiger Feet" (1974)	"The Cat Crept In" (1974)

Official audio
- "Tiger Feet" on YouTube

Tiger Feet is a song by the English glam rock band Mud, released in January 1974. Written and produced by the songwriting team of Mike Chapman and Nicky Chinn, it was the first of three number No. 1 singles for the band, in the UK Singles Chart. followed later that year by "Lonely This Christmas", and then in 1975 by "Oh Boy!"

The band appeared on Top of the Pops wearing tiger-skin-patterned slippers.

== Release details ==
According to his son, Calvin Hayes, Mickie Most added the song to RAK records' lineup on the basis of the title alone.

The single was released on the 7-inch vinyl record format by the RAK music label. The B-side of the single is Mr Bagatelle.

"Tiger Feet" was featured as part of a medley on Mud's album Mud Rock, which reached number No. 8 in the UK Albums Chart.

== Chart position and sales ==
"Tiger Feet" was a huge success, it was number No. 1 in the UK and Ireland charts for four consecutive weeks, from 26 January to 16 February, in 1974 and also topped the charts in the Netherlands. It sold over 700,000 copies in the UK alone and over a million copies globally. It was also the best selling single in Britain that year.

=== Weekly charts ===
Chart (1974)	Peak position
Australia (Kent Music Report)	43
Austria (Ö3 Austria Top 40)	6
Belgium (Ultratop 50 Flanders)	1
Belgium (Ultratop 50 Wallonia)	3
Finland (Suomen virallinen lista)	15
France (IFOP)	55
Iceland (Morgunblaðið)	2
Ireland (IRMA)	1
Netherlands (Dutch Top 40)	1
Netherlands (Single Top 100)	1
New Zealand (Listener)	18
Norway (VG-lista)	10
Switzerland (Schweizer Hitparade)	5
United Kingdom (UK Singles Chart)	1
West Germany (GfK)	6

== Certifications ==
Certifications for "Tiger Feet"
Region	Certification	Certified units/sales
United Kingdom (BPI)	Gold	500,000^{^}
^{^} Shipments figures based on certification alone.

== Covers ==
A version of Tiger Feet was recorded by New Hope Club and appeared in Aardman's movie Early Man.

== See also ==
- List of Dutch Top 40 number-one singles of 1974
- List of number-one singles of 1974 (Ireland)
- List of number-one singles from the 1970s (UK)
