= Mud (band) =

British glam rock band

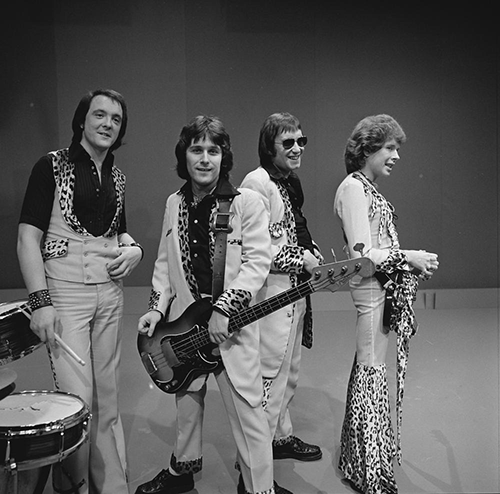
- Mud in 1974. From left to right: Dave Mount, Ray Stiles, Les Gray, Rob Davis.

Background information
- Also known as: Dum (1974); Ring (1979–1980)
- Origin: Carshalton, Greater London, England
- Genres: Glam rock; pop rock; rock and roll; rockabilly
- Years active: 1966–1980; 2015–present
- Labels: Rak; Private Stock; RCA
- Members: Rob Davis; Ray Stiles; Ian Parker; Keith Read; Paul Castleman
- Past members: Les Gray; Dave Mount; Andy Ball; Brian Tatum; Margo Buchanan

Mud II
- Also known as: Les Gray's Mud (1980–2004)
- Years active: 1980–present
- Members: Syd Twynham; Chris Savage; Marc Michalski; Chris Millward
- Past members: Les Gray; Stuart Amesbury; Cherie Beck; Dale Fry; Rob John; Nick Richie; Tim Fish; Mark Hatwood; Kevin Fairburn; John Berry; Wole Rother; Phil Wilson

Mud are an English glam rock band, formed in February 1966. Their earlier success came in a pop and then glam rock style, whilst later hits were influenced by 1950s rock and roll and rockabilly, and they are best remembered for their hit singles "Dyna-mite", "Tiger Feet", which was the UK's best-selling single of 1974, and "Lonely This Christmas" which reached Christmas number 1 in December 1974. After signing to Rak Records and teaming up with songwriters/producers Nicky Chinn and Mike Chapman, the band had fourteen UK Top 20 hits between 1973 and 1976, including three number ones.

== History ==
=== Mud ===
==== 1966–1972: the early years ====
The band was founded by lead guitarist Rob Davis, lead vocalist Les Gray, drummer Dave Mount (born 3 March 1947, Mitcham; died 2 December 2006, St Helier Hospital, Carshalton) and bassist Ray Stiles (born 20 November 1946, Guildford, Surrey).

The band released their debut single, Flower Power, on CBS in 1967 but were not immediately successful. Three further singles in 1967/68, "Up the Airy Mountain"/"The Latter Days", "Shangri-La"/"House on the Hill" and "Jumping Jehosophat"/"Won't Let It Go", made no impression on the UK Singles Chart.

The band appeared on The Basil Brush Show on BBC TV, and toured as support for Jack Jones.

==== 1973–1976: the golden years ====
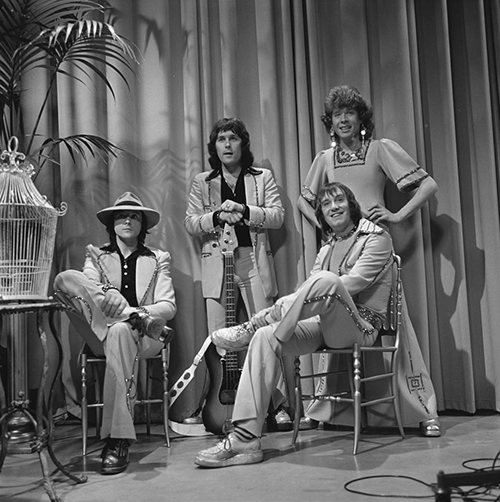
Mud in AVRO's TopPop (Dutch television show) in 1974

After years of unsuccessful singles, they were signed to Mickie Most's Rak label, and had three Top 20 successes in 1973 with "Crazy" (No. 12), "Hypnosis" (No. 16) and "Dyna-mite" (No. 4).

At the peak of their career they also enjoyed British number one singles with "Tiger Feet"; and "Lonely This Christmas" (1974), an affectionate Elvis Presley pastiche; plus "Oh Boy" (1975), a cover of the Buddy Holly hit, which also featured on their album Mud Rock Volume 2. "Tiger Feet" sold over 500,000 copies in the UK and a million copies globally.

Like contemporaries Sweet, their most successful period came when their records were written and produced by Nicky Chinn and Mike Chapman: in 1975 they had seven singles in the UK Top 40 totalling over 45 weeks on the chart, the most by any artist in 1975. "Oh Boy" was the only number-one single produced by Chinn and Chapman that they did not also write.

"Lonely This Christmas" got seasonal airplay on British radio and television, (along with Slade's "Merry Xmas Everybody" and Wizzard's "I Wish It Could Be Christmas Everyday"). The band also embraced the burgeoning disco craze, as exemplified on their 1976 single "Shake It Down" which reached No. 12 in the UK chart. After "Tiger Feet" they released "The Cat Crept In" which reached No. 2 in April 1974, which was written to exploit Les Gray's vocal impression of Presley. Their next single "Rocket" reached No. 6 in the UK, after which they released another track from their album Mud Rock Volume 1, a cover of "In the Mood". This was released under the band name "Dum" (which is both "Mud" spelt backwards and on a largely instrumental single, hence a pun on "dumb"), but it failed to chart.

After the success with "Lonely This Christmas", they cracked the Valentine's Day market with "The Secrets That You Keep", which reached No. 3 in February 1975. Around this time Mud wound up their contract with Rak releasing three further singles, "Oh Boy" (their third and final UK No. 1), "Moonshine Sally" (No. 10) and "One Night" (No. 32). Mud also split from Chinn and Chapman in mid-1975 and signed to Private Stock (licensed to Philips in Continental Europe). There they enjoyed three more British Top 20 hits within seven months: "L'L'Lucy" (No. 10), the ballad "Show Me You're a Woman" (No. 8) and the disco-influenced track "Shake It Down" (No. 12). The latter two singles saw them gradually moving away from glam rock, which was now unfashionable. Keyboardist Andy Ball, formerly of Candlewick Green, joined Mud in 1975 and was with the band during their time on the Private Stock label. Ball left the band in 1977 and was replaced by Brian Tatum.

Their last single to reach the British charts was a cover of the Bill Withers song "Lean on Me", which reached No. 7 in the UK in December 1976.

==== 1977–1980: downfall to disbanding ====
"Lean on Me" was followed by in 1977 Gray's solo version of "Groovy Kind of Love" on Warner Bros., which peaked at No. 32 in the UK. Also in 1977, with Private Stock in financial difficulties, the band moved to RCA. Their first single on RCA was "Slow Talking Boy", a folk rock song composed by John Kongos, and featuring Davis playing a Vox 12-string guitar-mandolin; they performed this song on BBC TV's Top of the Pops, but without reaping any chart success. Mud's next single, "(Just Try) A Little Tenderness", was their final appearance on any major national chart, stalling at No. 98 in Australia. Three more singles, all cover versions, followed in 1978 before RCA dropped the band and Gray quit for a solo career.

The original band continued for a short while with female lead vocalist Margo Buchanan in Gray's place, releasing a commercially unsuccessful single for Carrere in 1979 entitled "Drop Everything and Run". Another single with Margo Buchanan on lead vocals, "Rico", was released in 1980, this time under the band name "Ring" instead of "Mud". The band finally disbanded in 1980.

==== Aftermath ====
Following the band's dissolution, Stiles joined the Hollies whilst Davis went on to cowrite several highly successful dance hits for Kylie Minogue and Spiller featuring Sophie Ellis-Bextor. Drummer Mount went into the insurance business. Mount appeared on an episode of Never Mind the Buzzcocks on BBC Two in November 2005 and featured in the "spot the pop star of the past" identity parade segment. He had been married twice and worked as a salesman. His obituary appeared in The Independent newspaper. The last performance by the four original members was on 3 March 1990 at Dave Mount's wedding, a video recording of which was made by Mount.

=== 1980–2004: Les Gray's Mud ===
After the original band broke up in 1980, Gray reformed the band as 'Les Gray's Mud'. The initial lineup featured Stuart Amesbury (rhythm guitar) and Cherie Beck (backing vocals) of the Bristol-based Cherie Beck Band, together with Dale Fry (bass), Nick Richie (lead guitar) and Rob John (drums), the last two being replaced in 1983 by guitarist Tim Fish and drummer Mark Hatwood respectively.. In October 1982 Mud played a concert for Freshers Week at Leeds University. Mud played at Wadham College Oxford's May Ball in summer 1983. In 1985 a further lineup change saw Amesbury, Beck and Fry leave the band, with the new lineup being rounded out by Kevin Fairburn on bass.

In 1987 all members with the exception of Gray left the band and Gray brought in bassist John Berry, drummer Wole Rothe and guitarist Syd Twynham as replacements. Rothe and Twynham had both been members of Liquid Gold. This lineup lasted until 1998, when Rothe was replaced by Phil Wilson, and the band underwent no further changes until Gray died in 2004.

=== 2005–present: Mud II ===
Following Gray's death the three remaining members were given permission by the other founding members of Mud and Gray's family to continue using the band's name. Berry, Twynham and Wilson then renamed the band 'Mud II' and recruited keyboardist and long-term Mud collaborator Chris Savage. The following year Berry left (to focus on performing with Slade) and was replaced by Marc Michalski, creating a lineup of the band that continued until April 2023, when Chris Millward replaced Phil Wilson on drums.

Mount died on 2 December 2006, aged 59, apparently from suicide.

A short version of "Tiger Feet" was played at the opening ceremony of the 2012 Summer Olympics.

=== 2015–present: Mud revived ===
Since 2015 founder members Rob Davis and Ray Stiles have been performing together again under the band name 'Mud' and since 2026 alongside Ian Parker (Hollies), Keith Read (Wild Angles) and drummer Paul Castleman.

== Personnel ==
=== Members ===
Current members (Mud)

- Rob Davis - lead guitar, vocals (1966–1980, 2015–present)
- Ray Stiles - bass guitar, lead vocals (1966–1980, 2015–present)
- Ian Parker - keyboards and vocals (2015–present)
- Keith Read - rhythm guitar and vocals (2015–present)
- Paul Castleman - drums (2025–present)

Current members (Mud II)

- Syd Twynham - lead guitar, lead vocals (1987-present)
- Chris Savage - keyboards (2004-present)
- Marc Michalski - bass guitar (2005-present)
- Chris Millward - drums, percussion (2023-present)

Former members (Mud)

- Les Gray - lead vocals, keyboards (1966–1978, 1980–2004; his death)
- Dave Mount - drums, percussion (1966–1980; died 2006)
- Andy Ball - keyboards (1975–1977)
- Brian Tatum - keyboards (1977–1980)
- Margo Buchanan - lead vocals (1979–1980)

Former members (Les Gray's Mud / Mud II)

- Stuart Amesbury - rhythm guitar (1980–1985)
- Cherie Beck - backing vocals (1980–1985)
- Dale Fry - bass guitar (1980–1985)
- Rob John - drums, percussion (1980–1983)
- Nick Richie - lead guitar (1980–1983)
- Tim Fish - lead guitar (1983–1987)
- Mark Hatwood - drums, percussion (1983–1987)
- Kevin Fairburn - bass guitar (1985–1987)
- John Berry - bass guitar (1987–2005)
- Wole Rother - drums, percussion (1987–1998)
- Phil Wilson - drums, percussion (1998-2023)

=== Lineups ===
1966-1975	1975-1977	1977-1978	1979
Rob Davis - lead guitar; Les Gray - lead vocals, keyboards; Dave Mount - drums, percussion; Ray Stiles - bass guitar, lead vocals	Rob Davis - lead guitar; Les Gray - lead vocals, keyboards; Dave Mount - drums, percussion; Ray Stiles - bass guitar, lead vocals; Andy Ball - keyboards	Rob Davis - lead guitar; Les Gray - lead vocals, keyboards; Dave Mount - drums, percussion; Ray Stiles - bass guitar, lead vocals; Brian Tatum - keyboards	Rob Davis - lead guitar; Dave Mount - drums, percussion; Ray Stiles - bass guitar, lead vocals; Brian Tatum - keyboards; Margo Buchanan - lead vocals
1979-1980 (Ring)	1980-1983 (Les Gray's Mud)	1983-1985 (Les Gray's Mud)	1985-1987 (Les Gray's Mud)
Rob Davis - lead guitar; Dave Mount - drums, percussion; Ray Stiles - bass guitar, lead vocals; Brian Tatum - keyboards; Margo Buchanan - lead vocals	Les Gray - lead vocals, keyboards; Stuart Amesbury - rhythm guitar; Cherie Beck - backing vocals; Dale Fry - bass guitar; Rob John - drums, percussion; Nick Richie - lead guitar	Les Gray - lead vocals, keyboards; Stuart Amesbury - rhythm guitar; Cherie Beck - backing vocals; Dale Fry - bass guitar; Tim Fish - lead guitar; Mark Hatwood - drums, percussion	Les Gray - lead vocals, keyboards; Tim Fish - lead guitar; Mark Hatwood - drums, percussion; Kevin Fairburn - bass guitar
1987-1998 (Les Gray's Mud)	1998-2004 (Les Gray's Mud)	2004-2005 (Mud II)	2005–2023 (Mud II)
Les Gray - lead vocals, keyboards; John Berry - bass guitar; Wole Rother - drums, percussion; Syd Twynham - lead guitar	Les Gray - lead vocals, keyboards; John Berry - bass guitar; Syd Twynham - lead guitar; Phil Wilson - drums, percussion	John Berry - bass guitar; Syd Twynham - lead guitar, lead vocals; Phil Wilson - drums, percussion; Chris Savage - keyboards	Syd Twynham - lead guitar, lead vocals; Phil Wilson - drums, percussion; Chris Savage - keyboards; Marc Michalski - bass guitar
2015–present (Mud)	2023–present (Mud II)
Rob Davis - lead guitar, vocals; Ray Stiles - bass guitar, lead vocals; Ian Parker - keyboards, vocals; Keith Read - rhythm guitar; Paul Castleman - drums	Syd Twynham - lead guitar, lead vocals; Chris Savage - keyboards; Marc Michalski - bass guitar; Chris Millward - drums, percussion

== Discography ==
Studio albums

- Mud Rock (1974)
- Mud Rock Vol. II (1975)
- Use Your Imagination (1975)
- It's Better Than Working (1976)
- Rock On (1978)
- As You Like It (1979)
- Mud Featuring Les Gray (1982)
