= Dyna-mite =

Single by Mud
- B-side: "Do It All Over Again"
- Released: 5 October 1973
- Recorded: 1973
- Genre: Glam rock
- Length: 2:57
- Label: RAK
- Songwriters: Mike Chapman, Nicky Chinn
- Producers: Mike Chapman, Nicky Chinn

Mud singles chronology
"Hypnosis" (1973)	"Dyna-mite" (1973)	"Tiger Feet" (1974)

Music video
- "Dyna-mite" on TopPop on YouTube

"Dyna-mite" is a 1973 single, written by the songwriting team of Mike Chapman and Nicky Chinn. It was originally written for the Sweet, who rejected it, and later inherited by the English glam rock band Mud. Chapman and Chinn produced the song as well.

== Chart performance ==
The song was a "catchy rocker" that became a top five hit in the UK Singles Chart reaching number four in October 1973. It topped the charts in the Netherlands in 1974.

== Other information ==
The single was released on 7" vinyl record format by the RAK music label. The B-side was "Do It All Over Again". In Australia, the single was released by RAK as "Dynamite", without the hyphen in the title.

The song is featured in the soundtrack of the 2013 film Rush.

A cover of the song, performed by Matthew Porretta, occurs in the 2019 videogame Control.

== Chart positions ==
=== Weekly charts ===
Chart (1974)	Peak position
Austria (Hitradio Ö3)	8
Belgium (Ultratop 50 Flanders)	2
Iceland (Vísir)	3
Ireland (IRMA)	9
Finland (Suomen virallinen lista)	19
Netherlands (Dutch Top 40)	1
Netherlands (Single Top 100)	1
South African Singles Chart	5
United Kingdom (UK Singles Chart)	4
West Germany (GfK)	37

=== Year-end charts ===
Chart (1974)	Position
Belgium (Ultratop Flanders)	17
Netherlands (Dutch Top 40)	4
Netherlands (Single Top 100)	3

== Certifications ==
Certifications for "Dyna-mite"
Region	Certification	Certified units/sales
United Kingdom (BPI)	Silver	250,000^{^}
^{^} Shipments figures based on certification alone.
