= Greatest Hits (Bay City Rollers album) =

Compilation album by Bay City Rollers
- Released: November 1977
- Genre: Pop
- Length: 33:31
- Label: Arista
- Producers: Jimmy Ienner; Phil Wainman; Colin Frechter; Harry Maslin

Bay City Rollers chronology
Dedication (1976)	Greatest Hits (1977)	It's a Game (1977)

Greatest hits is a 1977 Arista Records compilation album by the Bay City Rollers. It includes songs from five of their first seven studio albums.

== Critical reception ==
Professional ratings
Review scores
Source	Rating
AllMusic	4/5 stars
Robert Christgau	C+

Chris Woodstra of AllMusic writes, "the Rollers' music has an enduring innocence and charm with enough catchy hooks and pure pop melodies to compete with other power-pop bands of the era."

Robert Christgau gives the album a C+ and begins his unfavorable review with, "Rollermania in this country was pretty depressing." His review did not improve any after that beginning.

== Track listing ==
No.	Title	Writer(s)	Original album	Length
1.	"I Only Want to Be with You"	Ivor Raymonde; Michael Hawker	Dedication (US 1976) / Non-album single (UK 1976)	3:33
2.	"Money Honey"	Eric Faulkner; Stuart Wood	Rock n' Roll Love Letter (US 1976) / Dedication (UK 1976)	3:14
3.	"Rock and Roll Love Letter"	Tim Moore	Rock n' Roll Love Letter	2:54
4.	"The Way I Feel Tonight"	Harvey Shield	It's a Game (1977)	3:50
5.	"Yesterday's Hero"	Harry Vanda; George Young	Dedication	3:50
6.	"Dedication"	Guy Fletcher; Doug Flett	Dedication	3:54
7.	"Maybe I'm a Fool to Love You"	Eric Faulkner; Stuart Wood	Wouldn't You Like It? (1975)	3:52
8.	"You Made Me Believe in Magic"	Len Boone	It's a Game	2:40
9.	"Don't Stop the Music"	Eric Faulkner; Stuart Wood	Wouldn't You Like It?	2:51
10.	"Saturday Night"	Phil Coulter; Bill Martin	Rollin' (1974)	2:53
Total length:				33:31

Track information and credits adapted from the album's liner notes.

== Musicians ==
- Bay City Rollers
  - Eric Faulkner – Guitar, violin, mandolin, bass
  - Alan Longmuir – Bass guitar, accordion, piano
  - Derek Longmuir – Drums, congas, tambourine
  - Les McKeown – Lead vocals, guitar
  - Stuart "Woody" Wood – Guitar, bass, piano, mandolin

== Production ==
- Jimmy Ienner – Producer (tracks 1, 5–6)
- Phil Wainman – Producer (tracks 2, 7, 9)
- Colin Frechter – Producer (track 3)
- Harry Maslin – Producer (tracks 4, 8)
- Bill Martin & Phil Coulter – Producer (track 10)
- Mastered By – Bill Inglot, Ken Perry
- Gary Hertz – Liner Notes
- Bill Inglot – Digital Compilation, Digital Mastering
- Ken Perry – Digital Compilation, Digital Mastering
- Cover photos courtesy of 16 Magazine

== Charts ==
Chart	Peak position	Certifications
Canadian Albums Chart	92	
German Albums Chart	39	
Japan Oricon Albums chart	10	
US Billboard 200	77	Gold
