= The Masked Singer (German TV series) season 1 =

The Masked Singer
- Season 1
- Starring: Collien Ulmen-Fernandes; Max Giesinger; Ruth Moschner; Various guests
- Hosted by: Matthias Opdenhövel
- No. of contestants: 10
- Winner: Max Mutzke as "Astronaut"
- Runner-up: Gil Ofarim as "Grashüpfer"
- No. of episodes: 6

Release
- Original network: ProSieben
- Original release: 27 June – 1 August 2019

Season chronology
- Next → Season 2

The first season of the German singing competition The Masked Singer premiered on 27 June 2019 on ProSieben. The panelists were Collien Ulmen-Fernandes, Max Giesinger and Ruth Moschner. The host was Matthias Opdenhövel.

On 1 August 2019, the Astronaut (singer Max Mutzke) was declared the winner and the Grashüpfer (singer Gil Ofarim) was the runner-up.

== Panelists and host ==
Season 1 panelists and host

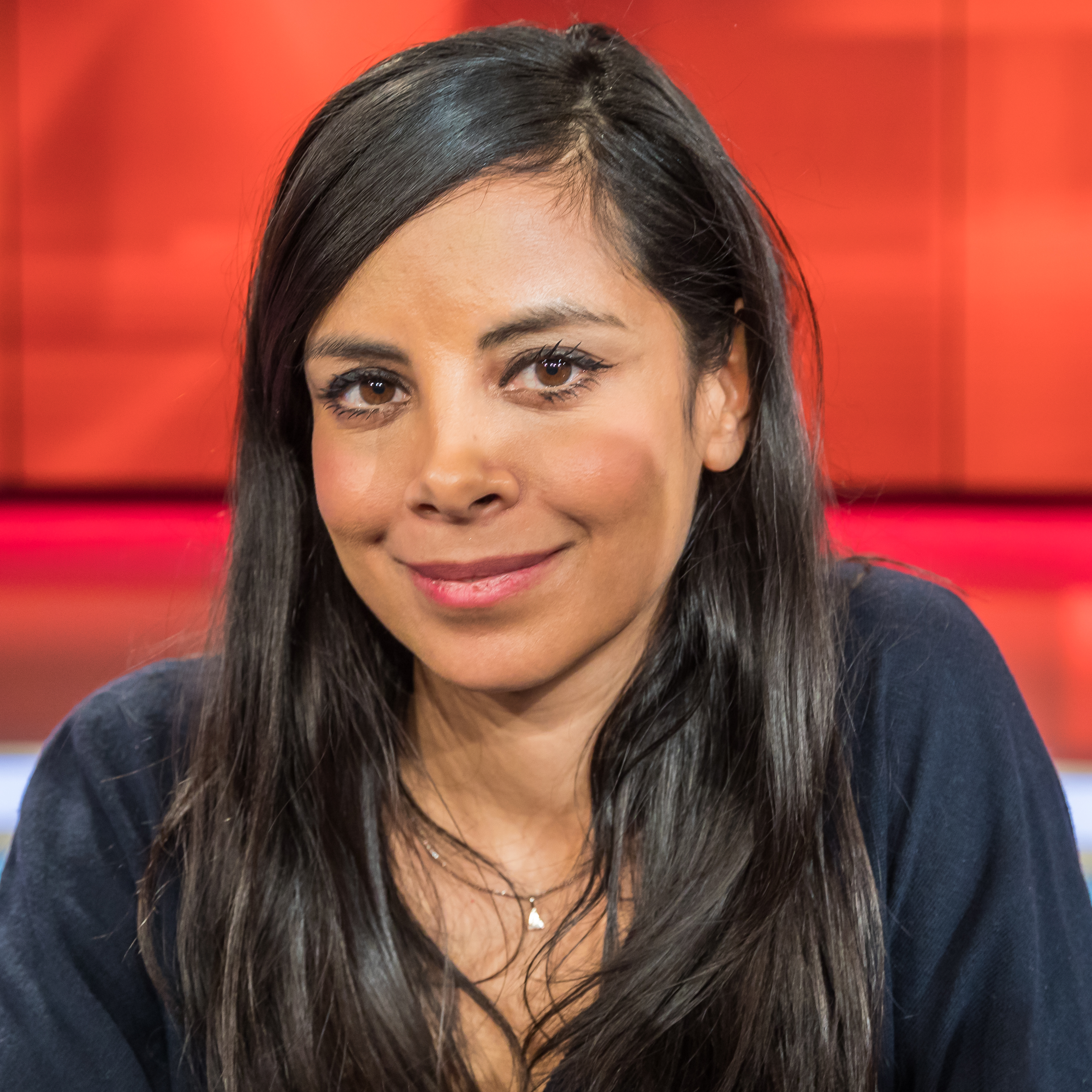
Collien Ulmen-Fernandes

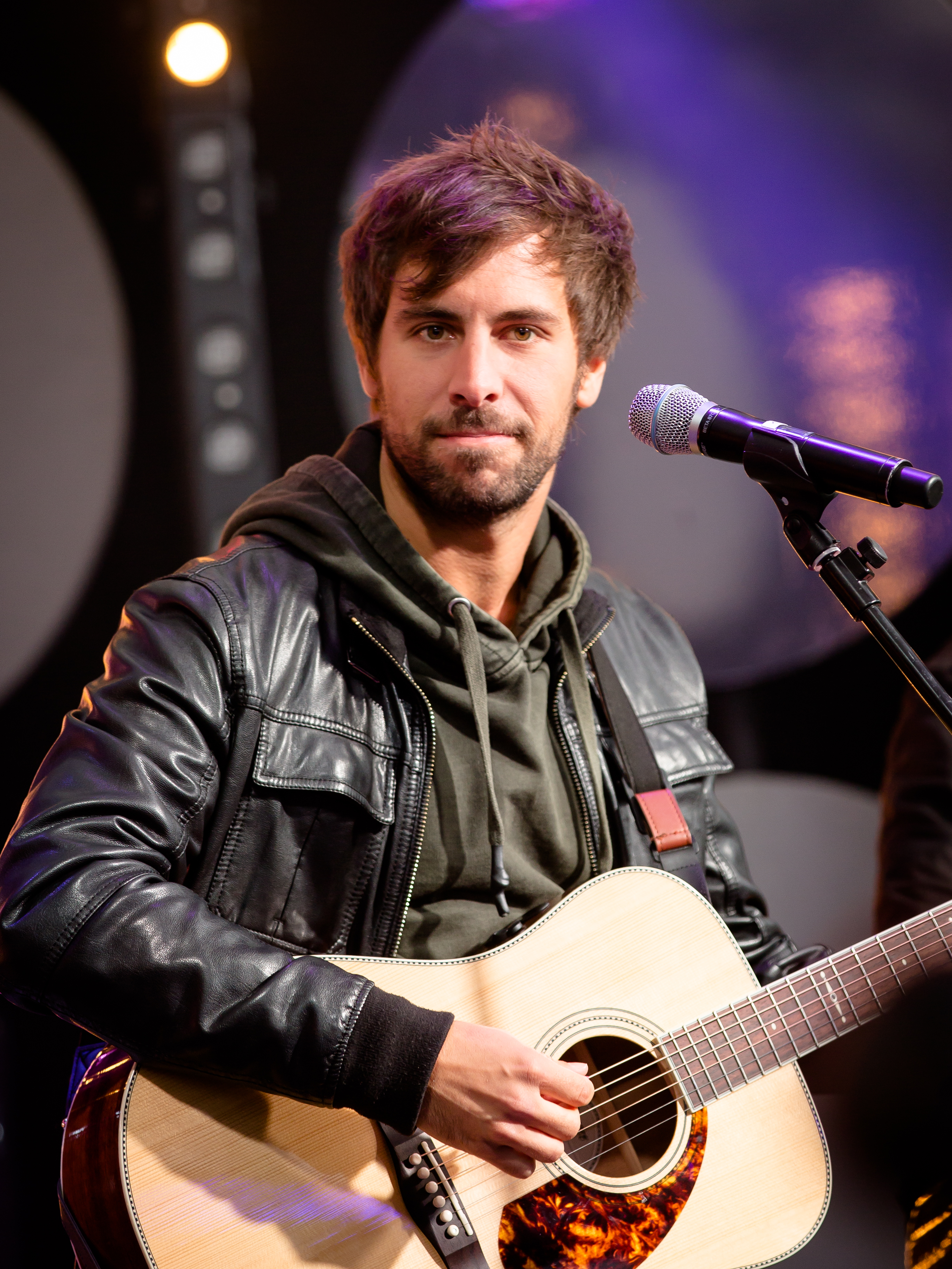
Max Giesinger

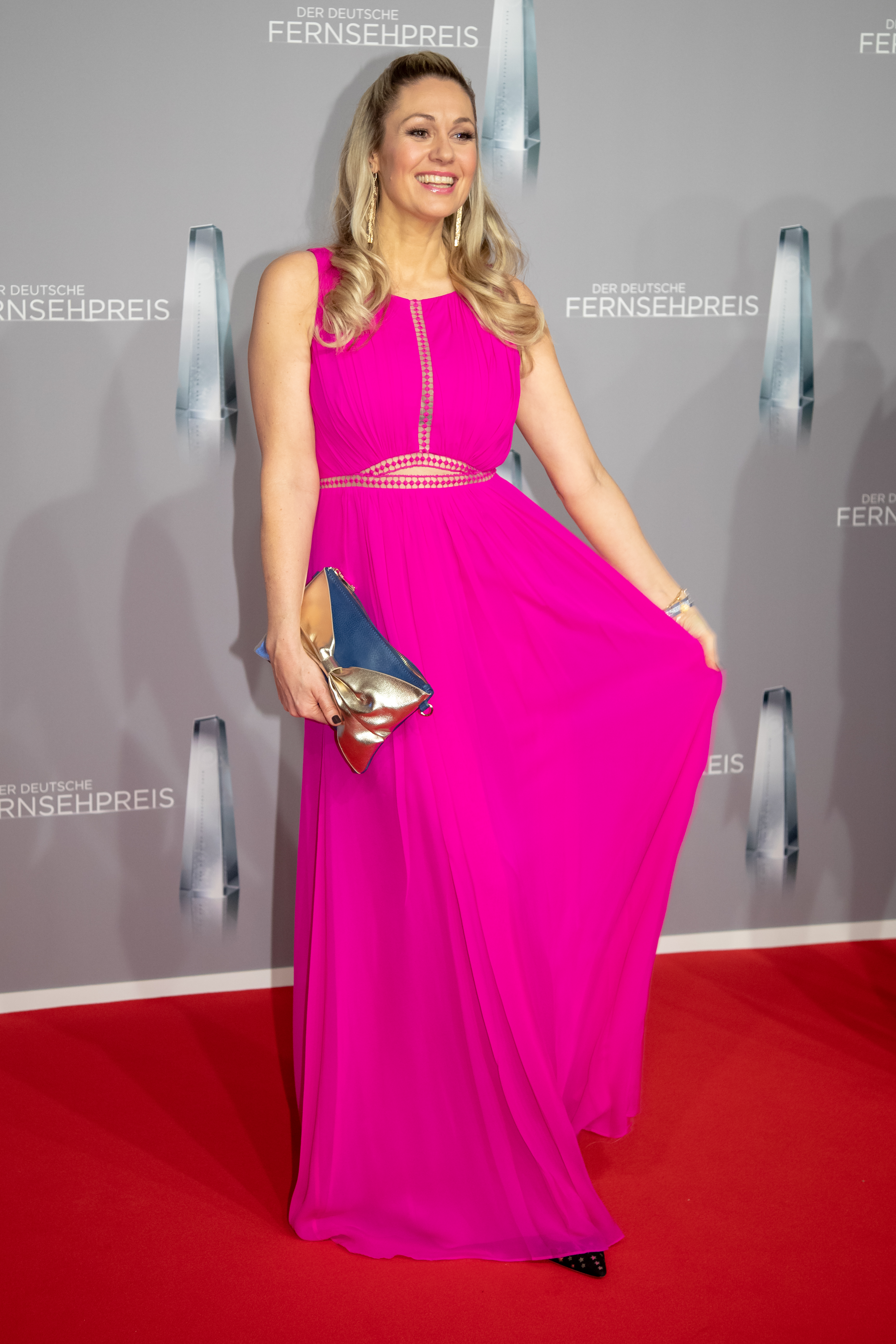
Ruth Moschner

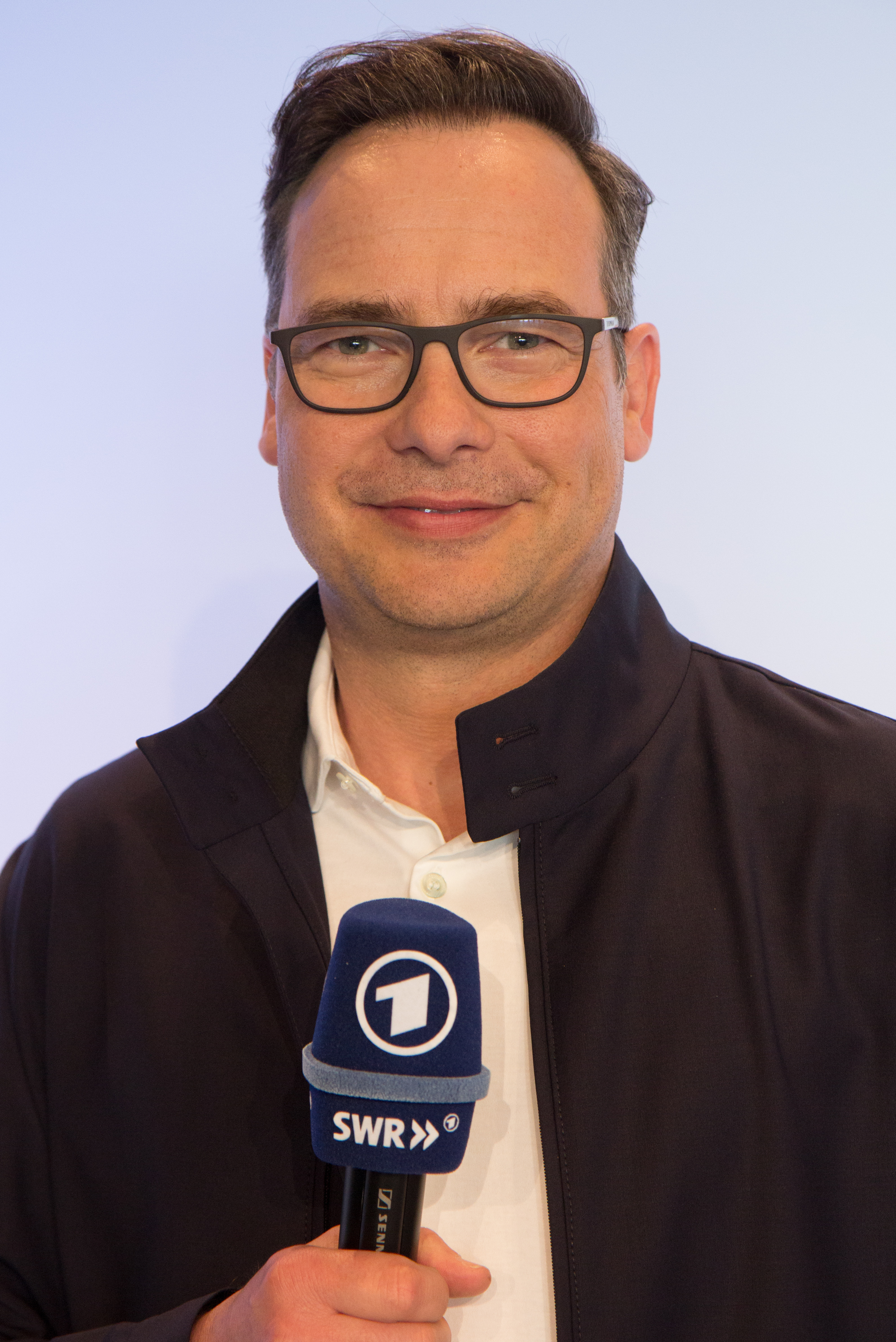
Matthias Opdenhövel

Following the announcement of the series, it was confirmed by ProSieben on 16 May 2019 that Matthias Opdenhövel would host the show. On 17 June 2019 it was confirmed by the channel that the rateteam or panelists would consist of actor Collien Ulmen-Fernandes, singer Max Giesinger and TV presenter Ruth Moschner.

After every live episode, was aired a spin-off show with the name The Masked Singer - red. Special, the hosts were Viviane Geppert (episodes 1, 3 and 5) and Annemarie Carpendale (episodes 2, 4 and 6). The show features interviews from the judges and the unmasked celebrity from that episode. In the Final Carpendale hosted also, the red. - The Masked Singer Countdown, which aired for 15 minutes before the final.

=== Guest panelists ===
Throughout the season, various guest panelists appeared as the fourth judge in the judging panel for one episode. These guest panelists included:

Season 1 guest panelists

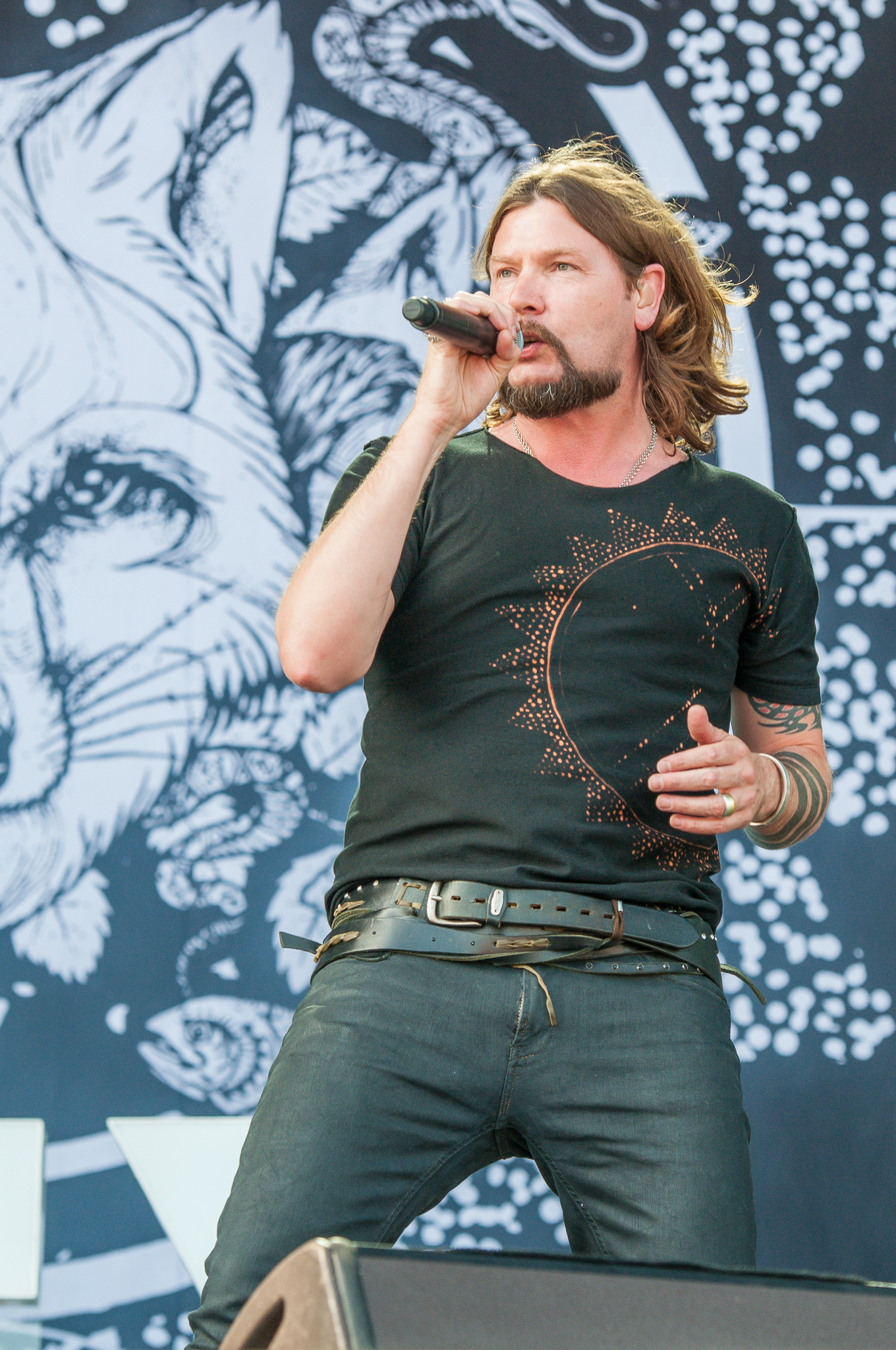
Rea Garvey (episode 1)

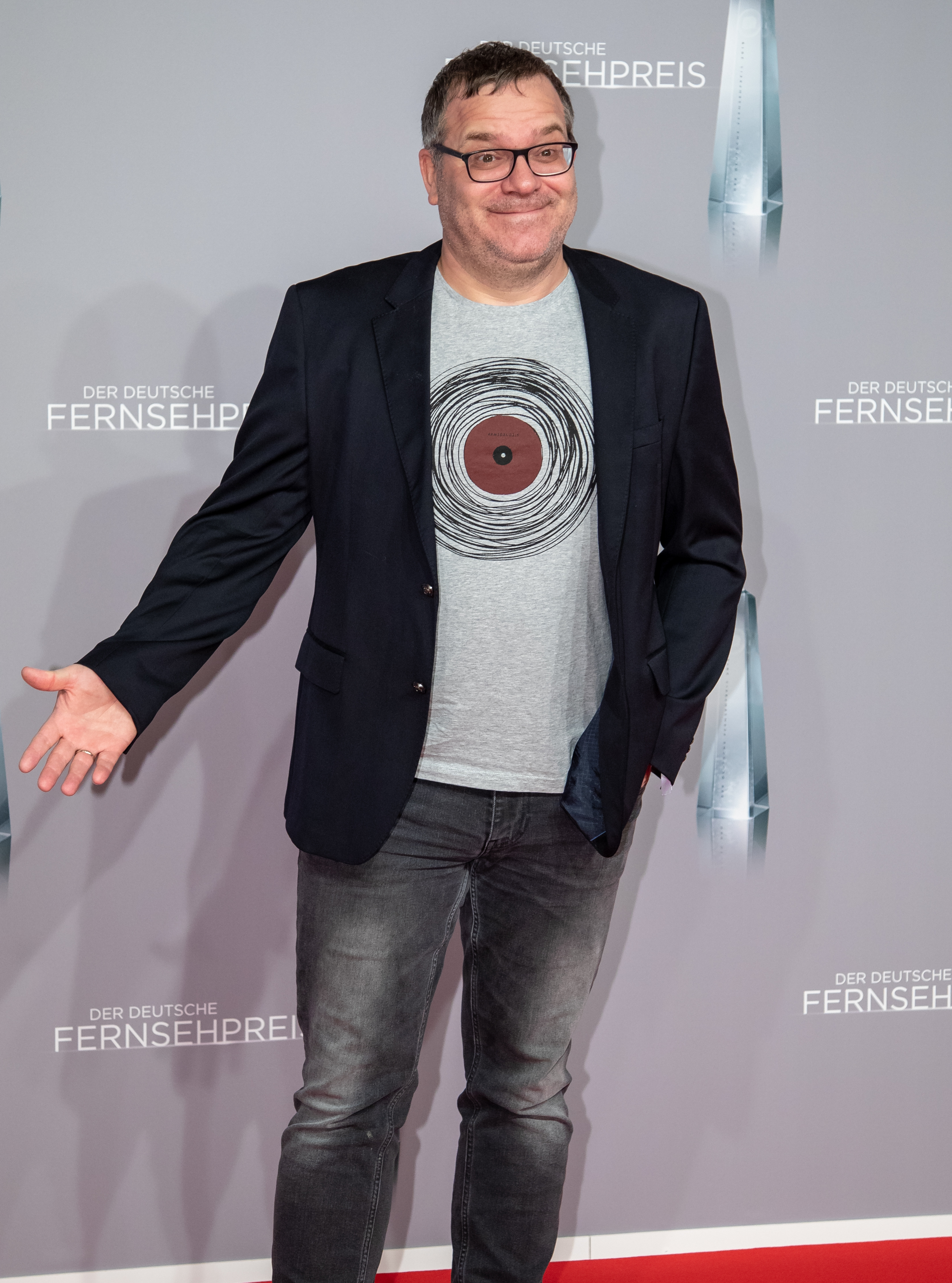
Elton (episode 2)

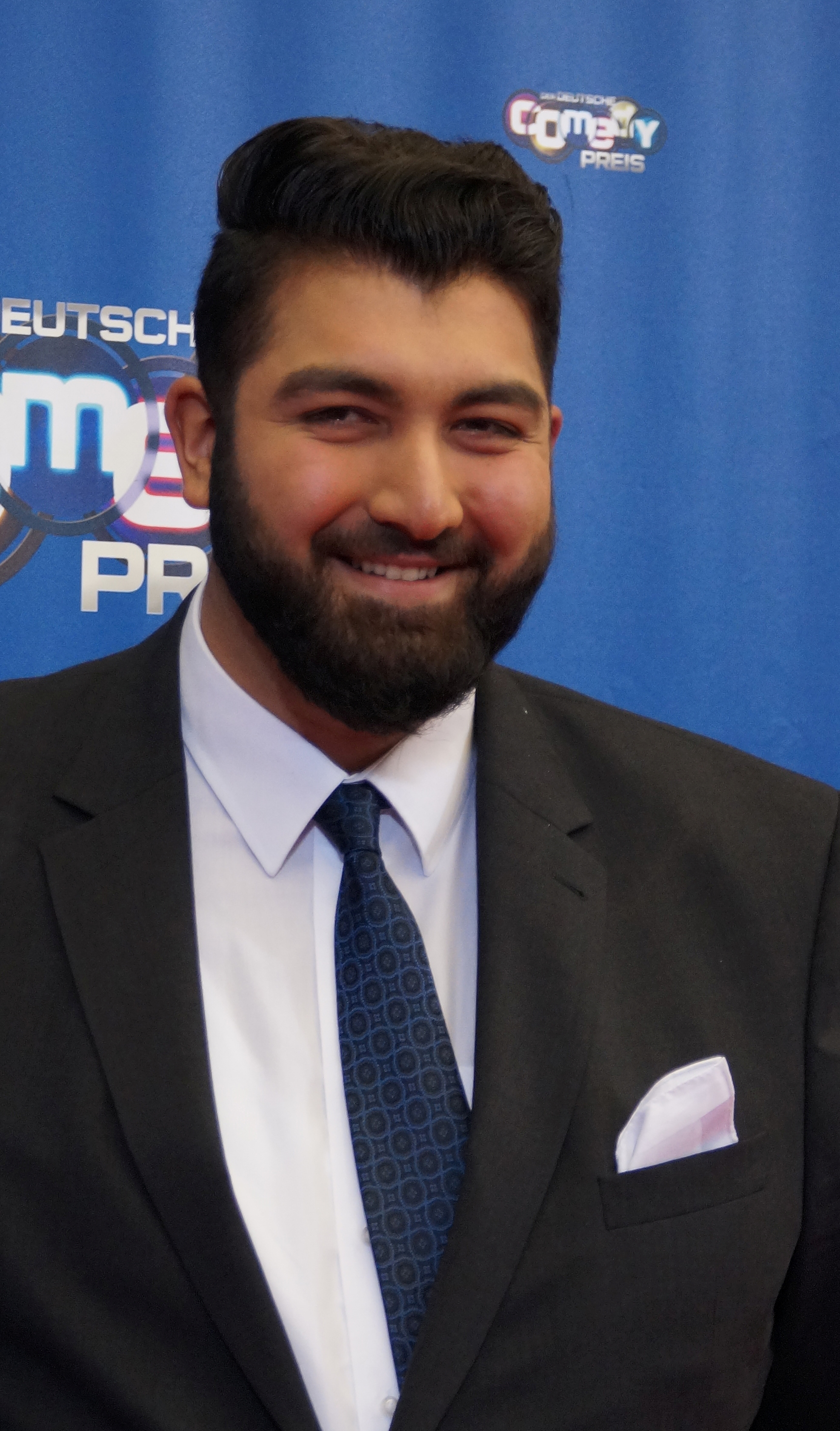
Faisal Kawusi (episode 3)

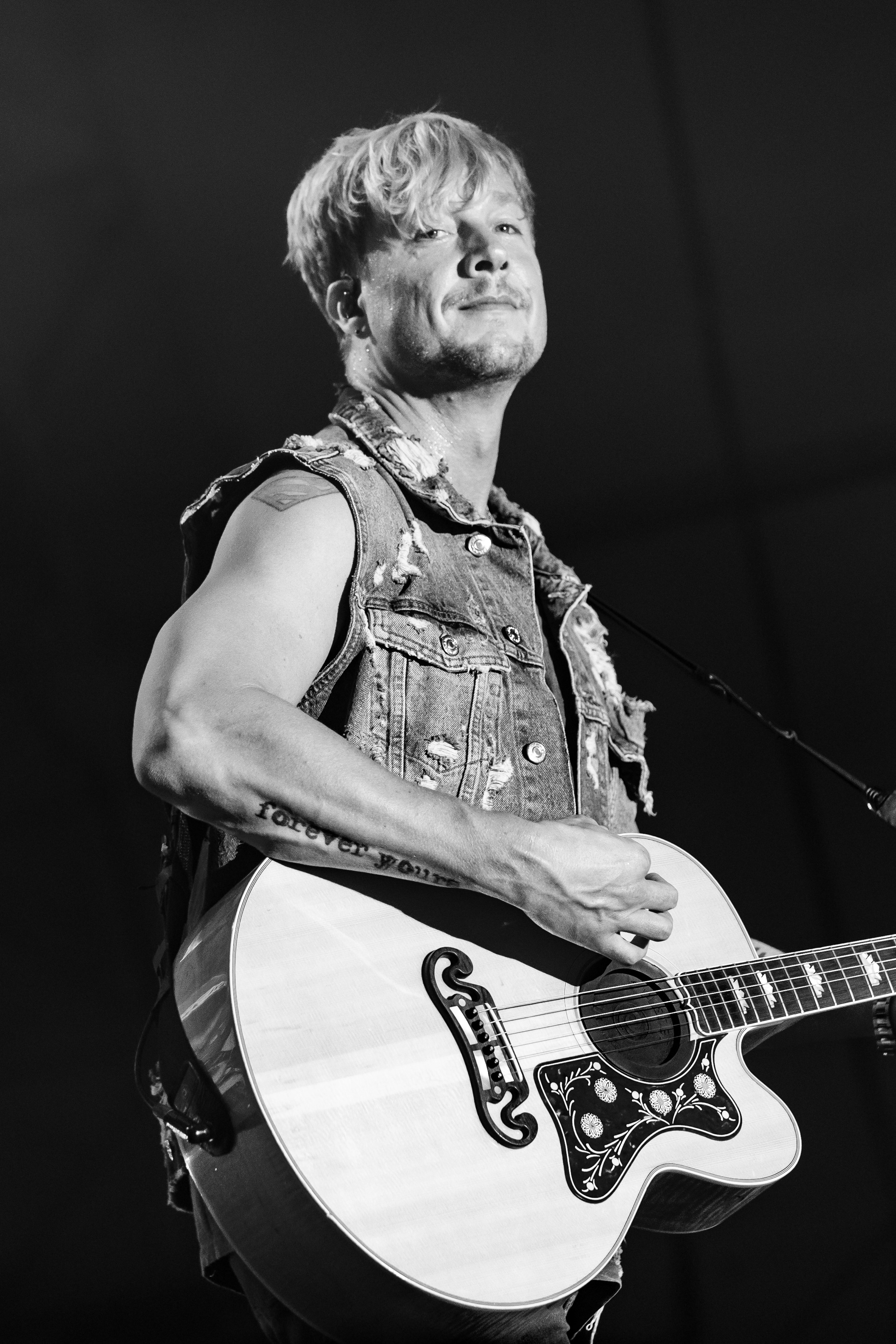
Samu Haber (episode 4)

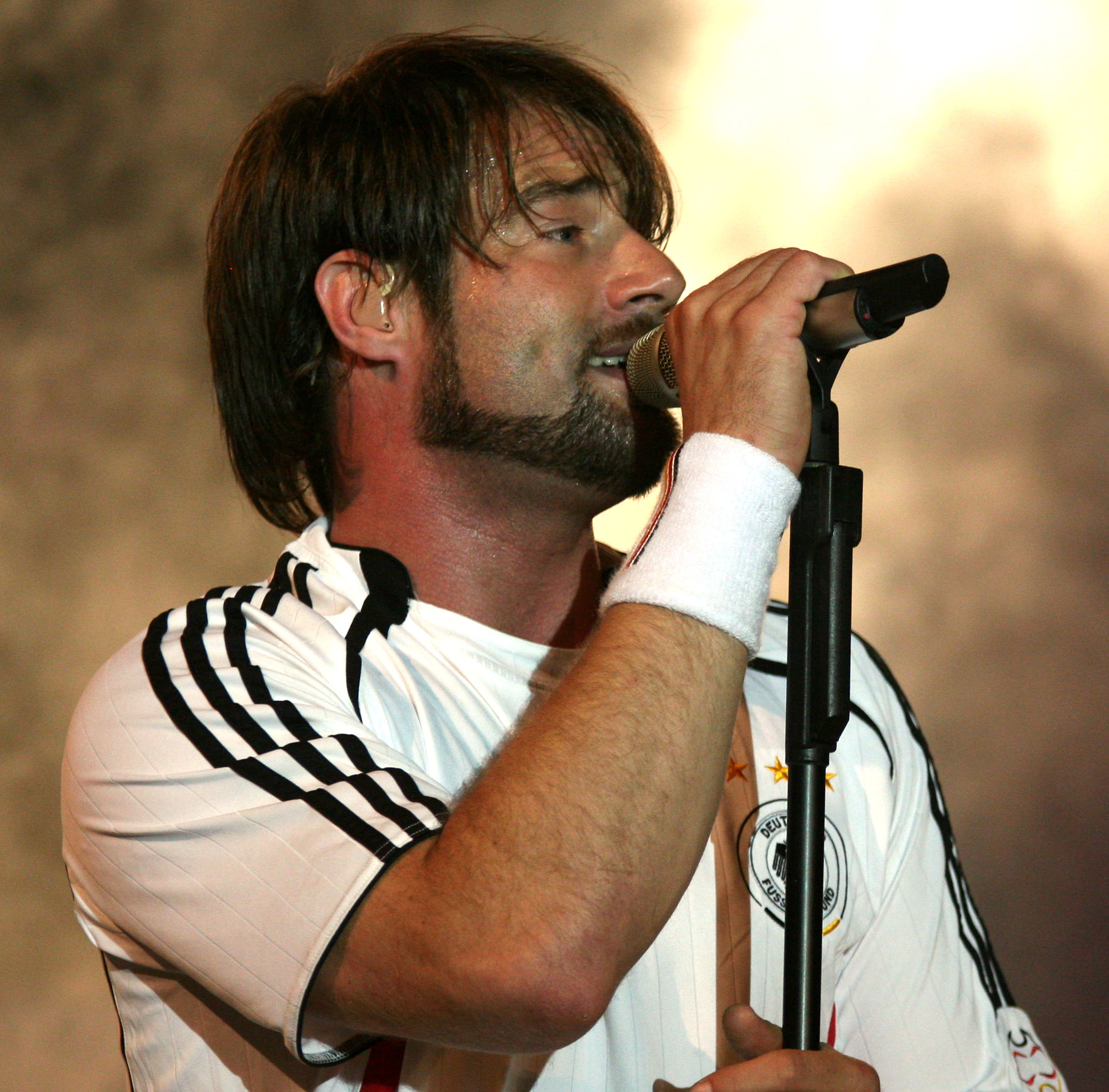
Sasha (episode 5)

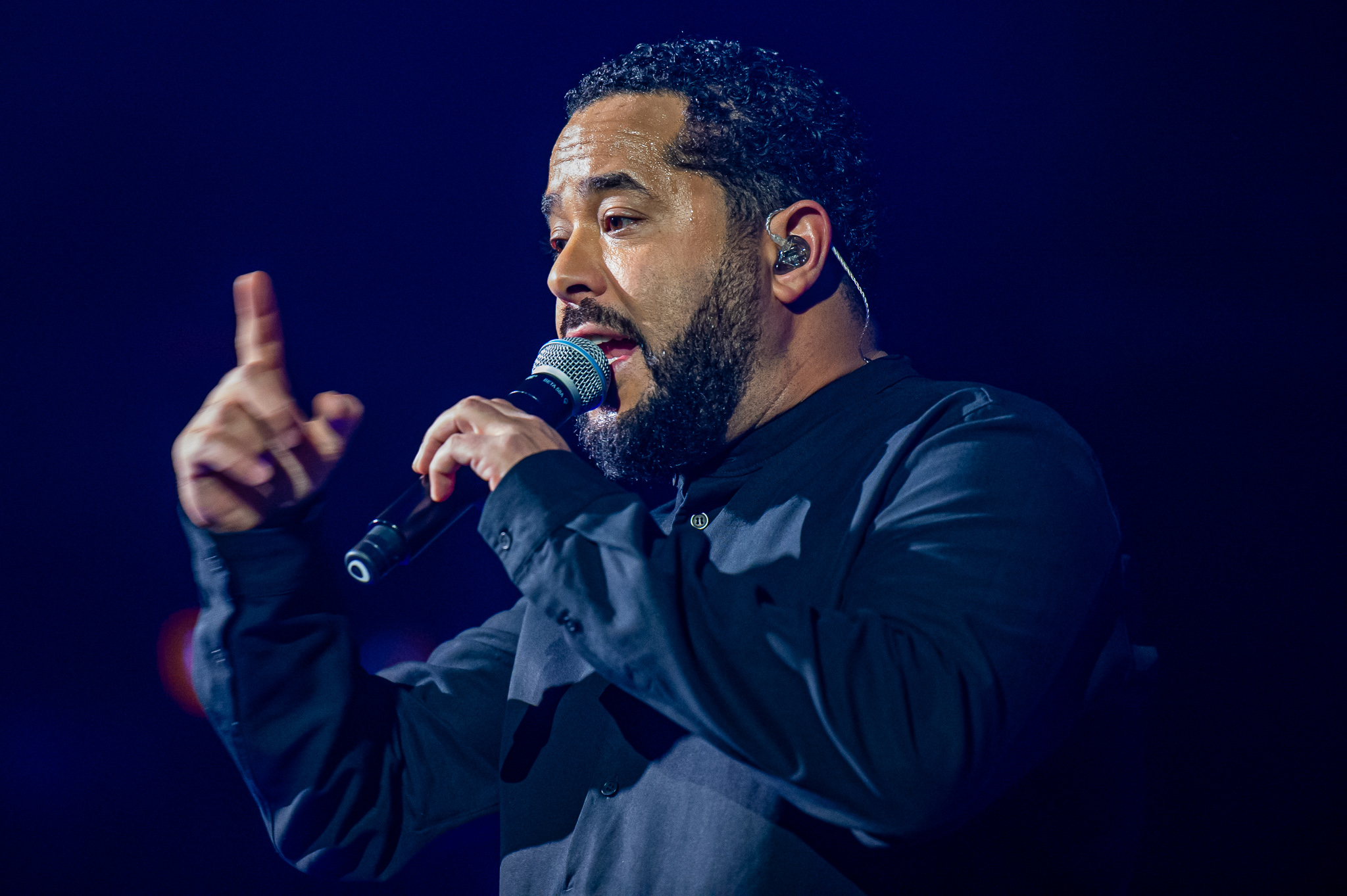
Adel Tawil (episode 6)

| Episode | Name | Notability | Ref. |
|---|---|---|---|
| 1 | Rea Garvey | Singer | |
| 2 | Elton | Presenter | |
| 3 | Faisal Kawusi | Comedian | |
| 4 | Samu Haber | Singer | |
| 5 | Sasha | Singer | |
| 6 | Adel Tawil | Singer | |

== Contestants ==
Among the masked are winners of 41 gold records, 10 × platinum, double platinum, 4-platinum, athletes, German champions, world champions, Golden Camera and Bambi winner and winner of a merit order.

Results
| Stage name | Celebrity | Notability | Live Episodes | | | | | | | |
| Stage name | Celebrity | Notability | 1 | 2 | 3 | 4 | 5 | 6 | | |
| Stage name | Celebrity | Notability | 1 | 2 | 3 | 4 | 5 | A | B | C |
|---|---|---|---|---|---|---|---|---|---|---|
| Astronaut | Max Mutzke | Singer | WIN | WIN | WIN | WIN | WIN | SAFE | WIN | WINNER |
| Grashüpfer "Grasshopper" | Gil Ofarim | Singer | RISK | WIN | WIN | WIN | RISK | SAFE | WIN | RUNNER-UP |
| Engel "Angel" | Bülent Ceylan | Actor/Comedian | WIN | WIN | RISK | RISK | WIN | SAFE | THIRD | |
| Monster | Susi Kentikian | Boxer | RISK | WIN | WIN | WIN | RISK | SAFE | FINALIST | |
| Kudu | Daniel Aminati | Presenter | WIN | WIN | WIN | RISK | WIN | OUT | | |
| Panther | Stefanie Hertel | Singer | WIN | RISK | RISK | WIN | OUT | | | |
| Eichhörnchen "Squirrel" | Marcus Schenkenberg | Model | WIN | RISK | RISK | OUT | | | | |
| Kakadu "Cockatoo" | Heinz Hoenig | Actor | RISK | RISK | OUT | | | | | |
| Schmetterling "Butterfly" | Susan Sideropoulos | Actress | RISK | OUT | | | | | | |
| Oktopus "Octopus" | Lucy Diakovska | Singer | OUT | | | | | | | |

The masked singer won their face-off and remained in the competition.
The masked singer lost their face-off and was in the bottom five/four/three/two, but was not eliminated.
The masked singer was safe from elimination.
The masked singer was eliminated from the competition and unmasked upon their elimination.
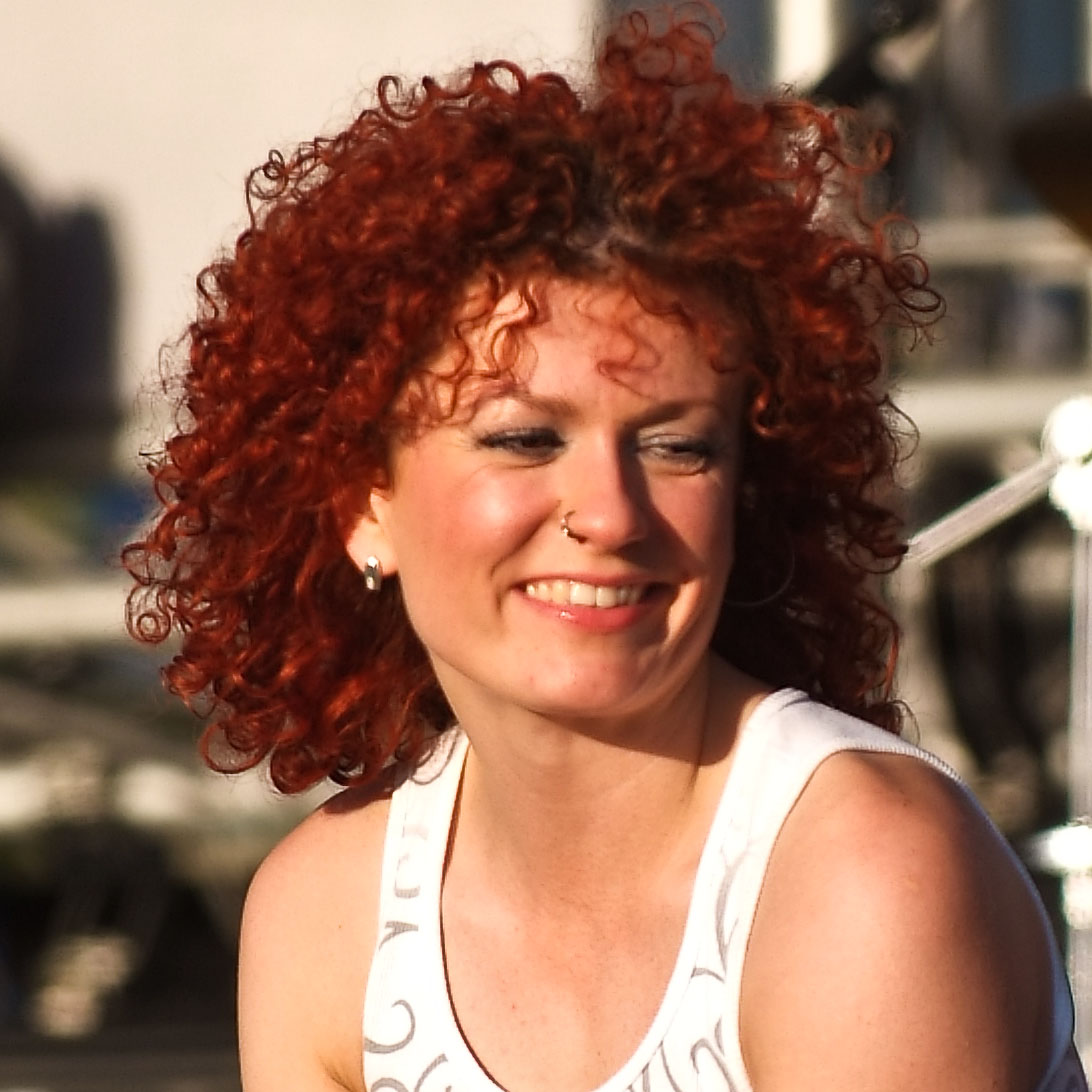
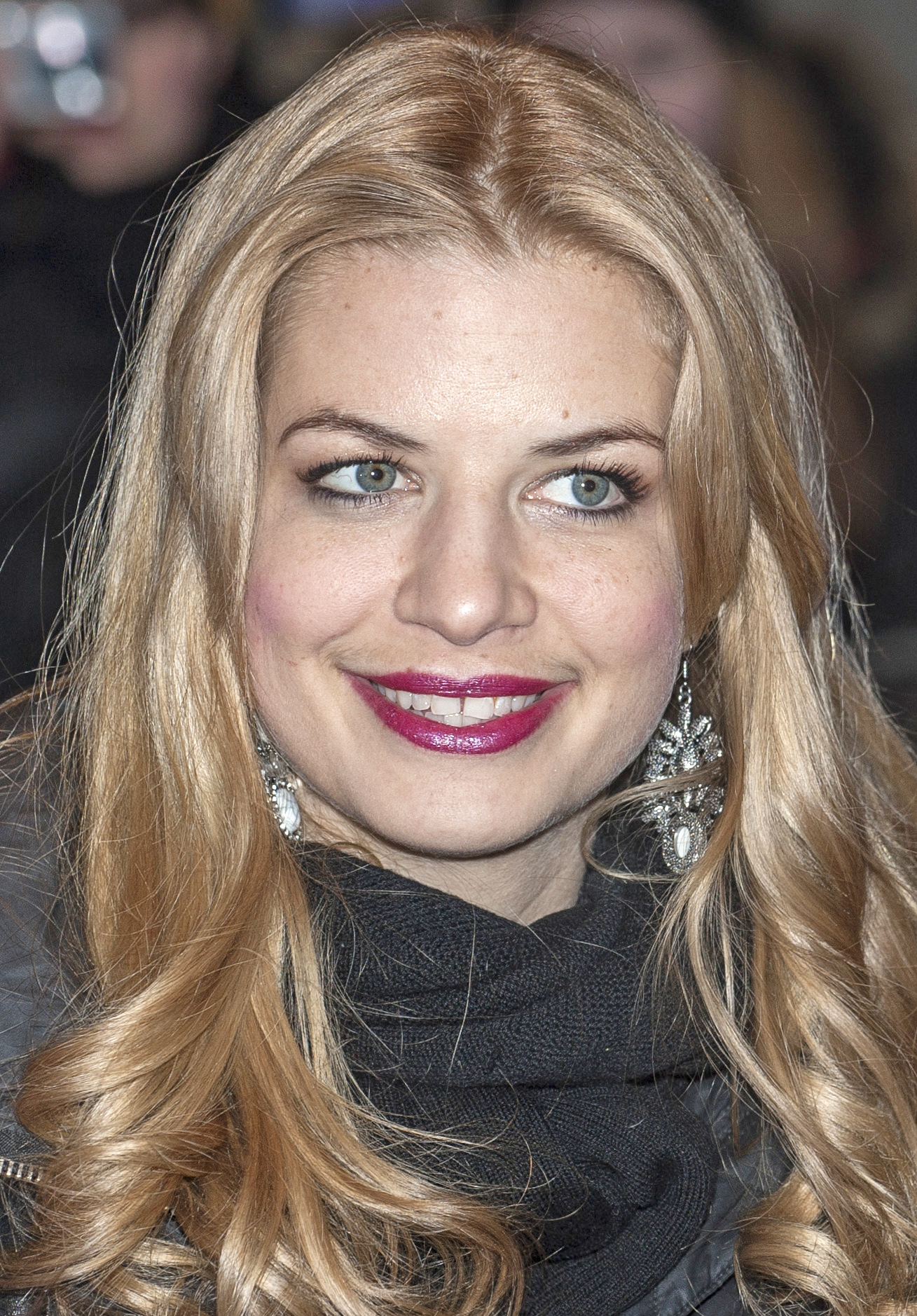
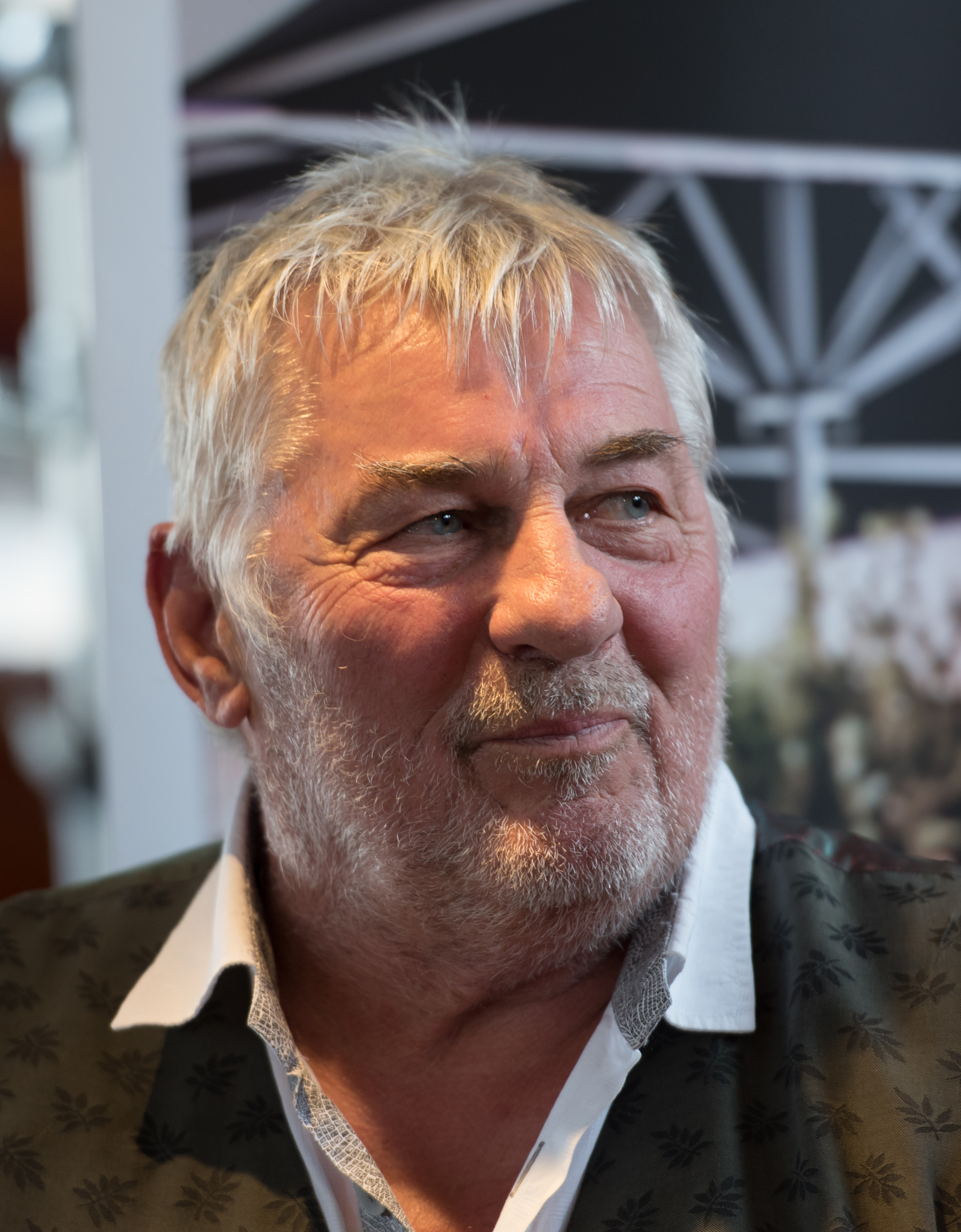
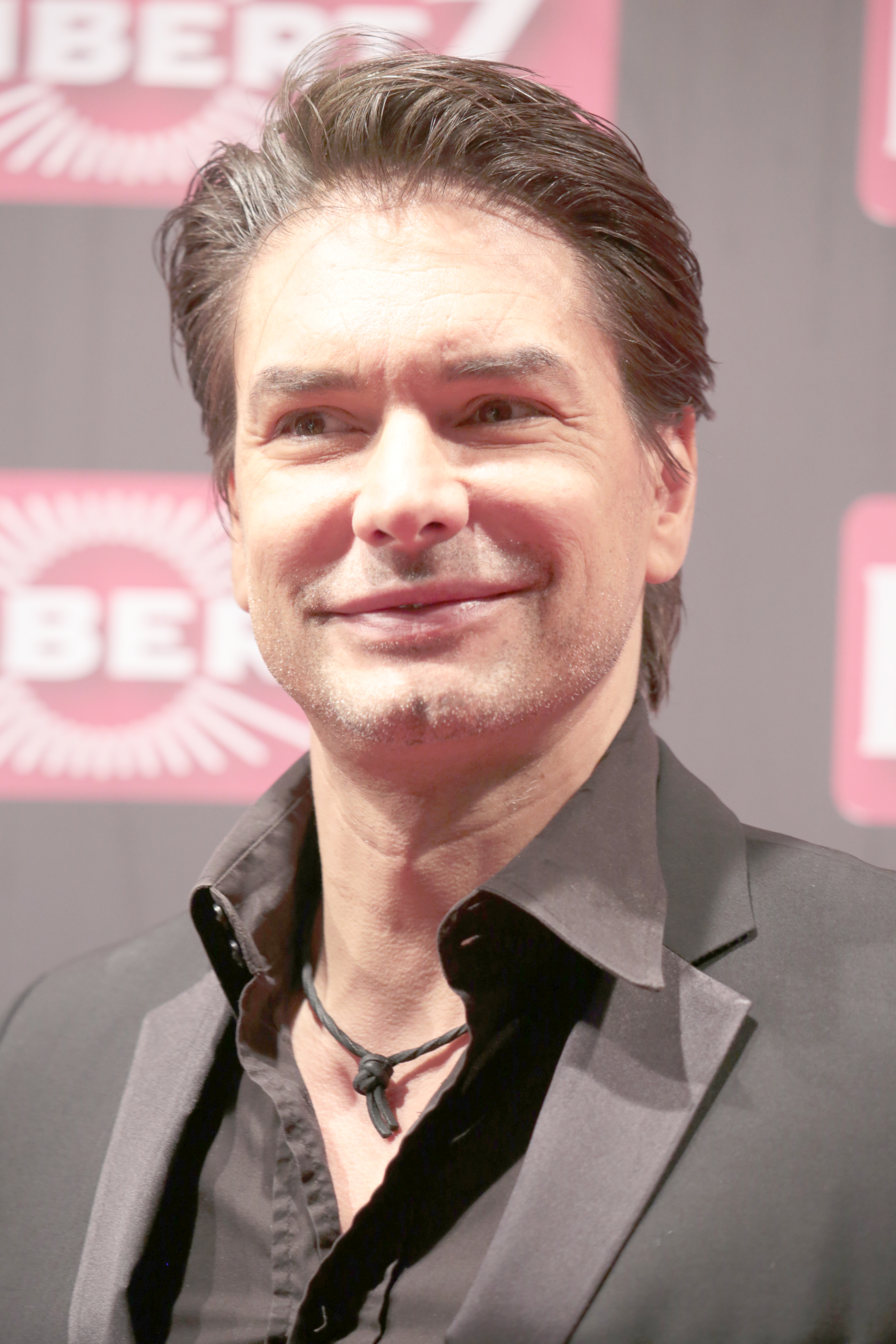
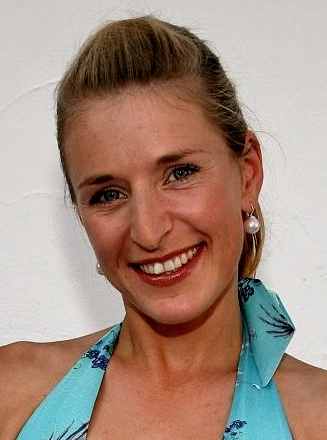
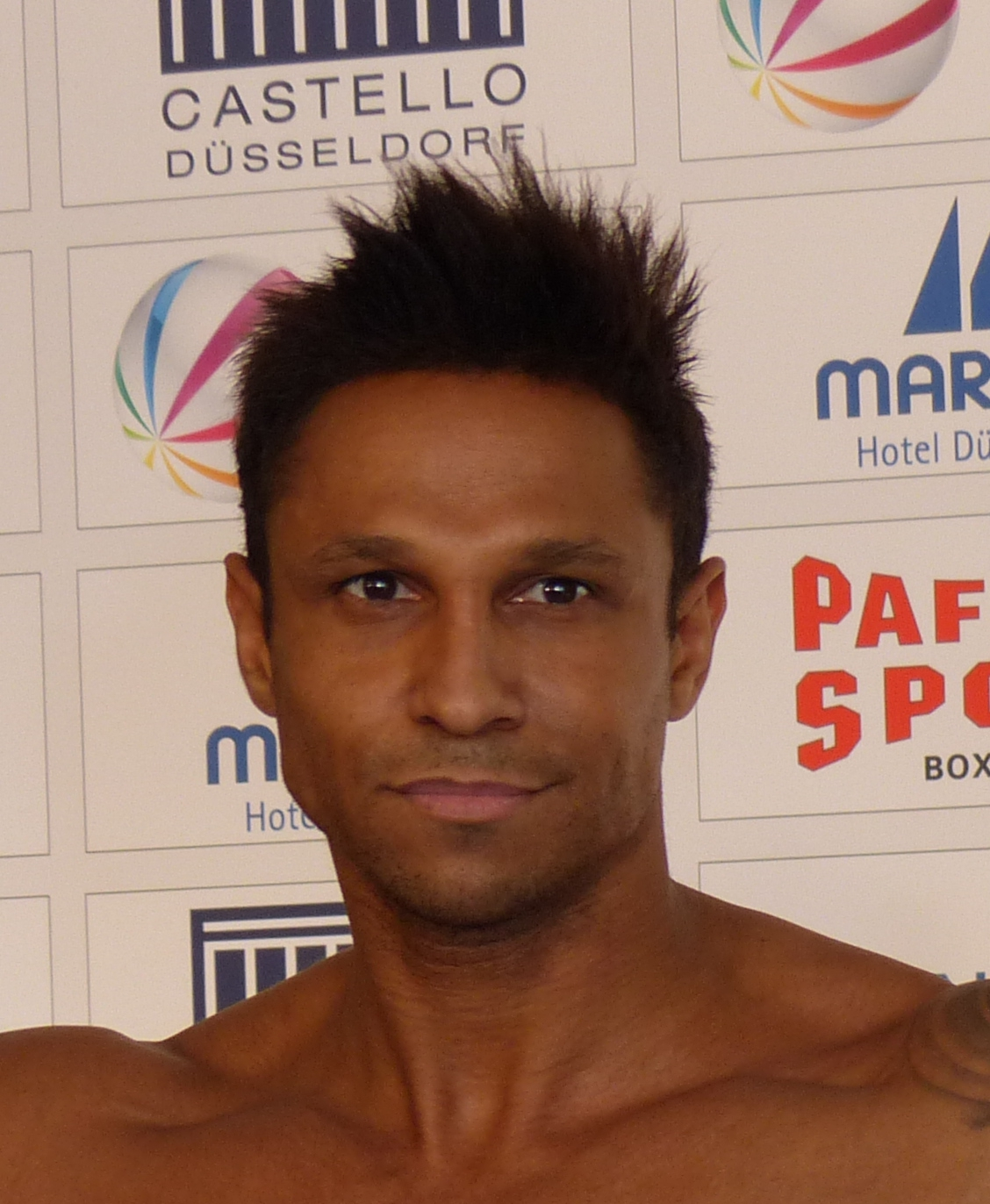
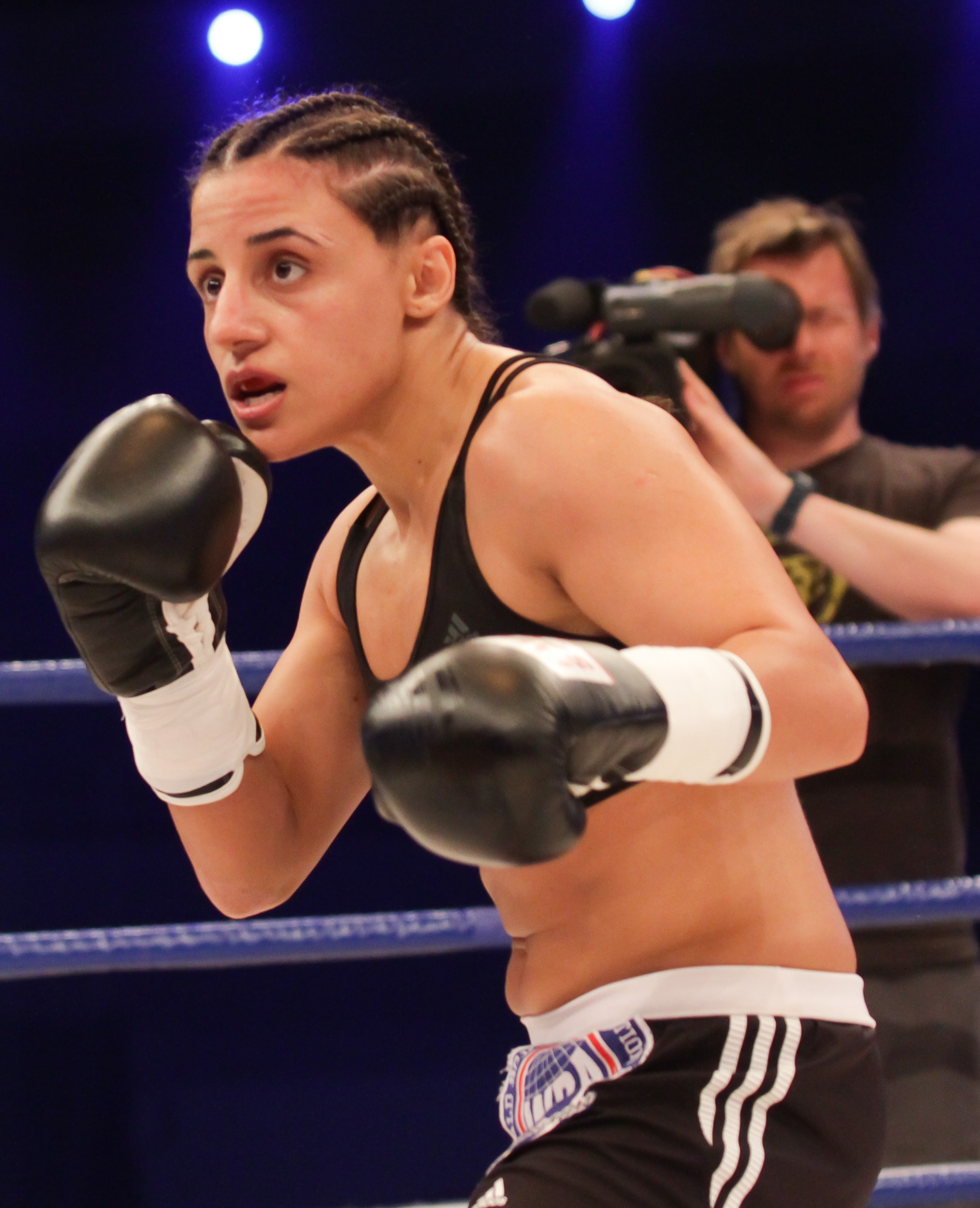
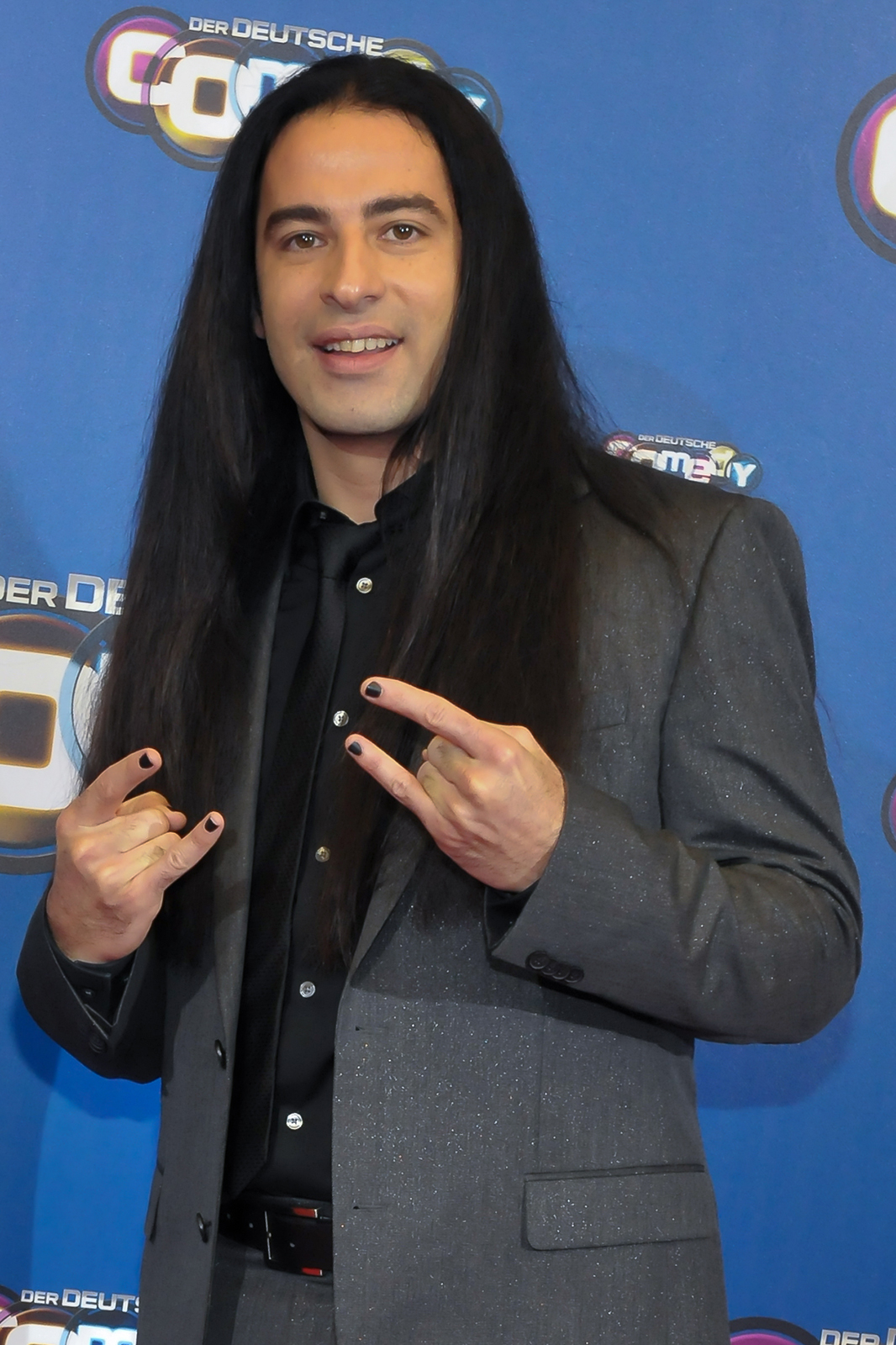
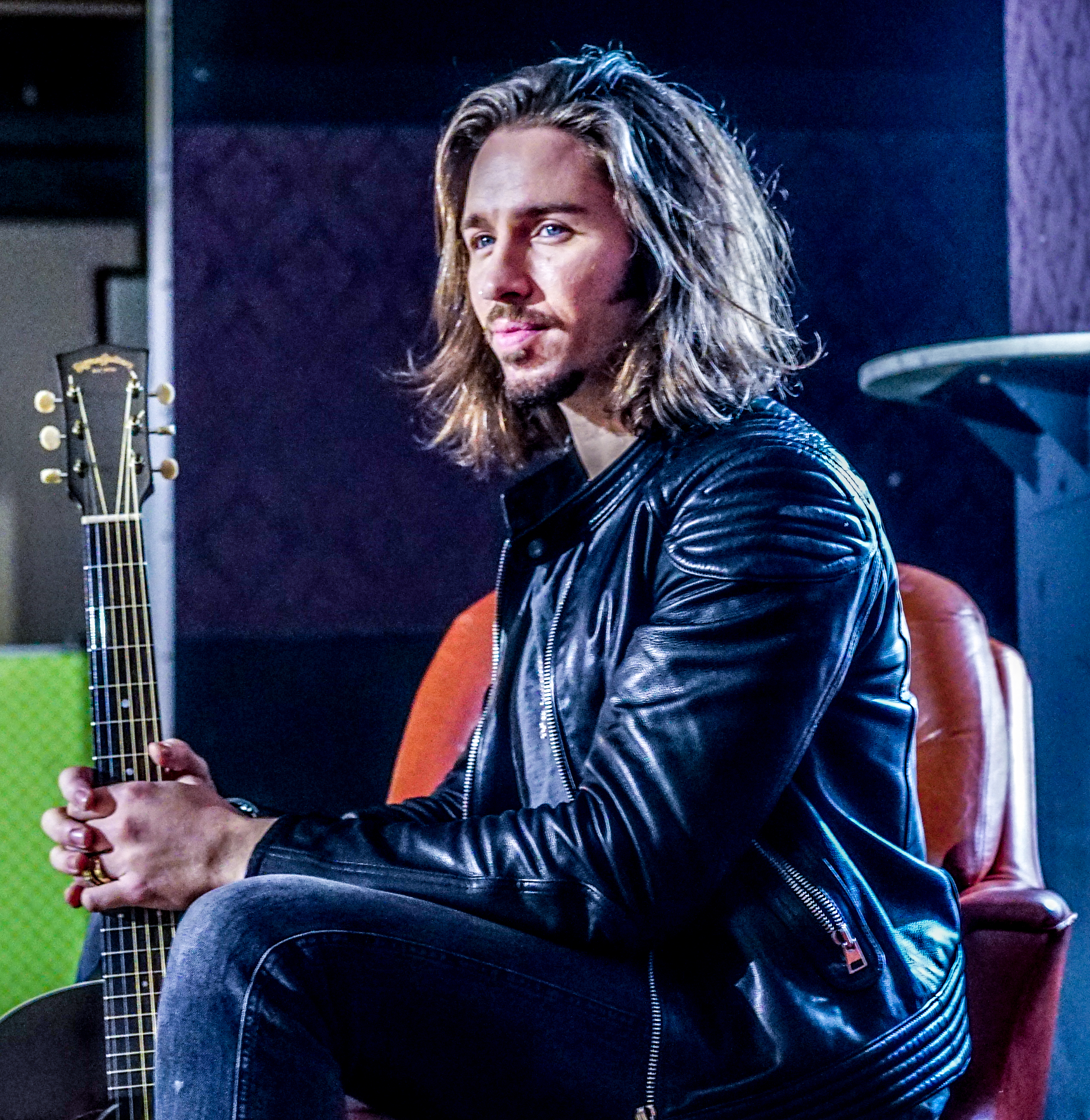
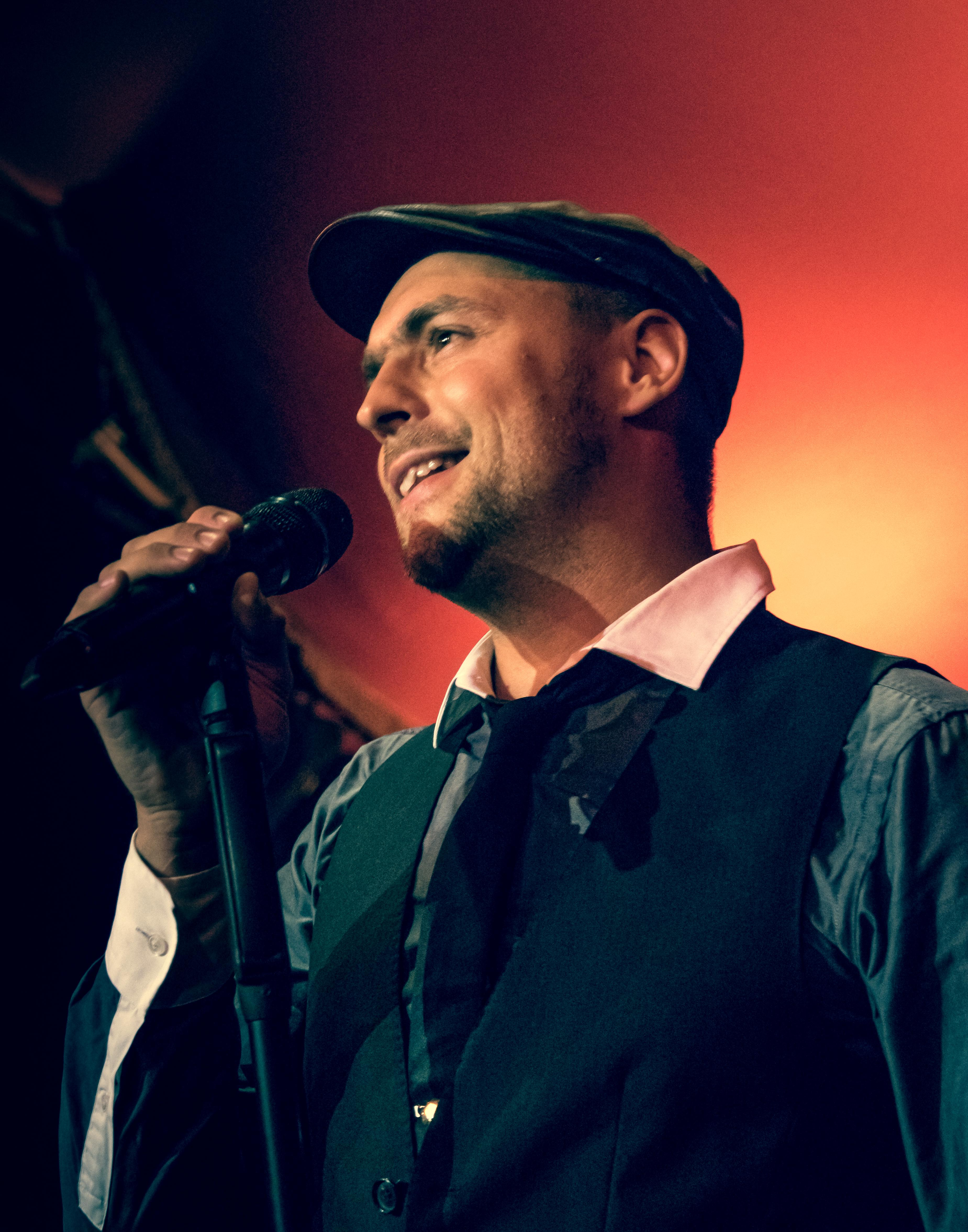
The celebrities who competed in the first season of The Masked Singer, pictured in order of elimination (l-r):
Lucy Diakovska ("Oktopus"), Susan Sideropoulos ("Schmetterling"), Heinz Hoenig ("Kakadu"), Marcus Schenkenberg ("Eichhörnchen"), Stefanie Hertel ("Panther"), Daniel Aminati ("Kudu"), Susi Kentikian ("Monster"), Bülent Ceylan ("Engel"), Gil Ofarim ("Grashüpfer"), Max Mutzke ("Astronaut")

== Episodes ==
=== Week 1 (27 June) ===
Performances on the first live episode
| # | Stage name | Song | Identity | Result |
|---|---|---|---|---|
| 1 | Engel | "Sweet Dreams" by Marilyn Manson | undisclosed | WIN |
| 2 | Monster | "What Is Love" by Haddaway | undisclosed | RISK |
| 3 | Grashüpfer | "Just a Gigolo" by Irving Caesar | undisclosed | RISK |
| 4 | Panther | "Sign of the Times" by Harry Styles | undisclosed | WIN |
| 5 | Oktopus | "Uptown Funk" by Bruno Mars | Lucy Diakovska | OUT |
| 6 | Kudu | "Come with Me" by Puff Daddy | undisclosed | WIN |
| 7 | Kakadu | "You Are So Beautiful" by Joe Cocker | undisclosed | RISK |
| 8 | Eichhörnchen | "Come Together" by The Beatles | undisclosed | WIN |
| 9 | Schmetterling | "Toxic" by Britney Spears | undisclosed | RISK |
| 10 | Astronaut | "Hello" by Adele | undisclosed | WIN |

=== Week 2 (4 July) ===
Performances on the second live episode
| # | Stage name | Song | Identity | Result |
|---|---|---|---|---|
| 1 | Grashüpfer | "Skyfall" by Adele | undisclosed | WIN |
| 2 | Panther | "Sucker" by Jonas Brothers | undisclosed | RISK |
| 3 | Engel | "Nothing Else Matters" by Metallica | undisclosed | WIN |
| 4 | Schmetterling | "Fever" by Peggy Lee | Susan Sideropoulos | OUT |
| 5 | Monster | "Don't Cha" by The Pussycat Dolls | undisclosed | WIN |
| 6 | Kudu | "Use Somebody" by Kings of Leon | undisclosed | WIN |
| 7 | Kakadu | "She's a Lady" by Tom Jones | undisclosed | RISK |
| 8 | Eichhörnchen | "Tainted Love" by Marilyn Manson | undisclosed | RISK |
| 9 | Astronaut | "Someone You Loved" by Lewis Capaldi | undisclosed | WIN |

=== Week 3 (11 July) ===
Performances on the third live episode
| # | Stage name | Song | Identity | Result |
|---|---|---|---|---|
| 1 | Engel | "Atemlos durch die Nacht" by Helene Fischer | undisclosed | RISK |
| 2 | Grashüpfer | "Believer" by Imagine Dragons | undisclosed | WIN |
| 3 | Panther | "Don't You Worry 'bout a Thing" by Stevie Wonder | undisclosed | RISK |
| 4 | Kudu | "Are You Gonna Go My Way" by Lenny Kravitz | undisclosed | WIN |
| 5 | Kakadu | "Behind Blue Eyes" by Limp Bizkit | Heinz Hoenig | OUT |
| 6 | Monster | "Superstar" by Christine Milton | undisclosed | WIN |
| 7 | Eichhörnchen | "Mmm Mmm Mmm Mmm" by Crash Test Dummies | undisclosed | RISK |
| 8 | Astronaut | "Tears in Heaven" by Eric Clapton | undisclosed | WIN |

=== Week 4 (18 July) ===
Performances on the fourth live episode
| # | Stage name | Song | Result | |
|---|---|---|---|---|
| 1 | Kudu | "Let Me Entertain You" by Robbie Williams | RISK | |
| 2 | Grashüpfer | "Shallow" by Lady Gaga & Bradley Cooper | WIN | |
| 3 | Panther | "Highway to Hell" by AC/DC | WIN | |
| 4 | Monster | "7 Rings" by Ariana Grande | WIN | |
| 5 | Eichhörnchen | "The House of the Rising Sun" by The Animals | RISK | |
| 6 | Engel | "Killing in the Name" by Rage Against the Machine | RISK | |
| 7 | Astronaut | "Space Oddity" by David Bowie | WIN | |
| Sing-off details | | | Identity | Result |
| 1 | Kudu | "Feeling Good" by Michael Bublé | undisclosed | SAFE |
| 2 | Eichhörnchen | "Song 2" by Blur | Marcus Schenkenberg | OUT |
| 3 | Engel | "Word Up!" by Korn | undisclosed | SAFE |

=== Week 5 (25 July) – Semi-final ===
Performances on the fifth live episode
| # | Stage name | Song | Result | |
|---|---|---|---|---|
| 1 | Monster | "Crazy" by Britney Spears | RISK | |
| 2 | Kudu | "Lose Yourself" by Eminem / "Jump Around" by House of Pain | WIN | |
| 3 | Panther | "Memory" by Andrew Lloyd Webber | RISK | |
| 4 | Engel | "Engel" by Rammstein | WIN | |
| 5 | Astronaut | "Stay with Me" by Sam Smith | WIN | |
| 6 | Grashüpfer | "Creep" by Radiohead | RISK | |
| Sing-off details | | | Identity | Result |
| 1 | Monster | "Can't Get You Out of My Head" by Kylie Minogue | undisclosed | SAFE |
| 2 | Panther | "Girl on Fire" by Alicia Keys | Stefanie Hertel | OUT |
| 3 | Grashüpfer | "The Pretender" by Foo Fighters | undisclosed | SAFE |

=== Week 6 (1 August) – Final ===
- Group number: "Bohemian Rhapsody" by Queen

==== Round One ====
Performances on the final live episode – round one
| # | Stage name | Song | Identity | Result |
|---|---|---|---|---|
| 1 | Kudu | "Put Your Hands Up" by Fatman Scoop / "Hip Hop Hooray" By Naughty by Nature | Daniel Aminati | OUT |
| 2 | Grashüpfer | "Sorry Seems to Be the Hardest Word" by Elton John | undisclosed | SAFE |
| 3 | Monster | "Crazy in Love" by Beyoncé feat. Jay-Z | undisclosed | SAFE |
| 4 | Engel | "Chop Suey!" by System of a Down | undisclosed | SAFE |
| 5 | Astronaut | "What a Wonderful World" by Louis Armstrong / "Fields of Gold" by Sting | undisclosed | SAFE |

==== Round Two ====
Performances on the final live episode – round two
| # | Stage name | Song | Identity | Result |
|---|---|---|---|---|
| 1 | Grashüpfer | "Kings and Queens" by 30 Seconds to Mars | undisclosed | WIN |
| 2 | Monster | "Friends" by Marshmello & Anne-Marie | Susi Kentikian | OUT |
| 3 | Engel | "Wannabe" by Spice Girls | Bülent Ceylan | OUT |
| 4 | Astronaut | "Earth Song" by Michael Jackson | undisclosed | WIN |

==== Round Three ====
Performances on the final live episode – round three
| # | Stage name | Song | Identity | Result |
|---|---|---|---|---|
| 1 | Grashüpfer | "Shallow" by Lady Gaga & Bradley Cooper | Gil Ofarim | RUNNER-UP |
| 2 | Astronaut | "Tears in Heaven" by Eric Clapton | Max Mutzke | WINNER |

== Reception ==
=== Ratings ===
| Episode | Original airdate | Time slot | Viewers (in millions) | | Share (in %) | | Source |
| Episode | Original airdate | Time slot | Household | Adults 14-49 | Household | Adults 14-49 | Source |
|---|---|---|---|---|---|---|---|
| 1 | 27 June 2019 | Thursdays 8:15 pm | 2.19 | 1.46 | 9.4 | 20.7 | |
| 2 | 4 July 2019 | Thursdays 8:15 pm | 2.55 | 1.65 | 11.1 | 24.6 | |
| 3 | 11 July 2019 | Thursdays 8:15 pm | 3.03 | 2.04 | 12.1 | 27.3 | |
| 4 | 18 July 2019 | Thursdays 8:15 pm | 3.12 | 2.02 | 12.9 | 27.2 | |
| 5 | 25 July 2019 | Thursdays 8:15 pm | 3.16 | 2.07 | 14.0 | 29.0 | |
| 6 | 1 August 2019 | Thursdays 8:15 pm | 4.34 | 2.67 | 20.0 | 38.5 | |
| Average | | | 3.15 | 2.03 | 13.6 | 28.3 | |
