= Len Boone =

American Singer

Len Boone (a.k.a. Leonard Boone C Coleman II) is an American singer, songwriter and multi-instrumentalist. He was a singer/songwriter for Chrysalis Records and Love-Zager Productions and many of his songs charted on Billboard. While still an intern at Chrysalis, he wrote the international hit single "You Made Me Believe in Magic" (Arista Records) for the album It’s a Game by the Scottish Pop band, the Bay City Rollers. In 1977, the song reached number 10 on the US Hot 100 in Billboard magazine and number 7 on the Cash Box Top 100 charts. In Canada, “You Made Me Believe in Magic” peaked at number 5, and still ranks as their 68th greatest hit of 1977. The song also charted in Germany, the UK, Australia, and New Zealand. "You Made Me Believe in Magic" also won Boone a plaque from ASCAP (American Society of Composers, Authors, and Publishers).

== Early years ==
Boone grew up in Fieldsboro, New Jersey and attended Bordentown Regional High School. He was a standout athlete for both his track and football teams and received several mentions in the local newspapers. While in high school, Boone started taking drum lessons and joined a musical group called Inturnal Revenue. He continued to perform and compose music with this band through his sophomore year in college. Inturnal Revenue found local success and recorded an original song called, “Love Theme For” which received air time from Len Murray, a disc jockey at WTTM radio in New Jersey. Later in college, he headed the band, Piecemeal, a four-piece musical group for which he composed and played piano and drums.

Boone attended Rutgers University and majored in political science and history. He played cornerback and defensive halfback for the Rutgers football team, the Scarlet Knights and local newspapers regularly reported his success. . In 1972 he won The George T. Cronin Trophy for most improved player. As a student he was passionate about the needs of inner city kids and pushed for Rutgers to participate in the Urban Classic Benefit game to raise money for underprivileged youth.

After college, Boone worked as a substitute teacher at Franklin High School in New Jersey and had offers to teach history. He played rugby with an alumni squad from Rutgers called "The Old Boys" and coached the newly-established Rutgers women's rugby team. However, his goal was to work in the music business.

== Music career ==
In 1975, his musical talents caught the attention of Wes Ferrell and he was hired as an intern songwriter for the Wes Ferrell organization. One year later, he signed a contract with Chrysalis Music Inc. headed by Marv Goodman. Boone was an intern when he wrote the international hit, “You Made Me Believe in Magic” (Arista Records AS0256) recorded by the Bay City Rollers. During this same period, he also wrote Maxine Nightingale’s song “You Got To Me” (United Artists 36460)

In 1977, Boone's success turned into an exclusive recording contract with Chrysalis Records. The same year, he wrote “You’re the One” for Rory Block which peaked at No. 77 on the US Billboard dance chart. (Chrysalis 2356)

In 1978 Boone's song “Love Won’t Be Denied” (Chrysalis CDS-2229) spent 10 weeks on the Billboard Dance Club Song chart and peaked at number 20 on September 9, 1978.

In 1980, after four years with Chrysalis, Boone joined Love-Zager Productions as a staff writer. He teamed with songwriter Larry LaFalce for several songs. In 1980 they wrote “Baby, This Time” for Dee Edwards for her album Two Hearts Are Better Than One (Cotillion SD5223) and in 1981 they wrote Amii Stewart’s song, “Why’d Ya Have To Be So Sexy” (Handshake Records and Tapes 4W9-02438)

In 1982, Boone, LaFalce, and Michael Zager wrote “Lay Back in the Groove” for the album Show and Tell by the band Elusion Featuring Limon Wilson (Cotillion 5235). The same year, Boone and LaFalce wrote the song “Everything and More” for the Italian/U.S. ensemble Change. The song was included on the album Sharing Your Love, which reached No. 66 on the US Billboard Album Chart and No. 14 on the U.S. Billboard Black Albums chart.

In 1983, Boone and LaFalce wrote the songs “This is Your Time” (RFC/Atlantic 89883) and “Magical Night” (Atlantic/RFC Records DMD 631) for the album This is Your Time by Change. The album made it to No. 161 on the US Billboard Albums chart and No. 34 on the US Billboard Black Albums chart. Their song “This is Your Time” reached No. 39 on the US dance charts and number No. 33 on the US R&B chart.

In 1995, "You Made Me Believe in Magic" was covered by Bed & Breakfast, a boy band from Hamburg, Germany (Maad Records 4509-99533-2).

In 2013, Boone released the EP Do Whatcha Feel (Fervor Records).

Boone owns Rock Your Socks Music, based in Philadelphia, Pennsylvania.

== TV and movie placements ==
In 1979, Boone's song "There’s No Me Without You" was featured in the Thorn EMI film The Bitch starring Joan Collins.

Boone's song "You Made Me Believe in Magic" was played on season 2, episode 7 of October Road (ABC Studios).) His song “Do Whatcha Feel” is played in season 1, episode 6 of The Mayor (ABC); season 5, episode 20 of Haven (Syfy, Showcase); season 1, episode 5 of Red Oaks (Amazon Studios); season 1, episode 6 of Bojack Horseman (Netflix), and the independent film Love After Love (2017). His song “Another Lonely Night” is played in the independent films My Friend Dahmer (2017) and Humor Me (2017). His song, “I’ve Got to Have You” performed by Julian, is played in season 1, episode 4 of Insatiable (Netflix).
