= Don't Let the Music Die =

Single by Bay City Rollers

from the album It's a Game
- B-side: "The Way I Feel Tonight"
- Released: 1977
- Recorded: 1977
- Genre: Rock, pop
- Length: 5:47
- Label: Toshiba/EMI
- Songwriter(s): Eric Faulkner, Stuart Wood
- Producer(s): Harry Maslin

Bay City Rollers singles chronology
| "The Way I Feel Tonight" (1977) | "Don't Let the Music Die" (1977) | "Where Will I Be Now" (1978) |

"Don't Let the Music Die" is a pop ballad by the Bay City Rollers from their 1977 album It's a Game. The tune, written by Eric Faulkner and Stuart Wood, and featuring a lead vocal by Les McKeown, is a slow, dramatic ballad with a heavily orchestrated arrangement and melancholy feel. It was released as a 7" double A-side vinyl single (with "The Way I Feel Tonight") in Japan, where it became a chart hit.

== Track listing ==
1. "Don't Let the Music Die" - 5:47
2. "The Way I Feel Tonight" - 3:56

== Credits ==
- Producer - Harry Maslin
- Written By - Eric Faulkner, Stuart "Woody" Wood
