= Lou (German singer) =

German singer

Louise Hoffner (born 27 October 1963), known professionally as Lou, is a German pop singer. She toured with her band for 15 years, in Germany as well as abroad.

== Eurovision ==
Lou participated in the 2001 Eurovision national finals, coming in third place. Shortly before Christmas 2002, composer Ralph Siegel asked her if she would be interested in competing in the national finals again with "Let's Get Happy", a song he had written with lyricist Bernd Meinunger.

Lou won the German 2003 finals on 7 March, which qualified her to represent Germany at the Eurovision Song Contest 2003 in Riga where she came in 11th place. In March 2006, she made a guest appearance at that year's German Eurovision preselection, singing "Let's Get Happy" in a medley of past German Eurovision entries.

== Personal life ==
Lou was born in Waghäusel, the sixth child of her parents.

== Discography ==
=== Albums ===
- 1999 PartyGang Live (Promo Album)
- 2003 For You (Jupiter Records/Sony BMG)
- 2004 Ich will leben (Goodlife Records/ZYX)
- 2011 Blaue Nacht
- 2013 Gefühl On The Rocks

=== EPs ===
- 2013 EP: Special Edition Berlin 2013

=== Singles ===
- 2001 Happy Birthday Party, Sha La La La Lee
- 2003 Let's get happy, Sunshine Dancing / The show must go on, Lou Tango
- 2004 Dankeschoen, Ich werd dich lieben (Ich werd dich hassen), Ich will leben
- 2009 Im Labyrinth der Liebe, Dein Bild in meinem Portmonnaie, Heut Nacht oder nie
- 2013 Im Labyrinth der Liebe, Heut Nacht oder nie

Preceded by Corinna May with I Can't Live Without Music	Germany in the Eurovision Song Contest; 2003	Succeeded by Max with Can't Wait Until Tonight
