= Durch Einander =

Studio album by Max Mutzke
- Released: 14 September 2012
- Genre: Pop; soul; jazz
- Label: Columbia; Sony
- Producer: Wolfgang Haffner

Max Mutzke chronology
Home Work Soul (2010)	Durch Einander (2012)	Max (2015)

Durch Einander is the fifth studio album by German recording artist Max Mutzke. It was released by Columbia Records and Sony Music on 14 September 2012 in German-speaking Europe.

== Track listing ==
No.	Title	Writer(s)	Original artist(s)	Length
1.	"Telefon"	Annette Humpe; Frank-Jürgen Krüger	Ideal	3:46
2.	"Vielleicht" (featuring Menzel Muztke)	Sebastian Madsen	Madsen	3:40
3.	"Weil ich Dich liebe" (featuring Bruno Müller)	Mutzke; Stefan Raab		3:41
4.	"Creep"	Colin Greenwood; Michael Hazlewood; Albert Hammond; Jonathan Greenwood; Ed O'Brien; Philip Selway; Thom Yorke	Radiohead	4:15
5.	"Empire State of Mind"	Shawn Carter; Alicia Keys; Sylvia Robinson; Angela Hunt; Bert Keyes; Janet Sewell; Alexander Shuckburgh	Jay-Z featuring Alicia Keys	4:11
6.	"Ohne Dich" (featuring Christian Neander)	Neander; Jan Plewka; Leo Schmidthals; Stephan Eggert; Jan Neumann	Selig	4:54
7.	"Sommerregen" (featuring Wigald Boning)	Andreas Rieke; Michael B. Schmidt; Thomas Dürr; Michael DJ Beck; Oliver Rüger	Die Fantastischen Vier	4:34
8.	"Singing My Song for You" (featuring Klaus Doldinger)	Leon Russell	Leon Russell	4:34
9.	"Me and Mrs. Jones" (featuring Cassandra Steen)	Leon Huff; Cary Gilbert; Kenneth Gamble	Billy Paul	4:23
10.	"Du und ich" (featuring Götz Alsmann & Stephan Schulze)	Suzie Kerstgens; Thomas Deininger; Sten Servaes	Klee	3:29
11.	"Marie" (2012 Version)	Oli Rüger; Tenzing Melanchton; Baret Davidian		4:23
12.	"You Are So Beautiful"	Billy Preston; Bruce Fisher	Joe Cocker	4:11
13.	"What's Going On" (featuring Nils Landgren)	Marvin Gaye; Renaldo Benson; Al Cleveland	Marvin Gaye	4:54
14.	"Du bist zu sexy" (featuring Thomas D, DJ Ease & Nightmares on Wax)	Mutzke; Justin Balk; Dürr		3:23
15.	"Michelle"	John Lennon; Paul McCartney	The Beatles	3:48
16.	"Song für Dich" (featuring Menzel Mutzke)	Mutzke; Raab		3:48
17.	"Durcheinander" (featuring Sebastian Studnitzky)	Mutzke; Michael Kurth; Wolfgang Haffner; Studnitzky		6:01

iTunes bonus tracks
No.	Title	Writer(s)	Original artist(s)	Length
18.	"Nur Du"	Mutzke; Raab		3:40
19.	"Every Breath You Take"	Sting	The Police	3:50

== Charts ==
Chart (2012)	Peak position
Austrian Albums (Ö3 Austria)	54
German Albums (Offizielle Top 100)	28

== Release history ==
Region	Date	Format	Label
Austria	14 September 2012	Digital download; CD	Columbia, Sony
Germany	14 September 2012	Digital download; CD	Columbia, Sony
Switzerland	14 September 2012	Digital download; CD	Columbia, Sony
