= Max (Max Mutzke album) =

Studio album by Max Mutzke
- Released: 12 June 2015
- Genre: Pop; soul
- Length: 101:00
- Label: Columbia; Sony

Max Mutzke chronology
| Durch Einander (2012) | Max (2015) | Colors (2018) |

Max is the sixth studio album by German recording artist Max Mutzke. It was released by Columbia Records and Sony Music on 12 June 2015 in German-speaking Europe.

== Track listing ==
| No. | Title | Writer(s) | Length |
|---|---|---|---|
| 1. | "Praise the Day" | Max Mutzke; Andreas Herbig; Justin Balk; Heiko Fischer; Johannes Arzberger; Achim Seifert; Simon Gattringer | 3:37 |
| 2. | "Unsere Nacht" (featuring Eko Fresh) | Mutzke; Herbig; Balk; Fresh; Fischer; Arzberger; Seifert; Gattringer | 4:33 |
| 3. | "Welt hinter Glas" | Muztke; Herbig; Balk; Fischer; Mark Cwiertnia; Arzberger; Seifert; Gattringer; Otto Block | 3:23 |
| 4. | "Meant to Be" | Mutzke; Fiora Cutler; Mark Tremain | 4:54 |
| 5. | "Magisch" | Mutzke; Herbig; Balk; Fischer; Arzberger; Seifert; Gattringer | 4:04 |
| 6. | "IOU" | Mutzke; Balk; Alexander Komlew | 4:09 |
| 7. | "Still the Same" | Mutzke; Herbig; Balk; Komlew; Fischer; Arzberger; Seifert; Gattringer | 4:34 |
| 8. | "Laut" | Mutzle; Herbig; Fischer; Cwiertnia; Arzberger; Seifert; Gattringer; Jan Stolterfoht; Block | 3:39 |
| 9. | "You Are All Around Me" | Mutzke; Herbig; Balk; Fischer; Arzberger; Seifert; Gattringer | 4:24 |
| 10. | "Ich ohne Dich" | Mutzke; Fischer; Arzberger; Seifert; Gattringer; Stolterfoht; Block | 3:56 |
| 11. | "You" | Mutzke; Fischer; Arzberger; Seifert; Gattringer; Luise Gruber | 4:27 |
| 12. | "The Love Before" | Mutzke; Herbig; Balk; Fischer; Arzberger; Seifert; Gattringer | 3:46 |
| 13. | "Hier bin ich Sohn" | Mutzke; Herbig; Fischer; Jasmin Shakeri; Arzberger; Seifert; Gattringer; Stolterfoht; Block | 4:47 |

iTunes bonus tracks
| No. | Title | Length |
|---|---|---|
| 14. | "Original Girl" | 4:16 |
| 15. | "Not Right" | 4:43 |
| 16. | "Not the Only One" | 4:40 |
| 17. | "Welt hinter Glas" (Radio Edit) | 3:18 |

== Charts ==
| Chart (2015) | Peak position |
|---|---|
| German Albums (Offizielle Top 100) | 37 |

== Release history ==
| Region | Date | Format | Label |
|---|---|---|---|
| Austria | 12 June 2015 | Digital download; CD | Columbia, Sony |
| Germany | 12 June 2015 | Digital download; CD | Columbia, Sony |
| Switzerland | 12 June 2015 | Digital download; CD | Columbia, Sony |
