= Max Mutzke (album) =

Studio album by Max Mutzke
- Released: 7 January 2005
- Genre: Pop; soul
- Label: Rare; Warner
- Producer: Stefan Raab

Max Mutzke chronology
Max Mutzke (2005)	...aus dem Bauch (2007)

Max Mutzke is the debut studio album by German recording artist Max Mutzke. It was released by Rare Records and Warner Music Group on 7 January 2005 in German-speaking Europe after he had won both the talent contest SSDSGPS on the ProSieben late-night talk show TV total and Germany 12 Points!, Germany's national final for the Eurovision Song Contest 2004.

Chiefly written and produced by TV total host Stefan Raab, Max Mutzke includes songs in German and English language and was preceded by the singles "Can't Wait Until Tonight," his ESC entry, and "Schwarz auf weiß." Upon its release, it debuted atop the German Albums Chart and was eventually certified gold by the Bundesverband Musikindustrie (BVMI).

== Track listing ==
No.	Title	Writer(s)	Length
1.	"Schwarz auf weiß"	Mutzke; Stefan Raab	4:16
2.	"Catch Me If You Can"	Raab	3:46
3.	"Du wirst sehn"	Mutzke; Raab	4:29
4.	"Can't Wait Until Tonight"	Raab	3:02
5.	"C'Mon People"	Mousse T.; Errol Rennalls	3:53
6.	"Nur du"	Mutzke; Raab	3:33
7.	"Ain't No Sunshine"	Bill Withers	3:09
8.	"Mehr als nur das"	Mutzke; Raab	3:55
9.	"You"	Raab	4:04
10.	"Spür dein Licht"	Mutzke; Raab	3:58
11.	"Weg von hier"	Mutzke; Raab; Jürg Schmidhauser	3:49
12.	"You" (Akustik Version)	Raab	2:15
13.	"Schwarz auf weiß" (Remix)	Mutzke; Raab	4:08

== Charts ==
=== Weekly charts ===
Chart (2005)	Peak position
Austrian Albums (Ö3 Austria)	18
German Albums (Offizielle Top 100)	1
Swiss Albums (Schweizer Hitparade)	12

=== Year-end charts ===
Chart (2005)	Position
German Albums (Offizielle Top 100)	45

== Certifications ==
Region	Certification	Certified units/sales
Germany (BVMI)	Gold	100,000^{^}
^{^} Shipments figures based on certification alone.

== Release history ==
Region	Date	Format	Label
Austria	7 January 2005	Digital download; CD	Rare, Warner
Germany	7 January 2005	Digital download; CD	Rare, Warner
Switzerland	7 January 2005	Digital download; CD	Rare, Warner
