= Max Mutzke =

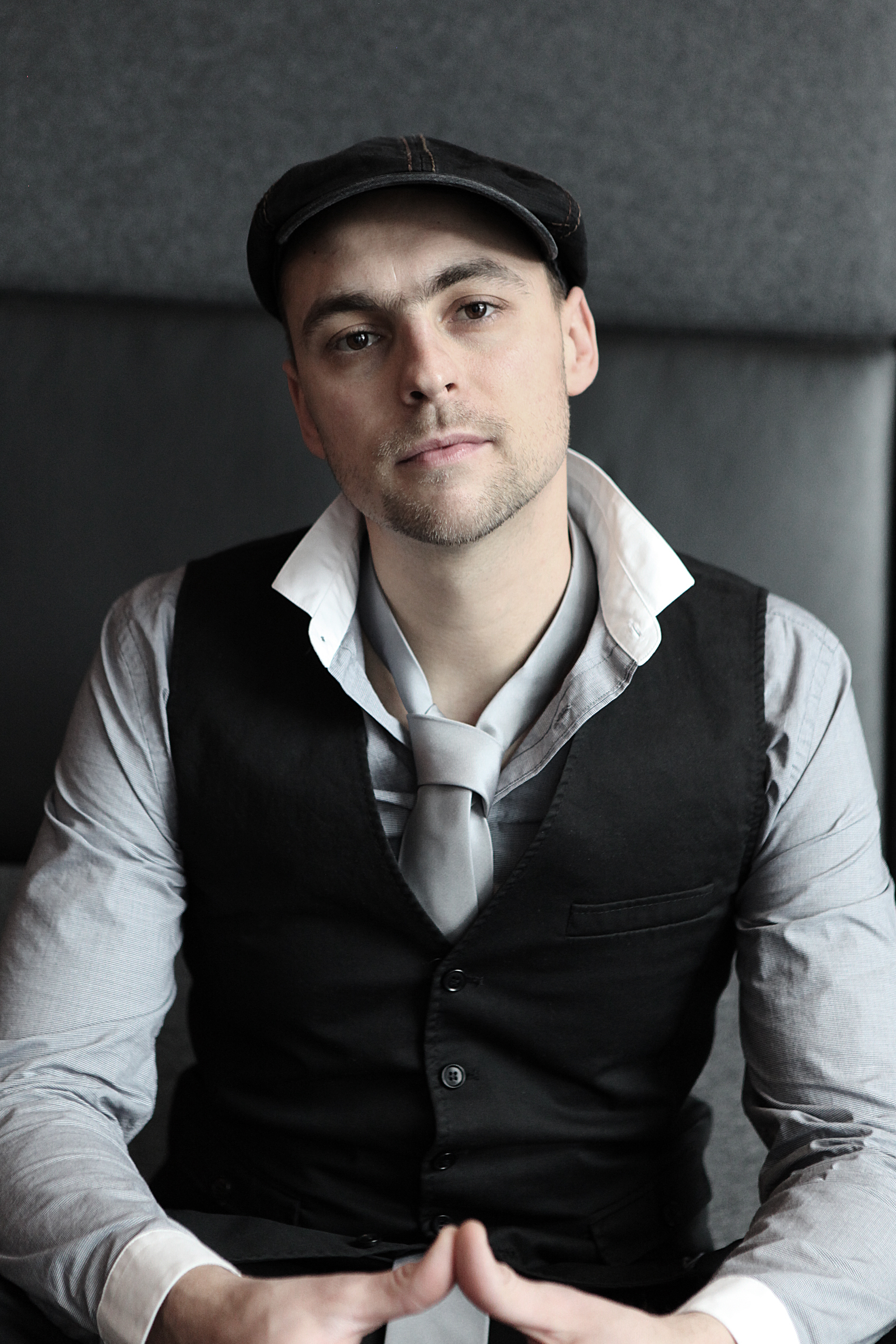
- Mutzke in 2013

Background information
- Born: Maximilian Nepomuk Mutzke; 21 May 1981 (age 44); Waldshut-Tiengen, West Germany
- Genres: Soul, funk, pop, jazz
- Occupations: Singer, musician, songwriter
- Years active: 2004–present (solo)
- Labels: Raab; Columbia; Sony
- Website: maxmutzke.de

Maximilian Nepomuk Mutzke (born 21 May 1981) is a German singer, songwriter and television personality. He gained public interest in early 2004 when he won SSDSGPS, a talent contest hosted in Stefan Raab's late-night show TV total. Mutzke subsequently qualified for and won the national pre-selection for the Eurovision Song Contest 2004, Germany 12 Points!, and thus represented Germany with his debut single "Can't Wait Until Tonight" that year, eventually finishing eighth in a field of 24 participants. Meanwhile, "Can't Wait Until Tonight" debuted atop the German singles chart and became a top five hit in Austria and Switzerland. His eponymous debut album, a mixture of soul and pop songs in German and English language, was released in January 2005 and also reached number one in Germany, where it was certified gold by the Bundesverband Musikindustrie (BVMI).

Mutzke followed this with a series of studios albums, which were released to varying commercial success, including ...aus dem Bauch (2007), Black Forest (2008), Home Work Soul (2010), Durch Einander (2012), Max (2015) and Colors (2018). In 2014, he represented Baden-Württemberg at the Bundesvision Song Contest 2014, where he finished seventh with his song "Charlotte". In 2019, Mutzke won the debut season of the German edition of the international music game show The Masked Singer. For his work as a recording artist, Mutzke has won several high-profile prizes such as the 1LIVE Krone and the Goldene Stimmgabel. Beyond his music career, he has been featured as a coach on the reality competition television series Dein Song.

== Career ==
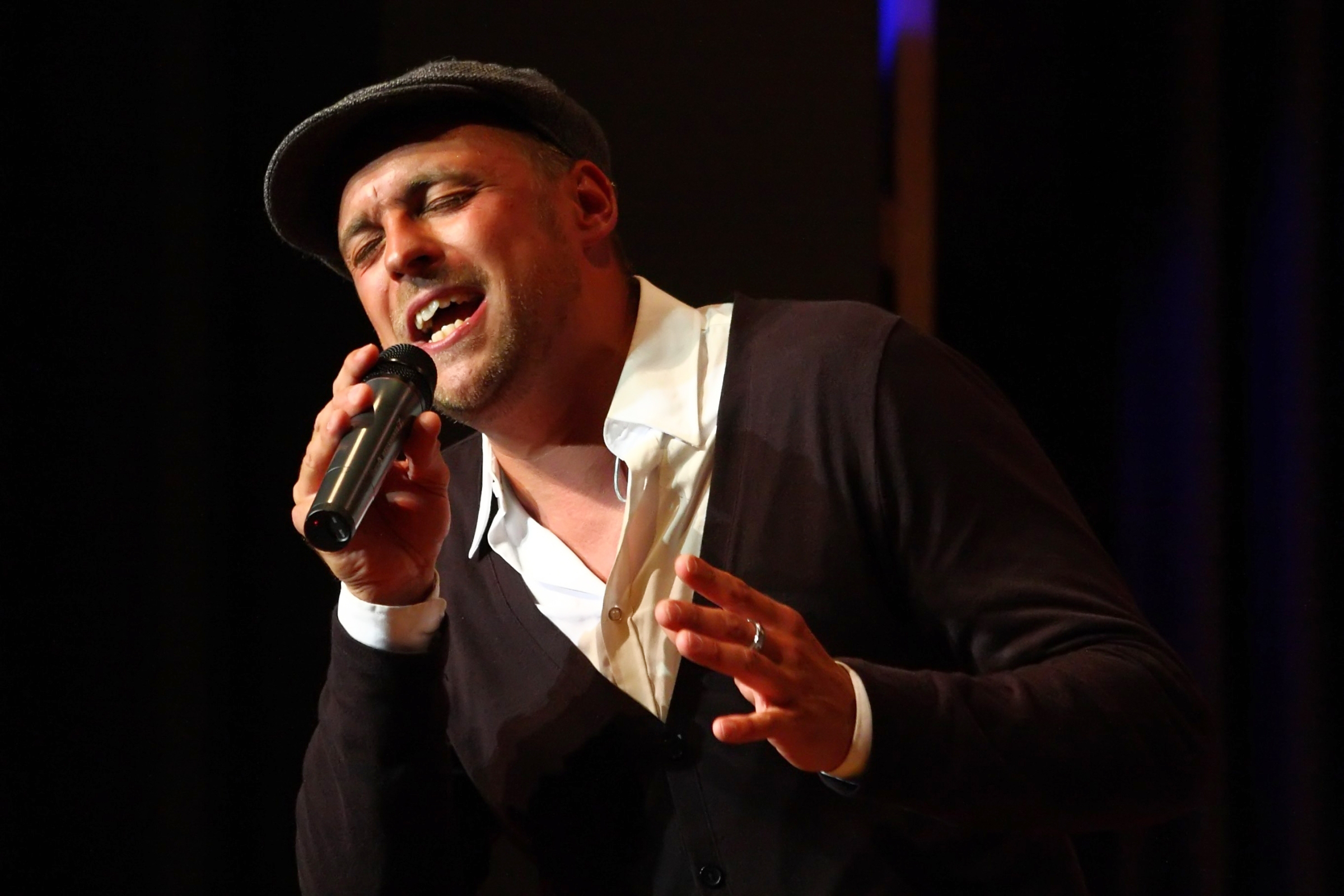
Mutzke in 2011

Mutzke started his career in a funk band called Project Five. He gained public interest in spring 2004 when he won SSDSGPS (Stefan sucht den Super-Grand-Prix-Star), a talent contest hosted in Stefan Raab's Late-Night-Show TV total. Afterwards he released his first single "Can't Wait Until Tonight" (composed by Raab), which entered the German single charts at No. 1 on 22 March 2004 and eventually met the conditions laid down for Max to be admitted into Germany's pre-selection for the Eurovision Song Contest 2004 as a wild-card entry.

In the televoting of the final show on 19 March 2004 Max defeated nine other competitors (including established artists like Scooter or Sabrina Setlur). A majority of 92.95% of all votes made him the German entry for the 49th Eurovision Song Contest in Istanbul, where he finished eighth with 93 points.

Thereupon the singer went back to school and passed his final high school examination, before teaming up with Raab once again to finish his self-titled solo album in summer 2004. The record, a mixture of funk, soul and pop in German and in English language, debuted at No. 1 on the German album charts and spawned the singles "Schwarz Auf Weiß", "Spür Dein Licht" and "Catch Me If You Can". From May to June 2005 Max then went on a club tour across Germany, Austria and Switzerland, before touring with Katie Melua.

His second album Max Mutzke ...aus dem Bauch was released on 8 June 2007. His third album "Max Mutzke ... Black Forest" was released on 28 November 2008.

In 2010, he co-wrote the song "I Care for You" for Jennifer Braun, who placed second in the German national final for the Eurovision Song Contest 2010.

In 2020, Mutzke represented The Moon in the Free European Song Contest 2020 (which served as a replacement for that year's Eurovision Song Contest due to it being cancelled due to the COVID-19 pandemic) under the name "Der Astronaut" with the song "Back to the Moon". It came in third place with 85 points.

He competed in the German national final for the Eurovision Song Contest 2024 with the song "Forever Strong", ultimately coming second.

== Discography ==
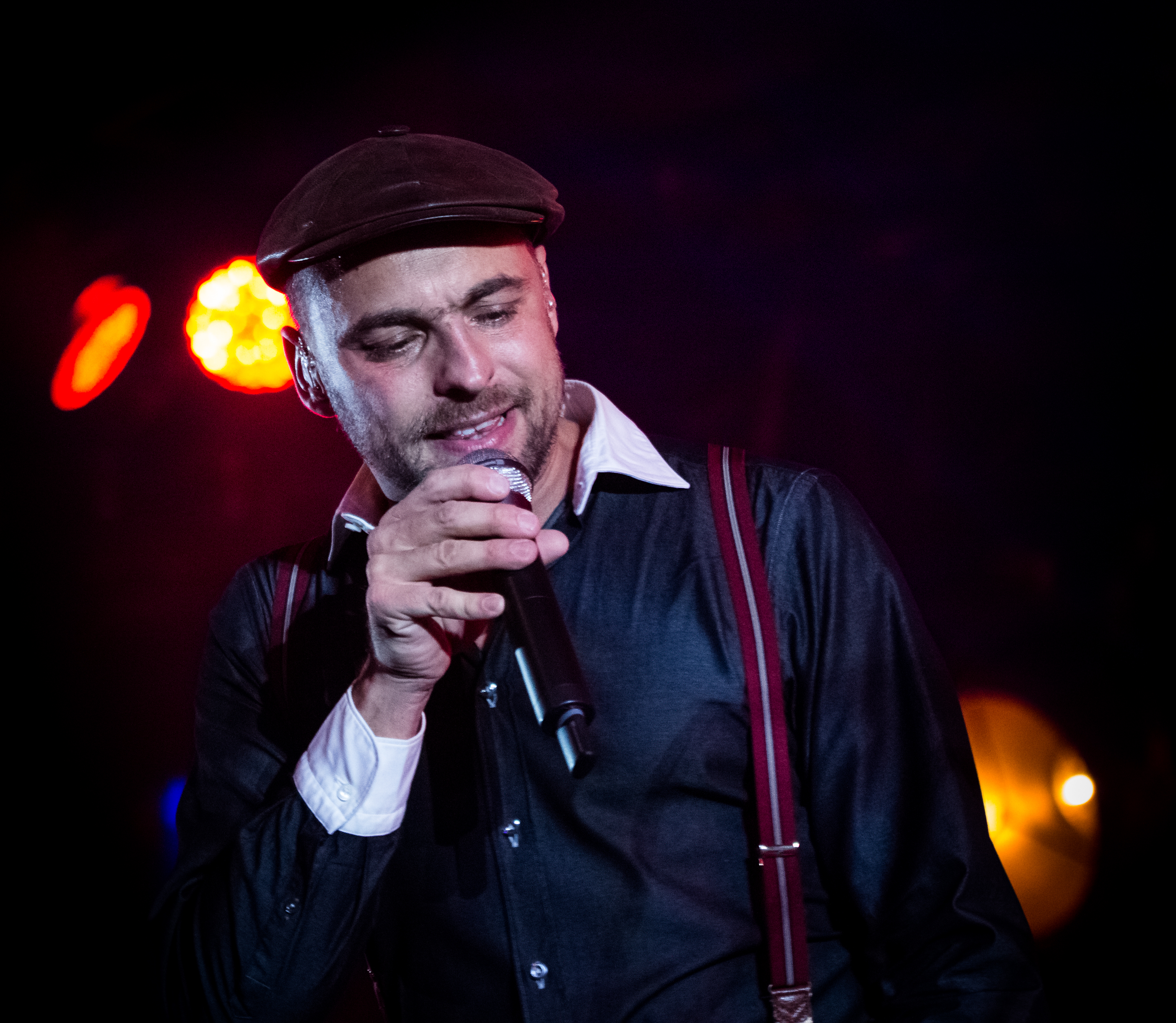
Mutzke performing in Leverkusen, November 2016

=== Studio albums ===
Title	Album details	Peak positions			Certifications
Title	Album details	GER	AUT	SWI	Certifications
Max Mutzke	Released: 7 January 2005; Label: Rare, Warner; Formats: CD, digital download	1	18	12	BVMI: Gold
...aus dem Bauch	Released: 8 June 2007; Label: Rare, Warner; Formats: CD, digital download	11	40	57	
Black Forest	Released: 28 November 2008; Label: Warner; Formats: CD, digital download	52	—	—	
Home Work Soul	Released: 24 September 2010; Label: Warner; Formats: CD, digital download	50	—	—	
Durch Einander	Released: 14 September 2012; Label: Columbia; Formats: CD, digital download	28	54	—	
Max	Released: 12 June 2015; Label: Columbia; Formats: CD, digital download	37	—	—	
Colors	Released: 27 September 2018; Label: Columbia; Formats: CD, digital download	22	—	—	
Wunschlos süchtig	Released: 17 September 2021; Label: Columbia; Formats: CD, digital download	24	—	—	

=== Singles ===
List of singles, with selected chart positions and certifications, showing year released and album name
Title	Year	Peak chart positions			Certifications	Album
Title	Year	GER	AUT	SWI	Certifications	Album
"Can't Wait Until Tonight"	2004	1	2	4	GER: Platinum	Max Mutzke
"Schwarz auf Weiß"	2004	18	47	42		Max Mutzke
"Spür dein Licht"	2005	79	—	—		Max Mutzke
"Catch Me If You Can"	2005	—	—	—		Max Mutzke
"Mein Automobil"	2007	28	48	—		...aus dem Bauch
"Denn es bist Du"	2007	79	—	—		Lissi und der wilde Kaiser OST
"Marie"	2008	24	60	—		Black Forest
"New Day"	2008	40	—	—		Black Forest
"Let It Happen"	2010	85	—	—		Home Work Soul
"Charlotte"	2014	—	—	—		non-album release
"Welt hinter Glas"	2015	—	—	—		Max
"Unsere Nacht" (featuring Eko Fresh)	2015	—	—	—		Max
"So viel mehr"	2016	—	—	—		Experience
"Zugabe (Show meines Lebens)"	2018	—	—	—		Colors
"Schwerelos"	2019	—	—	—		non-album release
"Wunschlos süchtig"	2021	—	—	—		Wunschlos süchtig
"Beste Idee"	2021	—	—	—		Wunschlos süchtig
"Dieselbe Sonne"	2021	—	—	—		Wunschlos süchtig

Preceded by Lou with Let's Get Happy	Germany in the Eurovision Song Contest; 2004	Succeeded by Gracia with Run & Hide
