= The Mighty Echoes =

American a cappella doo-wop quartet

- Origin: Los Angeles, California, United States
- Genres: A cappella, doo-wop
- Years active: 1987–present
- Labels: My T Records; Brooklyn International
- Members: Jon Rubin; Harvey Shield; Charlie Davis; John Lathan
- Past members: Joey Malore (1986-89); John Hostetter (1986-2001); Keith Joe Dick (2001-2003); John Fluker (2003-2009)
- Website: official site

The Mighty Echoes are an American a cappella doo-wop quartet from Los Angeles, California. The group was formed backstage at the Olio Theater in Silverlake, California during the production of Harvey Shield's 1986 musical 1284: The Pied Piper.

The Echoes went on to appear on many TV shows including Frank's Place, Family Matters, Brooklyn Bridge, Murphy Brown, a stint as Tony Danza's high school singing group on Who's the Boss? and more recent appearances on It's Always Sunny in Philadelphia and The Suite Life of Zack & Cody. The group appeared in one feature film, the Dennis Quaid / Debra Winger vehicle, Wilder Napalm. In the film, they sing "Ring of Fire", "Heat Wave", "Duke of Earl" and "I Don't Want to Set the World on Fire". In his book, American Singing Groups: A History from 1940s to Today, Jay Warner calls the Echoes "the West Coast equivalent of the best East Coast a cappella groups of the last 20 years".

The Mighty Echoes perform regularly in Southern California and sporadically around the world. The group focuses primarily on songs either from or reminiscent of the classic doo-wop era.

== Member trivia ==
Founding member Harvey Shield was an original member of the 1960s British group Episode Six and wrote the last top ten hit for the Bay City Rollers, "The Way I Feel Tonight". Jon Rubin, first tenor, is also the lead singer for the 1970s power pop band the Rubinoos. Both Charlie Davis and John Lathan have a Broadway background. Former member John Hostetter was a regular on the sitcom Murphy Brown.

== Discography ==
- A Cappella Doo Wop (1992)
- Love from Echo Park (1996)
- Doo Wop 'Til You Drop (2003)
- A Cappella Cool (2006)
- Doo Wop Around the Christmas Tree (2006)
