= Where Will I Be Now =

- US single sleeve

Single by Bay City Rollers

from the album Strangers in the Wind
- Released: 1978
- Recorded: 1978
- Genre: Rock, pop
- Length: 3:29
- Label: Arista, Toshiba/EMI, Electrola
- Songwriter(s): Chris East
- Producer(s): Harry Maslin

Bay City Rollers singles chronology
"Don't Let the Music Die" (1977)	"Where Will I Be Now" (1978)	"Another Rainy Day in New York City" (1978)

Alternative cover
- Japanese single sleeve

"Where Will I Be Now" is a pop single by the Bay City Rollers. It was the first of three singles released from their 1978 album Strangers in the Wind. The tune, written by British songwriter Chris East and featuring a lead vocal by Les McKeown, is an uptempo song with a heavily-orchestrated disco-style arrangement. It was released as a 7" vinyl single in Japan, Germany, and the United States.

"Where Will I Be Now" became a chart hit in Germany, reaching number 48. The song was the most successful single from the album, and it marked the Rollers' final appearance on any national music chart.

== Track listing ==
1. "Where Will I Be Now" - 3:29
2. "If You Were My Woman" - 3:13

== Credits ==
- Producer - Harry Maslin
- Written By - Chris East

== Chart performance ==
- Germany: #48
