= Pat McGlynn =

Scottish musician (born 1958)

- Born: Patrick James McGlynn; March 31, 1958 (age 68); Edinburgh, Scotland
- Origin: United Kingdom
- Genres: Pop, rock, power pop
- Occupations: Musician, songwriter, composer
- Instruments: Guitar, bass, rhythm, lead vocals in his own band , backing vocals in the Bay City Rollers
- Years active: 1976–present

Patrick James "Pat" McGlynn (born 31 March 1958 in Edinburgh, Scotland) is a rhythm guitarist for the Bay City Rollers.

In late 1976, McGlynn joined the Rollers as a replacement for band member Ian Mitchell. McGlynn usually played rhythm guitar in the band, occasionally switching to bass on stage in songs that featured Stuart Wood on keyboards. During his tenure, McGlynn contributed to the band's studio recordings, notably appearing on the albums It's a Game (1977) and Strangers in the Wind (1978), the latter of which features his work on the track "The Pie."

In 1977, McGlynn released "She'd Rather Be with Me", which peaked at number 65 in Australia.

McGlynn left the band in May the following year, and would subsequently enjoy major success in Japan and Germany as leader of his own band, Pat McGlynn's Scotties. In 1993, his composition "So Much of Your Love" was sung by Sonia in the British heat of the Eurovision Song Contest.

In 2003, McGlynn accused former Bay City Rollers manager Tam Paton of trying to rape him in a hotel room in 1977. However, the police decided there was insufficient evidence to prosecute Paton. Paton was later arrested and convicted for sexual misconduct with underage boys.
