= ...aus dem Bauch =

Studio album by Max Mutzke
- Released: 8 June 2007
- Genre: Pop; soul
- Label: Rare; Warner
- Producer: Stefan Raab

Max Mutzke chronology
Max Mutzke (2005)	...aus dem Bauch (2007)	Black Forest (2008)

...aus dem Bauch (...from the Belly) is the second studio album by German recording artist Max Mutzke. It was released by Rare Records and Warner Music Group on 8 June 2007 in German-speaking Europe.

== Track listing ==
No.	Title	Writer(s)	Length
1.	"Eigentlich immer"	Mutzke; Stefan Raab; B.H.M. Müller	4:23
2.	"Mein Automobil"	George Clinton Jr.; Clarence Haskins	3:25
3.	"Like a Fire"	Mutzke; Raab	3:32
4.	"Musik kommt aus dem Bauch"	Mutzke; Raab; Jürg Schmidhauser	3:56
5.	"Lass mich nicht gehn"	Mutzke; Raab; Schmidhauser	3:55
6.	"What a Fool Believes"	Michael McDonald; Kenny Loggins	4:42
7.	"Drei Schritte rückwärts"	Mutzke; Raab; Schmidhauser	5:34
8.	"Schön hier zu sein"	Mutzke; Raab; Schmidhauser	3:55
9.	"Tag für Tag"	Mutzke; Raab	3:43
10.	"Weil ich dich liebe"	Mutzke; Raab	3:49
11.	"Wir verliern uns nicht für immer"	Mutzke; Raab	3:39
12.	"Song für dich"	Mutzke; Raab	3:25

== Charts ==
Chart (2007)	Peak position
Austrian Albums (Ö3 Austria)	40
German Albums (Offizielle Top 100)	11
Swiss Albums (Schweizer Hitparade)	57

== Release history ==
Region	Date	Format	Label
Austria	8 June 2007	Digital download; CD	Warner
Germany	8 June 2007	Digital download; CD	Warner
Switzerland	8 June 2007	Digital download; CD	Warner
