= Colors (Max Mutzke album) =

Studio album by Max Mutzke
- Released: 28 September 2018
- Label: Columbia; Sony

Max Mutzke chronology
Max (2015)	Colors (2018)	Wunschlos süchtig (2021)

Colors is the seventh studio album by German recording artist Max Mutzke. It was released by Columbia Records and Sony Music on 28 September 2018 in German-speaking Europe.

== Track listing ==
No.	Title	Writer(s)	Original artist(s)	Length
1.	"Augenbling"	Pierre Baigorry; Guido Craveiro; Jerome Bugnon; Frank A. Dellé; Sebastian Krajewski; David Conen; Tobias Cordes; Erik Jaster; Torsten Reibold	Seeed	4:27
2.	"Off the Ground"	Brandon Paak Anderson; Matt Merisola	Anderson Paak	3:21
3.	"White Lines"	Melvin Glover; Sylvia Robinson	Grandmaster Melle Mel and the Furious Five	4:05
4.	"No One Will Do"	Erik Ortiz; Kevin Crowe; Clifford L. Brown III; Dave Young; Bunny Sigler	Mary J. Blige	3:30
5.	"Regulate"	Gary Brown; Warren Griffin III; Mark Makonie; Arnez Blount	Warren G & Nate Dogg	4:11
6.	"Men in Black"	Will Smith; Fred Washington; Terri McFaddin; Patrice Rushen	Will Smith	4:32
7.	"I Got 5 on It"	George Brown; Ronald Bell; Jay King; Thomas McElroy; Denzil Foster; Garrick Husband; Jerold Ellis jr.; Anthony Gillmour; Claydes Smith; Robert Mickens; Richard Westfield; Dennis Thomas; Robert Bell; Donald Boyce	Luniz featuring Michael	3:51
8.	"Zu Dir komm ich heim"	Mutzke; Nico Suave; monoPunk		5:32
9.	"All Good?"	Chaka Khan; David Jolicoeur; Vincent Mason; David West; Kevin Mercer	De La Soul featuring Chaka Khan	4:17
10.	"Everyday People" (with Leslie Clio)	Sylvester Stewart	Sly and the Family Stone	3:38
11.	"Zugabe (Show meines Lebens)"	Mutzke; Keno Langbein; monoPunk		4:05
12.	"Horizont"	Mutzke; Langbein; monoPunk		4:14

== Charts ==
Chart (2018)	Peak position
German Albums (Offizielle Top 100)	22

== Release history ==
Region	Date	Format	Label
Austria	28 September 2018	Digital download; CD	Columbia; Sony
Germany	28 September 2018	Digital download; CD	Columbia; Sony
Switzerland	28 September 2018	Digital download; CD	Columbia; Sony
