= Home Work Soul =

Studio album by Max Mutzke
- Released: 24 October 2010
- Genre: Pop; soul
- Label: Raab; Warner
- Producer: OJA Tunes; Robert Koch

Max Mutzke chronology
Black Forest (2008)	Home Work Soul (2010)	Durch Einander (2012)

Home Work Soul is the fourth studio album by German recording artist Max Mutzke. It was released by Raab Records and Warner Music Group on 24 September 2010 in German-speaking Europe.

== Track listing ==
No.	Title	Writer(s)	Length
1.	"High on Your Love"	OJA Tunes; Alexander Komlew; Robert Koch; Albert Gottschewski; Marcus Winter John; Oren Gerlitz	3:21
2.	"Let It Happen"	Lemar Obika; Mathias Wollo	3:16
3.	"Wake Me Up in Vegas"	Gabriel Schwarz; Johannes Berger; Thomas Azier	3:44
4.	"Can't Stop" (featuring Sebastian Madsen)	Madsen	3:27
5.	"Fever"	Mutzke; Justin Balk	3:17
6.	"I Can't Get You"	Mutzke; Balk	3:38
7.	"Different Tonight"	Mutzke; Balk	3:51
8.	"Y.O.U."	Mutzke; Michael Kersting; Oli Rüger; Baret Davidian	3:38
9.	"Feel the Heat"	Kersting; Rüger	4:14
10.	"Music"	Mutzke; Balk; Rüger	3:23
11.	"Easy Easy"	Balk	3:50
12.	"Forever"	Mutzke; Jan Pelao; Koch; Oren Gerlitz; P.O. Block	3:36
13.	"Bang Bang"	Mutzke; Kersting; Rüger; Davidian	3:26

== Charts ==
Chart (2010)	Peak position
German Albums (Offizielle Top 100)	50

== Release history ==
Region	Date	Format	Label
Austria	24 October 2010	Digital download; CD	Raab, Warner
Germany	24 October 2010	Digital download; CD	Raab, Warner
Switzerland	24 October 2010	Digital download; CD	Raab, Warner
