= Black Forest (album) =

Studio album by Max Mutzke
- Released: 28 November 2008
- Genre: Pop; soul
- Label: Raab; Warner
- Producer: Michael B.; Oliver Rüger

Max Mutzke chronology
...aus dem Bauch (2007)	Black Forest (2008)	Home Work Soul (2010)

Black Forest is the third studio album by German recording artist Max Mutzke. It was released by Raab Records and Warner Music Group on 28 November 2008 in German-speaking Europe.

== Track listing ==
No.	Title	Writer(s)	Length
1.	"Marie"	Oli Rüger; Tenzing Melanchton; Baret Davidian	3:31
2.	"St. Petersburg"	Pete Smith; Rüger; Melanchton; Kay Lee	3:22
3.	"New Day"	Rüger; Melanchton; Davidian	2:59
4.	"Girl in Tokyo"	Mutzke; Rüger; Melanchton; Davidian	3:27
5.	"Smile"	Rüger; Melanchton; Davidian; Stephan Sagurna	3:56
6.	"Not Right"	Rüger; Melanchton; Davidian	3:54
7.	"Misses Thompson"	Rüger; Melanchton; Davidian	3:58
8.	"Backyard"	Mutzke; Lennart A. Salomon; Rüger	3:42
9.	"Easy on You"	Rüger; Melanchton; Davidian	3:18
10.	"Bring on the Sun"	Robin Grubert; Alexander Zuckowski; Sascha Schmitz	3:14
11.	"Come Back"	Rüger; Melanchton; Davidian	3:43
12.	"Me & Lorraine"	Rüger; Melanchton; Davidian	3:00

iTunes bonus track
No.	Title	Length
1.	"Sunshine & Rain"	3:31

== Charts ==
Chart (2008)	Peak position
German Albums (Offizielle Top 100)	52

== Release history ==
Region	Date	Format	Label
Austria	28 November 2008	Digital download; CD	Raab, Warner
Germany	28 November 2008	Digital download; CD	Raab, Warner
Switzerland	28 November 2008	Digital download; CD	Raab, Warner
