= Harvey Shield =

English musician

- Born: Harvey Schildkraut; 6 September 1946 (age 79); Twickenham, London, England
- Origin: Wembley, England
- Genres: Pop, pop rock, a cappella, doo-wop
- Formerly of: Episode Six

Harvey Shield (born Harvey Schildkraut; 6 September 1946) is an English musician, songwriter and actor.

== Early life ==
Harvey Shield was born in Twickenham, London, England, and grew up in Wembley. In 1961 he was a drummer in the Cadet Pipe Band at Harrow County School where he met Roger Glover. They formed a beat group, the Madisons, in which Shield played drums and sang. In 1963 the Madisons merged with another school group, the Lightnings, and in 1964 the group became known as Episode Six.

== Career ==
=== Music ===
Following a residency at the Acadia Club in Frankfurt, Germany in April, 1965 Ian Gillan joined the group as lead singer. While with Episode Six, Shield recorded six singles for Pye Records, appeared on Ready Steady Go! and toured with Alan Price and Dusty Springfield. In 1966 Episode Six performed at the Casino du Liban in Beirut, Lebanon where he met Greek dancer and singer, Natasha Koumianou. In September 1967, he left the band to pursue a career with her. Later, Glover and Gillan left the band to join Deep Purple.

Koumianou and Shield's cabaret career began in Paris, where they recorded a single, "Honey", written by Shield, for Disques Vogue and continued performing until 1974 at nightclubs throughout Europe, the Middle East and Africa and aboard the ill-fated cruise ship, MS Achille Lauro.

In 1975, Shield moved to Los Angeles, where he wrote and recorded the song "The Way I Feel Tonight". In 1976, he signed with Atlantic Records and his recording of the song was released on the Atco Records label, credited to Shields, in 1977. The recording failed to make an impact commercially, but the song went on to become a worldwide hit for the Bay City Rollers in 1978.

In 1985, Shield's musical Hamelin: A Musical Tale from Rats to Riches written with Richard Jarboe and Matthew Wells, was produced off-Broadway at the Circle in the Square Theatre in Greenwich Village, New York following initial productions at the Olio in Los Angeles and Musical Theater Works in New York.

In 1986, Shield formed The Mighty Echoes, an a cappella doo-wop quartet, which has recorded five albums and continues to perform. They have been seen on stage, film and television in shows such as Who's The Boss?, Murphy Brown, Family Matters, The Suite Life of Zack & Cody and It's Always Sunny In Philadelphia.

In 2019 Shield co-founded the Los Angeles-based Old Man Dinner Band with Pete Thomas.

=== Acting ===
As a movie actor, Shield serenaded Debra Winger in Wilder Napalm (1993), negotiated with Pamela Anderson in Barb Wire (1996), played a coke-snorting Brit in Crazy Eyes (2012) and acted as messenger for Timothée Chalamet in "Marty Supreme" (2025).

In 2015, Shield was cast as "legendary" rock drummer, Keith Edwards, in the Disney TV series I Didn't Do It.

== Filmography ==
=== Film ===
Year	Title	Role	Notes
1993	Wilder Napalm	Moe, Singing Firemen	
1996	Barb Wire	Dad	
2012	Crazy Eyes	British Man	

=== Television ===
Year	Title	Role	Notes
1988	Frank's Place	The Haystackers	Episode: "Night Business"
1988, 1991	Who's the Boss?	D.J.	2 episodes
1989, 1994	Murphy Brown	Singing Accountant / The Mighty Echoes	2 episodes
1994	Family Matters	Karaoke Doo Wop Singer	Episode: "Aunt Oona"
2007	The Suite Life of Zack & Cody	Murray	Episode: "Sleepover Suite"
2007	It's Always Sunny in Philadelphia	Crazy Legs	Episode: "The Gang Sells Out"
2015	I Didn't Do It	Keith Edwards	2 episodes
2016	Scream Queens	Butler	Episode: "Drain the Swamp"
