= Can't Wait Until Tonight =

2004 single by Maximilian Mutzke

Single by Max Mutzke

from the album Max Mutzke
- Released: 12 March 2004
- Genre: Pop; soul
- Length: 3:02
- Label: Rare; Warner
- Songwriter: Stefan Raab

Max Mutzke singles chronology
"Can't Wait Until Tonight" (2004)	"Schwarz auf Weiß" (2004)

Eurovision Song Contest 2004 entry
- Country: Germany
- Artist: Maximilian Mutzke
- As: Max
- Languages: English, Turkish
- Composer: Stefan Raab
- Lyricist: Stefan Raab

Finals performance
- Final result: 8th
- Final points: 93

Entry chronology
- ◄ "Let's Get Happy" (2003)
- "Run & Hide" (2005) ►

"Can't Wait Until Tonight" was the German entry in the Eurovision Song Contest 2004, performed in English and Turkish by Maximilian Mutzke. The song was written and composed by Stefan Raab, who previously had written both Guildo Horn's 1998 entry "Guildo hat euch lieb!" and his own "Wadde hadde dudde da?" in 2000.

Despite Germany having finished 11th at the 2003 contest and thus missing the automatic qualification that a top-ten berth would bring, the song was pre-qualified for the final as Germany (along with France, Spain and the United Kingdom) was part of the "Big Four" and guaranteed a final placing at any contest. Thus, it was performed eighth on the night, following the Netherlands' Re-union with "Without You" and preceding Albania's Anjeza Shahini with "The Image of You". At the close of voting, it had received 93 points, placing 8th in a field of 24. Until the 2009 contest, it was the last top 10 finish for a "Big Four" country. It also was Germany's last Top 10 place until its victory in 2010.

The song is a ballad, with Max singing about his desire for his lover and telling her that he "can't wait until tonight / for being with [her]". He goes on to tell her about how he felt the first time he saw her and how much he wants to prove his love.

The song was a jazz number, which UK commentator Terry Wogan likened to the music of the recent jazz phenomenon, Jamie Cullum (who would write an entry for Germany 8 years later). Max appeared dressed casually in a black jumper and trousers.

The performance was relatively subdued, however Max performed one chorus in Turkish, which was greeted with considerable applause by the crowd – the contest being held that year in Istanbul. In an interview after the performance, writer Stefan Raab jokingly told Sertab Erener that he had written the song specifically for her. Max was accompanied by Raab (on the acoustic guitar) and some members of the Heavytones (the band from TV total) during his gig.

It was succeeded as German representative at the 2005 contest by Gracia with "Run & Hide".

== Charts ==
=== Weekly charts ===
Chart (2004)	Peak position
Belgium (Ultratip Bubbling Under Flanders)	11
Austria (Ö3 Austria Top 40)	2
Germany (GfK)	1
Switzerland (Schweizer Hitparade)	4

=== Year-end charts ===
Chart (2004)	Position
Austria (Ö3 Austria Top 40)	11
Germany (Media Control GfK)	5
Switzerland (Schweizer Hitparade)	21
