= The Way I Feel Tonight =

Single by Bay City Rollers

from the album It's a Game
- B-side: "Love Power" (US) "Don't Let the Music Die" (Japan)
- Released: October 1977
- Recorded: 1977
- Genre: Soft rock, pop
- Length: 3:58
- Label: Arista
- Songwriter: Harvey Shield
- Producer: Harry Maslin

Bay City Rollers singles chronology
"You Made Me Believe in Magic" (1977)	"The Way I Feel Tonight" (1977)	"Don't Let the Music Die" (1977)

"The Way I Feel Tonight" is a pop ballad by the Bay City Rollers from their 1977 album It's a Game. The tune, written by Harvey Shield, and featuring a lead vocal by Les McKeown, is a slow, dramatic ballad with a heavily orchestrated arrangement.

The song was released as a 7" vinyl single in numerous territories, and had a peak position of No. 24 on the Billboard Hot 100 chart. It was the Rollers' final charting US single, but was also their second and highest entry on the Adult Contemporary chart, where it peaked at No. 16.

== Track listing ==
1. "The Way I Feel Tonight" - 3:58
2. "Love Power" - 3:35

== Credits ==
- Producer - Harry Maslin
- Written By - Harvey Shield

== Chart performance ==
Chart (1977–78)	Peak position
Australia (Kent Music Report)	56
Canada RPM Top Singles	23
New Zealand	38
U.S. Billboard Hot 100	24
U.S. Billboard Adult Contemporary	16
U.S. Cash Box Top 100	19
