= You Made Me Believe in Magic =

1977 single by Bay City Rollers

- British single picture sleeve

Single by Bay City Rollers

from the album It's a Game
- B-side: "Dance Dance Dance"
- Released: May 1977
- Recorded: 1976
- Genre: Pop, disco
- Length: 2:42
- Label: Arista
- Songwriter: Len Boone
- Producer: Harry Maslin

Bay City Rollers singles chronology
"It's a Game" (1977)	"You Made Me Believe in Magic" (1977)	"The Way I Feel Tonight" (1977)

"You Made Me Believe in Magic" is a 1977 international hit single by the Bay City Rollers, taken from their album It's a Game. The recording, a mid-tempo disco-styled pop tune featuring strings and horns, had its greatest impact in North America, where it was issued as the album's lead single in May 1977 to reach number 10 on the US Hot 100 in Billboard magazine that August. "You Made Me Believe in Magic" was the Bay City Rollers' third US Top 10 hit; the follow-up single "The Way I Feel Tonight" (#25) would mark the group's final Hot 100 appearance.

Outside the US, "You Made Me Believe in Magic" was typically issued as its parent album's second single, serving as a less successful followup to the "It's a Game" single: this was true in Australia (No. 36), Germany (No. 25), New Zealand (No. 39) and the UK (No. 34), where "You Made Me Believe in Magic" was the Bay City Rollers' twelfth and final chart hit. In Canada, however, the song enjoyed its greatest international popularity, where it peaked at number five, and ranks as the 68th greatest hit of 1977.

Chicago radio superstation WLS, which gave the song much airplay, ranked "You Made Me Believe in Magic" as the 27th most popular hit of 1977. It reached as high as number 2 on their survey of July 30, 1977.

== Track listing ==
1. "You Made Me Believe in Magic" – 2:41
2. "Dance Dance Dance" – 3:29 (US/Canada) | "Are You Cuckoo" – 4:02 (UK)

== Chart performance ==
=== Weekly charts ===
Chart (1977)	Peak position
Canada RPM Top Singles	5
Germany	25
UK	34
Australia	36
New Zealand	39
US Billboard Hot 100	10
US Cash Box Top 100	7

=== Year-end charts ===
Chart (1977)	Rank
Canada	68
US Billboard Hot 100	76
US Cash Box Top 100	59

== Bed & Breakfast version ==
"You Made Me Believe In Magic"

Single by Bed & Breakfast

from the album Stay Together
- Released: 10 March 1995
- Genre: Pop
- Length: 3:37
- Songwriter: Len Boone
- Producer: Harry Maslin

Bed & Breakfast singles chronology
"You Made Me Believe In Magic" (1995)	"If You Were Mine" (1995)

"You Made Me Believe In Magic" is the debut single by German boy band Bed & Breakfast. It was released in 1995.

== Music video ==
The music videos shows that they were in a cultural city and dancing at the desert.

== Charts ==
The song reached 68 in the GfK Entertainment charts.

== Cover versions ==
"You Made Me Believe In Magic" was covered by Hong Kong legendary pop singer, Leslie Cheung, in one of his earliest album, "Day Dreamin'", in 1978. The album failed commercially and making this LP super rare. The resale price of the original album "Day Dreamin'" could reach over USD1,500.

== Credits ==
- Written by Len Boone
- Cover photo photography by Arista
- Production by Jimmy Ienner (track B)
- Production and engineering by Harry Maslin (track A)

== Notes ==
- (P) 1977 Arista Records.

Made in Germany. EMI Electrola GmbH, Köln. Printed by Druckhaus Maack KG, 5880 Lüdenscheid.

GEMA LC 3484
