= Bed & Breakfast (band) =

Music group in Germany

Bed & Breakfast was a German boy band from Hamburg. They were founded in 1995 and became one of Germany's first and, at the time, most successful boy bands, though they had little success outside of the German-speaking world. Their most successful song abroad was "If You Were Mine".

== Personnel ==
- Florian Walberg
- Kofi Ansuhenne
- Daniel Aminati (now Pro7 host)
- David Jost (now manager for Tokio Hotel)

== History ==
Bed & Breakfast released their debut EP 'Stay Together' in 1995, peaking at #20 in the German Album Charts. This album was produced by MAAD Records (with whom Bed & Breakfast remained throughout their career).

== Discography ==
=== Studio albums ===
- Stay Together (1995)
- In Your Face (1996)
- The Singles Collection (1998)
- Deep In My Mind (2000) Germany released

=== Singles ===
- "You Made Me Believe in Magic" (1995)
- "If You Were Mine" (1995)
- "Stay Together" (1995)
- "If I Could Change the World" (1996)
- "I Will Follow You" (1996)
- "Falling in Love" (1996)
- "Get It Right" (1997)
- "All I Wanna Do" (1997)
- "Deep in My Mind" (1999)
