= It's a Game (Bay City Rollers album) =

1977 pop-rock album

Studio album by Bay City Rollers
- Released: July 1977
- Recorded: 1977
- Genres: Pop; rock
- Label: Arista
- Producer: Harry Maslin

Bay City Rollers chronology
Dedication (1976)	It's a Game (1977)	Strangers in the Wind (1978)

It's a Game is the seventh album, and sixth studio album, released by Scottish band, the Bay City Rollers. The album was released in July 1977 via Arista, and was supported by its lead single, "It's a Game" in the United Kingdom, whilst "You Made Me Believe in Magic" was released as the lead single from the album in North America. Elsewhere, "You Made Me Believe in Magic" was released as the album's second official single.

The album received moderate commercial success internationally, reaching number one in Japan, as well as reaching the top twenty in Australia, Canada and the UK, as well as the top thirty on the Billboard 200 in the United States.

== Background ==
It's a Game was the band's fifth original studio album, and featured production by Harry Maslin, fresh from his success with David Bowie. Despite receiving a Gold Album certification in the US, the group's popularity had waned considerably since their initial burst of fame, and this and subsequent albums would see diminishing success. Guitarist Ian Mitchell, present on the Dedication LP, had quit the band in late 1976, to be replaced by Pat McGlynn. McGlynn toured with the group and participated in initial sessions for It's a Game, but was soon dismissed from the band. McGlynn is present in the music video for the title track, indicating he is at least somewhat present on the album. After McGlynn's departure the band briefly continued on as a 4-piece. The band would expand to a quintet again in 1978 as founding member Alan Longmuir re-joined the fold.

== Release and promotion ==
Professional ratings
Review scores
Source	Rating
AllMusic	2/5 stars

In the US the track "You Made Me Believe in Magic" was issued as lead single reaching No. 10 on the Hot 100 in Billboard in August 1977. Outside the US, the track "It's a Game", which had originally been a single in 1973 for British group String Driven Thing, was the usual first single off its parent album with Top Ten status achieved in Australia (#9), Austria (#9), Germany (#4), Ireland (#6) and Switzerland (#6) also reaching No. 21 in New Zealand and No. 16 in the UK; in the UK "It's a Game" was the twelfth Bay City Rollers chart hit and the first single of that twelve to peak below the Top Ten.

"You Made Me Believe in Magic" was released as a second single in the territories where the "It's a Game" single had been a hit, with "You Made Me Believe in Magic" proving significantly less popular than the precedent single, the relevant peaks for "You Made Me Believe in Magic" being Australia – No. 36, Germany – No. 25, New Zealand – No. 39 and the UK – No. 34, with no chart placing in Austria, Ireland or Switzerland. "You Made Me Believe in Magic" marked the Bay City Rollers' final UK chart appearance. Another track off the It's a Game album: "The Way I Feel Tonight", was issued as a second single in the US where it marked the Bay City Rollers' final Hot 100 appearance peaking at No. 24; outside the US "The Way I Feel Tonight" was the third single off the album charting in Australia (No. 56) and New Zealand (No. 38).

It's a Game was reissued on CD with three bonus tracks in October 2007 ("Are You Cuckoo", "Dedication (Les McKeown Version)" and "The Way I Feel Tonight (single version)".

== Critical reception ==
Ace Adams of the New York Daily News called It's a Game, "a terrific album." Donald A. Guarisco of Allmusic, in a 2/5 stars review claimed, "Overall It's a Game is too diffuse and uneven for casual listeners, but hardcore Bay City Rollers fans will no doubt find it to be an intriguing listen."

== Track listing ==
=== Side one ===
1. "It's a Game" (Chris Adams)
2. "You Made Me Believe in Magic" (Len Boone)
3. "Don't Let the Music Die" (Faulkner, Wood)
4. "Love Power" (Teddy Vann)
5. "The Way I Feel Tonight" (Harvey Shield)

=== Side two ===
1. "Love Fever" (Faulkner, Wood)
2. "Sweet Virginia" (Faulkner, Wood, Longmuir, McKeown, McGlynn)
3. "Inside a Broken Dream" (McKeown)
4. "Dance, Dance, Dance" (Faulkner, Wood)
5. "Rebel Rebel" (David Bowie)

== Personnel ==
- Eric Faulkner – guitar, vocals
- Derek Longmuir – drums, vocals
- Les McKeown – lead vocals
- Stuart "Woody" Wood – bass guitar, vocals
- Pat McGlynn - rhythm guitar on "It's a Game"

== Charts ==
Chart (1977)	Peak position
Australian Albums (Kent Music Report)	10
Austrian Albums (Ö3 Austria)	6
Canadian Albums (RPM)	14
Finnish Albums (Suomen virallinen lista)	9
German Albums (Offizielle Top 100)	4
Japanese Albums (Oricon)	1
New Zealand Albums (RIANZ)	12
Swiss Albums (Schweizer Hitparade)	2
UK Albums (Official Charts)	18
US Billboard 200	23

== Certifications ==
Certifications for It's a Game
Region	Certification	Certified units/sales
United States (RIAA)	Gold	500,000^{^}
^{^} Shipments figures based on certification alone.
