= List of Bay City Rollers band members =

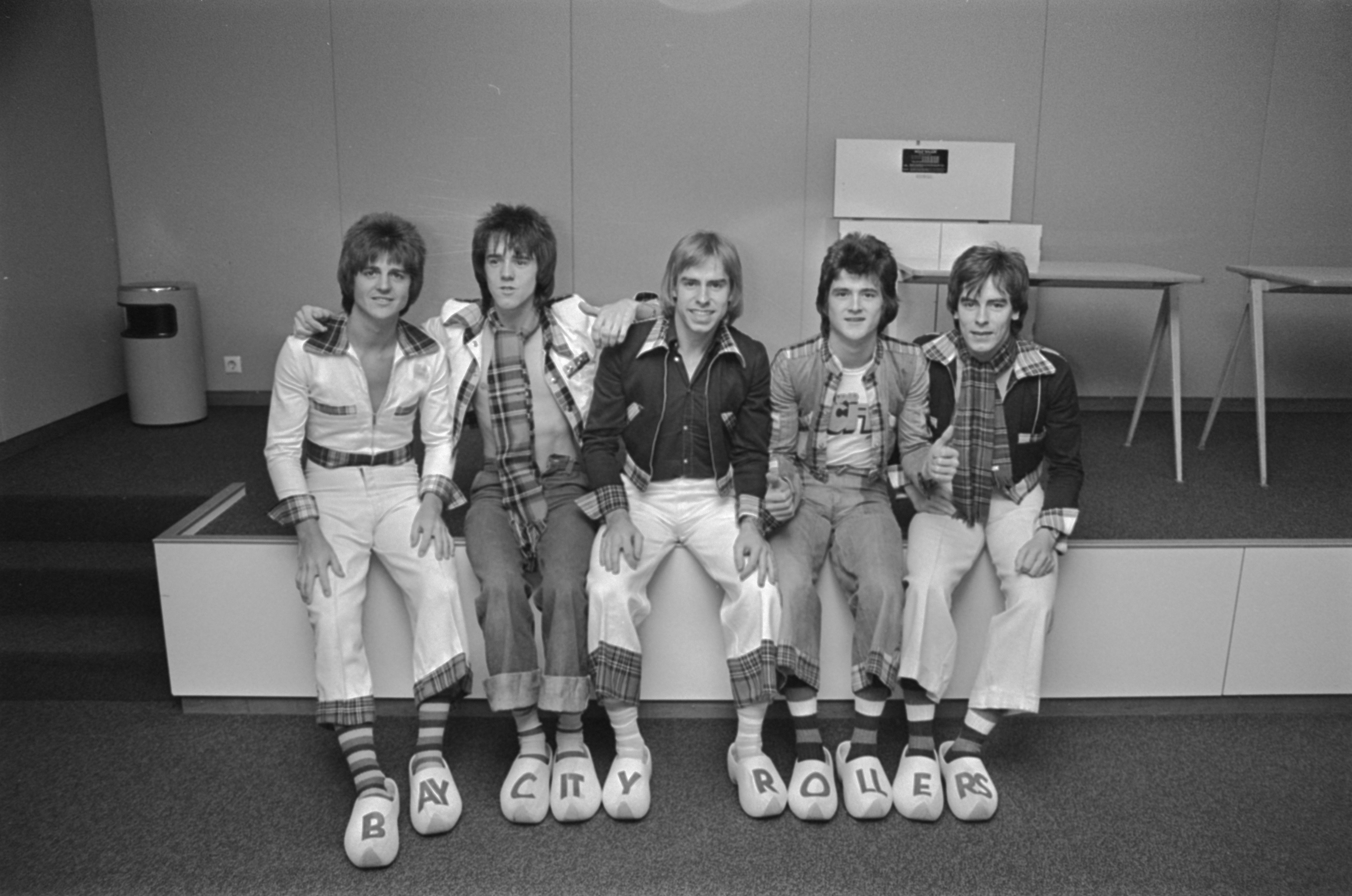
Bay City Rollers in 1976.

The Bay City Rollers (BCR) are a Scottish pop rock band from Edinburgh. Formed in 1967, the group originally featured co-lead vocalists Gordon "Nobby" Clark and Mike Ellison, guitarist Greg Ellison, bassist Alan Longmuir, keyboardist Dave Pettigrew, and drummer Derek Longmuir (Alan's older brother). The band has been through numerous lineup and name changes during its tenure, with the current lineup featuring guitarist Stuart "Woody" Wood (who first joined in 1974) alongside 2018 additions Ian Thomson (lead vocals, guitar) and Jamie McGrory (drums), plus 2023 arrivals Mikey Smith (bass) and John McLaughlin (keyboards, vocals).

== History ==
=== 1967–1978 ===
Bay City Rollers evolved from an earlier trio called the Ambassadors, formed by brothers Alan and Derek Longmuir in 1964, which later evolved into the Saxons and eventually became BCR. The first lineup of the group under the BCR name, in 1967, included vocalists Gordon "Nobby" Clark and Mike Ellison, guitarist Greg Ellison, keyboardist Dave Pettigrew, and Alan and Derek Longmuir on bass and drums, respectively. Shortly after Tam Paton became the group's manager, Mike Ellison left and Keith Norman joined as a second keyboardist. In the summer of 1968, Greg Ellison followed his brother in leaving BCR, citing creative differences with Paton. Pettigrew left at the same time, after Paton brought in Davie Paton instead of allowing him to take over Ellison's role on guitar.

Norman left around a year later, with Alan Dunn briefly taking his place. After "a matter of weeks", Dunn was forced to leave due to an arm injury, and was replaced by Billy Lyall. In March 1970, Eric Manclark was added to BCR on rhythm guitar. By October, Paton had been replaced by Neil Henderson, and by April the following year Lyall had been replaced by Archie Marr. This lineup released the band's first single, a cover of "Keep on Dancing" by the Gentrys, in October 1971. Shortly after the release of the second, "We Can Make Music", in March 1972, which failed to chart, both guitarists and Archie Marr left the Rollers. In June 1972, Henderson and Manclark were replaced by Eric Faulkner and John Devine, respectively, who performed on "Mañana" and "Saturday Night".

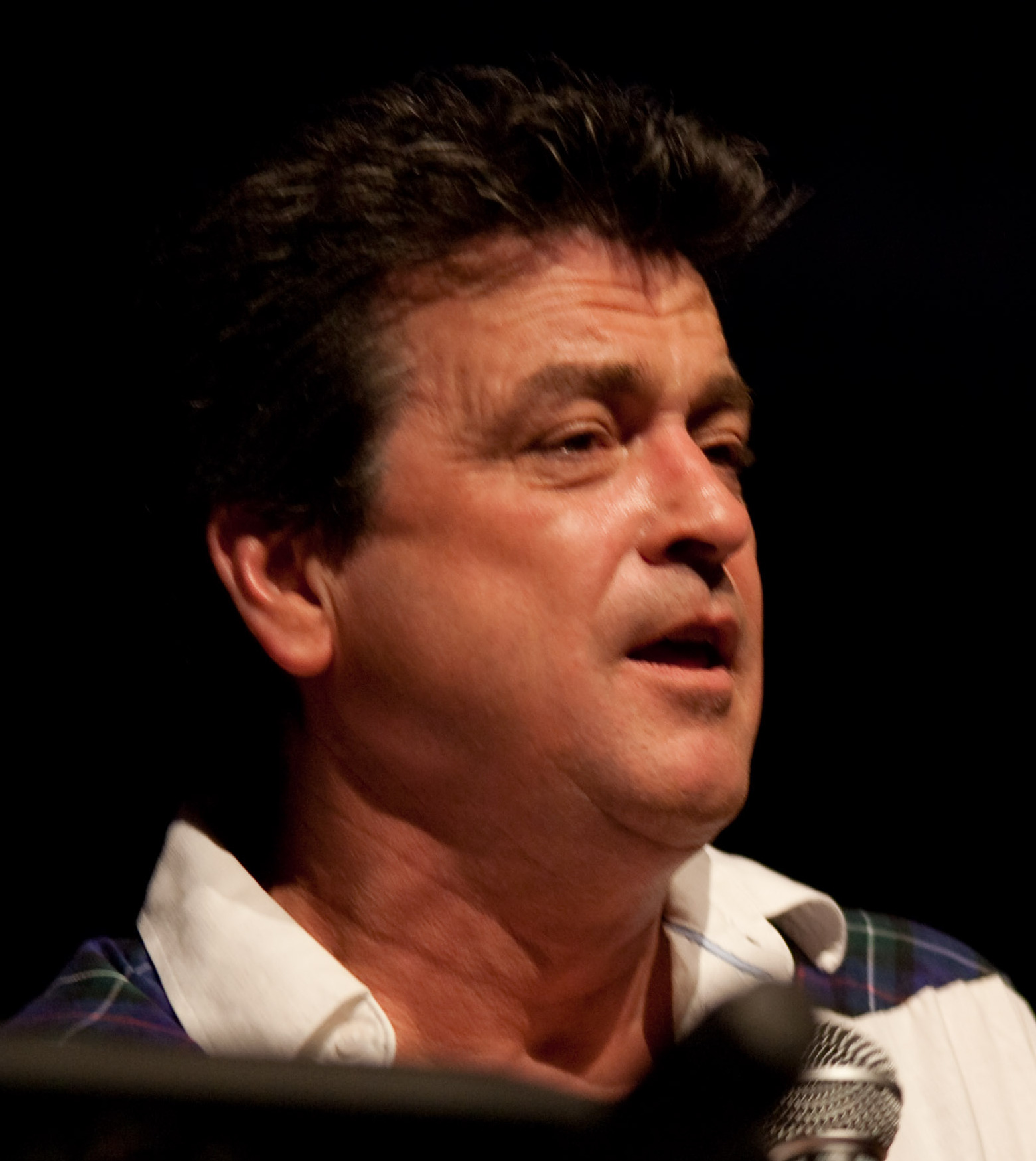
Bay City Rollers were fronted by Les McKeown from 1973 to 1978, then from 1982 to 1987.

By late-1973, Clark had left BCR due to frustration with their lack of success since "Keep on Dancing". He was replaced by Les McKeown, who joined "on or around" 18 November. The following January, Devine was replaced by Stuart "Woody" Wood, marking the finalisation of the band's 'classic' lineup. Over the next two years, the band released four studio albums – Rollin', Once Upon a Star, Wouldn't You Like It? and Rock n' Roll Love Letter. Alan Longmuir left the band in April 1976, replaced by guitarist Ian Mitchell with Wood switching to bass. BCR recorded Dedication in 1976, but by November Mitchell had been replaced by Pat McGlynn. Like his predecessor, McGlynn lasted only seven months in the group before he was sacked in May 1977, with the remaining four members opting to continue without a second guitarist. After releasing and touring in promotion of It's a Game in 1977, Alan Longmuir rejoined (now on guitar) in early 1978 for the recording of Strangers in the Wind.

=== 1978–1990 ===
By November 1978, BCR had parted ways with McKeown and replaced him with Duncan Faure. The band subsequently changed their name to the Rollers with the release of 1979's Elevator. After the release of two more albums – Voxx and Ricochet – the Rollers split up in the summer of 1981 following disappointing commercial performance. Within a year, however, the group had reformed, with McKeown returning as frontman in place of Faure. Early the following year, the group's lineup expanded to a seven-piece with the return of former members Ian Mitchell and Pat McGlynn, for a tour which spawned the album Live in Japan.

During recording of a new album in 1984, both Longmuir brothers left Bay City Rollers again, with Derek replaced by George Spencer. The album, Breakout, was released the following year, with the band embarking on a worldwide tour in promotion of its release. Former singer Duncan Faure appeared with the group at select shows in the UK, but was unable to join full-time due to travel restrictions. After a final tour without Eric Faulkner, the band broke up again in 1987.

Following the band's breakup, Faulkner formed the New Rollers with bassist Chris Ellen, keyboardist Kevin Peach, drummer Barry Roberts and backing vocalist Karen "Kass" Prosser. After a limited-release album Bay City Take Two, Andy Boakes replaced Ellen in June 1987, before guitarist Simon Stewart and drummer Mark Roberts were brought in to perform on the band's second release, the EP Party Harty. For the subsequent touring cycle and recording of second album Life Is a Wasteland, Faulkner, Prosser and Boakes were joined by guitarist Jason Medvec, keyboardist A. J. Nicholas and drummer John Richardson. Stewart and Mark Roberts returned in place of Nicholas and Richardson, respectively, for another tour in the summer of 1989, before Stuart Wood took over from Stewart in September that year. A final run of shows in Australia followed between September and November, before Medvec, Boakes and Roberts all left ahead of a planned reunion between Faulkner, Wood and Alan Longmuir.

=== 1990–2016 ===
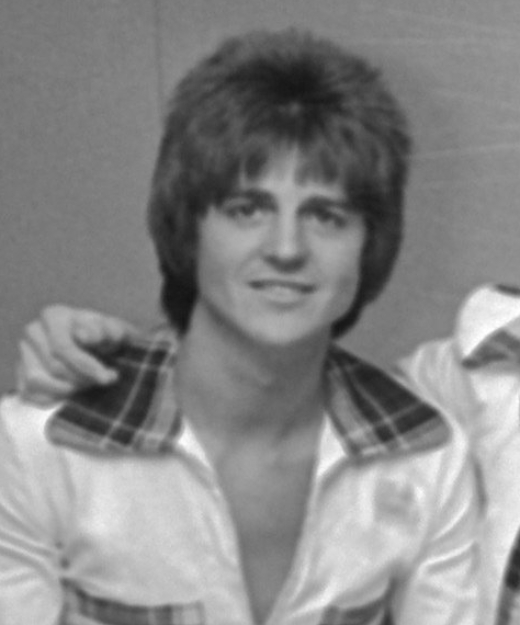
After McKeown's departure, Eric Faulkner fronted the Rollers in the late 80s and early 90s.

In February 1990, Alan Longmuir returned and the band reverted to the Bay City Rollers name. After releasing the fan-club only albums M62 and Bye Bye Baby in 1991 with drummer Phil Watts, Mark Roberts returned in February 1992 just as Greatest Hits, featuring re-recordings of a number of tracks, also received a limited release. Andy Boakes also returned on bass around the same time, with Longmuir switching back to rhythm guitar and keyboards alongside Stuart Wood. By the fall of 1992, Boakes had left again, with Wood switching back to bass and Simon Stewart rejoining to take his place on guitar. The group continued touring throughout the 1990s.

After several years of conflict, including lawsuits regarding the use of the band's name, a reunion of the 'classic' lineup of BCR was teased by Wood in early 1997. In March 1999, it was officially confirmed that the group had reunited, with former frontman Les McKeown and guitarist Eric Faulkner having reconciled during the filming of a documentary about the band. A few days after the announcement, it was confirmed that the new lineup would feature McKeown, Faulkner, Wood and Alan Longmuir together for the first time since McKeown's original departure in 1978. Longmuir had switched to keyboards several years earlier after suffering a heart attack.

On New Year's Eve 1999, BCR performed at Princes Street Gardens as part of Scotland's Hogmanay celebrations — their first show since reforming. The drummer for the performance was Dov Skipper. The reformation was short-lived, however, as the band returned to an inactive state shortly thereafter.

15 years after the initial reformation, McKeown, Wood and Alan Longmuir announced a second reunion of BCR in September 2015. The rest of the lineup was made up of members from McKeown's spin-off band: Phil Hendriks on guitar, Si Mulvey on bass, Scott McGowan on keyboards and Dan Guest on drums. The group played a number of shows at the end of 2015 into 2016, before Wood announced his departure live onstage at T in the Park on 9 July 2016. The group subsequently disbanded again.

=== Since 2018 ===
In March 2018, Wood announced a "new generation" of Bay City Rollers, reforming the band with new members Ian Thomson on lead vocals and rhythm guitar, Marcus Cordock on bass, Gary O'Hagan on keyboards, and Jamie McGrory on drums. Between 2018 and 2021, several former members of the band died — first, on 2 July 2018, Alan Longmuir died following a "short illness"; next, on 2 September 2020, former guitarist Ian Mitchell also died; and finally, on 22 April 2021, singer Les McKeown died "suddenly" at home. Later in 2021, the band released "Rollin' into Christmas" with Steve Morrison on drums and without O'Hagan. In March 2022, McGrory returned to BCR. By 2023, Cordock had been replaced by Mikey Smith, while the vacant keyboardist position had been taken over by John McLaughlin, with the band releasing "Brand New Day" that year. This was followed in 2024 by a new version of "Shang-a-Lang" to mark its 50th anniversary, as well as a new studio album, Keep on Rollin'.

Neil Henderson died on 20 September 2026, aged 73.

== Members ==
=== Current ===
Image	Name	Years active	Instruments	Release contributions
	Stuart "Woody" Wood	1974–1981; 1982–1987; 1989–2000; 2015–2016; 2018–present	guitars (Note: Wood's primary instrument was rhythm guitar from 1974 to 1976, 1989 to 1992 and 2015 to 2016, bass from 1976 to 1987 and 1999 to 2000, and has been lead guitar since 2018.); bass; keyboards; backing and occasional lead vocals	all Bay City Rollers (BCR) releases from Rollin' (1974) onwards, except New Rollers releases
	Ian Thomson	2018–present	lead and backing vocals; rhythm and lead guitars	all BCR releases from "Rollin' into Christmas" (2021) onwards
	Jamie "Jambo" McGrory	2018–2021; 2022–present	drums; percussion	all BCR releases from "Brand New Day" (2023) onwards
	Mikey Smith	2023–present	bass; backing vocals	all BCR releases from "Brand New Day" (2023) onwards
	John McLaughlin	2023–present	keyboards; backing and lead vocals	all BCR releases from "Brand New Day" (2023) onwards

=== Former ===
Image	Name	Years active	Instruments	Release contributions
	Derek Longmuir	1967–1981; 1982–1984	drums; percussion; backing vocals	all BCR releases from "Keep on Dancing" (1971) to Live in Japan (1983); Rollerworld: Live at the Budokan, Tokyo 1977 (2001)
	Alan Longmuir (1948–2018)	1967–1976; 1978–1981; 1982–1984; 1990–2000; 2015–2016	bass (Note: Longmuir's primary instrument was bass from 1967 to 1976, 1990 to 1991 and 2015 to 2016, rhythm guitar from 1978 to 1981, 1982 to 1984 and 1991 to 1994, and keyboards from 1995 to 2000.); rhythm guitar; keyboards; backing and occasional lead vocals	all BCR releases from "Keep on Dancing" (1971) to Rock n' Roll Love Letter (1976), and from Strangers in the Wind (1978) to Live in Japan (1983); M62 (1991); Bye Bye Baby (1991); Greatest Hits (1992); A Christmas Shang-a-Lang (2015); Live at Barrowland 2015 (2016)
	Gordon "Nobby" Clark	1967–1973	lead vocals; rhythm guitar	"Keep on Dancing" (1971)|"We Can Make Music" (1972)|"Mañana" (1972)|"Saturday Night" (1973)
	Dave "The Rave" Pettigrew	1967–1968	keyboards; backing vocals	none
	Greg Ellison	1967–1968	lead guitar; backing vocals	none
	Mike Ellison	1967	lead vocals	none
	Keith Norman	1967–1969	keyboards; backing vocals	none
	Davie Paton	1968–1970	lead guitar; backing vocals	none
	Alan Dunn	1969	keyboards; backing vocals	none
	Billy Lyall (1953–1989)	1969–1971	keyboards; backing vocals	none
	Eric Manclark	1970–1972	rhythm guitar; backing vocals	"Keep on Dancing" (1971); "We Can Make Music" (1972)
	Neil Henderson (1953–2026)	1970–1972	lead guitar; backing vocals	"Keep on Dancing" (1971); "We Can Make Music" (1972)
	Archie Marr (1952–2018)	1971–1972	keyboards; backing vocals	"Keep on Dancing" (1971); "We Can Make Music" (1972)
	Eric Faulkner	1972–1981; 1982–1985; 1987–2000	lead guitar; mandolin; violin; vocals (Note: Faulkner performed lead vocals for the New Rollers and "rebooted" Bay City Rollers from 1987 to 1999, before Les McKeown returned to the band.)	all BCR and New Roller releases from "Mañana" (1972) to Rollerworld: Live at the Budokan, Tokyo 1977 (2001)
	John Devine	1972–1974	rhythm guitar; backing vocals	"Mañana" (1972); "Saturday Night" (1973)
	Les McKeown (1955–2021)	1973–1978; 1982–1987; 1999–2000; 2015–2016	lead vocals; rhythm guitar	all BCR releases from Rollin' (1974) to Strangers in the Wind (1978); Live in Japan (1983); Breakout '85 (1985); Rollerworld: Live at the Budokan, Tokyo 1977 (2001); A Christmas Shang-a-Lang (2015); Live at Barrowland 2015 (2016)
	Ian Mitchell (1958–2020)	1976; 1983–1987	rhythm and lead guitars; backing vocals	Dedication (1976); Live in Japan (1983); Breakout '85 (1985)
	Pat McGlynn	1976–1977; 1983–1987	rhythm and lead guitars; backing vocals	Live in Japan (1983); Breakout '85 (1985)
	Duncan Faure	1978–1981; 1985 (select shows only)	lead vocals; synthesisers; piano; rhythm guitar	Elevator (1979); Voxx (1980); Ricochet (1981)
	George Spencer	1984–1987	drums; percussion	Breakout '85 (1985)
	Karen "Kass" Prosser	1987–1999	backing vocals	all New Rollers and BCR releases from Bay City Take Two (1987) to Greatest Hits (1992)
	Kevin Peach	1987–1988 (New Rollers)	keyboards; backing vocals	Bay City Take Two (1987); Party Harty (1988)
	Barry Roberts	1987–1988 (New Rollers)	drums; percussion	Bay City Take Two (1987)
	Chris Ellen	1987 (New Rollers)	bass; backing vocals	Bay City Take Two (1987)
	Andy Boakes	1987–1989 (New Rollers); 1991–	bass; backing vocals	Party Harty (1988); Life Is a Wasteland (1989)
	Mark Roberts	1988, 1989 (New Rollers); 1992–1999	drums; percussion	Party Harty (1988); Life Is a Wasteland (1989)
	Simon Stewart	1988, 1989 (New Rollers); 1992–1999	guitar; backing vocals	Party Harty (1988); Life Is a Wasteland (1989)
	Jason Medvec	1988–1989 (New Rollers)	guitar; backing vocals	none
	John Richardson	1988–1989 (New Rollers)	drums; percussion	none
	A. J. Nicholas	1988–1989 (New Rollers)	keyboards; backing vocals	none
	Phil Watts	1990–1992	drums	M62 (1991); Bye Bye Baby (1991); Greatest Hits (1992)
	Dov Skipper	1999–2000	drums	none
	Phil Hendriks	2015–2016	lead guitar	A Christmas Shang-a-Lang (2015); Live at Barrowland 2015 (2016)
	Si Mulvey	2015–2016	bass	A Christmas Shang-a-Lang (2015); Live at Barrowland 2015 (2016)
	Scott McGowan	2015–2016	keyboards	A Christmas Shang-a-Lang (2015); Live at Barrowland 2015 (2016)
	Dan Guest	2015–2016	drums	A Christmas Shang-a-Lang (2015); Live at Barrowland 2015 (2016)
	Marcus Cordock	2018–2023	bass; backing vocals	"Rollin' into Christmas" (2021)
	Gary O'Hagan	2018–2021	keyboards; backing vocals	none
	Steve Morrison	2021–2022	drums; percussion	"Rollin' into Christmas" (2021)

== Lineups ==
Period	Members	Releases
1967	Nobby Clark — lead vocals, rhythm guitar; Mike Ellison — lead vocals; Greg Ellison — lead guitar, backing vocals; Alan Longmuir — bass, backing vocals; Dave Pettigrew — keyboards, backing vocals; Derek Longmuir — drums, percussion	none
Late 1967–summer 1968	Nobby Clark — lead vocals, rhythm guitar; Greg Ellison — lead guitar, backing vocals; Alan Longmuir — bass, backing vocals; Keith Norman — keyboards, backing vocals; Dave Pettigrew — keyboards, backing vocals; Derek Longmuir — drums, percussion	none
Summer 1968–autumn 1969	Nobby Clark — lead vocals, rhythm guitar; Davie Paton — lead guitar, backing vocals; Alan Longmuir — bass, backing vocals; Keith Norman — keyboards, backing vocals; Derek Longmuir — drums, percussion	none
1969	Nobby Clark — lead vocals, rhythm guitar; Davie Paton — lead guitar, backing vocals; Alan Longmuir — bass, backing vocals; Alan Dunn — keyboards, backing vocals; Derek Longmuir — drums, percussion	none
Late 1969–March 1970	Nobby Clark — lead vocals, rhythm guitar; Davie Paton — lead guitar, backing vocals; Alan Longmuir — bass, backing vocals; Billy Lyall — keyboards, backing vocals; Derek Longmuir — drums, percussion	none
March–October 1970	Nobby Clark — lead vocals, rhythm guitar; Davie Paton — lead guitar, backing vocals; Eric Manclark — rhythm guitar, backing vocals; Alan Longmuir — bass, backing vocals; Billy Lyall — keyboards, backing vocals; Derek Longmuir — drums, percussion	none
October 1970–April 1971	Nobby Clark — lead vocals, rhythm guitar; Neil Henderson — lead guitar, backing vocals; Eric Manclark — rhythm guitar, backing vocals; Alan Longmuir — bass, backing vocals; Billy Lyall — keyboards, backing vocals; Derek Longmuir — drums, percussion	none
April 1971–spring 1972	Nobby Clark — lead vocals, rhythm guitar; Neil Henderson — lead guitar, backing vocals; Eric Manclark — rhythm guitar, backing vocals; Alan Longmuir — bass, backing vocals; Archie Marr — keyboards, backing vocals; Derek Longmuir — drums, percussion	"Keep on Dancing" (1971); "We Can Make Music" (1972)
June 1972–November 1973	Nobby Clark — lead vocals, rhythm guitar; Eric Faulkner — lead guitar, backing vocals; John Devine — rhythm guitar, backing vocals; Alan Longmuir — bass, keyboards, backing vocals; Derek Longmuir — drums, percussion	"Mañana" (1972); "Saturday Night" (1973)
November 1973–January 1974	Les McKeown — lead vocals, rhythm guitar; Eric Faulkner — lead guitar, backing vocals; John Devine — rhythm guitar, backing vocals; Alan Longmuir — bass, keyboards, backing vocals; Derek Longmuir — drums, percussion	none
January 1974–April 1976	Les McKeown — lead vocals, rhythm guitar; Eric Faulkner — lead guitar, backing vocals; Stuart Wood — rhythm guitar, backing vocals; Alan Longmuir — bass, keyboards, backing vocals; Derek Longmuir — drums, percussion	Rollin' (1974); "All of Me Loves All of You" (1974); Once Upon a Star (1975); Wouldn't You Like It? (1975); Rock n' Roll Love Letter (1976)
April–November 1976	Les McKeown — lead vocals, rhythm guitar; Eric Faulkner — lead guitar, backing vocals; Ian Mitchell — rhythm guitar, backing vocals; Stuart Wood — bass, keyboards, backing vocals; Derek Longmuir — drums, percussion	Dedication (1976)
November 1976–May 1977	Les McKeown — lead vocals, rhythm guitar; Eric Faulkner — lead guitar, backing vocals; Pat McGlynn — rhythm guitar, backing vocals; Stuart Wood — bass, keyboards, backing vocals; Derek Longmuir — drums, percussion	none
May 1977–early 1978	Les McKeown — lead vocals, rhythm guitar; Eric Faulkner — lead guitar, backing vocals; Stuart Wood — bass, keyboards, backing vocals; Derek Longmuir — drums, percussion	It's a Game (1977); Rollerworld: The Bay City Rollers Live at the Budokan, Tokyo 1977 (2001)
Early–October 1978	Les McKeown — lead vocals, rhythm guitar; Eric Faulkner — lead guitar, backing vocals; Alan Longmuir — rhythm guitar, backing vocals; Stuart Wood — bass, keyboards, backing vocals; Derek Longmuir — drums, percussion	Strangers in the Wind (1978)
November 1978–summer 1981 (as the Rollers)	Duncan Faure — lead vocals, keyboards, guitar; Eric Faulkner — lead guitar, backing vocals; Alan Longmuir — rhythm guitar, backing vocals; Stuart Wood — bass, keyboards, backing vocals; Derek Longmuir — drums, percussion	Elevator (1979); Voxx (1980); Ricochet (1981)
Band inactive autumn 1981–spring 1982
Summer 1982–early 1983	Les McKeown — lead vocals, rhythm guitar; Eric Faulkner — lead guitar, backing vocals; Alan Longmuir — rhythm guitar, backing vocals; Stuart Wood — bass, keyboards, backing vocals; Derek Longmuir — drums, percussion	none
Early 1983–early 1984	Les McKeown — lead vocals, rhythm guitar; Eric Faulkner — lead guitar, backing vocals; Alan Longmuir — rhythm guitar, backing vocals; Ian Mitchell — rhythm guitar, backing vocals; Pat McGlynn — rhythm guitar, backing vocals; Stuart Wood — bass, keyboards, backing vocals; Derek Longmuir — drums, percussion	Live in Japan (1983)
Early 1984–late 1985	Les McKeown — lead vocals, rhythm guitar; Eric Faulkner — lead guitar, backing vocals; Ian Mitchell — rhythm guitar, backing vocals; Pat McGlynn — rhythm guitar, backing vocals; Stuart Wood — bass, keyboards, backing vocals; George Spencer — drums, percussion	Breakout (1985)
Late 1985–early 1987	Les McKeown — lead vocals, rhythm guitar; Ian Mitchell — lead/rhythm guitar, backing vocals; Pat McGlynn — lead/rhythm guitar, backing vocals; Stuart Wood — bass, keyboards, backing vocals; George Spencer – drums, percussion	none
Early–mid 1987 (as the New Rollers)	Eric Faulkner — lead vocals, guitar; Chris Ellen — bass, backing vocals; Kevin Peach — keyboards, backing vocals; Barry Roberts — drums, percussion; Kass Prosser — backing vocals	Bay City Take Two (1987)
June 1987–April 1988 (as the New Rollers)	Eric Faulkner – lead vocals, guitar; Andy Boakes – bass, backing vocals; Kevin Peach – keyboards, backing vocals; Barry Roberts — drums, percussion; Kass Prosser – backing vocals	none
April–August 1988 (as the New Rollers)	Eric Faulkner – lead vocals, guitar; Simon Stewart — guitar, backing vocals; Andy Boakes – bass, backing vocals; Mark Roberts — drums, percussion; Kass Prosser – backing vocals	Party Harty (1988)
August 1988–January 1989 (as the New Rollers)	Eric Faulkner – lead vocals, guitar; Jason Medvec — guitar, backing vocals; Andy Boakes – bass, backing vocals; A. J. Nicholas — keyboards, backing vocals; John Richardson — drums, percussion; Kass Prosser – backing vocals	Life Is a Wasteland (1989)
May–September 1989 (as the New Rollers)	Eric Faulkner – lead vocals, guitar; Jason Medvec — guitar, backing vocals; Simon Stewart — guitar, backing vocals; Andy Boakes – bass, backing vocals; Mark Roberts — drums, percussion; Kass Prosser – backing vocals	none
September–November 1989 (as the New Rollers)	Eric Faulkner – lead vocals, guitar; Jason Medvec — guitar, backing vocals; Stuart Wood — guitar, backing vocals; Andy Boakes – bass, backing vocals; Mark Roberts — drums, percussion; Kass Prosser – backing vocals	none
February 1990–late 1991	Eric Faulkner – lead vocals, lead guitar; Stuart Wood — rhythm guitar, backing vocals; Alan Longmuir — bass, keyboards, backing vocals; Phil Watts — drums, percussion; Kass Prosser — backing vocals	M62 (1991); Bye Bye Baby (1991); Greatest Hits (1992)
Late 1991–February 1992	Eric Faulkner – lead vocals, lead guitar; Stuart Wood — rhythm guitar, backing vocals; Alan Longmuir — guitar, keyboards, backing vocals; Andy Boakes — bass, backing vocals; Phil Watts — drums; Kass Prosser — backing vocals	none
February–fall 1992	Eric Faulkner – lead vocals, lead guitar; Stuart Wood — rhythm guitar, backing vocals; Alan Longmuir — guitar, keyboards, backing vocals; Andy Boakes — bass, backing vocals; Mark Roberts — drums, percussion; Kass Prosser — backing vocals	none
Fall 1992–early 1999	Eric Faulkner – lead vocals, lead guitar; Alan Longmuir — guitar, keyboards, backing vocals; Simon Stewart — rhythm guitar, backing vocals; Stuart Wood — bass, keyboards, backing vocals; Mark Roberts — drums, percussion; Kass Prosser — backing vocals	none
March 1999–January 2000	Les McKeown — lead vocals, rhythm guitar; Eric Faulkner – lead guitar, backing vocals; Alan Longmuir — keyboards, backing vocals; Stuart Wood — bass, keyboards, backing vocals; Dov Skipper — drums	none
Band inactive February 2000–August 2015
September 2015–July 2016	Les McKeown — lead vocals, rhythm guitar; Phil Hendriks — lead guitar; Stuart Wood — rhythm guitar, backing vocals; Alan Longmuir — bass, keyboards, backing vocals; Si Mulvey — bass; Scott McGowan — keyboards; Dave Guest — drums	A Christmas Shang-a-Lang (2015); Live at Barrowland 2015 (2016)
Band inactive August 2016–February 2018
March 2018–2021	Ian Thomson — lead vocals, rhythm guitar; Stuart Wood — lead guitar, backing vocals; Marcus Cordock — bass, backing vocals; Gary O'Hagan — keyboards, backing vocals; Jamie McGrory — drums, percussion	none
2021–March 2022	Ian Thomson — lead vocals, rhythm guitar; Stuart Wood — lead guitar, backing vocals; Marcus Cordock — bass, backing vocals; Steve Morrison — drums, percussion	"Rollin' into Christmas" (2021)
2023–present	Ian Thomson — lead vocals, rhythm guitar; Stuart Wood — lead guitar, backing vocals; Mikey Smith — bass, backing vocals; John McLaughlin — keyboards, backing vocals; Jamie McGrory — drums, percussion	"Brand New Day" (2023); "It's Christmas!" (2023); "Shang-a-Lang 50" (2024); Keep on Rollin' (2024); "Rollers Forever" (2025); "White Christmas" (2025); "Shang-a-Lang Tartan Army" (2026)

== Les McKeown's BCR ==
During his various tenures out of the official Bay City Rollers, vocalist Les McKeown operated a number of bands under similar monikers. He first performed under the BCR name in February 1992, with a band that included fellow alumnus Ian Mitchell on guitar. After facing legal action for his unauthorised use of the name, McKeown renamed his group "Les McKeown's 70's Bay City Rollers", releasing the albums Greatest Hits and Love Letter in 1993, featuring re-recorded versions of classic BCR songs; members on these albums included Mitchell, guitarist Terry Munday, keyboardist Russell Keefe and drummer Terry Chimes. The band was also billed as "Les McKeown's Legendary Bay City Rollers" on a number of occasions. McKeown continued to perform with his own version of the band following the short-lived 1999–2000 reunion, with various incarnations of the group active up until the singer's death in 2021. McKeown's former bandmates continue to perform under the name of the Legendaries.
