= Bay City Rollers discography =

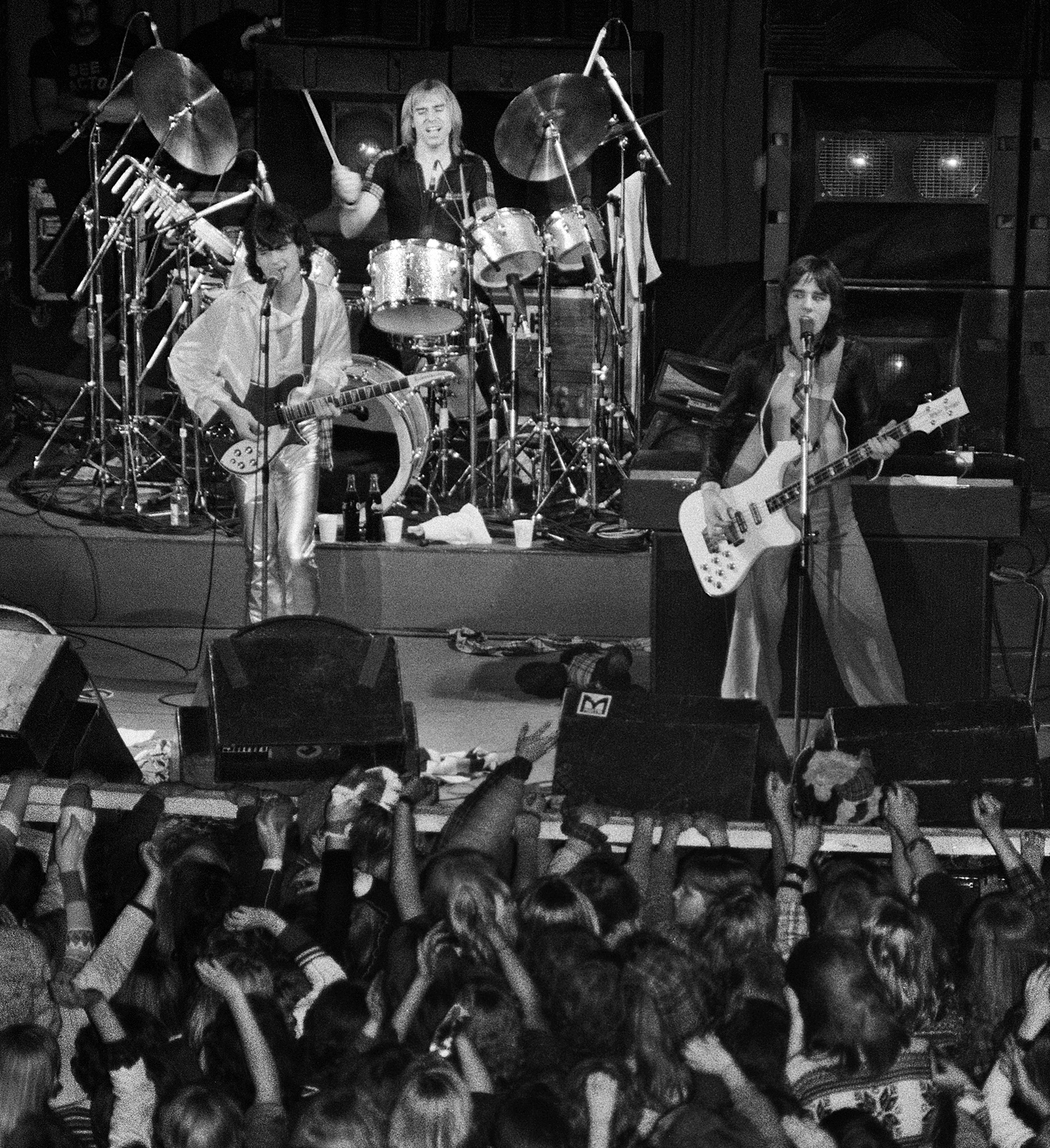
- Bay City Rollers performing live in Helsinki, 1978
- Studio albums: 13
- Live albums: 2
- Compilation albums: 10
- Singles: 31

The discography of Scottish rock band Bay City Rollers consists of thirteen studio albums, ten compilation albums, two live albums and thirty one singles. Originating from Edinburgh, they were "the first of many acts heralded as the 'biggest group since the Beatles' and one of the most screamed-at teeny-bopper acts of the 1970s". They have sold an estimated 120 million records worldwide.

Their debut single was “Keep on Dancing” in 1971 with a different lineup, their debut studio album was Rollin' (1974) and it achieved considerable commercial success internationally, debuting atop the albums charts in the United Kingdom, as well as the top ten in Australia. It also reached the top forty of the albums charts in Canada, Japan and New Zealand, and finished 1975 as the 16th best selling album of the year in the United Kingdom. In May 1975, they released their second album, Once Upon a Star, which continued their commercial success, again topping the albums charts in the United Kingdom and reaching the top ten in Finland and Australia. It spawned the successful single "Bye, Bye Baby" which reached number one on the singles charts in the United Kingdom, Ireland and Australia, and became the best–selling single of 1975 in the United Kingdom. Their first full-length album to be released in the United States and Canada, Bay City Rollers, was released in September 1975, topping the albums charts in Canada and peaking at number twenty on the US Billboard 200.

International commercial success continued for the band through the mid to late 1970s, with subsequent albums Wouldn't You Like It? (1975), Rock n' Roll Love Letter and Dedication (1976) performing well on albums charts. The single "Saturday Night" reached number one in both Canada and the United States, subsequently becoming certified Gold in both countries for sales in excess of 75,000 and 1 million respectively. Their album It's a Game (1977) began a decline commercially for the band, becoming their first album to miss the top ten of the albums charts in the United Kingdom. It peaked at number twenty-three on the US Billboard 200, and was certified Gold by the Recording Industry Association of America (RIAA). Despite a fall in album sales, singles released during this period including "You Made Me Believe in Magic" and "The Way I Feel Tonight" performed strongly, peaking at numbers ten on the US Billboard Hot 100 and thirty-four on the UK Singles Charts, and twenty-four on the US Billboard Hot 100 respectively.

The band failed to match the success of their previous releases with Strangers in the Wind (1978), charting only in Japan where it reached number five, and in Australia and the United States. It spawned the single "Where Will I Be Now" which peaked at number forty-eight in Germany. They continued to record and release new material into the 1980s under the name The Rollers, with subsequent albums Elevator (1979) Voxx (1980) and Ricochet (1981) failing to chart. They returned to a degree of prominence in the 2000s and 2010s with a series of compilation albums, including The Very Best of (2004), which peaked at number eleven in the United Kingdom, number three in their native Scotland and subsequently being certified Gold by the British Phonographic Industry (BPI) in the United Kingdom.

== Albums ==
=== Studio albums ===
Title	Album details	Peak chart positions										Certifications
Title	Album details	UK	AUS	AUT	CAN	GER	JPN	NZ	NOR	SWE	US	Certifications
Rollin'	Released: October 1974; Label: Bell; Format: LP	1	8	—	—	—	37	27	—	—	—	UK: Platinum
Once Upon a Star	Released: May 1975; Label: Bell; Format: LP	1	4	—	—	—	26	30	17	34	—	UK: Platinum
Wouldn't You Like It?	Released: December 1975; Label: Bell; Format: LP	3	3	—	—	30	21	5	9	45	—	UK: Gold
Dedication	Released: September 1976; Label: Arista/Bell; Format: LP	4	3	21	5	5	1	6	—	38	26	UK: Silver; US: Gold
It's a Game	Released: July 1977; Label: Arista; Format: LP	18	10	6	14	4	1	12	—	—	23	US: Gold
Strangers in the Wind	Released: 1978; Label: Arista; Format: LP	—	61	—	—	—	5	—	—	—	129	
Elevator	Released: 1979; Label: Arista; Format: LP; Notes: Released as The Rollers	—	—	—	—	—	—	—	—	—	—	
Voxx	Released: 1980; Label: Arista; Format: LP; Notes: Released as The Rollers	—	—	—	—	—	—	—	—	—	—	
Ricochet	Released: 1981; Label: Epic; Format: LP; Notes: Released as The Rollers	—	—	—	—	—	—	—	—	—	—	
Breakout '85	Released: 1985; Label: Polydor/Powderworks; Format: LP, CD	—	—	—	—	—	—	—	—	—	—	
A Christmas Shang-A-Lang	Released: December 2015; Label: Forrest Boombox; Format: CD, digital download	—	—	—	—	—	—	—	—	—	—	
"—" denotes items that did not chart or were not released in that territory.

=== Compilation albums ===
Title	Album details	Peak chart positions						Certifications
Title	Album details	UK	CAN	GER	JPN	SCO	US	Certifications
Bay City Rollers	Released: 1975; Label: Arista; Format: LP	—	1	—	—	—	20	CAN: Platinum; US: Gold
Souvenirs of Youth	Released: 1975; Label: Arista; Format: LP	—	—	—	29	—	—	
Rock n' Roll Love Letter	Released: 1976; Label: Arista; Format: LP	—	1	—	—	—	31	CAN: Platinum; US: Gold
Rock and Roll Love Letter	Released: 1976; Label: Arista; Format: LP	—	—	—	1	—	—	
Greatest Hits	Released: 1977; Label: Arista; Format: LP	—	92	39	10	—	77	US: Gold
Early Collection	Released: 1978; Label: Arista; Format: LP	—	—	—	3	—	—	
...And Forever	Released: 1982; Label: Arista; Format: LP	—	—	—	—	—	—	
Bay City Rollers: The Definitive Collection	Released: 2000; Label: Arista; Format: CD	—	—	—	—	—	—	
Saturday Night	Released: 2001; Label: BMG Special Products; Format: CD	—	—	—	—	—	—	
The Very Best of	Released: April 2004; Label: Bell; Format: CD, Digital download	11	—	—	—	3	—	UK: Gold
The Greatest Hits	Released: September 2010; Label: Sony Music; Format: CD, digital download	12	—	—	—	2	—	
Gold	Released: 25 October 2019; Label: Crimson; Format: CD, digital download	20	—	—	—	9	—	
"—" denotes items that did not chart or were not released in that territory.

=== Live albums ===
Title	Album details
Live in Japan	Released: 1983; Label: Teichiku
Rollerworld: Live at the Budokan 1977	Released: 2001; Label: Bodyguard Records

== Singles ==
Year	Title	Peak chart positions													Certifications	Album
Year	Title	UK	AUS	AUT	BEL	CAN	GER	IRE	NED	NZ	NOR	SA	JPN	US	Certifications	Album
1971	"Keep on Dancing"	9	—	—	—	—	—	—	—	—	—	—	—	—		Non-album singles
1972	"We Can Make Music"	—	—	—	—	—	—	—	—	—	—	—	—	—		Non-album singles
1972	"Mañana"	—	—	—	—	—	25	—	—	—	—	—	—	—		Non-album singles
1974	"Remember (Sha-La-La-La)"	6	67	—	—	—	37	20	—	—	—	—	—	—	UK: Silver	Rollin'
1974	"Shang-a-Lang"	2	28	—	28	—	41	16	—	—	10	—	—	—	UK: Silver	Rollin'
1974	"Summerlove Sensation"	3	53	—	—	—	—	5	—	—	—	—	—	—	UK: Silver	Rollin'
1974	"All of Me Loves All of You"	4	—	—	—	—	—	5	—	—	—	—	—	—	UK: Silver	Non-album single
1975	"Bye, Bye, Baby"	1	1	13	15	—	10	1	11	32	7	6	38	—	UK: Gold	Once Upon a Star
1975	"Give a Little Love"	1	2	—	—	—	11	1	—	—	4	—	—	—	UK: Gold	Wouldn't You Like It?
1975	"Don't Stop the Music"	—	—	—	—	42	32	—	—	—	—	—	—	—	CAN: Gold	Wouldn't You Like It?
1975	"Love Me Like I Love You"	4	7	—	—	—	15	8	28	18	—	—	45	—		Non-album single
1976	"Saturday Night"	—	45	—	5	1	10	—	2	7	—	16	26	1	CAN: Gold; US: Gold	Bay City Rollers (North America) / Rollin' (UK/Europe)
1976	"Money Honey"	3	3	—	—	1	16	4	—	11	—	—	50	9	UK: Silver; CAN: Gold	Rock n' Roll Love Letter (North America) / Dedication (UK/Europe)
1976	"Rock and Roll Love Letter"	—	9	—	—	6	13	—	—	34	—	—	27	28		Rock n' Roll Love Letter (North America) / Dedication (UK/Europe)
1976	"I Only Want to Be with You"	4	8	17	14	3	9	2	9	12	—	—	28	12	UK: Silver	Dedication (North America) / Non-album single (UK/Europe)
1976	"Yesterday's Hero"	—	—	15	—	22	13	—	—	—	—	—	20	54		Dedication
1976	"Dedication"	—	—	—	—	69	—	—	—	—	—	—	12	60		Dedication
1976	"Don't Worry Baby"	—	34	—	—	—	—	—	—	—	—	—	—	—		Dedication
1977	"It's a Game"	16	9	9	—	—	4	6	—	21	—	—	7	—		It's a Game
1977	"You Made Me Believe in Magic"	34	36	—	—	5	25	—	—	39	—	—	44	10		It's a Game
1977	"The Way I Feel Tonight"	—	56	—	—	23	—	—	—	38	—	—	—	24		It's a Game
1977	"Don't Let the Music Die"	—	—	—	—	—	—	—	—	—	—	—	50	—		It's a Game
1978	"Where Will I Be Now"	—	—	—	—	—	48	—	—	—	—	—	—	—		Strangers in the Wind
1978	"All of the World Is Falling in Love"	—	—	—	—	—	—	—	—	—	—	—	—	—		Strangers in the Wind
1979	"Turn On the Radio"	—	—	—	—	—	—	—	—	—	—	—	—	—		Elevator
1979	"Hello and Welcome Home"	—	—	—	—	—	—	—	—	—	—	—	—	—		Elevator
1980	"God Save Rock & Roll"	—	—	—	—	—	—	—	—	—	—	—	—	—		Voxx
1981	"Life on the Radio"	—	—	—	—	—	—	—	—	—	—	—	—	—		Ricochet
1981	"No Doubt About It"	—	—	—	—	—	—	—	—	—	—	—	—	—		Ricochet
1983	"Piece of the Action"	—	—	—	—	—	—	—	—	—	—	—	—	—		Live in Japan
1985	"When You Find Out"	—	—	—	—	—	—	—	—	—	—	—	—	—		Breakout '85
"—" denotes items that did not chart or were not released in that territory.
