= Strangers in the Wind =

1978 album by Bay City Rollers

Studio album by Bay City Rollers
- Released: 1978
- Recorded: 1978
- Genres: Pop, rock
- Label: Arista
- Producer: Harry Maslin

Bay City Rollers chronology
It's a Game (1977)	Strangers in the Wind (1978)	Elevator (1979)

Professional ratings
Review scores
Source	Rating
AllMusic	3/5 stars
Billboard	not rated link

Strangers in the Wind is a 1978 rock album by the Bay City Rollers. It was the group's sixth original studio album, and second consecutive disc to feature the production work of Harry Maslin, who produced hits for Air Supply.

== Background ==
Early 1978 had seen the Rollers' most successful line-up as bassist Alan Longmuir, a founding member, re-joined the band after a two-year hiatus, now on rhythm guitar. The group timed the release of their new album to coincide with their very own network television series, The Krofft Superstar Hour Starring the Bay City Rollers, a Saturday morning NBC show. Unfortunately, the kiddie format did little to push record sales for the Rollers, who were over two years removed from their phenomenon stage. The lush, mature soft-rock of Strangers in the Wind did not find an audience, and each of three singles failed to hit the U.S. charts. The most successful single from the album, "Where Will I Be Now," was a minor hit in Germany.

The band hired Duncan Faure to replace Les McKeown, after trying it as a 4-piece band with no success, for 1979's Elevator. With Faure as front man, the band continued on making two more albums, Voxx and Ricochet.

Strangers in the Wind was reissued on CD with a bonus track in October 2007 ("All of the World Is Falling in Love" (single version)).

== Track listing ==
All tracks are written by Eric Faulkner and Stuart "Woody" Wood except where noted

=== Side one ===
1. "Another Rainy Day in New York City"
2. "All of the World Is Falling in Love"
3. "Where Will I Be Now" (Chris East)
4. "Back on the Street"
5. "Strangers in the Wind"

=== Side two ===
1. "Love Brought Me Such a Magical Thing" (Barry Kirsch, Charlie Spencer)
2. "If You Were My Woman"
3. "Every Tear I Cry" (Iain Sutherland)
4. "Shoorah Shoorah for Hollywood"
5. "When I Say I Love You (The Pie)" (Iain Sutherland)

== Charts ==
Chart (1978)	Peak position
Australian Albums (Kent Music Report)	61
Japanese Albums (Oricon)	5
US Billboard 200	129

== Personnel ==
=== Group members ===
- Les McKeown – lead and harmony vocals
- Eric Faulkner – lead and acoustic guitars, harmony vocals, vocoder, Roland guitar synthesizer; lead vocals on "Back on the Street"
- Alan Longmuir – rhythm and acoustic guitars, harmony vocals, synthesizer
- Stuart "Woody" Wood – bass, harmony vocals, saxophone; lead vocals on "Love Brought Me Such a Magical Thing"
- Derek Longmuir – drums, syn-drums, percussion

=== Other personnel ===
- Harry Maslin – producer
- David Richards – engineer
- Martin Pearson – assistant engineer
- Barry Fasman – strings and brass arrangements
- Richard Belis – vocal arrangements
- Nicky Hopkins – keyboards
- Neal Preston – photography
- Bob Iwanicki – sleeve illustrator

== Other information ==
- Recorded at Mountain Studios, Montreux, Switzerland
- Given its first wide CD release in 2008 on the 7Ts label
