= Elevator (The Rollers album) =

1979 album by Bay City Rollers

Studio album by The Rollers
- Released: 1979
- Recorded: 1979
- Genre: Power pop, pop, rock
- Label: Arista
- Producer: Peter Ker

The Rollers chronology
| Strangers in the Wind (1978) | Elevator (1979) | Voxx (1980) |

Elevator is a 1979 rock album by the Bay City Rollers. Having replaced longtime lead singer Les McKeown with Duncan Faure, the group shortened their name to simply The Rollers, and pursued a more rocking, power-pop sound than their previous work.

The album, released by Arista, was critically acclaimed but poorly received commercially. Neither the album itself or any single released hit the charts.

The album was reissued on CD in 2008.

== Critical reception ==
Professional ratings
Review scores
| Source | Rating |
|---|---|
| AllMusic | 4/5 stars |
| Billboard | link |

AllMusic gave the album four stars out of five. Dave Thompson of AllMusic wrote that the album featured a hard rock, AOR direction. Billboard felt the music was reminiscent of 1965-66 era Beatles, with Trouser Press comparing the album to the Beatles' Rubber Soul (1965).

== Track listing ==
=== Side one ===
1. "Stoned Houses #1" (Faulkner, Wood, Faure)
2. "Elevator" (Faulkner, Faure, Wood)
3. "Playing in a Rock and Roll Band" (Faure, Tom Seufurt)
4. "Hello & Welcome Home" (Faure)
5. "I Was Eleven" (Faure)
6. "Stoned Houses #2" (Faulkner)

=== Side two ===
1. "Turn on the Radio" (Faulkner, Faure)
2. "Instant Relay" (Faulkner)
3. "Tomorrow's Just a Day Away" (Faulkner, Wood)
4. "Who'll Be My Keeper" (Faure)
5. "Back on the Road Again" (Faulkner, Faure, Wood, Alan Longmuir)
6. "Washington's Birthday" (Faulkner, Faure)

== Personnel ==
=== Group members ===
- Eric Faulkner – guitar, acoustic guitar, backing vocals, lead vocals on "Playing in a Rock & Roll Band"
- Duncan Faure – lead vocals, piano, moog, guitar
- Alan Longmuir – guitar, bass, backing vocals, string machine
- Derek Longmuir – drums, percussion
- Stuart "Woody" Wood – bass, piano, moog, string machine, clavinet, backing vocals, lead vocals on "Tomorrow's Just A Day Away"

=== Other personnel ===
- Peter Ker – producer
- Rod Thear – engineer
- Gary Gray – mixing engineer
- John Naslen – mixing engineer
