= Dedication (Bay City Rollers album) =

1976 studio album by Bay City Rollers

Studio album by Bay City Rollers
- Released: September 1976
- Recorded: 1976
- Genres: Pop rock, power pop
- Labels: Arista, Bell
- Producer: Jimmy Ienner

Bay City Rollers chronology
Rock N'Roll Love Letter (1976)	Dedication (1976)	It's a Game (1977)

Professional ratings
Review scores
Source	Rating
AllMusic	link

Dedication is an album by the Scottish band Bay City Rollers, released in September 1976. It was the band's fourth original studio album, and the first new album to be released in the wake of their enormous worldwide success of early 1976. Its release was supported by a number of singles, most notably "Yesterday's Hero", "Money Honey", "Rock and Roll Love Letter" and their cover version of the Dusty Springfield song "I Only Want to Be with You" which featured only on the North American release.

== Background ==
Founding group member Alan Longmuir had been replaced by Ian Mitchell prior to the recording sessions. With Mitchell being assigned as rhythm guitarist, Stuart Wood moved from rhythm guitar to bass. Mitchell also provided the lead vocals for the title track. However, when he left the band later that year, a version of "Dedication" featuring vocals by Les McKeown was included on subsequent pressings of the LP and was also released as a single.

The album as released in the United Kingdom was noted for omitting "I Only Want to Be with You", at that time the band's internationally successful single, from its track listing. Instead, it featured "Money Honey", which served as the album's lead single in the UK; this track had previously been featured on the North America–only release Rock n' Roll Love Letter (1976).

== Release ==
The album was supported by a total of seven singles: five released internationally and two released exclusively in North America. "Yesterday's Hero", "Dedication", "Money Honey", "Rock and Roll Love Letter" and a cover of "Don't Worry Baby" by the Beach Boys were released internationally as singles, while their cover of "I Only Want to Be with You" was released exclusively in the United States from the album. Elsewhere, "I Only Want to Be with You" was released as a non-album single. Upon its release Dedication peaked at number four on the UK Albums Chart, but sales were lower than expected in the territory, selling fewer than 100,000 copies. The album fared better in the United States where it peaked at number 26 on the US Billboard 200 albums chart, selling in excess of 500,000 copies. The release of the album is considered by Simon Spence as the beginning of a commercial decline for the band.

To promote the release of the album, the Bay City Rollers embarked on a worldwide tour that grossed $2 million, which included sales from merchandise. The album was subsequently certified silver by the British Phonographic Industry (BPI) and gold by the Recording Industry Association of America (RIAA).

== Track listing ==
=== UK edition ===
1. "Let's Pretend" (Eric Carmen)
2. "You're a Woman" (Eric Faulkner, Stuart Wood)
3. "Rock 'N Roller" (Faulkner, Wood)
4. "Don't Worry Baby" (Brian Wilson, Roger Christian)
5. "Yesterday's Hero" (Harry Vanda, George Young)
6. "My Lisa" (Tony Sciuto, Sammy Egorin)
7. "Money Honey" (Faulkner, Wood)
8. "Rock 'N Roll Love Letter" (Tim Moore)
9. "Write a Letter" (Wood, Les McKeown, Ian Mitchell)
10. "Dedication" (Guy Fletcher, Doug Flett)

=== US edition ===
1. "Let's Pretend" (Carmen) – 3:31
2. "You're a Woman" (Faulkner, Wood) – 4:15
3. "Rock 'N Roller" (Faulkner, Wood) – 3:30
4. "I Only Want to Be with You" (Mike Hawker, Ivor Raymonde) – 3:27
5. "Yesterday's Hero" (Vanda, Young) – 4:33
6. "My Lisa" (Scutio, Egorin) – 3:35
7. "Don't Worry Baby" (Wilson, Christian) – 3:03
8. "Are You Cuckoo?" (Russ Ballard) – 4:05
9. "Write a Letter" (Wood, McKeown, Mitchell) – 3:47
10. "Dedication" (Fletcher, Flett) – 3:54

== Personnel ==
- Les McKeown – lead and backing vocals
- Eric Faulkner – lead guitar, backing vocals; co-lead vocals on "Rock 'N Roller"
- Ian Mitchell – rhythm guitar, backing vocals; lead vocals on "Dedication"
- Stuart "Woody" Wood – bass, backing vocals; co-lead vocals on "Rock 'N Roller"
- Derek Longmuir – drums, percussion, backing vocals

== Charts ==
=== Weekly charts ===
Chart (1976)	Peak position
Australian Albums (Kent Music Report)	3
Austrian Albums (Ö3 Austria)	21
Canadian Albums (RPM)	5
Finnish Albums (Suomen virallinen lista)	3
German Albums (Offizielle Top 100)	5
Japanese Albums (Oricon)	1
New Zealand Albums (RIANZ)	6
Swedish Albums (Sverigetopplistan)	38
Swiss Albums (Schweizer Hitparade)	5
UK Albums (Official Charts)	4
US Billboard 200	26
Zimbabwean Albums (ZIMA)	13

=== Year-end charts ===
Chart (1977)	Position
German Albums (Offizielle Top 100)	9

== Certifications ==
Region	Certification	Certified units/sales
United Kingdom (BPI)	Silver	60,000^{^}
United States (RIAA)	Gold	500,000^{^}
^{^} Shipments figures based on certification alone.
