= Ricochet (Bay City Rollers album) =

1981 studio album by The Rollers

Studio album by The Rollers
- Released: 1981
- Genre: Rock, power pop
- Label: Epic
- Producer: The Rollers, Stephan Galfas

The Rollers chronology
Voxx (1980)	Ricochet (1981)	Live in Japan (1983)

Professional ratings
Review scores
Source	Rating
AllMusic	4/5 stars

Ricochet is a 1981 album by the Bay City Rollers, credited as The Rollers. The album was the third and final release under this band name. In Canada, it saw release on Epic Records as "The Brown Bag Album" and later appeared with a promotional sticker which said, "The Famous Brownbag Album Now Exposed!"

Ricochet was reissued on CD in 2008 with one bonus cut – "Life on the Radio (single version)".

== Track listing ==
Side one
No.	Title	Writer(s)	Lead vocals	Length
1.	"Doors, Bars, Metal"	Faure	Faure	3:43
2.	"Life on the Radio"	Faulkner	Faure	4:40
3.	"No Doubt About It"	Faulkner	Faure	3:57
4.	"Roxy Lady"	Faulkner	Faulkner	3:28
5.	"Ricochet"	Faure	(instrumental)	2:26
6.	"Won't You Come Home With Me"	Faure	Faure	3:11

Side two
No.	Title	Writer(s)	Lead vocals	Length
1.	"Ride"	Faure	Faure	4:09
2.	"Lay Your Love on the Line"	Faulkner, Faure, Wood	Faure	3:51
3.	"That's Where the Boys Are"	Faulkner	Faulkner	3:26
4.	"Set the Fashion"	Faure, Wood	Faure	3:29
5.	"This Is Your Life"	Faulkner, Faure, Longmuir, Wood	Faure	3:33

== Personnel ==
- Eric Faulkner – lead guitar, backing and lead vocals
- Duncan Faure – lead and backing vocals, rhythm guitar
- Alan Longmuir – guitar, bass, keyboards
- Derek Longmuir – drums, percussion
- Stuart "Woody" Wood – bass guitar, backing vocals
- Stephan Galfas – producer
- Judd Lander – bagpipes, harmonica
- Pat Bianco – saxophone
