= Voxx (album) =

1980 rock album by The Rollers

Studio album by The Rollers
- Released: 1980
- Recorded: 1977–1980
- Genre: Pop, rock
- Label: Arista
- Producer: Peter Ker, Ricky Fender

The Rollers chronology
Elevator (1979)	Voxx (1980)	Ricochet (1981)

Professional ratings
Review scores
Source	Rating
Allmusic	3.5/5 stars

Voxx is a 1980 rock album by the Bay City Rollers. It was the second of three LPs the group issued as The Rollers.

The disc featured an unlikely hodgepodge of songs culled from various sources. Two tracks ("Soho" and "The Hero") were unused tunes from the Elevator sessions, another two ("Honey Don't Leave L.A." and "New York") were re-recordings of Duncan Faure solo tracks, and "Working for the People" was a redo of a Rabbitt song. "Rebel Rebel" is presented in a live version, lifted from the 1977 Budokan concert that would be released in 2001 as Rollerworld. Production was credited to "Ricky Fender", an alias of Eric Faulkner, with Peter Ker credited for the two Elevator tracks.

Voxx was the Rollers' final LP for Arista Records, and was released only in Germany and Japan. A CD edition has been issued in Japan and in the UK.

== Track listing ==
1. "God Save Rock and Roll" (Faulkner, Faure)
2. "Working for the People" (Faure, Rabbitt)
3. "Soho" (Faulkner)
4. "The Hero" (Faulkner)
5. "'85" (Faulkner)
6. "Honey Don't Leave L.A." (Faure)
7. "New York" (Faure)
8. "The Jig" (Traditional; arranged by The Rollers)
9. "Only the Young Die Old" (Faulkner)
10. "Rebel Rebel" (David Bowie)

== Personnel ==
=== Group members ===
- Eric Faulkner – guitar, backing vocals, lead vocals on "Rebel Rebel"
- Duncan Faure – lead vocals, piano, moog, guitar
- Alan Longmuir – guitar, bass, keyboards, backing vocals
- Derek Longmuir – drums, percussion
- Stuart "Woody" Wood - bass, keyboards, backing vocals

=== Other personnel ===
- Peter Kerr – producer
- Ricky Fender – producer except The Hero and Soho
