= Duncan Faure =

South African singer (born 1956)

- Born: 16 December 1956 (age 69); Pretoria, South Africa
- Genre: Rock
- Instruments: Vocals; keyboards; guitar
- Years active: 1972–present
- Formerly of: Rabbitt; Bay City Rollers

Duncan Faure (born 16 December 1956) is a South African singer and musician. He was in Rabbitt (1972–1978) and the Bay City Rollers (1978–1982). He later pursued a solo career in the U.S., contributing to the Who's That Girl soundtrack. He continues to release music as of 2023.

== Career ==
From 1972 to 1978, Faure a member of the South African based group Rabbitt, and performed on all of the groups albums. The same year Rabbitt split up (1978), Faure joined Bay City Rollers, replacing lead singer Les McKeown. With Faure, the line-up produced three albums: Elevator (1979), Voxx (1980) and Ricochet (1981). Faure left the Rollers after the release of Ricochet. Faure moved to the United States to continue work as a recording artist. Faure appears on the 1987 soundtrack Who's That Girl, to which he sang "24 Hours". Faure is still active today, releasing solo albums and singles as of 2023.

== Discography ==
=== Rabbitt ===
Albums

- Boys Will Be Boys! (1975)
- A Croak and a grunt in the Night (1977)
- Rock Rabbitt (1977)

=== Bay City Rollers ===
Albums

- Elevator (1979)
- Voxx (1980)
- Ricochet (1981)

Singles

- Turn on the Radio (1979)
- Hello and Welcome Home (1979)
- God Save Rock and Roll (1980)
- Life on the Radio (1981)
- No Doubt About It (1981)

=== Solo ===
Albums

- Who's That Girl (1987)
