= Eric Faulkner =

Scottish Guitarist, Singer/Songwriter

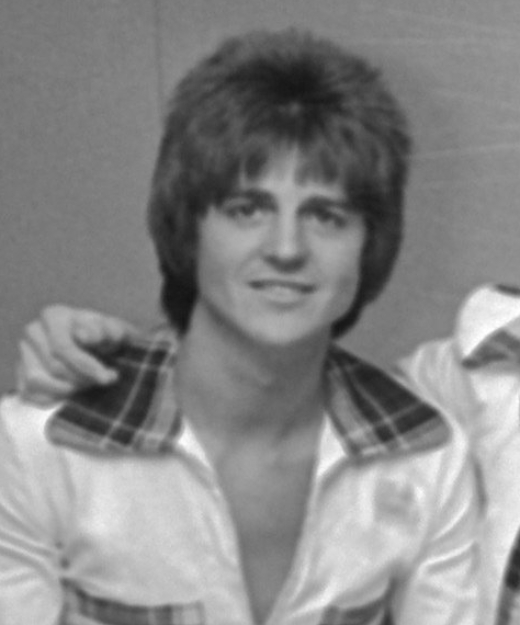
- Faulkner in 1976

Background information
- Also known as: Eric Faulkner
- Born: Eric Falconer; 21 October 1953 (age 72); Western General Hospital, Edinburgh, Scotland
- Occupations: Singer; songwriter; guitarist
- Instruments: Vocals; guitar; viola; violin; mandolin; bass; keyboards
- Years active: 1972–present
- Formerly of: Bay City Rollers
- Website: ericfaulkner.co.uk

Eric Faulkner (born 21 October 1953 as Eric Falconer) is a guitarist, songwriter and singer, best known as a member of the Scottish pop band the Bay City Rollers.

== Early life ==
Faulkner was born at the Western General Hospital, Edinburgh, Scotland. As a child, he learned to play the viola and joined the Edinburgh Youth Orchestra where he played in a performance for Queen Elizabeth The Queen Mother, in Leith Town Hall. His father, George, was a shop steward and Scottish Trades Union Congress delegate, and member of the CPGB (Communist Party of Great Britain).

At thirteen years old Faulkner formed his first high school band, The Witness (which later became Sugar and then KIP). His early years are covered in the first part of his autobiography, An Edinburgh Lad.

== Bay City Rollers ==
In 1972 Faulkner joined The Bay City Rollers. The original Rollers, Nobby Clark, Alan and Derek Longmuir had secured a record deal with the UK record label, Bell Records. Until the end of 1973 the band's line up was Nobby Clark, Alan and Derek Longmuir, Devine and Faulkner. During that time the band worked with the production team of Ken Howard and Alan Blaikley, producers of hits for Peter Frampton's earlier band "The Herd" and Dave Dee, Dozy, Beaky, Mick & Titch. Their first production for the band was the song "Mañana". Winning The Radio Luxembourg Grand Prix song contest, this song gave the band their first European hit.

Radio Luxembourg gave the song their seal of approval, nominating it for their Power Play which had the song being played on the hour, every hour. This, along with the band's vociferous teenage girl fans at live gigs, catapulted "Remember", without any mainland UK airplay, straight into the charts on its first week of release.

Their first song was a cover of "Keep On Dancing", which went to number 9 in the UK.

Along with Stuart Wood, Faulkner took over songwriting for the Bay City Rollers. Their first self-penned hit was "Money Honey".

Although "Mañana" made no impact on the UK charts, the next single, "Saturday Night" (produced by Phil Coulter and Bill Martin), peaked at No 51 in the UK charts. The band continued to tour in the UK, attracting an increasingly enthusiastic fan following. Clark left the band in late 1973 after disputes with the group's manager, Tam Paton. "Saturday Night" was re-voiced by the group's new lead singer, 17 year-old Les McKeown. In 1975, "Saturday Night" would be a no. 1 in the US.

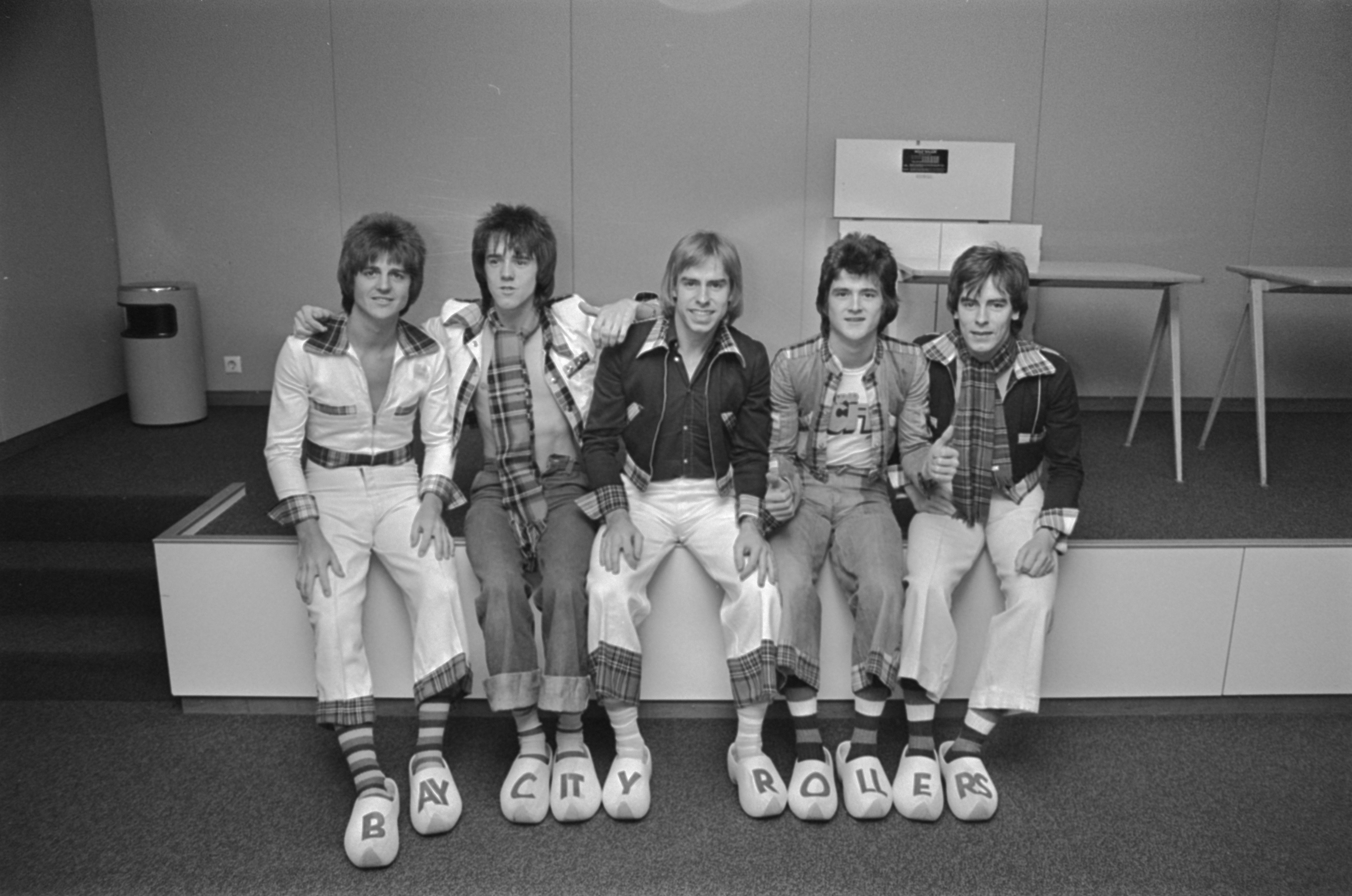
Bay City Rollers, 1976

The band broke through the UK charts in early 1974 with the song "Remember" (also produced by Coulter and Martin). In the UK during the 1970s, the Bay City Rollers went number one twice, and had six records certified silver and two certified gold.

In the late 1980s, Faulkner formed his own version of Bay City Rollers called "The New Rollers". The band was Faulkner on lead vocals, Karen Prosser on vocals, Jason Medvec on guitar, Andy Boakes on bass, and Mark Roberts on drums. They band toured extensively throughout the US, Canada, UK and Australia. This group released an independent four-song EP titled Party Harty and released one single in 1988. In 1990, Alan Longmuir and Stuart Wood joined Faulkner for a tour.

Faulkner returned for BCR reunions in 1990, 1996, and 1999–2000.

== Later works ==
As well as guitar, Faulkner also plays viola, violin, mandolin, bass and keyboards.

Sharing his family's left-wing views, he has played many Trade Union benefit shows.

Faulkner released the book An Edinburgh Lad, a mixture of autobiographical moments of his life and poetry.

Throughout the 2000s, Wood and several other members of the band were in court trying to receive unpaid royalties.

In 2006 Faulkner sat in for Jake Burns in Pauline Black's Three Men and Black for an Arts Centre tour. On Burns' return, Faulkner continued the working relationship as support on their tours.

In 2007, Faulkner continued as a solo artist and appeared at the Glastonbury Festival as a protest singer in support of British politician Tony Benn. It was arranged for him to end his performance by introducing Tony Benn on the Left Field stage under the banner "Another World is Possible".

In July 2018, Faulkner returned to the stage, with performances at the Heart of Hawick Music Festival in August.

He has released a few solo albums, including In the Shade.

== Personal life ==
In February 2015, Faulkner contracted viral encephalitis which almost killed him. Although his initial recovery seemed rapid, he was left with post encephalitic syndrome. He has since shown support for encephalitis-related charities. During his recovery, in 2017, he wrote and recorded new music.

While on tour in the 1970s, Faulkner tried to commit suicide by overdosing.

== Bibliography ==
- Irwin Stambler, Encyclopedia of Pop, Rock & Soul. 1974. St. Martin's Press, Inc. New York, N.Y. ISBN 0-312-02573-4
