= Derek Longmuir =

Scottish musician (born 1951)

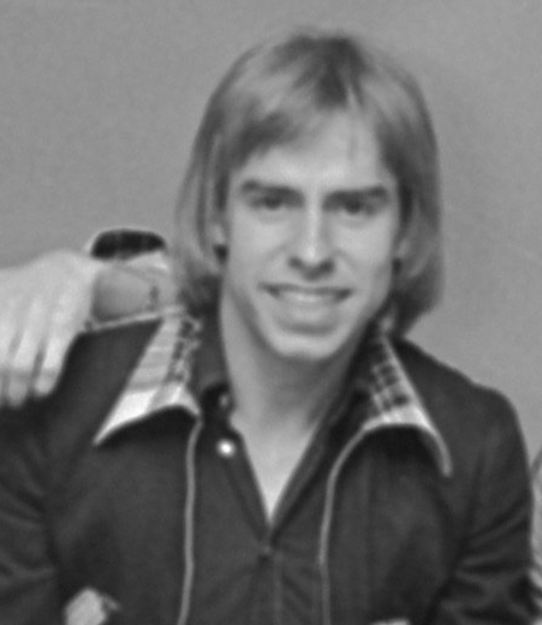
- Longmuir in 1976

Background information
- Born: 19 March 1951 (age 75); Edinburgh, Scotland
- Genres: Rock; pop
- Occupations: Drummer; nurse
- Instrument: Drums
- Years active: 1964–1983
- Formerly of: Bay City Rollers

Derek Longmuir (born 19 March 1951) is a Scottish former drummer and a founding member of the pop group Bay City Rollers. His elder brother Alan Longmuir played bass guitar in the group.

== Career ==
Longmuir formed his first band at age 13 in 1964, with his brother Alan. Their name eventually changed to Bay City Rollers after throwing a dart at a map of the United States and the dart landing near Bay City, Michigan. After signing to a record company in 1971, the Rollers would become one of the biggest acts of the 1970s.

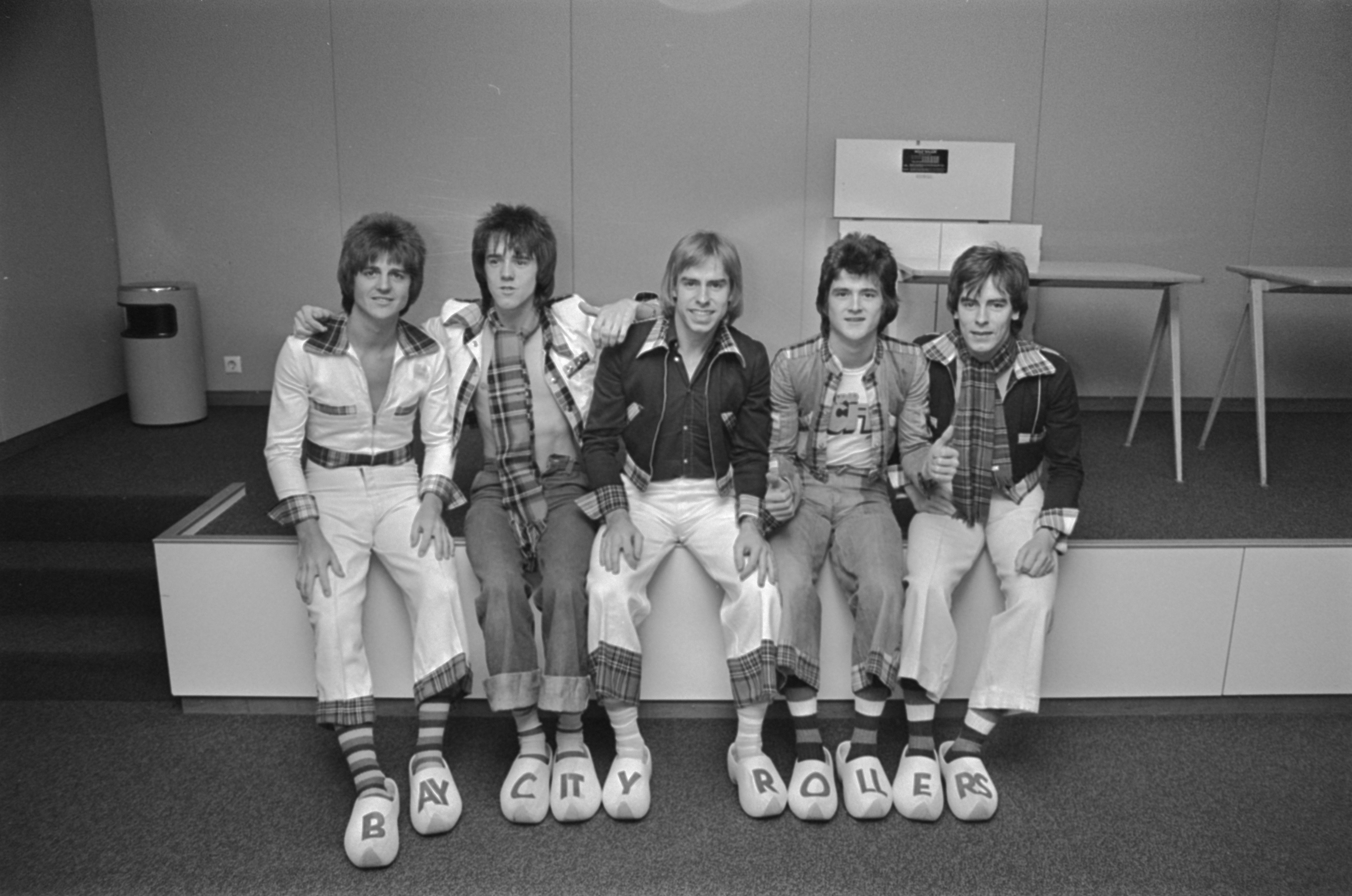
Bay City Rollers, 1976

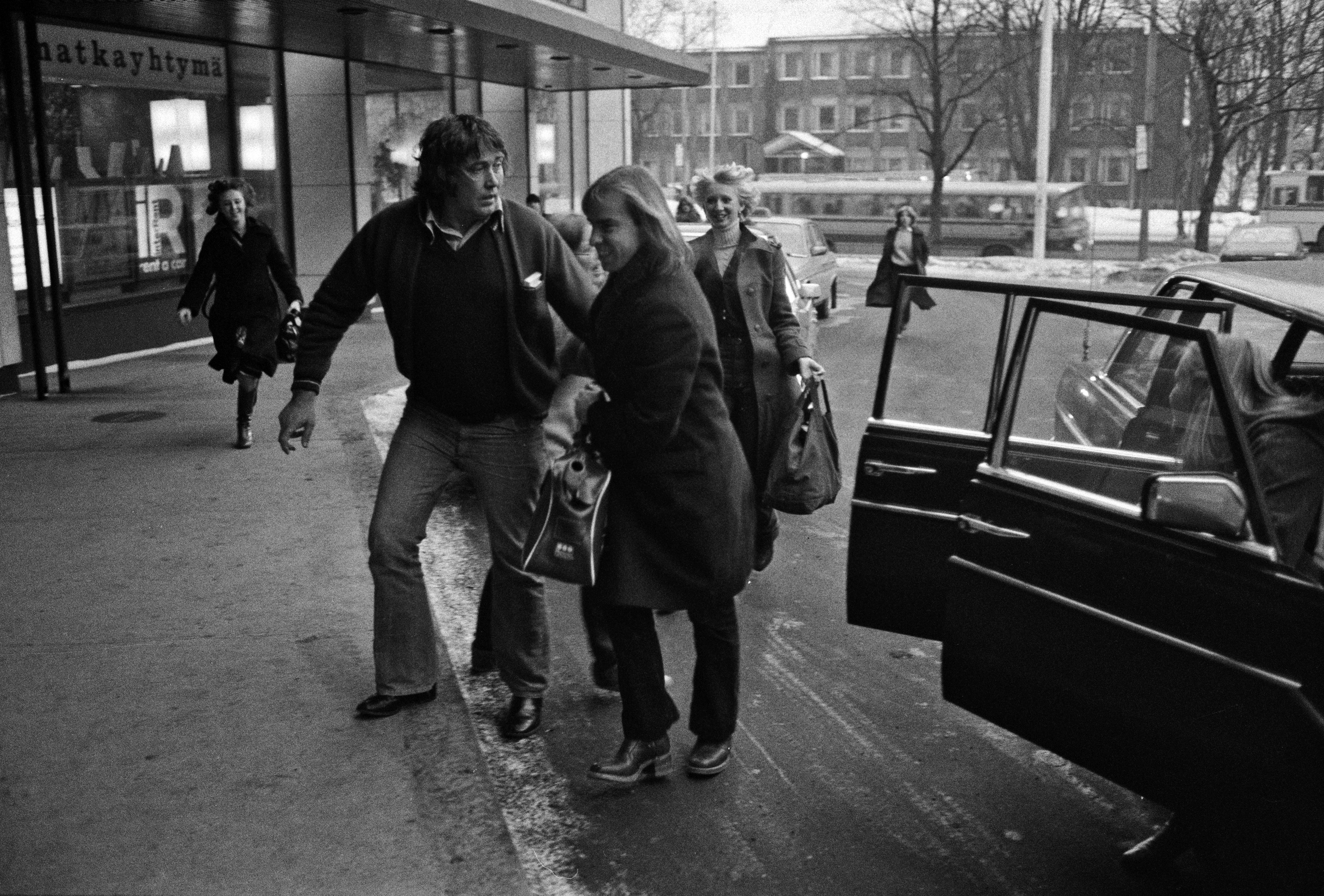
Longmuir being Chauffeured into a hospital in Helsinki, Finland

In the UK during the 1970s, the Bay City Rollers went number one twice, and had 6 records certified silver and 2 certified gold. He appeared on each of the band's nine studio albums through to 1981. Longmuir made the decision to leave the Bay City Rollers in 1982 while the band were on tour in Japan; by 1983 he had done so.

== Personal life ==
Derek Longmuir was born on 19 March 1951 to Duncan and Georgina Longmuir. His father, Duncan was an undertaker. Longmuir and his older brother Alan both went to Tynecastle High School, and left school at age fifteen in 1966. He had two sisters, Betty and Alice.

Longmuir retired from the music industry in the early 1980s and trained as a nurse working at Edinburgh Royal Infirmary in 1993. He would regularly volunteer at children's hospitals. Longmuir had spent some time working in Portugal with the red cross; when his brother Alan suffered a heart attack in 1995, Longmuir was one of the nurses who helped him recover.

In 1991, Longmuir was in a relationship with Janice Green, who was also the person to convince him to take nursing as a profession.

Throughout the 2000s, Longmuir and several other members of the band were in court trying to receive unpaid royalties.

== Arrest ==
In 2000, Longmuir was sentenced to 300 hours of community service after admitting to possessing child pornography. Despite his guilty plea, he maintained that the offending materials did not belong to him but were left behind by an acquaintance. Longmuir said he pleaded guilty in hope of avoiding a "media circus". Despite his conviction and initially being suspended from working as a nurse, the conduct committee of the United Kingdom Central Council for Nursing, Midwifery and Health Visiting (UKCC) decided to give him a caution and allowed him to continue working as a nurse.

In an interview in the Sunday Herald on 7 May 2000, Longmuir's foster son, Jorge Loureiro, said that Longmuir was innocent and had been framed by an obsessed American fan he had befriended, with discs having been sent to his home anonymously days before he was arrested.

As a result of the arrest, Longmuir was absent from reunion concerts featuring Les McKeown, Alan Longmuir and Stuart Wood.

== Bibliography ==
- Stambler, Irwin, Encyclopedia of Pop, Rock & Soul. 1974. St. Martin's Press, Inc., New York, N.Y. ISBN 0-312-25025-8.
