= Stuart Wood (musician) =

Scottish musician, songwriter and producer

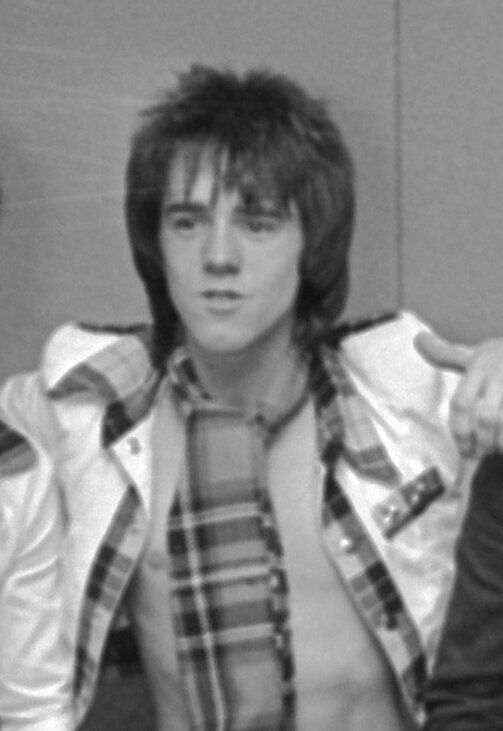
- Wood with the Bay City Rollers in 1976.

Background information
- Also known as: "Woody"
- Born: Stuart John Wood; 25 February 1957 (age 69); Edinburgh, Scotland
- Genres: Rock; pop rock; Celtic
- Occupations: Musician; songwriter
- Instruments: Guitar; keyboards; bass; vocals
- Years active: 1970–present
- Member of: Bay City Rollers

Stuart John "Woody" Wood (born 25 February 1957) is a Scottish musician, songwriter and producer. Wood is best known as the guitarist for the 1970s band the Bay City Rollers since joining in 1974. Since 1996, Wood has released over 50 records of Celtic music on his own label.

== Early life ==
Stuart John Wood was born and raised in Edinburgh. He grew up listening to jazz and classical such as Louis Armstrong and Glenn Miller, and wasn't interested in pop music until he was 14–15 when his friend asked him to play guitar in a pop band he was forming in school. He attended St Andrew's School, now St Augustine's High School.

== Career ==
Wood's professional career began in 1974, aged 17, when he joined The Bay City Rollers.

In the UK during the 1970s, the Bay City Rollers went number one twice, and had 6 records Certified silver and 2 Certified gold.

Wood played rhythm guitar until 1976, when bassist Alan Longmuir left the band and was replaced by Ian Mitchell, then Wood moved to bass guitar.

In 1982, Wood, Les McKeown, Alan and Derek Longmuir, Ian Mitchell and Pat McGlynn reunited for a tour of Japan that lasted until the next year.

Since 1996, Wood has released over 50 records of Celtic music on his own label. Solo studio albums are: In Different Skies, Attic Archives, Slide, Sky Light, and Stay Safe (An Instrumental Journey Through Lockdown).

Throughout the 2000s, Wood and several other members of the band were in court trying to receive unpaid royalties.

When the band reformed for a reunion tour in 2015, Wood announced in 2016 that he had withdrawn due to disputes with Les McKeown. Wood posted to social media: "Hi all... just to say TITP (T In The Park, Scottish festival) is my last gig. Disappointed is an understatement but out of my control."

In 2003, Wood and other musicians opened "The Music Kitchen".

In 2019, after his bandmate's death, Les McKeown accused Wood of "exaggerating" his friendship with Alan Longmuir to promote Wood's own shows.

Wood remains active with the Bay City Rollers and released their new single "Keep On Rollin" August 2024 with a new album to follow. Wood is the only original member of Bay City Rollers in the current lineup.

== Personal life ==
Wood lived in South Africa for a few years after the Bay City Rollers stopped touring. Wood lives in Edinburgh, Scotland, where he was also born and raised, with his wife Denise. He taught Music Technology at a local college. In 2019, while on holiday in East Lothian, he rescued a ten-year old Labrador that went missing in North Berwick two days before. He had found the dog in a rough area of town covered with broken bottles, and discovered the dog obscured in a manhole.

In April 2020, Wood's father died from Coronavirus.
