= Alan Longmuir =

Scottish musician (1948–2018)

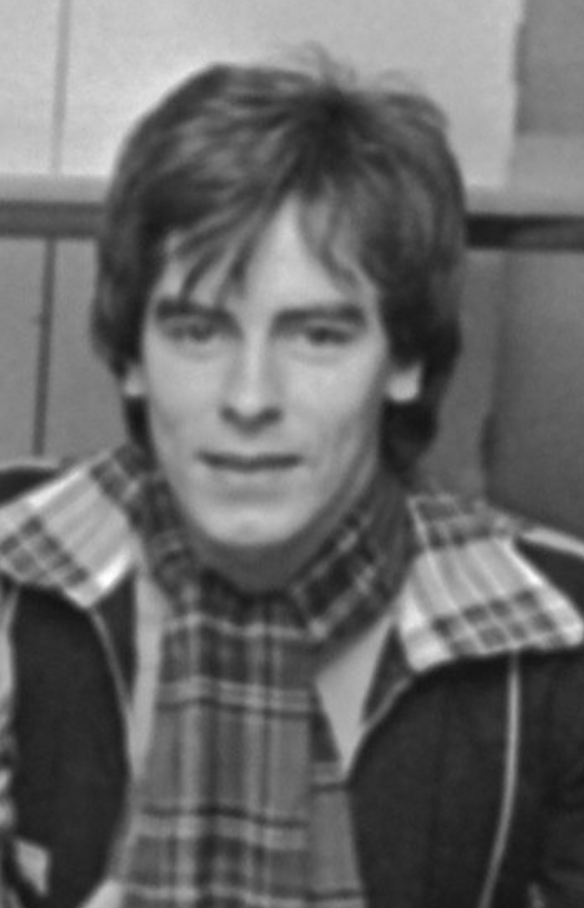
- Longmuir in 1976

Background information
- Born: Alan Longmuir; 20 June 1948; Edinburgh, Scotland
- Died: 2 July 2018 (aged 70) Larbert, Falkirk, Scotland
- Genres: Rock; pop rock
- Occupation: Musician
- Instruments: Bass; guitar; keyboards
- Years active: 1964–2018
- Formerly of: Bay City Rollers

Alan Longmuir (20 June 1948 – 2 July 2018) was a Scottish musician and a founding member of the pop group the Bay City Rollers. He played the bass guitar, whilst his younger brother Derek Longmuir was drummer.

== Early life ==
Longmuir was born at Simpson Memorial Maternity Pavilion Hospital, Edinburgh to Duncan and Georgina Longmuir. His father, Duncan was an undertaker. Alan and his younger brother Derek Longmuir both went to Tynecastle High School, and Alan left the school in 1963. He had two sisters, Betty and Alice.

Until their career took off, he worked as a plumber, but had spent a year in office work after leaving school.

== Career ==
A member of a musical family, he formed his first band at the age of 17, with his brother Derek and two others. They changed their name and line-up to become the Bay City Rollers.

In 1976, at the height of the band's popularity, Alan Longmuir was growing tired and stressed, and was subsequently kicked out of the group by their manager for being "too old and too hard to control". Longmuir was replaced by rhythm guitarist Ian Mitchell, who was ten years his junior. Tam Paton, then the group's manager, alleged that Longmuir had tried to commit suicide. Paton's own conduct was later revealed as a contributory factor in the unhappiness of some band members. Mitchell himself made way for Pat McGlynn in December 1976.

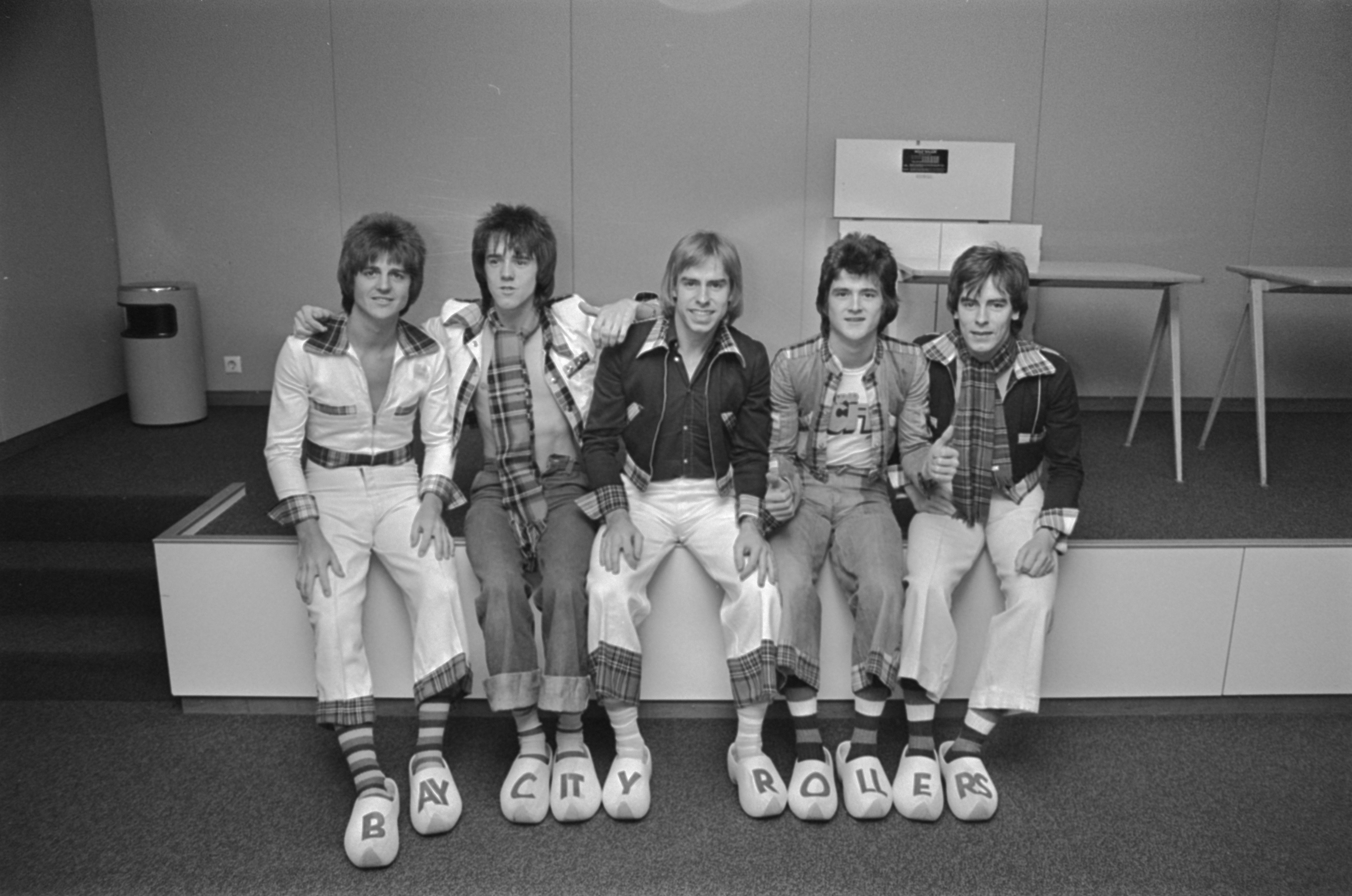
Bay City Rollers, 1976

Longmuir returned to the group in 1978 following McGlynn's departure, and thereafter switched between bass guitar, rhythm guitar and keyboards. He also played piano accordion.

In 1977, Longmuir released "I'm Confessing", which peaked at number 44 in Australia. He played a mechanic in the 1980 film, Burning Rubber.

A one-man show called "I Ran With The Gang", which was performed at the Edinburgh Festival Fringe between 2014 and 2018, is about the life of Longmuir, and returned to the 2024 Fringe festival.

== Personal life ==
After leaving the Bay City Rollers in the 1970s, Longmuir spent much of his time fishing and looking after his horses on his farm in Dollar, Clackmannanshire. He went back to working as a plumber and water pipe inspector until 2000, and from then until retiring in 2014, was a bylaws inspector.

Longmuir was married twice, briefly to Jan Longmuir, from 1985 until their divorce in 1990; they had one son. His second, lasting marriage was to Eileen Rankin Longmuir, whom he met in 1994, from 1998 until his death; Eileen had two sons of her own, to whom Alan was step-father.

== Health ==
While owner of the Castle Campbell Hotel in Dollar, Clackmannanshire, he suffered two heart attacks (one happened in 1995) and a stroke in 1997, and in 2000 he decided to retrain as a building inspector. When Alan suffered the heart attack in 1995, Derek was one of the nurses who helped him recover. As a result of the stroke, the muscles in his left eye were damaged and he was paralysed down most of his left side.

Longmuir admitted suffering from alcoholism and "drinking into a premature grave", but was given help from his wife Eileen.

== Death ==
Longmuir died on 2 July 2018 at Forth Valley Royal Hospital in Larbert, Scotland, after contracting an illness before going on vacation in Mexico, where he had been a patient at the Galenia Hospital in Cancún but had been cleared to return home. He was 70 years old. He was flown by air ambulance from Mexico back to Scotland.

By his side at the time of his death were his wife, children and friends, including Les McKeown. Alan was told by medics in Mexico that a liver transplant could help him, but due to his age and medical history, there was "no hope" in the procedure.

Over £5,000 was raised at a celebration on Longmuir's life on 21 June 2019. Longmuir was remembered at New York's "tartan day" in 2022, to which Eileen was invited.

== Bibliography ==
- Stambler, Irwin, Encyclopedia of Pop, rock & Soul. 1974. St. Martin's Press, Inc., New York, New York, ISBN 0-312-25025-8
