= Les McKeown =

Scottish pop singer (1955–2021)

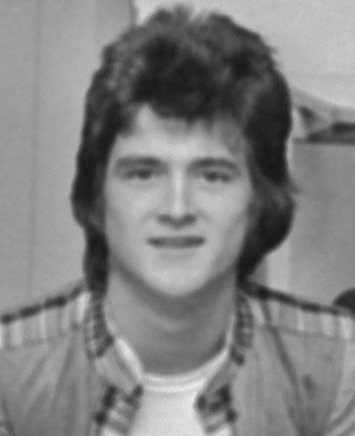
- McKeown in 1976

Background information
- Born: Leslie Richard McKeown; 12 November 1955; Edinburgh, Scotland
- Died: 20 April 2021 (aged 65) London, England
- Genre: Pop rock
- Occupations: Singer; songwriter
- Instruments: Vocals; guitar
- Years active: 1973–2021
- Formerly of: Bay City Rollers
- Spouse: Peko Keiko (m. 1983)

Leslie Richard McKeown (12 November 1955 – 20 April 2021) was a Scottish singer, best known as the lead vocalist of the pop rock band Bay City Rollers during their most successful period in the 1970s. The band's original lead singer, Gordon "Nobby" Clark, decided to leave the band in 1972 after fulfilling his touring obligations and McKeown joined the band as their lead vocalist by 1973 and began to re-record his vocals on tracks including "Remember (Sha-La-La-La)" and "Saturday Night", which then became a US number 1 hit.

The band released their debut album, Rollin (1974) once McKeown had become their established lead singer, and the album reached number one in the United Kingdom where it finished the year as the 16th best selling album and subsequently was certified Platinum. The band charted with the singles "Shang-a-Lang" and "Summerlove Sensation". Their second album, Once Upon a Star (1975), was supported by the release of the single "Bye, Bye, Baby" in February 1975. The single became the best-selling single of the year in the United Kingdom.

In 1975, the band secured their North American breakthrough with the release of "Saturday Night" after receiving backing from music executive Clive Davis. The release reached number 1 on the US Billboard Hot 100 as well as in Canada, and was certified Gold in both countries. The compilation album Bay City Rollers was released in September 1975, and reached number 1 in Canada and number 20 on the Billboard 200 albums charts in the United States. Subsequent albums, Wouldn't You Like It? (1975), Rock n' Roll Love Letter (1976), Dedication (1976) and It's a Game (1977) charted highly in the UK. McKeown decided to leave the band on "mutual agreement" in 1978, and launched a solo career which drew audiences in Japan initially.

He re-joined the band for a reunion performance in Japan in 1996, and became embroiled in legal disputes with their former record labels, Bell Records and Arista over claims of unpaid royalties. Further reunions, including McKeown on lead vocals, occurred in 2015 through to 2018. One of the most commercially successful acts of the 1970s, the band were called the "tartan teen sensations from Edinburgh", and sold between an estimated 120–300 million records worldwide, making them one of the best selling musical acts of all time globally.

== Early life ==
Leslie Richard McKeown was born in Broomhouse, a suburb close to the south-western city limit of Edinburgh, on 12 November 1955. His father, Francis, worked as a tailor and was deaf; his mother, Florence (née Close), was a seamstress who moved to Scotland after getting married. Both moved to the United Kingdom from Ireland. The family communicated with his father via hand signals. McKeown was raised in a city tenement block, attended Broomhouse Primary School, then nearby Forrester High School, and volunteered in the Boys' Brigade.

McKeown's mother, Florence Close McKeown, was born in Banbridge, Northern Ireland and died on 24 December 2002. Florence's mother died from a miscarriage when Florence was ten years old, something that Les said she still talked about daily until she herself died. For six months after her death, Florence's father, Hugh Henry Close, raised her, her two sisters and one brother by himself before marrying her step-mother. Her step-mother verbally and physically assaulted Florence and the family, and by age twelve, Florence had developed chronic asthma, an illness she believed was brought on by her step-mother's beatings, and had left school. When Hugh Close died aged 52, Florence was kicked out by her step-mother but was then "begged" to be brought back in when she wanted her to do all the housework. She would soon meet Francis (who was from Ballymena), the two eloped, and Florence left home for good. The couple were officially married in 1949 and had moved to Scotland.

Leslie left school at 15 and became a member of the band Threshold. He was employed at a paper mill in between the group's gigs, which earned them £20 per show. In his autobiography, Shang-a-Lang: Life as an International Pop Idol (2003), he admits he had a happy childhood in Broomhouse, but Edinburgh, in his view, was a drab place to live, he viewed it as a place to escape from. Among the core members of the band, McKeown was the only one, after the band ran its course, who did not go back to live in Scotland.

== Career ==
=== Bay City Rollers ===
==== Departure of "Nobby Clark" ====
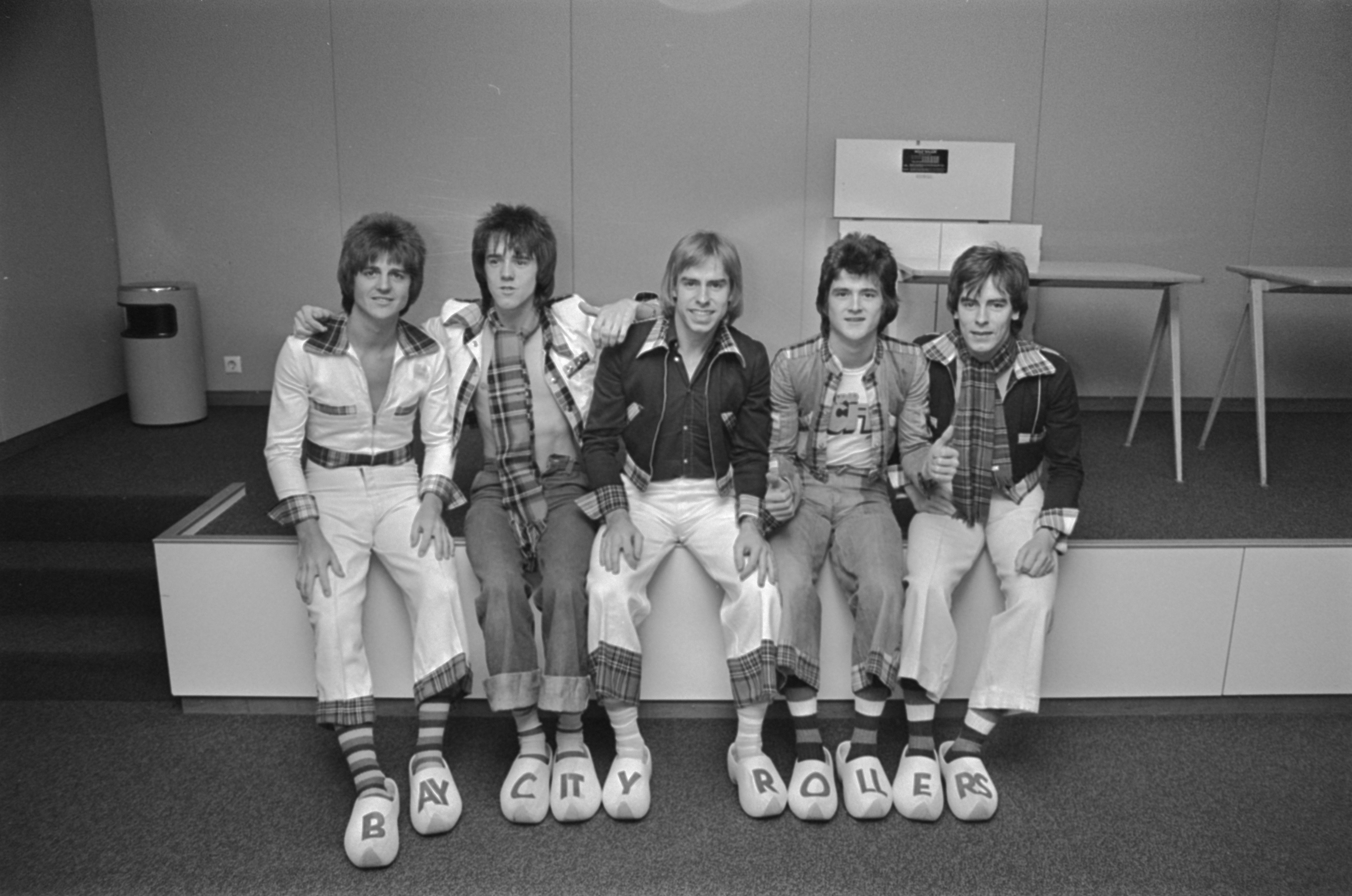
Bay City Rollers in 1976, with McKeown second from the right

McKeown joined the Bay City Rollers in November 1973, replacing founding lead singer Gordon "Nobby" Clark. He was initially reluctant to join the group, later stating in his memoir that it was not "high on my list of bands I'd have wanted to join". The band only achieved national, and then international, popularity after McKeown joined. That said, the locally well-known band, with a recording contract with a minor label, was already established and the newly recruited singer, in his autobiography, maintains that there always was a chasm between him and the rest of the band, despite the fact they were of, more or less, the same age and shared similar backgrounds. The rest of the band members were all from Craigmillar/Liberton, suburbs of similar character to Broomhouse, but near to the southern border of the city, and as the subtitle of his autobiography suggests, McKeown had no pretension to be a rock musician/artist unlike some members of the band.

His arrival also coincided with an overhaul of the group's image introducing half-mast trousers, platform shoes and tartan. They had four songs in the Top 10 in 1974 ("Remember", "Summerlove Sensation", "All of Me Loves All of You", and "Shang-a-Lang" which featured McKeown as the frontman). This was followed by 2 UK number ones ("Bye Bye Baby", "Give a Little Love") and a U.S. number one ("Saturday Night", which was re-recorded with McKeown as the lead vocalist) a year later. Their manager Tam Paton, who was concerned about the inadequacy of the band's musical capabilities, apart from McKeown's singing talent and good looks, chose songs for them and hired song writers and competent studio musicians for the recordings. As a result, often in the Bay City Rollers' recordings, McKeown's vocals were the only musical contributions from the band.

==== Commercial success ====
Before McKeown officially joined the Bay City Rollers, they recorded and released "Remember (Sha-La-La-La)" which was given a "perfunctory release" in the United Kingdom as a consequence of the decision by Dick Leahy, the manager of Bell Records, to drop the band from the label following its release. Bell Records showed no real enthusiasm for the song, leaving the band’s manager Tam Paton to visit Leahy and "beg him" to give the band "one last chance", later claiming that he believed Leahy only agreed to do so because he "felt sorry" for him. Furthermore, by the end of 1972, Clark had become disillusioned with the band's musical direction and decided to leave the band. Despite the concerns from Bell Records over the future of the band and the decision by Clark to leave, "Remember (Sha-La-La-La)" reached its peak of number six on the singles charts in the United Kingdom. Manager Tam Paton "begged" Clark to appear with the band on Top of the Pops to perform the song. Whilst Clark agreed to do the performance on Top of the Pops, Paton believed this was a signal that he had changed his mind about leaving the band, and was hopeful this would be the case for an upcoming show scheduled in Perth, Scotland, however, Clark refused to perform at the concert and thereafter officially left the band.

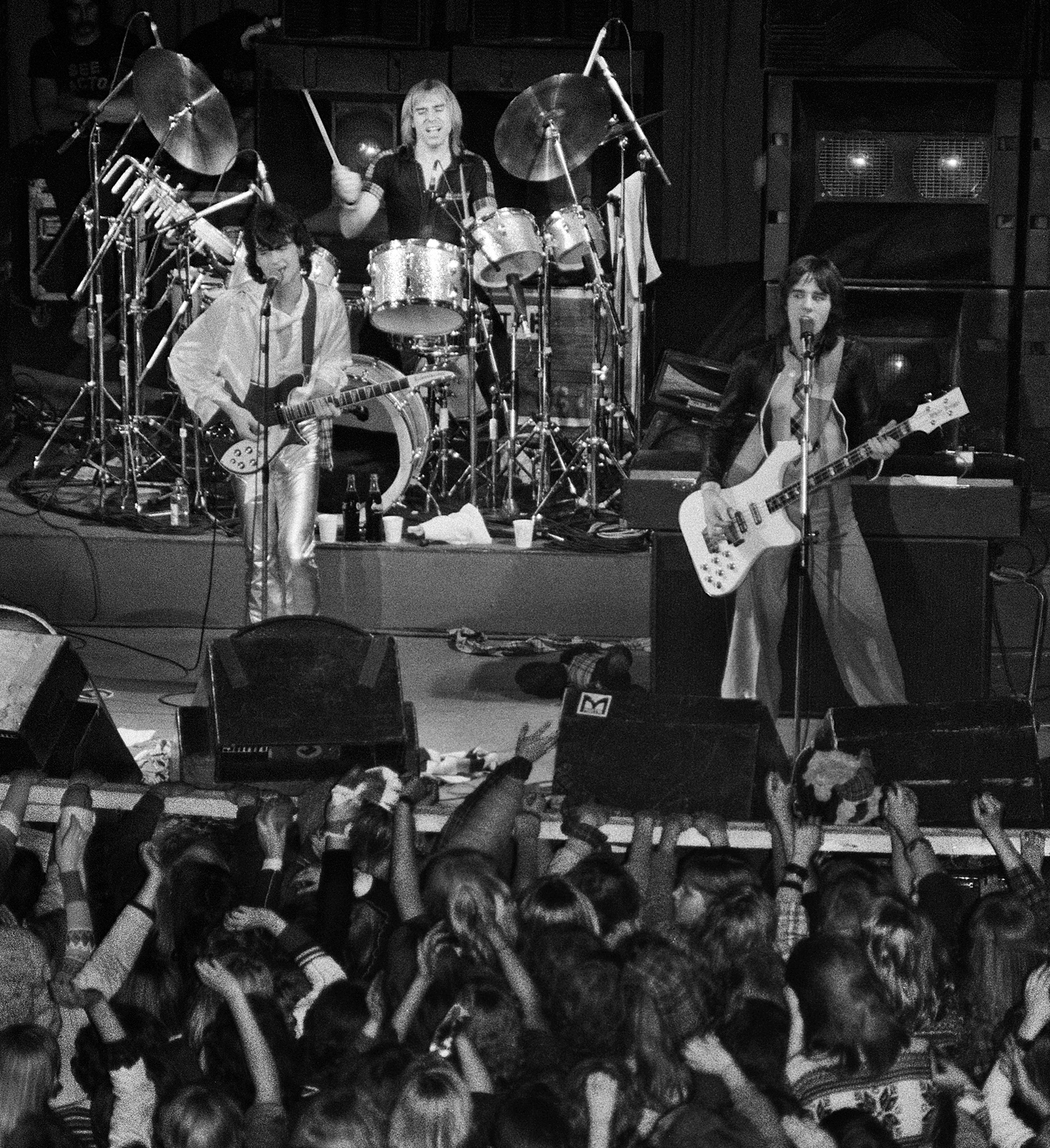
The Bay City Rollers performing in Helsinki, February 1978

Clark was eventually replaced as the lead singer of the band by McKeown, and a couple of months later, in early 1974, what became known as the classic line-up was completed, with guitarist John Devine being replaced by Stuart "Woody" Wood. Clark had originally recorded lead vocals on "Saturday Night", however, his vocals were removed and re-recorded by McKeown. The version of "Saturday Night" with Clark on lead vocals struggled to come to any release fruition, however, in contrast, McKeown's version achieved considerable commercial success, reaching number 1 on the US Hot 100. Clark disputed which version of the song had become a hit, claiming that he was "long overdue royalties".

In October 1974, the band released their debut album Rollin' to commercial success. It reached number one on the albums charts in the UK, and became the 16th best selling album of the year. Additionally, it performed well in international terriorities including Australia where it reached number eight, Finland where it reached number eighteen, and Japan where it reached number thirty-seven. By early 1975, the band were one of the biggest-selling acts in the United Kingdom. Their 1975 UK tour prompted newspaper headlines about the rise of "Rollermania".

With increasing popularity in the United Kingdom and in a number of international markets, a concerted effort was made by Arista Records (the record company that evolved from Bell) to launch the band in North America. The new head of Arista Records, Clive Davis, was instrumental in grooming and overseeing the project. After efforts from both the record label and Davis, the band achieved commercial breakthrough in the United States, as in late 1975 the Bay City Rollers reached No. 1 on the US Billboard Hot 100 with "Saturday Night". In 1975, they released their first album in North America, Bay City Rollers which peaked at number 1 in Canada on 7 February, and number 20 on the US Billboard 200 albums charts.

==== Departure ====
McKeown left the group in 1978 as its popularity began to decline. He was replaced by the South African singer Duncan Faure, who sang on three albums. In 1982, McKeown, Alan and Derek Longmuir, Stuart Wood, Ian Mitchell, and Pat McGlynn reunited for a tour of Japan that lasted until the next year.

==== Accusations against Tam Paton ====
McKeown later wrote that he was raped by Paton and that Paton provided him with Mandrax and amphetamines to help him cope with the pressures of touring.

=== Solo career ===
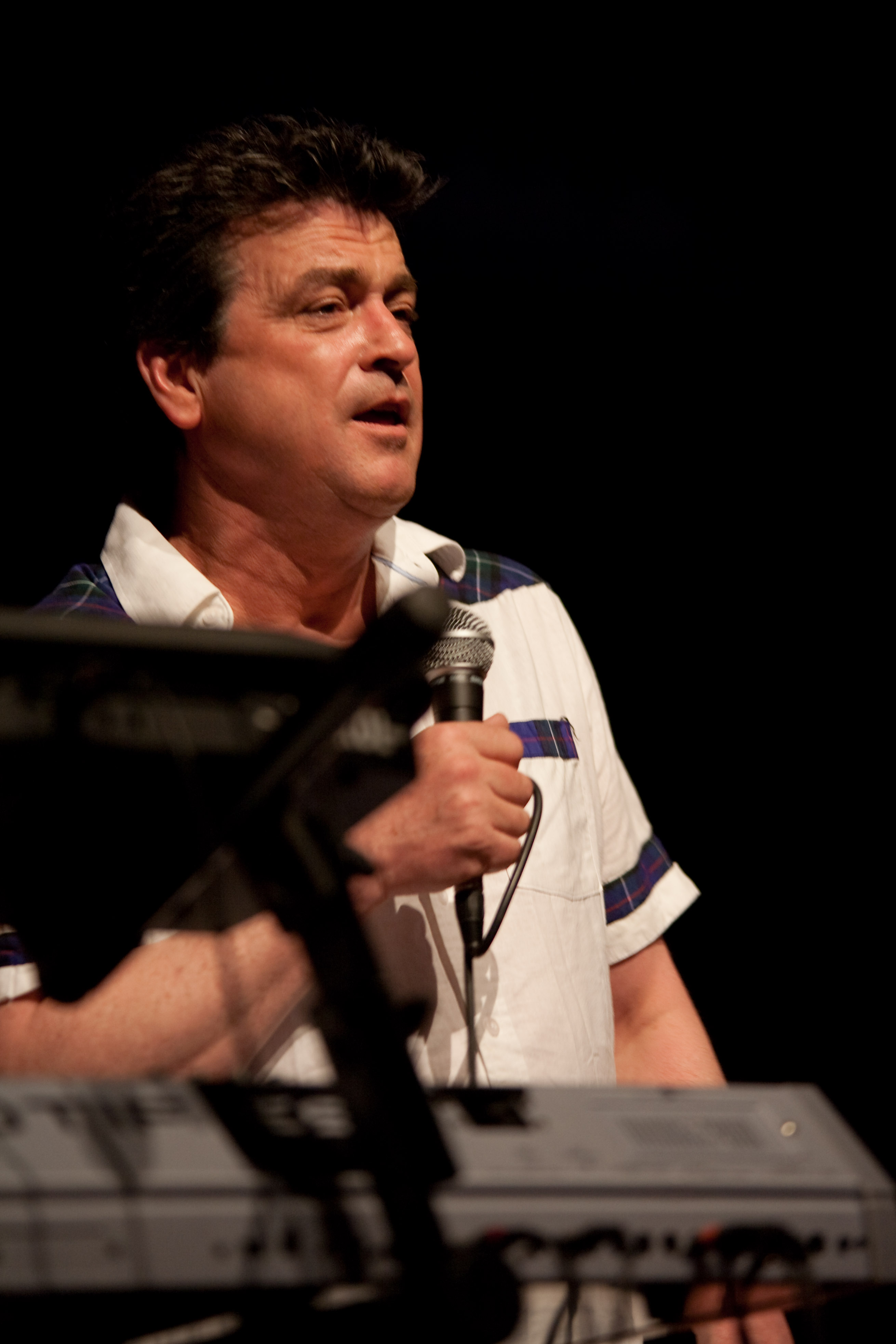
McKeown performing in 2010

In 1979, McKeown launched a solo career with his debut album All Washed Up. Despite a lack of commercial success other than in Japan, the album became memorable for its cover art which showed McKeown "wading out of the sea and in the distance was the wreck of a plane and crash victims holding guitars", something which was believed to be his former Bay City Rollers bandmates. McKeown released additional material in Japan which failed to match the commercial success of All Washed Up. In 1980, he released a further three albums – The Face of Love, 100% Live and The Greatest.

In 1981, he released his fourth album, Heart Control (1982), followed by It's a Game (1989), Love Letter (1993) and lastly The Lost Songs (2016). In May 2021, his single "Goodbye" debuted at number forty-six on the UK Singles Downloads Chart, and number forty-eight on the official national singles charts in the United Kingdom.

=== Later works ===
Throughout the 2000s, McKeown and several other members of the band were in court trying to receive unpaid royalties.

He established the pop band Egotrip and released a solo album in 1979 titled All Washed Up, which was successful in Japan. He went on to release eight more solo albums. He rejoined the Bay City Rollers in 2015 for a series of reunion shows, the first of which, at Glasgow's Barrowlands, sold out in three minutes. He released his final album, The Lost Songs, in 2016.

Prior to the Bay City Rollers reunions, McKeown had toured the UK as "Les McKeown's Bay City Rollers". In 2019, McKeown accused Stuart Wood of "exaggerating" his friendship following the death of Alan Longmuir to promote shows Wood was performing at.

== Artistry and legacy ==
During his time with the Bay City Rollers and his subsequent solo career, McKeown continued to receive considerable commercial success in Japan, and was described as remaining a "sex symbol" up until the time of his death in the country. He was said to have "embraced the Japanese culture and lifestyle", something attributed to his marriage to a Japanese native, and "how the mutual love affair with Japan lasted four decades".

== Personal life and death ==
McKeown revealed in 2009 that he was sexually assaulted when he was seventeen.

McKeown accidentally killed an elderly neighbour in 1975 as a result of reckless driving, for which he was banned from driving for one year and fined £100. He later revealed how the guilt he felt over the event played a key role in his alcoholism. He was fined and banned from driving for 18 months after another incident in 2015 when driving while drunk.

McKeown married Peko Keiko, a native of Japan, in 1983. They had a son. In 2008, McKeown stayed at a treatment facility in California, US for four months, successfully overcoming his addiction to alcohol. One year later, in the Living TV show Rehab, covering celebrities fighting addiction, he disclosed that he was a "secret bisexual" and admitted being unfaithful to his wife with both men and women.

McKeown died on 20 April 2021, at the age of 65, after going into cardiac arrest at his home in London. A coroner's report concluded that his death was from "a combination of natural causes"; he had cardiovascular disease and hypertension, at least partially caused by years of drug and alcohol abuse.

== Discography ==
=== Solo ===
==== Albums ====
Title	Year
All Washed Up	1979
The Face of Love	1980
100% Live	1980
The Greatest	1980
Sweet Pain	1981
Heart Control	1982
It's a Game	1989
Love Letter	1993
The Lost Songs	2016

==== Singles ====
Title	Year
"Shall I Do It" / "Do It All"	1979
"Replaced by a Micro Chip" / "Everything with Chips"	1979
"Long Distance Love" / "Long Distance Love" (Live)	1979
"Sayonara" / "Dedicate This Record"	1980
"Sylvie my Love" / "You’re the Woman for Me"	1980
"Tender Love" / "Love Shine on Me"	1981
"Roller Days" / "Heart Control"	1981
"She's a Lady" / "She's a Lady" (Instrumental)	1988
"Love is Just a Breath Away" / "Different Mixes"	1988
"It's a Game" / "It's a Game" (Instrumental) / "It's a Game" (Radio Version)	1989
"Love Hurts and Love Heals" / "Love Hurts and Love Heals" (Instrumental) / "Love Hurts and Love Heals" (Radio Version)	1989
"Nobody Makes Me Crazy" / "Looking for Love"	1989

== Bibliography ==
- McKeown, Les; Elliott, Lynne; Welsh, Irvine (2003). Shang-a-lang: Life as an International Pop Idol. Mainstream. ISBN 1-84018-651-8.

== Sources ==
- Stambler, Irwin, Encyclopedia of Pop, Rock & Soul. 1974. St. Martin's Press, Inc., New York, N.Y. ISBN 0-312-02573-4
