= List of Canadian number-one albums of 1976 =

This article lists the Canadian number-one albums of 1976. The chart was compiled and published by RPM every Saturday.

The top position [December 27, 1975, Vol. 24, No. 14] preceding January 10 [Vol. 24, No. 15] was Elton John's Rock of the Westies. Stevie Wonder's Songs in the Key of Life entered the chart at #1. Three acts held the top position in the albums and singles charts simultaneously: The Bay City Rollers on March 13, Wings on June 5–12 and Rod Stewart on December 18.)

(Entries with dates marked thus* are not presently on record at Library and Archives Canada and were inferred from the following week's listing.)

Issue Date	Album	Artist
January 3	Rock of the Westies	Elton John
January 10	Chicago IX – Chicago's Greatest Hits	Chicago
January 17	Chicago IX – Chicago's Greatest Hits	Chicago
January 24	History: America's Greatest Hits	America
January 31*	Main Course	Bee Gees
February 7	Bay City Rollers	Bay City Rollers
February 14	Bay City Rollers	Bay City Rollers
February 21	Bay City Rollers	Bay City Rollers
February 28	Bay City Rollers	Bay City Rollers
March 6	Bay City Rollers	Bay City Rollers
March 13	Bay City Rollers	Bay City Rollers
March 20	Bay City Rollers	Bay City Rollers
March 27	Rock n' Roll Love Letter	Bay City Rollers
April 3	Greatest Hits	Nazareth
April 10	Frampton Comes Alive!	Peter Frampton
April 17	Rock n' Roll Love Letter	Bay City Rollers
April 24	Rock n' Roll Love Letter	Bay City Rollers
May 1	Their Greatest Hits (1971–1975)	The Eagles
May 8	The Whole World's Goin' Crazy	April Wine
May 15	The Whole World's Goin' Crazy	April Wine
May 24	Rock n' Roll Love Letter	Bay City Rollers
May 29	Wings at the Speed of Sound	Wings
June 5	Wings at the Speed of Sound	Wings
June 12	Wings at the Speed of Sound	Wings
June 19	Wings at the Speed of Sound	Wings
June 26	Wings at the Speed of Sound	Wings
July 3	Wings at the Speed of Sound	Wings
July 10	Wings at the Speed of Sound	Wings
July 17	Wings at the Speed of Sound	Wings
July 24	Frampton Comes Alive!	Peter Frampton
July 31*	Frampton Comes Alive!	Peter Frampton
August 7	Frampton Comes Alive!	Peter Frampton
August 14	Frampton Comes Alive!	Peter Frampton
August 21	Frampton Comes Alive!	Peter Frampton
August 28	Frampton Comes Alive!	Peter Frampton
September 4	Frampton Comes Alive!	Peter Frampton
September 11	Summertime Dream	Gordon Lightfoot
September 18	Summertime Dream	Gordon Lightfoot
September 25	Frampton Comes Alive!	Peter Frampton
October 2	Frampton Comes Alive!	Peter Frampton
October 9	Their Greatest Hits (1971–1975)	The Eagles
October 16	Songs in the Key of Life	Stevie Wonder
October 23*	Songs in the Key of Life	Stevie Wonder
October 30	Songs in the Key of Life	Stevie Wonder
November 6	Songs in the Key of Life	Stevie Wonder
November 13	Songs in the Key of Life	Stevie Wonder
November 20	Songs in the Key of Life	Stevie Wonder
November 27	Frampton Comes Alive!	Peter Frampton
December 4	Frampton Comes Alive!	Peter Frampton
December 11	Frampton Comes Alive!	Peter Frampton
December 18	A Night on the Town	Rod Stewart
December 25	Songs in the Key of Life	Stevie Wonder

== See also ==
- 1976 in music
- RPM number-one hits of 1976
