= Rock n' Roll Love Letter =

1976 album by Bay City Rollers

Rock N'Roll Love Letter

Studio album by Bay City Rollers
- Released: March 1976
- Recorded: 1975
- Genres: Glam rock, power pop, pop rock
- Length: 32:23
- Label: Arista
- Producers: Phil Wainman, Colin Fretcher

Bay City Rollers chronology
Wouldn't You Like It? (1975)	Rock N'Roll Love Letter (1976)	Dedication (1976)

Professional ratings
Review scores
Source	Rating
Allmusic	3.5/5 stars
Christgau's Record Guide	C+

Rock N' Roll Love Letter is a compilation album by the Bay City Rollers, released only in North America in early 1976 by Arista Records. Its release was supported by two singles: "Money Honey" and the title track, both of which achieved commercial success on the US Billboard Hot 100 and were later included on their next album, Dedication (1976), except on US pressings.

== Background and release ==
Of the record's 11 tracks, two were lifted from the Rollers' 1975 UK release Once Upon a Star; seven came from Wouldn't You Like It?; and two were newly recorded. The cover art features the same photo as Wouldn't You Like It?.

The album reached No. 1 in Canada on 27 March 1976, jumping from No. 25 to the top position in a single week to depose their previous album Bay City Rollers from the top slot. In the US, it went as high as No. 31 on Billboard's Pop Albums chart. Two singles from the disc made the charts in both countries: "Money Honey", which reached No. 1 in Canada, peaked at No. 9 in the US; and "Rock and Roll Love Letter", peaking at No. 6 in Canada (12 June 1976) and No. 28 in the US.

This album was finally released on CD (along with Bay City Rollers) as a two-LP-on-one-CD set in 2011, by Wounded Bird Records.

== Track listing ==
All tracks are written by Eric Faulkner and Stuart "Woody" Wood except where noted.

1. "Money Honey"
2. "La Belle Jeane"
3. "Rock and Roll Love Letter" (Tim Moore)
4. "Maybe I'm a Fool to Love You"
5. "Wouldn't You Like It"
6. "I Only Wanna Dance With You"
7. "Shanghai'd in Love"
8. "Don't Stop the Music"
9. "The Disco Kid"
10. "Eagles Fly"
11. "Too Young to Rock & Roll"

== Chart performance ==
=== Weekly charts ===
Chart (1976)	Peak position
Canada Top Albums/CDs (RPM)	1
US Billboard 200	31

=== Year-end charts ===
Chart (1976)	Position
Canada Top Albums/CDs (RPM)	6

== Personnel ==
- Eric Faulkner – guitar
- Alan Longmuir – bass guitar
- Derek Longmuir – drums
- Les McKeown – lead vocals
- Stuart "Woody" Wood – guitar
