= Home Thoughts from Abroad =

1845 poem by Robert Browning

- by Robert Browning
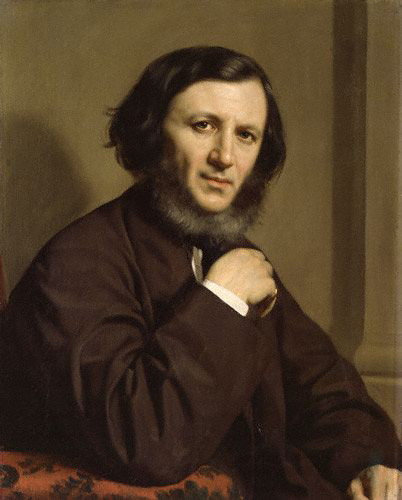
- Poet Robert Browning
- First published in: 1845
- Country: United Kingdom
- Language: English
- Genre: Romantic literature
- Form: Sonnet
- Lines: 19
- Preceded by: "The Lost Mistress"
- Followed by: "Home-Thoughts, from the Sea"
- Metre: Irregular

Full text
- Home Thoughts, From Abroad at Wikisource

"Home Thoughts, from Abroad" is a poem by Robert Browning. It was written in 1845 while Browning was on a visit to northern Italy, and was first published in his Dramatic Romances and Lyrics. It is considered an exemplary work of Romantic literature for its evocation of a sense of longing and sentimental references to natural beauty.

== Text ==
The poem is written as a first person in which the speaker expresses feelings of homesickness through sentimental references to the English countryside. The poem's opening lines are renowned for their evocation of patriotic nostalgia:

Oh, to be in England / Now that April’s there

Browning makes sentimental references to the flora of an English springtime, including brushwood, elm trees and pear tree blossom and to the sound of birdsong from chaffinches, whitethroats, swallows and thrushes. The speaker in the poem concludes by stating that the blooming English buttercups will be brighter than the "gaudy melon-flower" seen growing in Italy.

The poem is in two stanzas. The first stanza has an irregular metre consisting of alternating trimeter, tetrameter and pentameter lines and a final trimeter line, with an ABABCCDD rhyming scheme. The second stanza is longer consists almost entirely of pentameter lines except for one tetrameter line, and the rhyme is an AABCBCDDEEFF scheme.

== Legacy ==
Browning's poem inspired singer-songwriter Clifford T Ward in his sentimental 1973 song "Home Thoughts from Abroad", which also makes reference to other romantic poets John Keats and William Wordsworth.

In 1995, Browning's "Home Thoughts from Abroad" was voted 46th in a BBC poll to find the United Kingdom's favourite poems.
