= The Best Is Yet to Come (disambiguation) =

"The Best Is Yet to Come" is a song written in 1959 by Cy Coleman, and generally associated with Frank Sinatra.

The Best Is Yet to Come may also refer to:

== Music ==
=== Albums ===
- The Best Is Yet to Come (Ella Fitzgerald album), 1982
- The Best Is Yet to Come (Grover Washington Jr. album), 1982
- The Best Is Yet to Come, a 2000 album by Shannon
- The Best Is Yet to Come, a 2003 album by Martha Munizzi
- The Best Is Yet to Come, a 2011 album by Laura Fygi
- The Best Is Yet to Come (Bonnie Tyler album), a 2021 album by Bonnie Tyler

=== Songs ===
- "The Best Is Yet to Come" (Clifford T. Ward song), 1981
- "The Best Is Yet to Come", a 1987 song by Samantha Fox from the album Samantha Fox
- "The Best Is Yet to Come" (Grover Washington Jr. song), 1982
- "The Best Is Yet to Come", a 1998 song on the Metal Gear Solid Original Game Soundtrack
- "The Best Is Yet to Come" (Donald Lawrence song), 2002
- "The Best Is Yet to Come", a song by Kids In Glass Houses from the 2010 album Dirt
- "The Best Is Yet to Come", a song by Scorpions from the 2010 album Sting in the Tail
- "The Best Is Yet to Come", a song by Anneke van Giersbergen from the 2013 album Drive
- "The Best Is Yet to Come", a song by Sheppard from the 2014 album Bombs Away
- "The Best Is Yet to Come", a song by Mike + The Mechanics from the 2017 album Let Me Fly
- "The Best Is Yet to Come", a two-song single by Ben Rector

== Other uses ==
- The Best Is Yet to Come (1951 film), a film on cancer
- The Best Is Yet to Come (2019 film), a French comedy-drama film
- The Best Is Yet to Come (2020 film), a Chinese drama film
- The Best Is Yet to Come: Coping with Divorce and Enjoying Life Again, Book by Ivana Trump 1995

== See also ==
- Best Is Yet to Come (disambiguation)
