= It's a Game =

It's a Game may refer to:

- It's a Game (Bay City Rollers album) or the title song (see below), 1977
- It's a Game (Edith Frost album) or the title song, 2005
- It's a Game (Les McKeown album) or the title song, 1988
- "It's a Game", a song by String Driven Thing, 1973; covered by the Bay City Rollers, 1977
