= Boy band =

Vocal group consisting of young males

A boy band is a vocal group consisting of young male singers, usually in their teenage years or in their twenties at the time of formation. Generally, boy bands perform love songs marketed towards girls and young women. Many boy bands dance as well as sing, usually giving highly choreographed performances. South Korean boy bands usually also have designated rappers. Most boy band members do not play musical instruments, either in recording sessions or on stage. They are similar in concept to their counterparts known as girl groups.

Some boy bands are formed on their own, but most are created by talent managers or record producers who hold auditions. The popularity of boy bands has peaked three times: first in the 1960s to 1970s, with e.g. the Jackson 5, the Bay City Rollers, and the Osmonds; the second time during the late 1980s, the 1990s and the 2000s, when acts such as New Kids on the Block, Take That, Backstreet Boys, Boyzone, NSYNC, Five, Westlife and Blue dominated global pop charts; and the latest time in the 2010s up to the present, with the emergence of groups such as Big Time Rush, the Wanted, One Direction, Soulidified, and K-pop acts such as BTS and Seventeen.

== History ==
The term boy band was not established until the late 1980s when Lou Pearlman decided to form a record company to promote a new singing and dancing group after becoming fascinated with the success of New Kids on the Block.

Although generally described as a rock band, the highest-selling band in history – the Beatles – have been described by several journalists as "the first" or "the original" boy band, "before anyone had thought of the term", exclusively due to the enthusiastic response they received from their young female audience.

The Liverpool quartet known as the Beatles were not only the quintessential rock band, but many considered John Lennon, Paul McCartney, George Harrison and Ringo Star [sic] to be the original boy band – especially in the early 1960s when young girls would scream at the top of their lungs and pass out upon first sight of the "Fab Four".

— The Hollywood Reporter

Other critics, however, have pointed out that this assessment of the Beatles as a "boy band" could be applied to all other bands of the 1960s, saying, "if they were a (boy band), so was everyone else" and is countered by others, including Ringo Starr, who point out that, from the beginning, the Beatles wrote and exercised creative control over their own music, played their own instruments, were not manufactured by a record label, and did not feature the choreographed dance moves that later came to be associated with boy bands. The Beatles did, however, inspire the production of the 1966 television series The Monkees, which featured a music group of the same name, created for the show, that consisted of the four starring actors. The Monkees had a career as a rock and pop band after their songs from the TV series were released as successful records.

=== Late 1960s and 1970s: the Jackson 5, the Osmonds and the Bay City Rollers ===
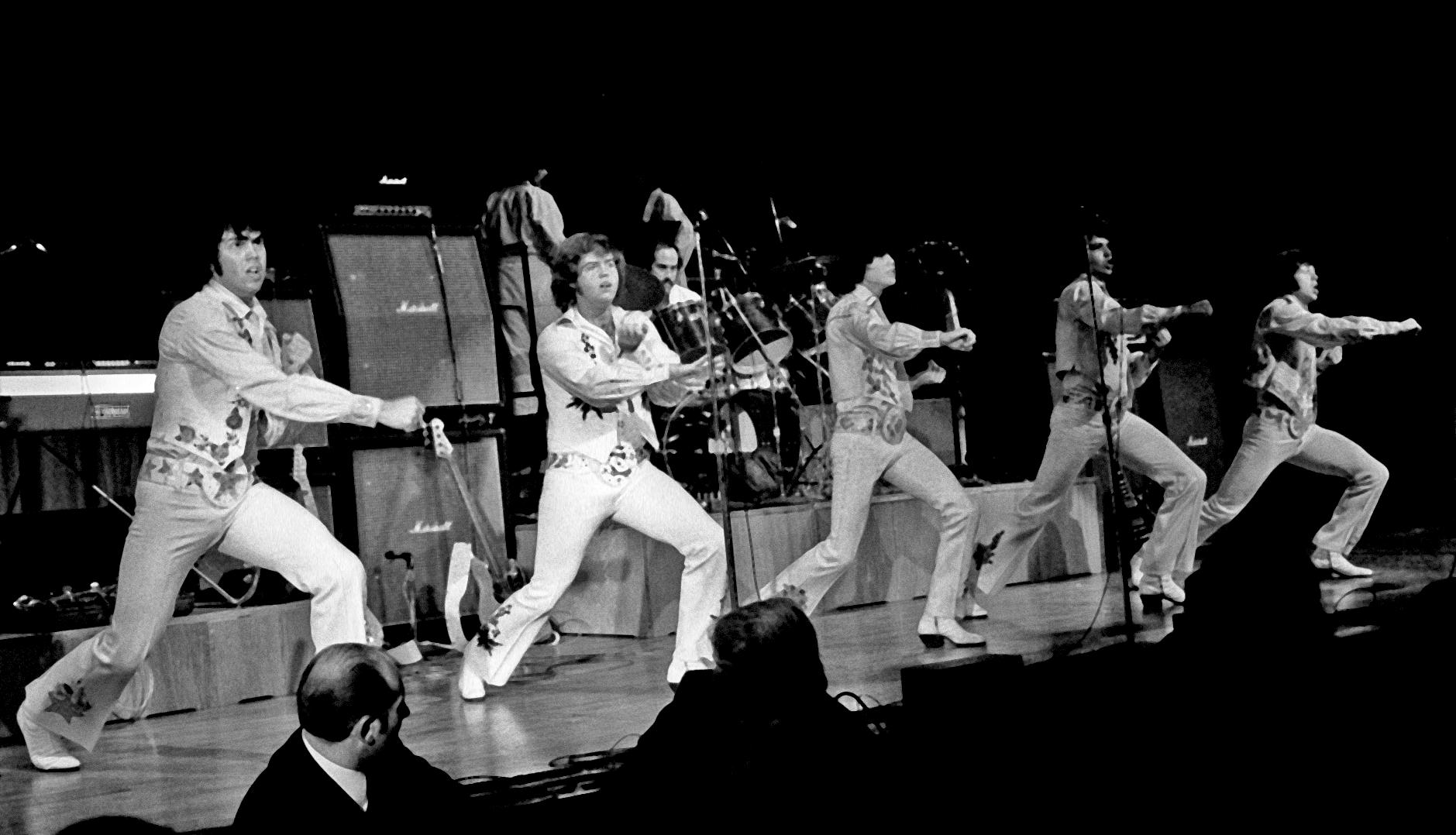
The Osmonds

Although the term "boy band" was not commonly used then, the earliest predecessors of this format were groups such as the Jackson 5 and the Osmonds which helped form the template for boy bands. The Jackson 5 were a sibling group that established many musical conventions that boy bands follow. For instance, their music featured close harmonies from soul music and catchy pop hooks influenced as much as they were by Motown and acts like the Supremes. The group also incorporated choreographed dance moves to their performances. All members of the band sang, which is a common convention of a boy band, as opposed to having a front man and the rest on instruments; thus, no one person dominated the stage. Also a sibling group, The Osmonds first started singing barbershop music for local audiences, before being hired to perform at Disneyland early in their career. Their appearance in a televised Disney special earned them additional TV spots, such as The Andy Williams Show and The Jerry Lewis Show.

Scottish rock boy band, the Bay City Rollers, achieved considerable success commercially worldwide during the 1970s, becoming "the first of many acts heralded as the 'biggest group since the Beatles' and one of the most screamed-at teeny-bopper acts of the 1970s". They have sold an estimated 120 million records worldwide, however some claim their record sales could be as high as 300 million. Their debut studio album, Rollin' (1974) achieved considerable commercial success internationally, debuting atop the albums charts in the United Kingdom, as well as the top ten in Australia. It also reached the top forty of the albums charts in Canada, Japan and New Zealand, and finished 1975 as the 16th best selling album of the year in the United Kingdom. In May 1975, they released their second album, Once Upon a Star, which continued their commercial success, again topping the albums charts in the United Kingdom and reaching the top ten in Finland and Australia. It spawned the successful single "Bye, Bye Baby" which reached number one on the singles charts in the United Kingdom, Ireland and Australia, and became the best–selling single of 1975 in the United Kingdom. Their first full-length album to be released in the United States and Canada, Bay City Rollers, was released in September 1975, topping the albums charts in Canada and peaking at number twenty on the US Billboard 200.

In Japan, Johnny Kitagawa formed his first boy band in 1962, called Johnnys and after their initial success, started the company Johnny & Associates, that continued to produce highly successful new groups in the following decades. He also established the trainee system, under the name Johnny's Jr., that was later adapted by the K-Pop industry.

=== Late 1970s and 1980s: Menudo, New Edition, and New Kids on the Block ===
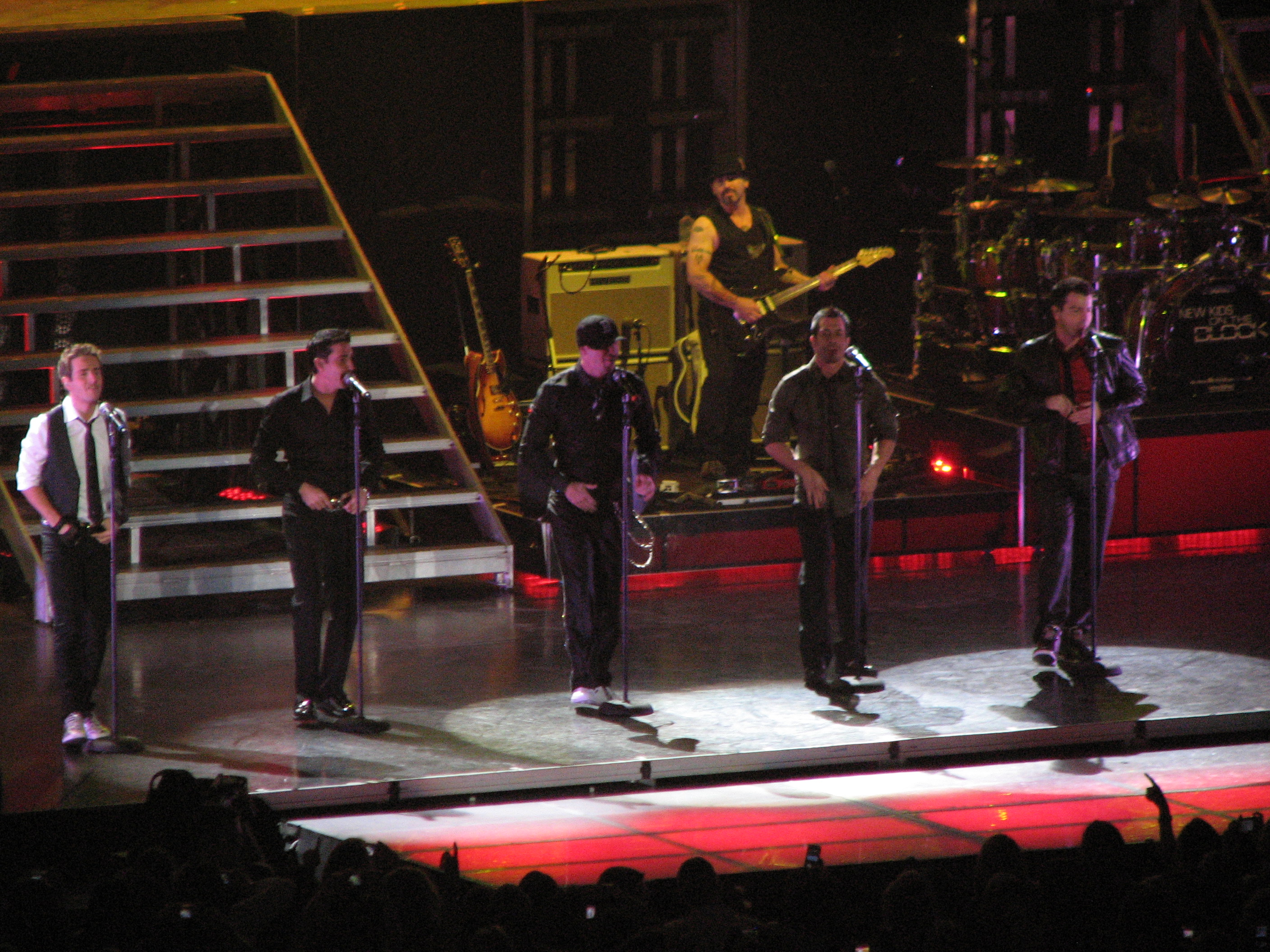
New Kids on the Block in concert, November 2008

The Puerto Rican boy band Menudo, appealing to young Latina audiences, was founded in 1977. Menudo had a convention unique among boy bands: when a member turned 16, became too tall, or their voice changed, they were replaced. The members of Menudo were generally aged 12–16. Menudo had a large impact in Latin America and in Asia; Menudo fever there was compared to Beatlemania and it was nicknamed "Menudomania".

Boston group New Edition was formed in 1978 and reached their height of popularity in the 1980s, meaning they are often credited for starting the boy-band trend, even though the term "boy band" did not exist until the 1990s. Maurice Starr was influenced by New Edition and popularized it with his protégé New Kids on the Block (NKOTB), the first commercially successful modern boy band, which formed in 1984 and found international success in 1988. Starr's idea was to take the traditional template from the R&B genre (in this case his teenage band New Edition) and apply it to a pop genre.

Bros (abbreviation of the word "brothers") were a British boy band active in the late 1980s and early 1990s, consisting of twin brothers Matt and Luke Goss along with Craig Logan. Formed in 1986, they scored multiple top 10 hits between 1987 and 1989 and in 1988 became the first modern era–style boy band to have a multiple platinum-selling album in the UK, with Push, still one of the most successful boy-band albums in the UK. Other big boy bands in Britain during the late 1980s were Big Fun and Brother Beyond.

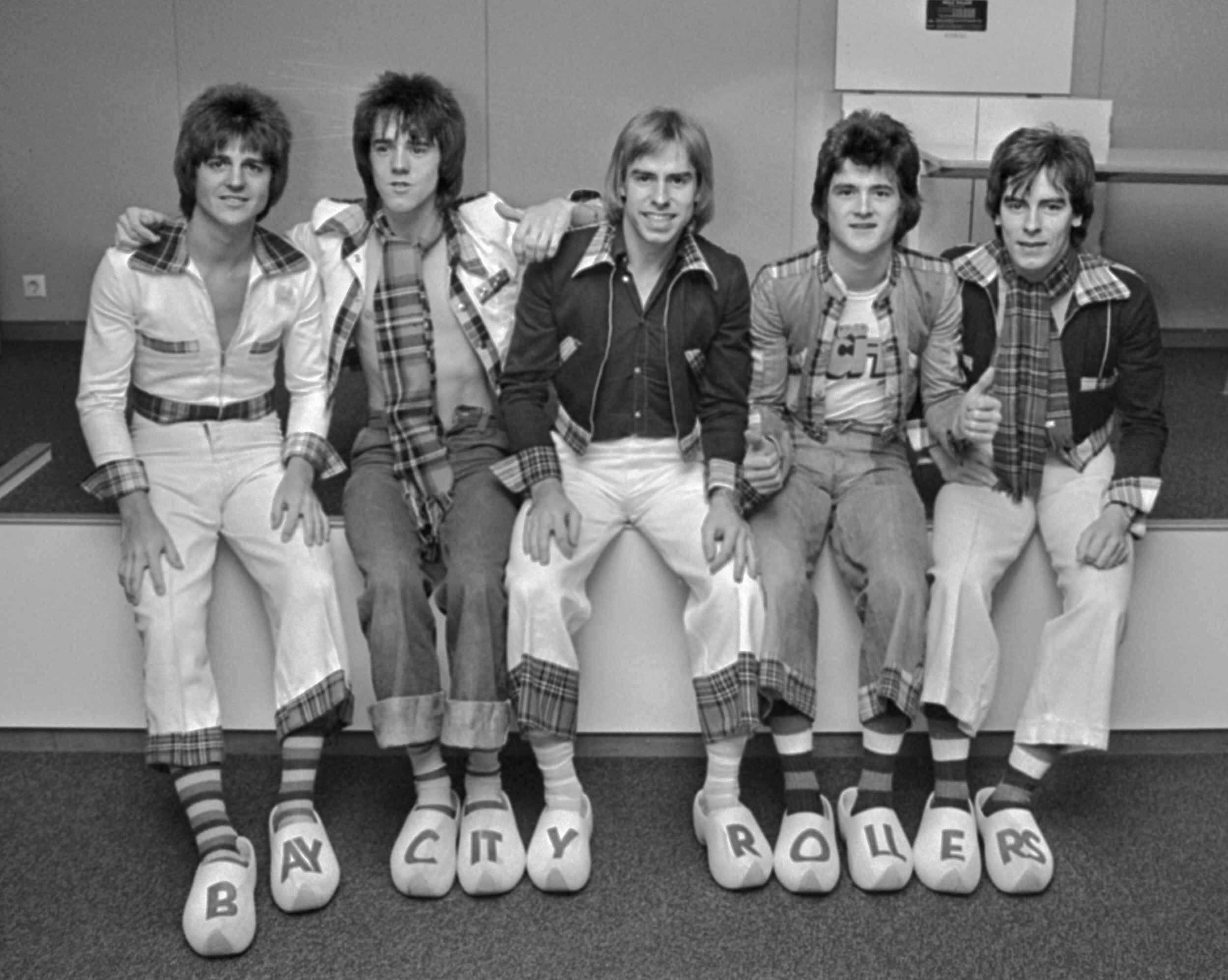
Scottish rock group Bay City Rollers achieved international success during the 1970s and sold between an estimated 120–300 million records worldwide.

=== 1990s: Boyz II Men, Take That, Backstreet Boys, NSYNC, Westlife, Seo Taiji and Boys and the birth of modern K-pop ===
The ongoing international success of New Kids on the Block inspired music managers in Europe to create their own acts, beginning with Nigel Martin-Smith's Take That in the UK (formed in 1990) and followed by Tom Watkins, who had success with Bros in the late 1980s and formed East 17 in 1991. East 17 were marketed and pitted against Take That as "rivals" with a rougher or harsher attitude, style and sound. Take That reformed in 2006 after a decade-long hiatus and became one of the most successful groups in British music chart history, with renewed chart success internationally, especially in Europe. Irish music manager Louis Walsh, who had witnessed the impact of these British boy bands, put out an advert for an "Irish Take That", thereby creating Boyzone in 1993. MN8 (formed in 1992), Let Loose (formed in 1993), and Damage and 911 (formed in 1995) were also successful boy bands in Britain; however, by the late 1990s all these bands had split up.

All these artists were very successful on both the singles and albums charts domestically and internationally; however, with the emergence of Britpop and the commercial co-option of indie rock, many boy bands were ridiculed by the British music press as having no artistic credibility, although some, such as East 17 and Take That, did write most of their own material. The media attention was then placed on the "Battle of Britpop", and the bands Oasis and Blur replaced the importance and rivalry of Take That and East 17 as the two new biggest bands in Britain. However, boy bands continued to find success in the late 1990s, such as Five, Another Level, Point Break and Westlife. In 1995 successful German music manager Frank Farian, who had been manager of Boney M and Milli Vanilli, put together Latin American band No Mercy who scored a few worldwide hits during the mid-90s.

Although being American and the sons of Tito Jackson, a member of the Jackson 5, 3T had several hits singles across Europe in the mid-1990s, despite limited success in the US, and finished the second biggest selling act of 1996 in Europe behind the Spice Girls. In Japan, SMAP debuted under Johnny & Associates in 1991, and became the agency's most successful group to date, enjoying tremendous success and selling over 35 million records.

In 1992, South-Korean artist Seo Taiji formed the boy band Seo Taiji and Boys (Korean: 서태지와 아이들) together with dancers Lee Juno and Yang Hyun-suk, which went on to become highly successful and is credited with changing the South Korean music industry by pioneering the incorporation of rap and breakdance, creating the prototype for the modern hybrid K-pop genre.

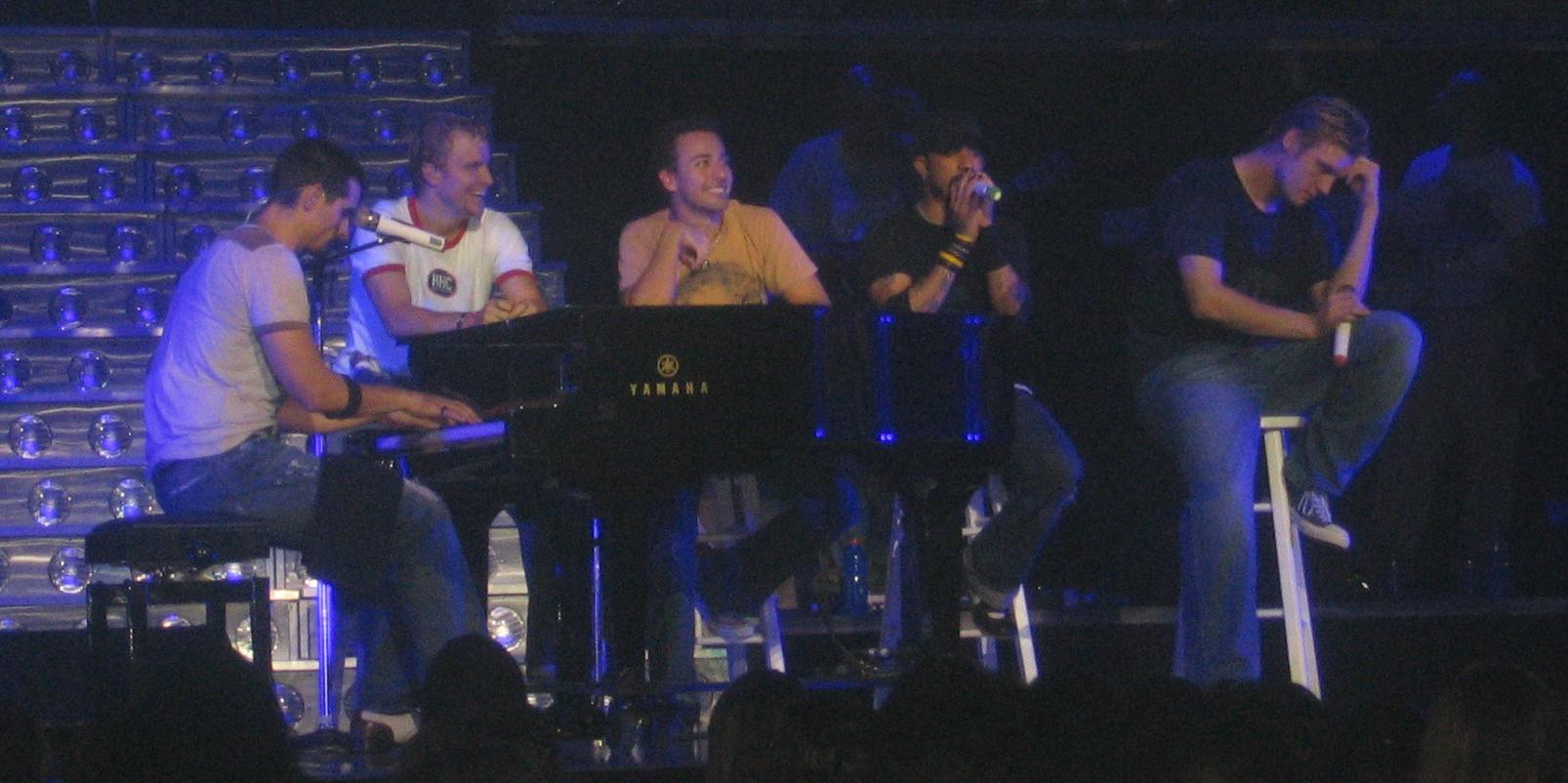
Backstreet Boys sold over 100 million records.

In the early 1990s in North America, with New Kids on the Block's continued success and Color Me Badd also having success, boy bands became a continued staple of the Billboard charts. Continuing this success in the mid-1990s, most prominent boy bands were African American and had R&B and gospel elements, such as the groups All-4-One (formed in 1993) and Boyz II Men (formed in 1988). Boyz II Men are also the most successful boy band act on the U.S. Hot 100. Although they had success on the Billboard charts, they were not marketed towards youth but more towards adults. It was not until 1997 and the change to pop-oriented groups such as Backstreet Boys, 98 Degrees, NSYNC, the Moffatts, and Hanson that boy bands exploded commercially and dominated the market in the United States. This period in the late 1990s marked the height of boy band popularity in North America, which has not been seen since.

Arguably the most successful boy band manager from the U.S. was Lou Pearlman, who founded commercially successful acts such as the Backstreet Boys in 1993, NSYNC and LFO in 1995, O-Town in 2000, and US5 in 2005. Backstreet Boys and NSYNC became the two biggest boy bands in the late 1990s and the early 2000s, and Backstreet Boys went on to become the best-selling boy band in history with over 100 million records sold.

In the late 1990s in the UK, producer Simon Cowell (noted in the U.S. for the American Idol/The X Factor franchise) is also known for having managed British boyband Five (formed in 1997) and Irish boyband Westlife (formed in 1998). Westlife was created by Irishman Louis Walsh as a replacement for Boyzone and was initially managed by a former member of the band Ronan Keating. Westlife would eventually overtake Take That in number one's tally in the UK although Take That's overall UK sales are still higher. In 2012, the Official Charts Company revealed the biggest selling singles artists in British music chart history with Take That placed 15th overall and the highest selling boyband act (9.3 million), followed by Boyzone at 29 (7.1 million) and Westlife at 34 (6.8 million). Even though Cowell is known to have managed several successful boy bands, he is also infamous for passing on signing two of the biggest boybands to emerge from the 1990s and 2000s, Take That and Busted.

=== 2000s: Backstreet Boys, NSYNC, Westlife and Jonas Brothers ===
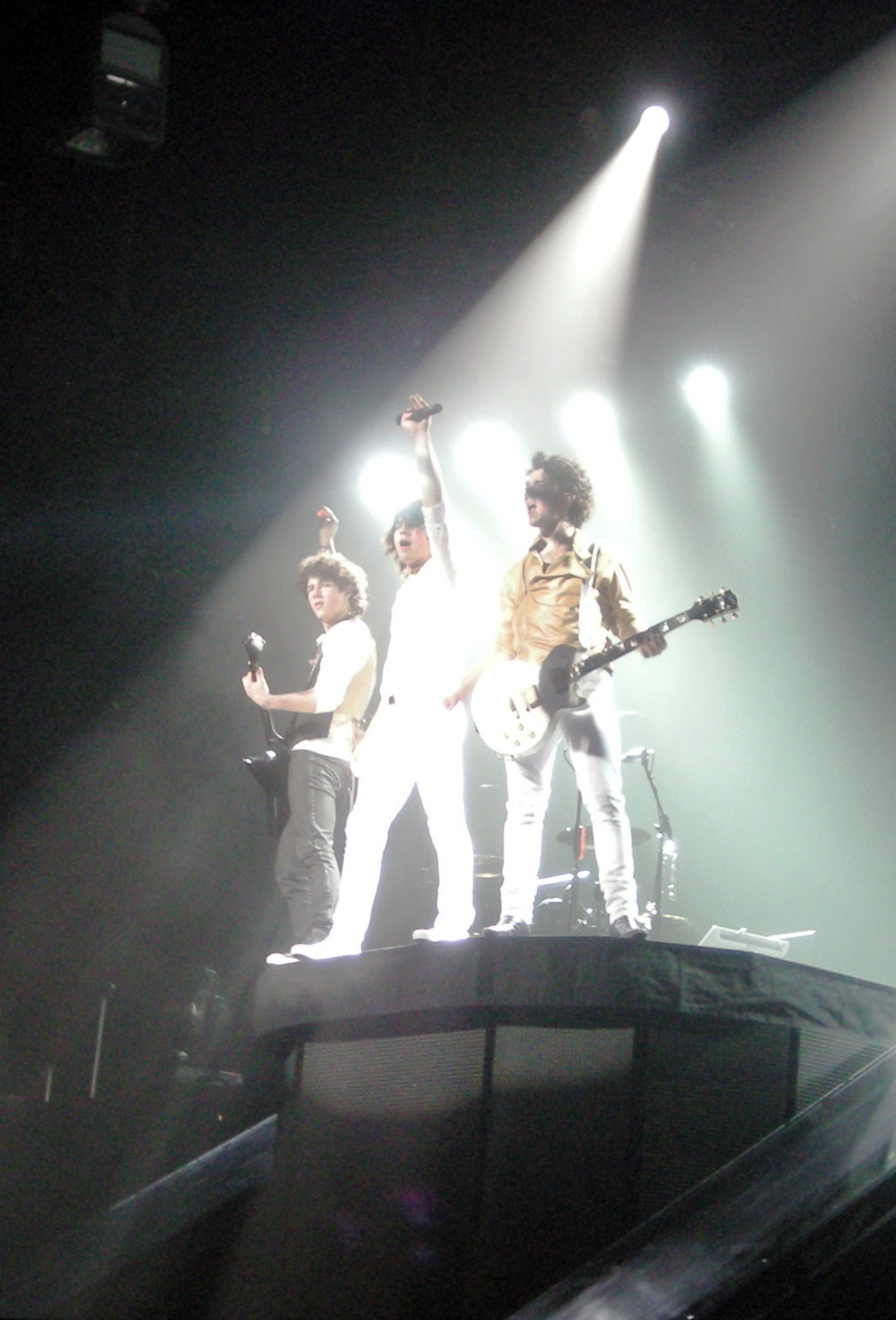
Jonas Brothers are described as a pop boy band.

With the continued success of Backstreet Boys and *NSYNC, American and British groups like 98 Degrees, Westlife, O-Town, A1, Blue, and Busted gained quick popularity both domestically and internationally. International boy bands would also occasionally spring up, such as the Moldovan band O-Zone, and Overground. American Christian boy band Plus One also enjoyed brief remarkable success during this time.

At the height of boy band popularity in North America, MTV created their own parody boyband, 2gether. Like the Monkees in the 1960s, they were a manufactured act composed of actors. 2gether played off of the idea that every successful boy band must have five distinct personality types: the bad boy, the shy one, the young one, the older brother type, and a heart throb.

Since 2001, the dominance of traditional boy bands on pop charts began to fade in the western hemisphere, although Gil Kaufman of MTV has described "new boy bands" that are "more likely to resemble My Chemical Romance, Sum 41, and Simple Plan.

In 2001, Taiwanese boy band F4 (called JVKV since 2007) blew up big as a result of the success of their TV drama Meteor Garden. According to Forbes, F4 has sold 3.5 million copies of their first two albums all over Asia as of July 2003.

With their success, many other Taiwanese boy bands emerged around this time, such as 5566 and Fahrenheit. In South Korea, Shinhwa also spread hallyu wave throughout Asia such as Japan, Thailand, Singapore, Taiwan, Hong Kong and China. Also in 2001, a new all-male pop band and dance group boyband hailing from Japan called Exile debuted under Avex Group's label Rhythm Zone with 14 members, putting them on par with Super Junior, a South Korean boy band, who at the time, had had 13 members at its peak.

Japanese boy band Arashi has sold over 30 million copies of their records since their first release in 1999. They had the yearly best-selling single in Japan in 2008 and 2009. In 2003 SMAP released the single "Sekai ni Hitotsu Dake no Hana" that has become the third best-selling single ever in Japan, with over three million copies sold.

In North America, the Jonas Brothers rose to fame from promotion on the Disney Channel in 2008. Other boy bands like JLS and Mindless Behavior also emerged and experienced remarkable success around this time. However, apart from them, boy bands have not seen the commercial boom experienced in the genre from the mid to late nineties in North America.

The mid 2000s, especially the United Kingdom and the rest of Europe, saw the continued longevity of nineties boy bands such as Backstreet Boys and Westlife (before they disbanded in 2012), and the successful comeback of Take That in 2005, Boyzone in 2007, and New Kids on the Block in 2008. Some sections of the press have referred to these acts, particularly those who have reformed after a previous split, such as Take That, Boyzone, and 98 Degrees, as 'man bands'.

=== 2010s and 2020s: Big Time Rush, One Direction and rise of K-pop ===
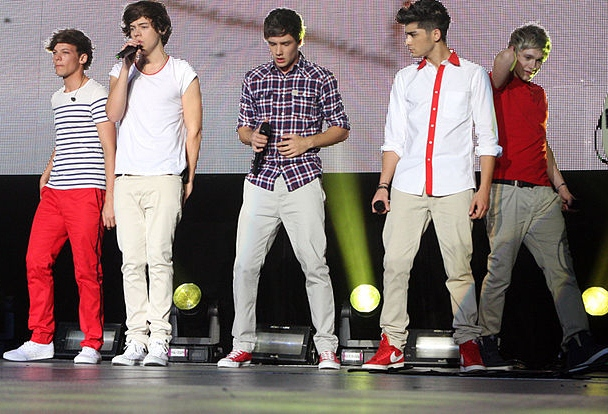
One Direction rose to fame in 2011.

In the early 2010s, there was somewhat of a resurgence of boy band popularity in countries where the trend had not maintained, with the emergence of new boy bands like Big Time Rush, the Wanted, and One Direction and the formation of supergroup NKOTBSB which comprised members of New Kids on the Block and Backstreet Boys. NKOTBSB's success inspired boy bands who were fairly popular during the 1990s and 2000s to make a comeback, such as A1, Blue, 98 Degrees, Five, 911, and O-Town. Like 2gether and the Monkees, Big Time Rush was a manufactured act created for a television show. One Direction were often credited as sparking a resurgence in the popularity and interest boy bands alongside being credited with forming part of a new "British Invasion" in the United States. Their Where We Are Tour was the highest-grossing tour by a vocal group in history and after the release of their fourth album, Four, they became the only group in the 58-year history of the Billboard 200 to have their first four albums debut at number one.

In Southeast Asia, local boy bands also emerged as a result of the continued success of Korean and Japanese boy bands. After the debut of the Philippines supergroup SB19 in 2018, the group appeared at number six on Billboard Year-End Social 50 chart, making them the first Southeast Asian act to reach the top 10 of the magazine's annual chart.

In South Korea, boy bands have been commercially successful. On the Circle Chart year-end albums chart of 2022, 7 of the top 10 and 13 of the top 20 albums are by boy bands or by subunits/members of boy bands. Seventeen's FML is the best-selling album of all time in South Korea, with more than 6.2 million copies sold, and BTS's Love Yourself: Her became the first album released since 2001 to sell more than 1 million copies.

In 2013, Billboard started covering music releases in K-pop, though K-pop had been entering the charts as early as 2009. By 2017, BTS crossed into the international music market, furthering the Korean Wave in the United States and becoming the first Korean group to receive a certification by the Recording Industry Association of America (RIAA) with their single "Mic Drop". The band is the first Korean act to top the U.S. Billboard 200 with their studio album Love Yourself: Tear (2018) and have since hit the top of the U.S. charts with their albums Love Yourself: Answer (2018), Map of the Soul: Persona (2019), Map of the Soul: 7 (2020), Be (2020) and Proof. Love Yourself: Answer also broke South Korea's Gaon Album Chart's all-time monthly record previously set by Love Yourself: Tear and became the first Korean album certified Gold in the United States. SuperM later became the first K-pop group to debut at No. 1 in the U.S. Billboard 200. In 2020, BTS "Dynamite" debuted atop the Billboard Hot 100, making them the first all-South Korean act in Hot 100 history to debut at number one. It garnered the band their first Grammy nomination, for Best Pop Duo/Group Performance at 63rd Annual Grammy Awards, making them the first K-pop act to be nominated for one.

On 12 December 2024, South Korean boy group Stray Kids become the first act ever to debut at No. 1 on the U.S. Billboard 200 chart with their first six charting albums Oddinary (2022), Maxident (2022), 5-Star (2023), Rock-Star (2023), Ate (2024) and Hop (2024).

In Japan, Arashi was the best-selling music artist in Japan from 2013 through 2017 by value of sales and also having the yearly best-selling album in the country in 2010, 2011, 2013, 2015 and 2016. Other successful Japanese boy bands in this decade include Sandaime J Soul Brothers, the second best-selling music artist of 2016 in the country and Kanjani Eight, the fifth best-selling music artist of that year in Japan.

In Norway, the boy band Ballinciaga gained commercial success in 2022 with dance and party songs like "Dans På Bordet" and "Beklager (Guttaklubben)". The group is also known for keeping their identities anonymous by wearing pink-colored masks in the public. Other Norwegian boy bands that gained commercial success in the country in 2020s are Undergrunn and Tigergutt101 in 2022 and 2024 respectively.

Fictional boy bands such as 4*TOWN from Turning Red and Saja Boys from KPop Demon Hunters have gained popularity, charting on the Billboard Hot 100.

With the success of K-pop groups, many western labels have shifted to creating groups modeled after the "K-pop aesthetic". HYBE, a South Korean entertainment company, most notably responsible for BTS' success, teamed up with American label, Geffen. This partnership lead to the creation of Katseye, a global girl group in 2024. This then lead HYBE to create Santos Bravos, a Latin boy band based out of Mexico City. Previously, in early 2024, Q ARE, a Chilean boy band debuted with elements of K-pop and Latin pop sounds. Currently, Q_ARE have become a national and international phenomenon and considered the first Latin K-pop boy band.

== Key factors of the concept ==
Seen as important to a "boy band" group's commercial success is the group's image, carefully controlled by managing all aspects of the group's attire, promotional materials (which are frequently supplied to teen magazines), and music videos. The key factor of a boy band is being trendy. This means that the band conforms to the most recent fashion and musical trends in the popular music scene. Typically, each member of the group will have some distinguishing feature and be portrayed as having a particular personality stereotype, such as "the baby", "the bad boy", or "the shy one". While managing the portrayal of popular musicians is as old as popular music, the particular pigeonholing of band members is a defining characteristic of boy and girl bands. In K-pop, officially designated positions within the group are common, such as "leader", "maknae" (Korean: 막내, English: "the youngest"), "visual", "center" "vocalist", "rapper" and "dancer". The latter three are based on the members' specialized skills and are further divided into "main-", "lead-" and "sub-" (vocalist/rapper/dancer) positions, with the members occupying the "main" positions often being considered the most skilled and having the most parts in songs or being highlighted during solo dance parts. The "leader" is the spokesperson who represents the group in public, and is in charge of mediating between group members, as well as between the group and the label.

In most cases, their music is written, arranged and produced by a producer who works with the band at all times and controls the group's sound – if necessary, to the point of hiring session singers to record guide vocals for each member of the group to sing individually if the members cannot harmonize well together. However, for clarity of each voice, recording each voice individually is most commonly the norm with most modern vocal groups. In recent years, auto-tune has become a popular tool in vocal producing, some boy bands have come under fire for that reason. Some have also come under fire for lip syncing in their performances as well, for example New Kids on the Block.

A typical boy band performance features elaborately choreographed dancing, with the members taking turns singing and/or rapping. Boy bands generally do not compose or produce their own material, unless the members lobby hard enough for creative control. However, some bands were created around the talent of a songwriter within the group like Gary Barlow of Take That or Tony Mortimer of East 17. It is not uncommon to find extra songs on an album written by one or more of the band members; however, their producers rarely use these as singles.

Since the 21st century, however, boy bands have been expected to write or at least contribute in some part lyrically to songs. Apart from the groups mentioned above who all had at least one primary songwriter from their beginning, other groups soon caught up. At the close of the nineties, groups like Backstreet Boys and *NSYNC who had previously used writers like Max Martin during their early albums began writing their own songs. Newer groups from late 2000s such as JLS have all made a point from early interviews that they write their own songs and hold their own image as this is an important part of marketing. Some bands like The Wanted have even spent time learning the craft of songwriting. There has also been a rising trend of so-called "songwriter-" or "producer idols" (Korean: Hangul 작곡돌, rev. Rom. jakgok-dol) in K-pop since the early 2000s. Nowadays, it is not uncommon for groups to have at least one member who is heavily involved in the songwriting and producing of the groups' music. In many cases, these members are the rappers in the group, who have often gained songwriting and producing experience while being active as amateur or underground rappers before joining the group. There is also a higher expectation for rappers to write their own lyrics due to self-expression being a core value of the hip-hop genre. There are cases of "producer idols" writing or producing for other artists outside of their solo or respective group work as well, such as BTS' RM and Suga.

Individuals can also go on to achieve greater success as a solo artist coming out of a boy band having used the groups popularity to build on. Usually this signals the end of the group until potential future reunions. Examples of this include Justin Timberlake from NSYNC, and Robbie Williams from Take That. Some boy band members have gone on to successful careers elsewhere in the media. In K-pop, it is expected and common practice for members to embark on solo endeavors as musical artists or in other entertainment sectors, such as acting, or as variety personalities, alongside their group career after a few years. At the latest, this happens around the time the eldest member reaches the age of 28 (in exceptional cases 30) and is drafted for mandatory military service, forcing the group into a temporary hiatus of at least 18 months. The other members then often go on to pursue solo endeavors and reconvene as a group while no member is serving, or after all members have completed their service.

== Music genres ==
Although most boy bands consist of R&B or pop influences, other music genres, most notably country music and folk music, are also represented. South 65 and Marshall Dyllon, for example, were both country music boy bands. Il Divo, created by Simon Cowell in 2004, are a vocal group that performs operatic pop in several (mainly Italian) languages. Since then operatic/classical boy bands have become quite popular and common, especially in the UK. Since 2001, there has been some crossover with power pop and pop punk from bands that play live instruments. Just recently some boy bands decided to go back to their original doo-wop roots, most notably, The Overtones.

== Controversy ==
Since the 2000s, groups such as Backstreet Boys and LFO have disliked the term "boy band" and have preferred to be known as a "male vocal group". Being categorized among boy bands was also the main reason the Moffatts split up. Boy bands have been accused by the music press of emphasizing the appearance and marketing of the group above the quality of music, deliberately trying to appeal to a preteen audience and for conforming to trends instead of being original. Such criticisms can become extremely scathing. Boy bands are often seen as being short-lived, although some acts such as the Jackson 5, Backstreet Boys, Human Nature, New Edition, SMAP, Shinhwa, Take That and Westlife have sustained lasting careers.

== See also ==
- All-female band
