= Second Avenue (song) =

1974 single by Tim Moore

Single by Tim Moore

from the album Tim Moore
- B-side: "Aviation Man"
- Released: September 1974
- Genre: Easy listening
- Length: 3:51
- Label: Asylum
- Songwriter: Tim Moore
- Producer: Nick Jameson

Tim Moore singles chronology
"A Fool Like You" (1973)	"Second Avenue" (1974)	"Charmer" (1975)

"Second Avenue"

Single by Garfunkel
- B-side: "Woyaya"
- Released: September 1974
- Genre: Easy listening
- Length: 3:59
- Label: Columbia
- Songwriter: Tim Moore
- Producers: Art Garfunkel and Roy Halee

Garfunkel singles chronology
"Traveling Boy" (1974)	"Second Avenue" (1974)	"Break Away" (1975)

“Second Avenue” is a song written by American singer-songwriter Tim Moore. The song was released in 1974 as Moore's second single from his debut LP, concurrently with a version by Art Garfunkel (billed as simply Garfunkel), which received greater notice.

The Garfunkel recording was a non-album single. It peaked at No. 6 on the US Billboard Adult Contemporary chart, No. 34 on the Billboard Hot 100, and also charted in Canada and Australia.

== Chart performance ==
Tim Moore

Chart (1974)	Peak position
Canada RPM Top Singles	60
US Billboard Hot 100	58
US Billboard Adult Contemporary	41
US Cash Box Top 100	59

Garfunkel cover

Chart (1974)	Peak position
Australia (Kent Music Report)	89
Canada RPM Adult Contemporary	32
Canada RPM Top Singles	39
US Adult Contemporary (Billboard)	8
US Billboard Hot 100	34

== Covers ==
- Others who have recorded cover versions of the song include Colin Blunstone (on his 2009 album The Ghost of You and Me).
