= Once Upon a Star =

1975 studio album by the Bay City Rollers

Studio album by Bay City Rollers
- Released: May 1975
- Recorded: 1975
- Studio: Chipping Norton, Oxfordshire
- Genre: Pop
- Length: 37:47
- Label: Bell
- Producer: Phil Wainman

Bay City Rollers chronology
Rollin' (1974)	Once Upon a Star (1975)	Bay City Rollers (1975)

Once Upon a Star is the second studio album by Scottish band, the Bay City Rollers. Released in May 1975, the album features the internationally successful single "Bye Bye Baby", a cover version of The Four Seasons. It reached number one in the UK, Ireland and Australia, and was also a hit in several other music markets across the world. It was number one on the UK Singles Chart for six weeks from March 1975 and ended the year as the UK's top-selling single of 1975.

Originally issued as a non-album single in 1971, "Keep on Dancing" was later included as a track on the album. Once Upon a Star finished the year as the second best selling album in the United Kingdom of 1975, and the fourteenth best selling album of the year in Australia.

== Background ==
The album served as the bands follow up to their commercially successful debut album, Rollin', which was released eight months prior in 1974. They released a cover version of "Bye Bye Baby", originally by The Four Seasons. The single was released in the UK on February 28, 1975, and became the only single to be officially released from the album. It reached number one in the UK, Ireland and Australia, and was also a hit in several other music markets across the world. It was number one on the UK Singles Chart for six weeks from March 1975 and ended the year as the UK's top-selling single of 1975. The Four Seasons' version is quite sparse in instrumental backing, instead carried by the vocals, while the Bay City Rollers' is faster and has a fuller backing sound.

By the time the band began recording their second album, they were now in a position where they wished to be more in control of their sound and were more aware as a band of "what they wanted to do". During this period however, the band had becoming increasingly unhappy and faced other issues including the "physiological manipulation" by their manager Tam Paton as well as an increasing ego problem displayed by their lead singer, Les McKeown.

== Recording ==
During the recording sessions, some within the band feared that the songs they were recording up until that point "had the same beat and feel" as their previous records, with Stuart Wood saying that the band "needed to break out of this mould" if they were to continue their commercial success. Despite the band engaging in songwriting processes together, they still faced a struggle to get their record label, Bell Records, to commit to the band supplying their own compositions to be included on the single releases b-sides. Ultimately, the band were in a position were they felt able to "record anything we wanted", but feared which ever effort they presented to the record label that it would be rejected. The band remained committed to either writing their own songs or at least being able to select which songs to include on the album, and at a point had twelve songs they had written together. One song the band had selected themselves was "Bye, Bye, Baby", a song originally by The Four Seasons. Wood later recalled that their recording of "Bye, Bye, Baby" was "made their own".

The recording sessions for Once Upon a Star took place at an old manor house recording studio in Chipping Norton. Production duties were conducted by Phil Wainman who was more committed to "recording the band" for Once Upon a Star, something the band felt did not happen on their previous album as a result of only recording the album in the studio in a period of four days and the album being assembled whilst they were not present. For the recording sessions, the band felt they had more time than they did for their first album as a result of recording the album at a residential type studio, rather than a studio where they were assigned timed sessions. Wood later claimed that the recording sessions for Once Upon a Star were "perhaps the happiest I have been in the band".

== Release ==
Professional ratings
Review scores
Source	Rating
AllMusic	4/5 stars

Once Upon a Star was released in May 1975 via Bell Records, with Phil Wainman serving as the albums primary producer. The album followed the commercial success the band had experienced with their debut album, debuting at number one in the United Kingdom where it remained for a total of three weeks. It spent a combined total of thirty-seven weeks within the Top 100 of the albums charts in the United Kingdom, and was subsequently certified Platinum by the British Phonographic Industry (BPI) for sales in excess of 300,000 copies. It was the second best selling album of 1975 in the United Kingdom, and the fourteenth best selling album of the year in Australia.

With success looming for the band in the United States, music executive Clive Davis listened to Once Upon a Star and was "astounded at how poor it was". Despite this, Davis had commitment to launching the band in the United States, and instead listened to Rollin, their debut album, and discovered "Saturday Night". He was advised that when originally released in 1973 in the United Kingdom, it struggled commercially, to which Davis advised that it "did not matter" and he was more interested in the song because it was "full of hooks". Davis decided to release "Saturday Night" in the United States in an attempt to launch the bands career, despite their manager Tam Paton claiming the song to be "awful".

With an unfavourable view of Once Upon a Star, Davis decided not to release the album in the United States, deciding to opt for a new album entirely which was essentially a "greatest hits compilation" which included their previous commercially successful singles and only a selection of songs from Once Upon a Star. The self-titled album was released in the United States in November 1975, by which time the band were busy promoting their new single "Give a Little Love" from their third studio album, Wouldn't You Like It?, in the United Kingdom.

A 2004 CD reissue on Bell included five bonus tracks: "All of Me Loves All of You" (1974 single), "The Bump" (B-side), "Keep on Dancing" (1971 single version), "Alright" and "It's for You".

== Track listing ==
1. "Bye Bye Baby" (Bob Crewe, Bob Gaudio) – 2:50
2. "The Disco Kid" (Eric Faulkner, Stuart Wood) – 3:16
3. "La Belle Jeane" (Faulkner, Wood) – 4:01
4. "When Will You Be Mine" (Johnny Goodison, Phil Wainman) – 2:32
5. "Angel Baby" (Faulkner, Wood) – 3:52
6. "Keep on Dancing" (Allen Jones, Willie David Young) – 2:42
7. "Once Upon a Star" (Faulkner, Wood) – 3:00
8. "Let's Go (A Huggin' and a Kissin' in the Moonlight)" (Goodison, Wainman) – 3:28
9. "Marlena" (Faulkner, Les McKeown, Wood) – 3:01
10. "My Teenage Heart" (Faulkner, Wood) – 2:31
11. "Rock & Roll Honeymoon" (Goodison, Wainman) – 2:45
12. "Hey! Beautiful Dreamer" (Faulkner, McKeown, Wood) – 3:49

== Personnel ==
=== Group members ===
- Les McKeown – lead and backing vocals, acoustic and electric guitars
- Eric Faulkner – electric and acoustic guitars, backing vocals, mandolin, violin
- Stuart "Woody" Wood – electric and acoustic guitars, backing vocals, bass, piano
- Alan Longmuir – bass, backing vocals, piano, accordion
- Derek Longmuir – drums, tubular bells, tambourine, sleigh bells, castanets, spoken voice

=== Other personnel ===
- Colin Frechter - musical director, piano and additional backing vocals
- Melvyn Abrahams – engineering
- Barry Hammond – engineering
- John Pasche – cover design
- Nick Ryan – engineering
- Peter Tattersall – engineering
- Phil Wainman – production

== Charts ==
=== Weekly charts ===
Chart (1975)	Peak position
Australian Albums (Kent Music Report)	4
Finnish Albums (Suomen virallinen lista)	3
Japanese Albums (Oricon)	26
New Zealand Albums (RMNZ)	30
Norwegian Albums (VG-lista)	17
Swedish Albums (Sverigetopplistan)	34
UK Albums (OCC)	1
Zimbabwean Albums (ZIMA)	12

=== Year-end charts ===
Chart (1975)	Position
Australian Albums (Kent Music Report)	14
UK Albums (OCC)	2

== Certifications and sales ==
Region	Certification	Certified units/sales
United Kingdom (BPI)	Platinum	300,000^{^}
^{^} Shipments figures based on certification alone.
