= Best Is Yet to Come =

Best Is Yet to Come and variations of the term may refer to:

- "Best Is Yet to Come", a song by Red from Until We Have Faces (2011)
- "Best Is Yet To Come", a song by Gryffin from Alive (2022)

== See also ==
- The Best Is Yet to Come (disambiguation)
