= Money Honey (Bay City Rollers song) =

Single by Bay City Rollers

from the album Rock n' Roll Love Letter
- B-side: "Maryanne"
- Released: November 1975 (UK); February 1976 (US)
- Recorded: 1975
- Genre: Power pop; bubblegum pop
- Length: 3:17
- Label: Arista
- Songwriters: Eric Faulkner, Stuart Wood

Bay City Rollers singles chronology
"Saturday Night" (1976)	"Money Honey" (1975)	"Rock and Roll Love Letter" (1976)

"Money Honey" is the title of a 1975 international hit single by the Bay City Rollers, taken from their album Rock n' Roll Love Letter and in the UK on their album Dedication. The power-pop recording was issued in the US as the album's lead single in January 1976, reaching number nine on the Hot 100 in Billboard magazine that April. "Money Honey" was the Bay City Rollers' second US Top 10 hit. It reached number seven on the Cash Box chart. The follow-up single was the album's title track, "Rock and Roll Love Letter" (US No. 28). In the UK, "Money Honey" was released in November 1975 and reached number three, becoming the group's ninth Top 10 single.

Outside the US, "Money Honey" was yet a bigger hit, such as in Australia (No. 3) and in Ireland (No. 4). The song enjoyed its greatest international popularity in Canada, where it spent one week at number one, and ranks as the 22nd greatest hit of 1976.

== Chart performance ==
=== Weekly charts ===
Chart (1975–1976)	Peak position
Australia (Kent Music Report)	3
Canadian RPM Top Singles	1
Germany	16
Ireland	4
New Zealand	11
Sweden	17
UK Singles Chart	3
US Billboard Hot 100	9
US Cash Box Top 100	7

=== Year-end charts ===
Chart (1976)	Rank
Australia (Kent Music Report)	29
Canada	22
US Billboard	92
US Cash Box	87

== Certifications ==
Region	Certification	Certified units/sales
Canada (Music Canada)	Gold	75,000^{^}
United Kingdom (BPI)	Silver	250,000^{^}
^{^} Shipments figures based on certification alone.

== Track listing ==
1. "Money Honey" - 3:17
2. "Maryanne" - 2:48

== Credits ==
- Photography [Coverphoto] - Arista
