= The Lost Leader (poem) =

1845 poem by Robert Browning

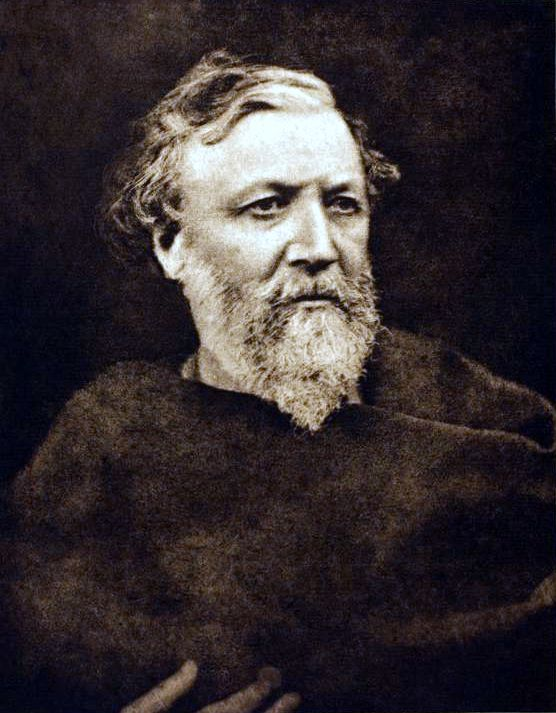
Robert Browning, the poet. Photograph by Julia Margaret Cameron, 1865

"The Lost Leader" is an 1845 poem by Robert Browning first published in his book Dramatic Romances and Lyrics. It berates William Wordsworth for what Browning considered his desertion of the liberal cause, and his lapse from his high idealism. More generally, it is an attack on any liberal leader who has deserted his cause. It is one of Browning's "best known, if not actually best, poems".

== Text ==
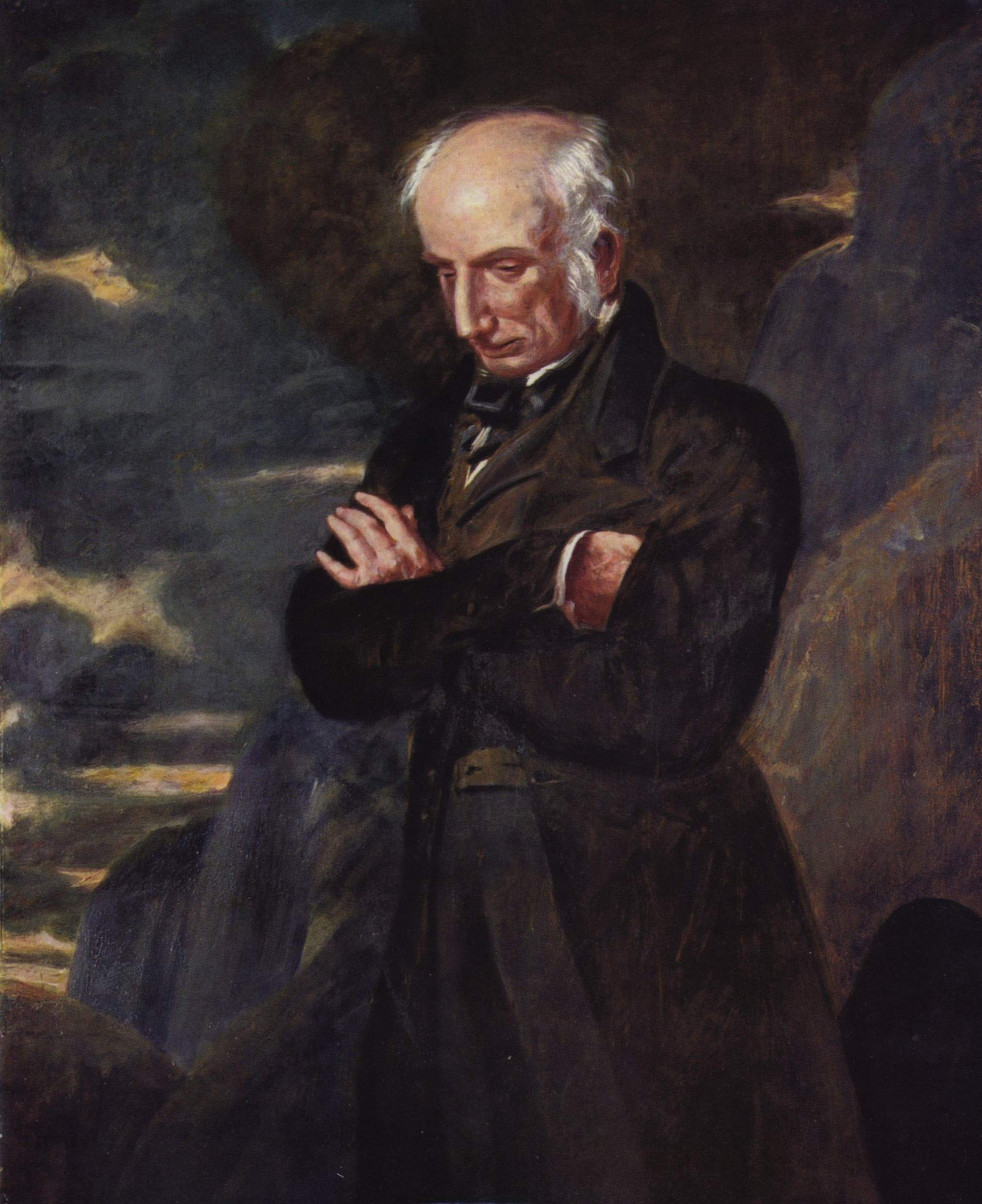
William Wordsworth, the subject of the poem. Portrait by Benjamin Robert Haydon, 1842

Just for a handful of silver he left us,
Just for a riband to stick in his coat—
Found the one gift of which fortune bereft us,
Lost all the others she lets us devote;
They, with the gold to give, doled him out silver,
So much was theirs who so little allowed:
How all our copper had gone for his service!
Rags—were they purple, his heart had been proud!
We that had loved him so, followed him, honoured him,
Lived in his mild and magnificent eye,
Learned his great language, caught his clear accents,
Made him our pattern to live and to die!
Shakespeare was of us, Milton was for us,
Burns, Shelley, were with us,—they watch from their graves!
He alone breaks from the van and the freemen,
—He alone sinks to the rear and the slaves!

We shall march prospering,—not thro' his presence;
Songs may inspirit us,—not from his lyre;
Deeds will be done,—while he boasts his quiescence,
Still bidding crouch whom the rest bade aspire:
Blot out his name, then, record one lost soul more,
One task more declined, one more footpath untrod,
One more devils'-triumph and sorrow for angels,
One wrong more to man, one more insult to God!
Life's night begins: let him never come back to us!
There would be doubt, hesitation and pain,
Forced praise on our part—the glimmer of twilight,
Never glad confident morning again!
Best fight on well, for we taught him—strike gallantly,
Menace our heart ere we master his own;
Then let him receive the new knowledge and wait us,
Pardoned in heaven, the first by the throne!

== Context ==
From an early age, Browning (b. 1812) had been an admirer of the (early) works of Wordsworth (b. 1770). As Baker (2004) observes, Browning had sought to become "Wordsworth's radical successor", and his attitude towards Wordsworth was "a test model of a strong poet's quest for self-definition against an overbearing predecessor". The poem's lines "We that had loved him so, followed him, honoured him, / ... / Made him our pattern to live and to die!" refer to this. However, when he began to perceive Wordsworth sliding into conservative politics and the Church of England, he became increasingly disillusioned. Wordsworth in his early days had been a youthful rebel, defended Paine's Rights of Man and the French Revolution, and been described by Coleridge as a 'semi-atheist', and by himself as a 'patriot of the world'. However, as England went to war against France, the condition in France deteriorated, the Reign of Terror came to be, and Robespierre was executed, Wordsworth became disillusioned, and, following Southey and Coleridge, "gave up his revolutionary dreams and settled down to the life of a recluse".

Browning's poem Sordello, written between 1836 and 1840, was partly aimed as a "correction" of Wordsworth's politics and poetics, but neither the audience nor Wordsworth saw this; instead the poem acquired a reputation for incomprehensibility, and Browning was called "the madman who had foisted the unreadable Sordello upon the world". For his part, Wordsworth seems to have thought very little of Browning, and one of the few recorded statements he made about Browning was in a letter written to a friend on the occasion of Browning's wedding in 1846 to Elizabeth Barrett:

Miss Barrett, I am pleased to learn, is so much recovered as to have taken herself a Husband. Her choice is a very able man, and I trust that it will be a happy union, not doubting that they will speak more intelligibly to each other than, notwithstanding their abilities, they have yet done to the public.

In 1813 Wordsworth obtained the position of distributor of stamps. This government position was already sufficient to induce Shelley to write a sonnet of mild reprimand, "To Wordsworth". In 1842 he accepted a civil list pension of £300 from the government, and in 1843 when Southey died, he accepted the position of Poet Laureate. Browning saw this acquiescence to orthodox tradition—with its image of Wordsworth literally on his knees in front of the queen—as his "final surrender to the forces of conservatism". The poem arose from the resulting hatred and indignation, and was published in November 1845, in Dramatic Romances and Lyrics.

The "handful of silver" is a reference to thirty pieces of silver, a phrase associated with betrayal or selling out. The lines "he boasts his quiescence / Still bidding crouch whom the rest bade aspire" referred to what Browning saw as one of Wordsworth's worst crimes as the lost leader, that of boasting his acquiescence and instructing the oppressed masses to patiently "crouch" and bear their burden instead of rising up in revolt. This Wordsworth had done in his 1833 poem called "The Warning".

Wordsworth died five years later, in 1850. Browning later came to slightly regret the poem, and possibly even to see Wordsworth in a positive light again, as he made a few minor revisions, moderating the poem's attack. However, Baker writes that "His attack on Wordsworth was not as unfair as some have claimed, and as Browning seems to have feared in later life", and Robert Wilson Lynd writes, of Browning's views:

We do not nowadays believe that Wordsworth changed his political opinions in order to be made distributor of stamps [...] Nor did Browning believe this. He did believe, however, that Wordsworth was a turncoat, a renegade—a poet who began as the champion of liberty and ended as its enemy. This is the general view, and it seems to me to be unassailable.

== Reception ==
The poem was widely anthologised, and recognised for its direct attack. One editor wrote:

The Lost Leader was originally written in reference to Wordsworth's abandonment of the Liberal cause, with perhaps a thought of Southey, but it is applicable to any popular apostasy. This is one of those songs that do the work of swords. It shows how easily Mr. Browning, had he so chosen, could have stirred the national feeling with his lyrics.

Another wrote that the verses "have more bad feeling than poetry". Stephen Fry quotes the poem as an example of the use of dactylic metre to great effect, creating verse with "great rhythmic dash and drive". The poem is not in pure dactylic tetrameter, but catalectic.

There was much discussion on whether the poem was addressed to Wordsworth. In response to queries, Browning always made it clear that the poem was based on Wordsworth, but stopped short of saying that it was directly addressed to Wordsworth himself, instead saying that the portrait was "purposely disguised a little, used in short as an artist uses a model, retaining certain characteristic traits, and discarding the rest". Thus the poem was on the Lost Leader in the abstract, with Wordsworth being the most prominent concrete example. In one ambivalent letter, he wrote:

I have been asked the question you now address me with, and as duly answered it, I can't remember how many times; there is no sort of objection to one more assurance or rather confession, on my part, that I did in my hasty youth presume to use the great and venerated personality of Wordsworth as a sort of painter's model; one from which this or the other particular feature may be selected and turned to account; had I intended more, above all, such a boldness as portraying the entire man, I should not have talked about 'handfuls of silver and bits of ribbon'. These never influenced the change of politics in the great poet, whose defection, nevertheless, accompanied as it was by a regular face-about of his special party, was to my juvenile apprehension, and even mature consideration, an event to deplore. But just as in the tapestry on my wall I can recognize features which have struck out a fancy, on occasion, that though truly thus derived, yet would be preposterous as a copy, so, though I dare not deny the original of my little poem, I altogether refuse to have it considered as the 'very effigies' of such a moral and intellectual superiority.

== Literary allusions ==
The Lost Leader was used as the title of a book about Wordsworth by Hugh I'Anson Fausset in 1933.

The Lost Leader is the title of a book of poems by Mick Imlah, published in 2008.

The poem was parodied by Fun (a Victorian competitor of Punch) when the women of Girton College dissolved their Browning Society and spent the funds on chocolate. The lines began: "They just for a handful of chocolate left us / Just for some sweetmeats to put in their throats". In one edition of the poem, the first line had been printed as "Just for a handle of silver he left us", which the proof-reader tried to justify on the grounds that as no one understood Browning, it would be all right.

Nigel Birch attacked the Macmillan government with the words "Never glad confident morning again".

The title of Joe Haines's memoir of the final years of Prime Minister Harold Wilson's government, Glimmers of Twilight, alludes to the poem.

The poem is frequently alluded to by Horace Rumpole.

The lines "We that had loved him so, followed him, honoured him, / ... / Made him our pattern to live and to die!" are framed as the deciding quiz bowl question in Nan Willard Cappo's Cheating Lessons, published in 2002.

An excerpt of the poem is featured in Cassandra Clare's Clockwork Angel published in 2010.

Different approaches to the poem—personal idiosyncratic approaches and those informed by historical context or metrical structure—are discussed as an introduction to "cognitive poetics".

Bhagat Singh, an Indian Marxist Revolutionary and Indian Independence Freedom Fighter used this poem "The Lost Leader", pointing at Lala Lajpat Rai, an Indian Nationalist Freedom Fighter, who turned to communalist politics in his last years.
