= Rock and Roll Love Letter (song) =

- German single picture sleeve

Single by Bay City Rollers

from the album Rock n' Roll Love Letter
- B-side: "Shanghai'd in Love"
- Released: April 1976
- Genre: Power pop
- Length: 2:52
- Label: Arista 0185
- Songwriter: Tim Moore
- Producer: Colin Frechter

Bay City Rollers singles chronology
"Money Honey" (1976)	"Rock and Roll Love Letter" (1976)	"I Only Want to Be with You" (1976)

"Rock and Roll Love Letter" is the second single from American Tim Moore's second album, Behind the Eyes. Tim Moore's original version was not successful. It was later covered by the band Bay City Rollers, and that version became a Top 40 hit.

== Bay City Rollers version ==
This version was released as a single in 1976 and was successful, reaching number 6 in Canada and number 28 in the United States. The single was not released in the UK.

=== Weekly charts ===
Chart (1976)	Peak position
Australia (Kent Music Report)	9
Canada (RPM) Top Singles	6
Germany (Media Control Charts)	13
New Zealand (Recorded Music NZ)	34
U.S. Billboard Hot 100	28
U.S. Cash Box Top 100	30

==== Year-end charts ====
Chart (1976)	Rank
Australia (Kent Music Report)	72
Canada	76
U.S. Joel Whitburn's Pop Annual	169
U.S. Cash Box	97

== Other cover versions ==
- The Dirty Angels covered the song in 1975, released in the U.S. only.
- In 1977, Tina Arena and John Bowles recorded a version for their album Tiny Tina and Little John.
- Pink Lady recorded a Japanese-language version of the song in their 1977 debut album Pepper Keibu.
- The Records covered "Rock and Roll Love Letter" in 1979. It was released in the UK as a non-album single. It was later included as a CD bonus track on their Shades in Bed LP.
- In July 21st, 1988, Eri Nitta recorded a Japanese version of the song as her ninth single.
- Gary Pig Gold along with The Grip Weeds gave "Rock and Roll Love Letter" the full-on Who's Next treatment for the Bullseye Records of Canada Men in Plaid CD in 1999. It was then released in Europe as a non-album single on the Pop The Balloon label.
