= A Fool Like You =

Single by Tim Moore

from the album Tim Moore
- B-side: "Thinking About You"
- Released: April 1973
- Genre: Pop
- Length: 3:31
- Label: ABC/Dunhill
- Songwriter(s): Tim Moore
- Producer(s): Nick Jameson

Tim Moore singles chronology
"A Fool Like You" (1973)	"Second Avenue" (1974)

"A Fool Like You" is a 1973 song by Tim Moore from his eponymous debut album. Donald Fagen is featured on backing vocals. The song reached number 93 on the Billboard Hot 100 during the spring of that year. It was his first of four charting singles in the United States.

== Chart history ==
Chart (1973)	Peak position
U.S. Billboard Hot 100	93
U.S. Cash Box Top 100	94

== Cover versions ==
- "A Fool Like You" was covered by Eric Andersen in 1973 and released as a non-album promotional single.
- Billy J. Kramer covered the song in 1973, which received a European release during the fall of the year.
- The song was covered by Iain Matthews for his 1976 album Go For Broke from which it was issued as the second single.
- Bo Donaldson and The Heywoods recorded the song on their 1976 LP Farther On.
