= Meeting at Night =

Poem written by Robert Browning

- by Robert Browning
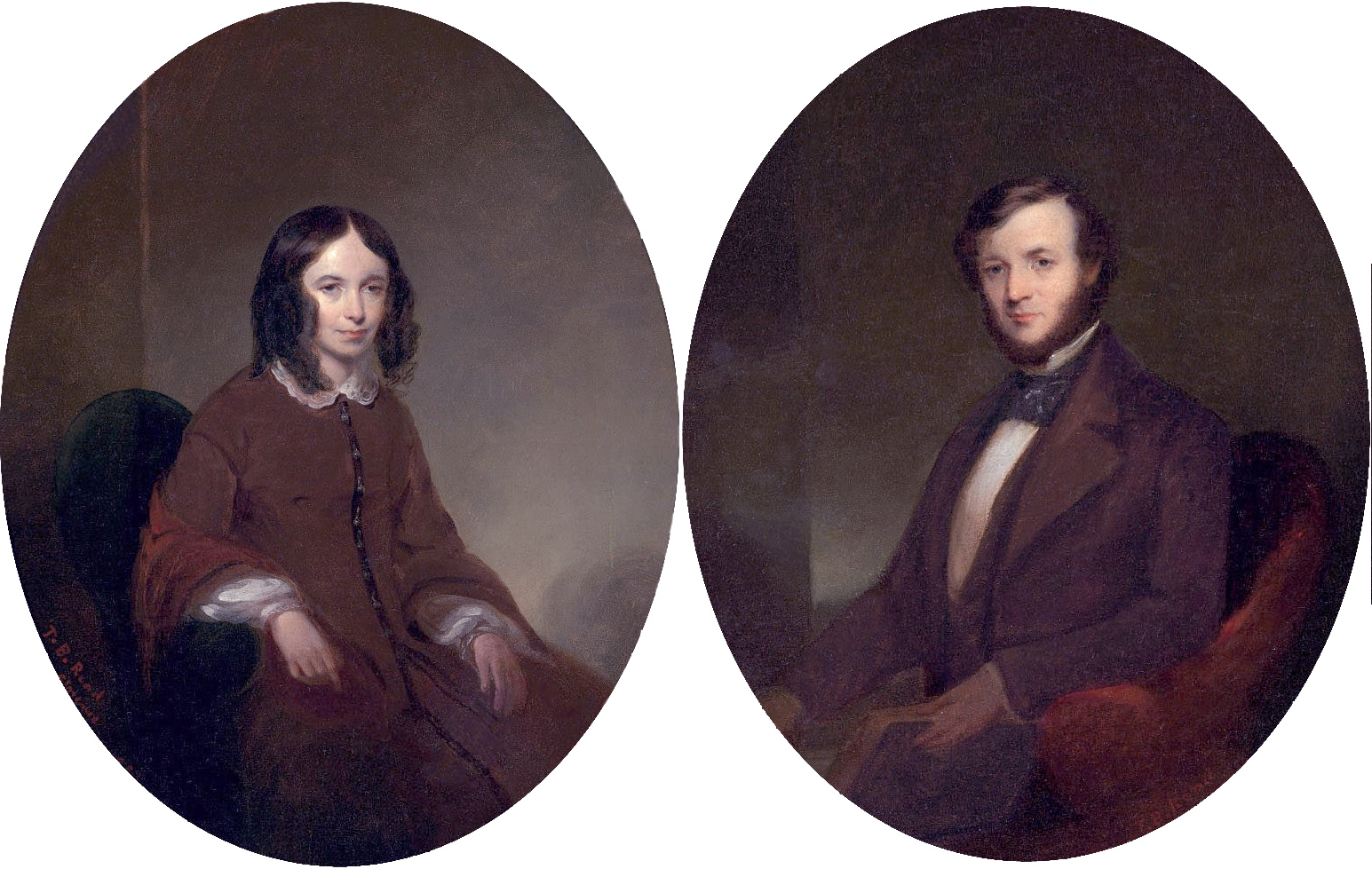
- Elizabeth and Robert Browning in 1853
- Written: 1845
- First published in: Dramatic Romances and Lyrics
- Language: English

Full text
- Meeting at Night at Wikisource

"Meeting at Night" is a Victorian English love poem by Robert Browning. The original poem appeared in Dramatic Romances and Lyrics (1845) in which "Night" and "Morning" were two sections. In 1849, the poet separated them into the two poems "Meeting at Night" and "Parting at Morning". In the poem, the speaker is in urgency to meet his beloved and for this he has to travel through the sea at night to reach the beach where his lover is waiting.

The poem (like others of the 1845 collection) was written during the courtship period of Browning with his future wife Elizabeth Barrett. Kennedy and Hair describe the poem as the "most sensual poem" he had written up to that time.

== Background ==
John Kenyon, a distant cousin of Elizabeth Barrett, presented a copy of Barrett's 1844 poems to Sarianna Browning, sister of Robert Browning. Browning, discovering his name in print in the poem volume, wrote a letter to Barrett on January 10, 1845. Upon getting a reply he sent her the manuscripts of poems and plays of the Dramatic Romances and Lyrics for proofreading.

The poems in Dramatic Romances and Lyrics were arranged in groups of two or three with the two love poems "Night" and "Morning" as complementary. They are described by Kennedy and Hair as "a compact dramatic narrative reflecting a decidedly masculine attitude toward love."

== Themes ==
The poem is written in two stanzas of six lines each. The first stanza describes the excitement of a secret journey by a boat on the sea. The second stanza describes the joy of the meeting of the two lovers. The main theme of this poem is the urgency and desire for the lover to meet the beloved.

Like its sister poem "Parting at Morning" which uses pronominal reference to attribute the gender of the person in the boat (as male), the poem never reveals the identity of the two lovers. It follows the rhyme scheme ABCCBA DEFFED.

== Reception ==
There are two published accounts of this poem: one by F. R. Leavis and another by Ronald Carter and Walter Nash. Kennedy and Hair explain that Browning's urgent love for Elizabeth Barrett had led him to write "the most sensual poem he had yet created."
