= Behind the Eyes (Tim Moore album) =

Studio album by Tim Moore
- Released: 1975
- Genre: Soft rock
- Length: 42:41
- Label: Asylum Records

Tim Moore chronology
Tim Moore (1974)	Behind the Eyes (1975)	White Shadows (1977)

Singles from Behind the Eyes
- 1. "If Somebody Needs It" Released: 1975; 2. "Rock and Roll Love Letter" Released: 1975; 3. "Lay Down a Line to Me" Released: 1975

Professional ratings
Review scores
Source	Rating
Allmusic	3/5 stars

Behind the Eyes is Tim Moore's second full-length album. It was released in 1975 on Asylum Records. It includes the song "Rock and Roll Love Letter", which was covered by Bay City Rollers. The album charted at number 181 on the Billboard 200.

== Track listing ==
No.	Title	Length
1.	"For the Minute"
2.	"Lay Down a Line to Me"
3.	"(I Think I Wanna) Possess You"
4.	"Now I See"
5.	"Rock and Roll Love Letter"
6.	"If Somebody Needs It"
7.	"The Night We First Sailed Away"
8.	"Kaptain Kidd"
9.	"Sweet Navel Lightning"
10.	"Bye Bye Man"
