= Home Thoughts =

Studio album by Clifford T. Ward
- Released: April 1973
- Studio: Sound Techniques, London
- Genre: Folk rock, baroque pop
- Label: Charisma
- Producer: Clifford T. Ward

Clifford T. Ward chronology
Singer Songwriter (1972)	Home Thoughts (1973)	Mantle Pieces (1973)

Singles from Home Thoughts
- 1. "Gaye" Released: 13 April 1973; 2. "Wherewithal" Released: 7 September 1973

Home Thoughts is the second solo album by English singer-songwriter Clifford T. Ward released in 1973. The album reached number 40 in the UK Album Charts in November 1973, helped by the success of the single "Gaye", a top ten hit in July. The title of the album is taken from the poem "Home Thoughts from Abroad" by Robert Browning.

== Background ==
Born in Stourport, Worcestershire, Clifford T. Ward was the fifth child of Kathleen and Frank Ward. His father was a carpet factory worker whose grandparents had been Irish music-hall artistes. In 1962, Clifford became the singer with Cliff Ward and the Cruisers, a proficient beat group that won the 1963 Midland Band of the Year contest in Birmingham. The band performed at American Army bases in France, and it was during this time abroad that Ward wrote "Home Thoughts from Abroad". Between 1966 and 1967, the group released several singles on CBS Records International as The Secrets and Simon's Secrets. The Ward-penned "Path Through the Forest" was recorded by psychedelic rock band The Factory in 1968, and is now considered a classic of the genre. In 1967, Ward enrolled at Worcester teacher training college to study English and divinity, after which he taught at North Bromsgrove High School teaching English and Drama.

In 1970, Ward put together a demo tape and sent it to John Peel, who played it to Clive Selwood. This led to a record deal with Peel and Selwood's label Dandelion. Ward's debut album Singer ∙ Songwriter was released on Dandelion in 1972, but it failed to garner any significant attention. Ward's second album was already half-finished when the label folded later that year. Selwood took it to Tony Stratton Smith and secured Clifford T. Ward a deal with Charisma Records.

== Release and reception ==
Professional ratings
Review scores
Source	Rating
Allmusic	3.5/5 stars

Home Thoughts was well received upon its release. Record Mirror called it "the sort of album that immediately becomes part of your life", commenting "some tracks have a jazz feel, others are folksy, and overall it's a collection of songs you want to hear over and over".

In a retrospective review, Sharon Mawer of Allmusic wrote that the album represented "a breath of fresh air in the overproduced mid-70s... ..here was a man who told simple stories, with beautiful melodies, played with the minimum of fuss". Mawer praised Ward's "love of poetry and words", and concluded "for all the beautiful songs on Home Thoughts, the standout track is the hit single "Gaye" with its instantly memorable singalong melody".

== Track listing ==
All songs written by Clifford T. Ward.

=== Side one ===
1. "Gaye" – 3:40
2. "Wherewithal" – 2:57
3. "The Dubious Circus Company" – 3:20
4. "Nightingale" – 2:23
5. "Where Would That Leave Me" – 2:48
6. "The Traveller" – 5:25

=== Side two ===
7. "Home Thoughts from Abroad" – 3:22
8. "Where's It Going to End" – 3:36
9. "Time, the Magician" – 3:13
10. "Give Me One More Chance" – 3:44
11. "Cold Wind Blowing" – 3:16
12. "The Open University" – 2:24
13. "Crisis" - 2:20

== Personnel ==
- Clifford T. Ward – vocals, keyboards
- Ken Wright – drums, percussion
- Derek Thomas – guitars
- Terry Edwards – bass
- Richard Hewson – arrangements

Technical

- Jerry Boys, Vic Gamm – engineer
- Alan Curtis, Tony Bell – photography

== Charts ==
Chart (1973/74)	Peak position
Australia (Kent Music Report)	67
United Kingdom (Official Charts Company)	40
