= Dramatic Romances and Lyrics =

1845 collection of poems by Robert Browning

Dramatic Romances and Lyrics is a collection of English poems by Robert Browning, first published in 1845 in London, as the seventh volume in a series of self-published books entitled Bells and Pomegranates.

== Contents ==
Many of the original titles given by Browning to the poems in this collection, as with its predecessor Dramatic Lyrics, are different from the ones he later gave them in various editions of his collected works. Since this book was originally self-published in a very small edition, these poems really only came to prominence in the later collections, and so the later titles are given here; see the bottom of the page for a list of the originals.

- "How They Brought the Good News from Ghent to Aix"
- Pictor Ignotus
- The Italian in England
- The Englishman in Italy
- The Lost Leader
- The Lost Mistress
- Home-Thoughts, from Abroad
- Home-Thoughts, from the Sea
- Nationality in Drinks
- The Bishop Orders His Tomb at St. Praxed's Church
- Garden-Fancies:
  - The Flower's Name
  - Sibrandus Schafnaburgensis
- The Laboratory
- The Confessional
- The Flight of the Duchess
- Earth's Immortalities:
  - Fame
  - Love
- Song
- The Boy and the Angel
- Meeting at Night
- Parting at Morning
- Saul
- Time's Revenges
- The Glove

== First Edition Titles ==
- 'How they brought the Good News from Ghent to Aix' (16--)
- Pictor Ignotus (Florence, 15--)
- Italy in England
- England in Italy (Piano di Sorrento)
- The Lost Leader
- The Lost Mistress
- Home-Thoughts, from Abroad
- The Tomb at St. Praxed's (Rome, 15--)
- Garden Fancies
  - I. The Flower's Name
  - II. Sibrandus Schafnaburgensis
- France and Spain
  - I. The Laboratory (Ancien Regime)
  - II. Spain—The Confessional
- The Flight of the Duchess
- Earth's Immortalities
- Song ('Nay but you, who do not love her')
- The Boy and the Angel
- Night and Morning
  - I. Night
  - II. Morning
- Claret and Tokay
  Claret and Tokay here became the first two parts of a longer work, Nationality in Drinks
- Saul (Part I)
- Time's Revenges
- The Glove (Peter Ronsard loquitur)
