= It's a Game (Les McKeown album) =

Studio album by Les McKeown
- Released: 1989
- Recorded: 1988–1989
- Studios: Strongroom Studios (Shoreditch, London)
- Genres: Pop; synth-pop
- Label: Hansa
- Producers: Dieter Bohlen; Luis Rodríguez; Dave Clayton; Jo Dworniak; Les McKeown

Singles from It's a Game
- 1. "Love Is Just a Breath Away" Released: 1988; 2. "She's a Lady" Released: 1988; 3. "It's a Game" Released: 1989; 4. "Love Hurts and Love Heals" Released: 1989

It's a Game is a studio album by the Scottish pop singer Les McKeown, released in 1989 with four corresponding singles released. Each of these four singles charted on the German charts. "She's a Lady" peaked at No. 38 in June 1988, "Love Is Just a Breath Away" peaked at No. 44 in December 1988,, "It's a Game" peaked at No. 33 in May 1989,, and "Love Hurts and Love Heals" peaked at No. 47 in July 1989. After the album, Dieter Bohlen released a cover of Blue System's song "Nobody Makes Me Crazy (Like You Do)" as a single, which did not appear on the album.

== Track listing ==
Side one

1. "It's a Game" (Long Version) – 5:30
2. "Love Is Just a Breath Away" – 3:46
3. "She's a Lady" (Scotch Long Version) – 4:22
4. "Love Hurts and Love Heals" (Long Version) – 5:05

Side two

5. "Looking for Love" – 4:55
6. "Natural Lover" – 4:40
7. "I Need Your Love" – 4:17
8. "I'll Be Your Lover" – 6:11

== Personnel ==
Credits are adapted from the It's a Game liner notes.

- Producer, Arranged By — Dieter Bohlen (tracks: 1 to 4)
- Backing Vocals — Ann Turner, Gloria Robakowski
- Co-producer — Luis Rodríguez (tracks: 1 to 4)
- Engineer, Producer — Jo Dworniak (tracks: 5 to 8)
- Guitar — Paul Dunnie
- Keyboards, Producer, Programmed By — Dave Clayton (tracks: 5 to 8)
- Percussion — Danny Cummings
- Photography — Martin Becker
- Producer — Les McKeown (tracks: 5 to 8)
- Technician [Percussion Assistant] — Richard Bowling
