= Give a Little Love (Bay City Rollers song) =

1975 single by Bay City Rollers

- Cover of German single

Single by Bay City Rollers

from the album Wouldn't You Like It?
- B-side: "She'll Be Crying over You"
- Released: July 1975
- Recorded: 1975
- Genre: Pop
- Length: 3:29
- Label: Bell
- Songwriter(s): Johnny Goodison; Phil Wainman
- Producer(s): Phil Wainman

Bay City Rollers singles chronology
"Bye Bye Baby" (1975)	"Give a Little Love" (1975)	"Don't Stop the Music" (1975)

"Give a Little Love" is a song by the Scottish boy band Bay City Rollers. It was written by Johnny Goodison and Phil Wainman, and produced by Wainman. "Give a Little Love" was released in July 1975 as the only single from the Bay City Rollers third studio album, Wouldn't You Like It? It spent three weeks at number one on the UK singles chart, becoming the group's second and final UK number-one single, and was the sixth-biggest selling single of 1975 in the UK.

Unlike the single version, the original UK album version was augmented with a string section, while the US-only Bay City Rollers album had only the basic rhythm track and no strings. However, the song was not released as a single in the United States.

== Charts ==
=== Weekly charts ===
Chart (1975)	Peak position
Australia (Kent Music Report)	2
Ireland (IRMA)	1
Norway (VG-lista)	4
Sweden (Sverigetopplistan)	11
UK Singles (OCC)	1
West Germany (GfK)	11

=== Year-end charts ===
Chart (1975)	Position
Australia (Kent Music Report)	29
UK Singles (British Market Research Bureau)	6

== Certifications ==
Region	Certification	Certified units/sales
United Kingdom (BPI)	Gold	500,000^{^}
^{^} Shipments figures based on certification alone.
