= Clifford T. Ward =

British singer-songwriter (1944–2001)

Background information
- Born: Clifford Thomas Ward; 10 February 1944; Stourport-on-Severn, Worcestershire, England
- Died: 18 December 2001 (aged 57) Tenbury Wells, Worcestershire, England
- Genres: Folk rock, baroque pop
- Occupation: Singer-songwriter
- Years active: 1962–2001
- Website: Home Thoughts (official website)

Clifford Thomas Ward (10 February 1944 – 18 December 2001) was an English singer-songwriter, best known for his career as a solo artist. Ward's 1973 album Home Thoughts remains his best known recording and he had hit singles with "Gaye" and "Scullery". His reluctance to tour in support of recorded work may have affected his chances of more substantial mainstream success.

== Early life ==
Born in Stourport-on-Severn, Worcestershire, Ward was the fifth child of Kathleen and Frank Ward, a carpet factory worker whose grandparents had been Irish music-hall artistes. Ward had one older sister and three older brothers, and as children, he and his siblings picked fruit on a local farm to supplement the family income. He was educated at Stourport secondary modern school and King Charles I Grammar School in Kidderminster. At school he spent some time as a choir boy. He met his future wife, Pat, at school when they were teenagers. They later married after Pat became pregnant with the first of their four children.

They initially lived in Castle Road, then Stourbridge Road, in Kidderminster, for several years and both were active in raising funds for cerebral palsy, a condition their daughter Debbie had from birth. He was also an English teacher for about a year and a half at North Bromsgrove High School.

== Early career ==
In 1962, shortly after leaving school and supporting himself with a series of clerical jobs, Ward formed a beat band Cliff Ward and the Cruisers, which won the 1963 Midland Band of the Year contest in Birmingham. The band was popular in Birmingham and also in demand at American Army bases in France. It was during this time abroad that Ward wrote "Home Thoughts from Abroad" (a song that would later appear on his second solo album and also as the B-side of "Gaye"). In the mid-1960s and after several member changes, the group was renamed Martin Raynor and The Secrets, with Ward in the role of the elusive Raynor. The fictitious name was soon dropped and the band continued on as Raynor's Secrets and as Simon's Secrets, and went on to tour around Britain and France, achieving moderate success. Along the way, six singles were recorded by the group (ten of the songs penned by Ward himself), though these made little impact.

== Solo career ==
In 1967, following the demise of The Secrets, Ward decided he needed to get "a real job". He enrolled at Worcester Teacher Training College and subsequently taught at North Bromsgrove High School teaching English and Drama. One of his pupils was the future wife of Sting, Trudie Styler, and another was Underworld singer Karl Hyde. The children heard singing on Ward's early albums were from North Bromsgrove High School.

In his spare time, he continued songwriting and recorded his first solo album Singer Songwriter, released in 1972 on Dandelion Records (a label formed by the disc jockey John Peel) just before it went into liquidation. As a result, the album received little media coverage and went largely unnoticed. Signing a new recording contract with Charisma Records, Ward went on to have a hit with the single "Gaye". It sold over a million copies worldwide and reached number 8 in the UK Singles Chart in July 1973.

In July 1973, following the success of "Gaye", Ward's second album Home Thoughts achieved healthy sales and reached number 40 in the UK Albums Chart. At this point, he gave up the teaching profession to concentrate on music full-time. He made a rare public appearance in July, performing "Gaye" on Top of the Pops. According to Allmusic, the song "Wherewithal" from the Home Thoughts album is "infectious and lyrically excellent" and it was surprising that it failed to chart. In January 1974, Ward entered the UK singles chart again at number 37 with "Scullery", a track from his third album Mantle Pieces.

Subsequent singles including "No More Rock 'n' Roll", "Jigsaw Girl", "Ocean of Love" and "I Got Lost Tonight" (written by the US singer-songwriter Tim Moore, one of the very rare occasions when he recorded outside material) were given airtime by BBC Radio presenters, but Ward never made it into the UK singles chart again. In the late 1970s, Justin de Villeneuve became his manager. It was said that he would have had more commercial success were it not for his dislike of touring, public appearances, interviews and photo shoots. Ward's manager in the early 1970s, Clive Selwood, said that Ward's lack of touring contributed to his limited commercial success, stating: "Clifford should have been a major, major star – he had hits, but he simply wouldn't perform publicly."

"The Best is Yet to Come", from the album Both of Us, enjoyed success when covered by Justin Hayward, and his songs have been recorded by Cliff Richard, Jack Jones, Art Garfunkel, Judy Collins and more recently by Brian Kennedy and Rumer.

== Illness ==
In 1987, Ward was diagnosed with multiple sclerosis (MS). He continued to record and write songs while living at home, cared for by his wife, Pat. In 1994, Ward was interviewed by a local newspaper, the Wolverhampton Express & Star. He told reporter Aidan Goldstraw: "I have not and will not come to terms with this illness. There are times — usually quite late at night — when I'm almost normal again. But unless they find a cure for this dreadful MS, then I don't see a future".

Ward recorded his eleventh and what would be his final album, Julia and Other New Stories, crawling on all fours into his home-based recording studio to finish it. At around the same time, a stage musical, Shattered World, was produced as a tribute to him, based on his life and his battle against MS. Half of the songs were Ward's own, and half were numbers written by others about him.

== Death ==
In November 2001, Ward contracted pneumonia and died in Tenbury Community Hospital a few weeks later on 18 December 2001.

== Discography ==
=== Albums ===
Title	Label	Original release date
Singer-Songwriter	Dandelion Records	September 1972
Home Thoughts	Charisma Records	June 1973
Mantle Pieces	Charisma Records	December 1973
Escalator	Charisma Records	April 1975
No More Rock 'n' Roll	Philips	December 1975
Waves	Philips	November 1976
New England Days	Mercury	October 1977
Both of Us	Philips	March 1984
Sometime Next Year	Tembo Records	July 1986
Gaye and Other Stories	Virgin Records	October 1990
Laugh It Off	Ameless Records	February 1992
Julia and Other New Stories (demos and out-takes)	Graduate Records	February 1995
Hidden Treasures	RP Media	August 1998
Bittersweet	RP Media	May 1999
The Ways of Love	RP Media	May 2000
Anthology	Cherry Red Records	June 2002
This Was Our Love	Cherry Red Records	May 2003
Work in Progress	The Friends of Clifford T. Ward	October 2003
Secrets & Sidetracks	The Friends of Clifford T. Ward	2004
Studio Sessions (limited edition)	Cherry Red Records	September 2005
Change of Heart	Cherry Red Records	September 2009
The Kinver Sessions 1968-1972	Beaujangle	2009
Path Through the Forest - The Secret World of Clifford T. Ward	Wooden Hill	2009
The Best Is Yet to Come: The Collection	Press Play/Cherry Red Records	2013
Infatuation: Singles and Demos 1966-68 - The Secrets ft. Clifford T. Ward	Grapefruit Records	2015

=== Singles (partial list) ===
Title	Label	Year
Gaye / Home Thoughts from Abroad	Charisma	1973
Wherewithal / Thinking of Something to do	Charisma	1973
Scullery /	Charisma	1973
Jig-Saw Girl / Cellophane	Charisma	1975
No More Rock & Roll / Gandalf	Philips	1975

=== TV appearances ===
Show	Channel	Song(s)	Date
Top of the Pops	BBC1	"Gaye"	13 July 1973
Top of the Pops	BBC1	"Gaye"	27 July 1973
Russel Harty Plus	LWT	"Gaye"	12 August 1973
Hits a Go Go	SRG (Switzerland)	"Gaye"	6 October 1973
The Old Grey Whistle Test	BBC2	"Scullery", "All Modern Conveniences"	20 November 1973
Top of the Pops	BBC1	"Scullery"	20 December 1973
Rock On with 45	Granada	"Jayne (from Andromeda Spiral)" + 1	3 October 1974
Songs of Searching	BBC2	"Home Thoughts from Abroad", "Escalator", "For Debbie & Her Friends", "Ocean of Love"	17 October 1976
Get It Together	Granada	"Someone I Know"	14 February 1978
Pebble Mill at One	BBC1	"Contrary"	1981
The Castlebar Song Contest	RTÉ	"Gaye", "Up in the World", "Home Thoughts from Abroad"	1982
The Late Late Show	RTÉ	"Watchin' the T.V News"	1983
Live at 3	RTÉ	"The Best is Yet to Come & Gaye"	1982

== Bibliography ==
- Bittersweet: The Clifford T. Ward Story, Dave Cartwright – Moonicorn Books (1999) ISBN 0-953538-80-X – Cherry Red (2003) ISBN 1-901447-18-9
- Clifford T. Ward: Complete Recordings Illustrated, A.P Sparke - APS Publications (2019) ISBN 1-912309-19-X

== DVD ==
- Oh and By the Way - The Clifford T. Ward Story - Shotwize Motion Picture co. (2020)
