= Wouldn't You Like It? =

1975 studio album by Bay City Rollers

Studio album by Bay City Rollers
- Released: December 1975
- Recorded: 1975
- Studio: Chipping Norton, Oxfordshire
- Genre: Glam rock
- Length: 38:05
- Label: Bell
- Producer: Phil Wainman

Bay City Rollers chronology
Bay City Rollers (1975)	Wouldn't You Like It? (1975)	Rock N'Roll Love Letter (1976)

Professional ratings
Review scores
Source	Rating
Allmusic	2.5/5 stars

Wouldn't You Like It? is the third studio album by the Scottish pop rock group Bay City Rollers. The LP, issued in the UK in late 1975, saw a marked change in the group's musical direction: all the songs save one were the band's own compositions. The one outside-written tune, "Give a Little Love", was a smash UK hit, and the only single released from the album. The album also included, in the form of a giant letter, a free colour picture book of the individual members, with a band picture on the front.

Seven of the tracks from the album would appear on Arista Records' 1976 US-only album, Rock N'Roll Love Letter using the same cover photo and artwork.

== Track listing ==
=== UK LP release, Bell Records #8002 ===
All tracks are written by Eric Faulkner and Stuart "Woody" Wood except where noted.

Side one
No.	Title	Lead vocals	Length
1.	"I Only Wanna Dance With You"	Les McKeown	2:59
2.	"Don't Stop the Music"	McKeown	2:49
3.	"Shanghai'd in Love"	Faulkner, Wood	3:29
4.	"Love Is..."	McKeown	2:38
5.	"Maybe I'm a Fool to Love You"	McKeown	3:55
6.	"Too Young to Rock & Roll"	McKeown	2:17

Side two
No.	Title	Lead vocals	Length
1.	"Give a Little Love" (John Goodison/Phil Wainman)	McKeown	3:28
2.	"Wouldn't You Like It?"	McKeown	3:14
3.	"Here Comes That Feeling Again"	Alan Longmuir	3:41
4.	"Lovely to See You"	McKeown	3:57
5.	"Eagles Fly"	McKeown	3:04
6.	"Derek's End Piece"	Instrumental, Spoken Outro: Derek Longmuir	2:34

Track listing per Discogs

== 2004 UK CD reissue ==
A 2004 CD reissue on Bell included four bonus tracks: "Saturday Night", which had appeared on Japanese pressings of the original LP; "She'll Be Crying Over You" (originally the B-side of the UK "Give a Little Love" single); and two previously unissued tracks featuring early Roller Nobby Clark on lead vocal: "Wouldn't You Like It? (1972 version)" (an entirely different song from 1975's "Wouldn't You Like It?") and "I'd Do It Again".

== Charts ==
=== Weekly charts ===
Chart (1975)	Peak position
Australian Albums (Kent Music Report)	3
Finnish Albums (Suomen virallinen lista)	3
German Albums (Offizielle Top 100)	30
Japanese Albums (Oricon)	21
New Zealand Albums (RMNZ)	5
Norwegian Albums (VG-lista)	9
Swedish Albums (Sverigetopplistan)	45
Swiss Albums (Schweizer Hitparade)	13
UK Albums (OCC)	3

=== Year-end charts ===
Chart (1976)	Position
New Zealand Albums (RMNZ)	25

== Personnel ==
- Les McKeown – lead and backing vocals
- Stuart "Woody" Wood – guitars, backing vocals; co-lead vocals on "Shangai'd In Love"
- Eric Faulkner – guitars, backing vocals; co-lead vocals on "Shangai'd In Love"
- Alan Longmuir – bass, backing vocals; lead vocals on "Here Comes That Feeling Again"
- Derek Longmuir – drums, backing vocals, percussion; spoken word on "Derek's End Piece"

== Production ==
Recorded at:

- Chipping Norton Studios – Engineered by Dave Grinstead
- Eden Studios, Chiswick – Engineered by Mike Gardener
- Audio International Studios – Engineered by James Guthrie
- Mastered at IBC Studios, London by Melvin Abrams
- Musical Director – Colin Frechter
- Produced by Phil Wainman
- Sleeve design: The Green Bay Packers Art Company
- Cover Photography: John Paul
- Insert Photography: Alan Ballard
- Art Director: John Dyer
