= The Best Is Yet to Come (Clifford T. Ward song) =

"The Best Is Yet To Come" is a song by Clifford T. Ward, first released as a single on WEA in 1981, and subsequently released by Philips on his 1983 album Both of Us (re-released by Cherry Red on CD in 2003). It has been covered by numerous other artists, including Justin Hayward, Dana, Patty Weaver, and Judy Collins.
