= Tim Moore (singer-songwriter) =

American singer-songwriter (born 1949)

- Born: December 31, 1949 (age 76); New York, New York, U.S.
- Genres: Pop; rock
- Occupations: Singer; songwriter
- Years active: 1975–2019
- Labels: Asylum; Polydor; Charisma

Tim Moore (December 31, 1949) is an American pop singer and songwriter who recorded four albums for Asylum Records in the 1970s. Moore's songs were praised by critics and admired by a diverse range of peers including Keith Richards, Jimmy Webb, James Taylor and Michael McDonald.

== Career ==
=== Early bands ===
A self-taught musician, Moore grew up in Philadelphia, where he went to art school and played his early songs at local coffee houses. His rock career began with DC & the Senators opening arena rock concerts in Philadelphia. He played drums with Woody's Truck Stop, the first band to feature Todd Rundgren. He and a friend started the Muffins, the first group to record and perform Tim Moore pop songs. The Muffins had minor success on RCA Records with the single "Subway Traveler". During its year of existence, the band did one week residencies at the Trauma, a psychedelic club in Philadelphia, with acts like the Velvet Underground.

After the Muffins disbanded, Frank Zappa heard Moore play solo and considered his songs harmonically advanced for the time. Zappa brought Moore to New York with the intention of signing him to his label, Bizarre Records. Moore declined the offer when Zappa couldn't schedule time to produce the album himself. Moore returned to Philadelphia and worked as a staff writer and studio musician on sessions with Thom Bell, Gamble and Huff, and other producers of Philadelphia soul. He lived next door to singer Daryl Hall in downtown Philadelphia, where they worked together as staff writers for a production company. Moore and Hall co-founded a new band, Gulliver, who released one album for Elektra Records.

=== Solo career ===
After the breakup of Gulliver, Moore sought a more personal approach to his music. He moved to Woodstock, New York, the residence of Bob Dylan, The Band, and Van Morrison. He signed with Dunhill Records, and sang backup on the first Steely Dan single, "Dallas" (1972). In return, Donald Fagen of Steely Dan sang backup on Moore's first single, "A Fool Like You".

Moore's self titled debut solo album was first released in May 1974 by a label called A Small Record Company. It was distributed by Paramount and its parent company Famous Music Corp. It was produced by Nick Jameson, who recognized Moore's multi-instrumental talents and encouraged him to assemble his own tracks. Moore layered guitar, keyboard, and bass parts over drum tracks by Bernard Purdie, and Russ Kunkel. The debut single "Second Avenue" charted in the US, Canada, and UK, but as it was headed up the US charts, Famous Music closed its record operations.

When record label chiefs Clive Davis and David Geffen heard that Moore was a free agent, a bidding war ensued. Moore chose to sign with Geffen's Asylum Records. Meanwhile, Art Garfunkel released a recording of Second Avenue. Garfunkel's version peaked at No. 34 on the Billboard magazine Hot 100 chart, number six Adult Contemporary, and No. 39 in Canada, while Moore's original peaked at No. 58 after re-release. Moore's version made a brief re-appearance of the Canadian charts in early 1978, reaching number 92.

During 1975, Moore released the album Behind the Eyes. This featured what remains his best-known song, "Rock and Roll Love Letter". The song was a hit when re-recorded by the Bay City Rollers a year later. Moore's guitar playing on this song caught the attention of Keith Richards, guitarist for the Rolling Stones. They became friends and Moore spent two weeks in rehearsals with the Rolling Stones and Peter Tosh at Bearsville Studios in Woodstock.

Moore's third album, White Shadows, was recorded in Los Angeles with more polished production and a group of seasoned musicians, including Michael McDonald of the Doobie Brothers, Jeff Porcaro of Toto, Timothy B. Schmit of the Eagles, and Bill Payne of Little Feat. The album was followed by High Contrast, produced by Ken Scott, who had worked with The Beatles, David Bowie, Devo and Supertramp.

Singers continued to mine his new releases for songs but Moore's records received limited attention in the United States. In 1986, Moore released his fifth album, Flash Forward. He spent 75 days touring Brazil after "Yes," a ballad from that album, went to No. 1 and stayed there for ten weeks. In 1988 he replaced Jim Gilmour in Saga for the Wildest Dreams tour.

=== Recent activity ===
As of 2019, Moore continues to write songs and plans new recording projects and live dates through 2020. In 2016, he was the music director for an all-star tribute to Lou Reed for the 50th anniversary of Max's Kansas City.

== Other versions of Tim Moore songs ==
- "Aviation Man": Jimmy Witherspoon
- "Charmer": Etta James
- "A Fool Like You": Eric Andersen and Iain Matthews
- "I Can Almost See The Light": Colin Blunstone.
- "I Got Lost Tonight": Clifford T. Ward
- "It Ain't Over 'til It's Over": Richie Havens
- "I Think I Want to Possess You": Maxine Nightingale
- "Love Enough": Cher, Siobhan Crawley, Paul Jones, Maxine Nightingale, and Cliff Richard
- "Rock and Roll Love Letter": the Bay City Rollers and The Records
- "Second Avenue": Art Garfunkel and Colin Blunstone
- "That's the Way I See You": Richie Havens
- "When You Close Your Eyes": Colin Blunstone and Nigel Olsson
- "Yes": Ritchie Havens

== Album discography ==
- Tim Moore (A Small Record Company, 1974)
- Tim Moore (Asylum, 1974, re-issue)
- Behind the Eyes (Asylum, 1975)
- White Shadows (Asylum, 1977)
- High Contrast (Asylum, 1979)
- Flash Forward (Elektra, 1985)

== Singles discography ==
- "A Fool Like You" (Dunhill/ABC, 1973) -- U.S. #93
- "Second Avenue" (Asylum, 1974) -- U.S. #58; AC #41; CAN #60
- "Charmer" (Asylum, 1975) -- U.S. #91
- "Rock and Roll Love Letter" (Asylum, 1975)
- "In the Middle" (Asylum, 1977) -- U.S. #75; CAN #89
- "Yes" (Top Tape, 1986) -- Brazil, (Vidisco, 1986 ) -- Portugal #1
