= Bay City Rollers (album) =

1975 album by the Bay City Rollers

Compilation album by Bay City Rollers
- Released: September 1975
- Recorded: 1973–1975
- Genre: Bubblegum
- Label: Arista
- Producers: Phil Coulter; Bill Martin; Phil Wainman

Bay City Rollers chronology
Once Upon a Star (1975)	Bay City Rollers (1975)	Wouldn't You Like It (1975)

Professional ratings
Review scores
Source	Rating
AllMusic	3/5 stars
Christgau's Record Guide	C
The Rolling Stone Record Guide	1/5 stars

Bay City Rollers is a compilation album released by Scottish band the Bay City Rollers. It was released exclusively in North America to launch the band's career. The compilation, which hit No. 1 on the RPM Canadian album chart on 7 February 1976 and reached as high as No. 20 on the US album chart, included the US and Canadian number-one single "Saturday Night".

The LP contained tracks culled mostly from the band's first three UK-only albums: five songs from Rollin', four songs from Once Upon a Star and one song from Wouldn't You Like It? – along with one new song. In addition, this album contains the US mix of "Summerlove Sensation" (a fuller mix with strings), which later became available on CD on the US release Definitive Collection.

== Track listing ==
1. "Give a Little Love" (Johnny Goodison, Phil Wainman)
2. "Bye Bye Baby" (Bob Crewe, Bob Gaudio)
3. "Shang-a-Lang" (Bill Martin, Phil Coulter)
4. "Marlina" (Eric Faulkner, Les McKeown, Stuart Wood)
5. "Let's Go (A Huggin' and a Kissin' in the Moonlight)" (Goodison, Wainman)
6. "Be My Baby" (Jeff Barry, Ellie Greenwich, Phil Spector)
7. "Summerlove Sensation" (Martin, Coulter)
8. "Remember (Sha-La-La-La)" (Martin, Coulter)
9. "Saturday Night" (Martin, Coulter)
10. "My Teenage Heart" (Faulkner, Wood)
11. "Keep on Dancing" (Allen Jones, Willie David Young)

== Charts ==
=== Weekly charts ===
Chart (1975–1976)	Peak position
Canada Top Albums/CDs (RPM)	1
New Zealand Albums (RMNZ)	4
Swedish Albums (Sverigetopplistan)	49
US Billboard 200	20

=== Year-end charts ===
Chart (1976)	Position
Canada Top Albums/CDs (RPM)	4
New Zealand Albums (RMNZ)	20
US Billboard 200	65

== Personnel ==
- Eric Faulkner – guitar
- Alan Longmuir – bass guitar
- Derek Longmuir – drums
- Les McKeown – lead vocals
- Stuart "Woody" Wood – guitar
