= Bye, Bye, Baby (Baby Goodbye) =

1965 single by The Four Seasons

"Bye Bye Baby (Baby, Goodbye)"

Single by The Four Seasons

from the album The Four Seasons Entertain You
- B-side: "Searching Wind (from the album Born To Wander)"
- Released: 1965
- Length: 2:32
- Label: Philips
- Songwriters: Bob Gaudio, Bob Crewe
- Producer: Bob Crewe

The Four Seasons singles chronology
"Big Man in Town" (1964)	"Bye Bye Baby (Baby, Goodbye)" (1965)	"Toy Soldier" (1965)

"Bye, Bye, Baby (Baby, Goodbye)" is a popular song written by Bob Crewe and Bob Gaudio (a member of The Four Seasons). The Four Seasons' version of the song made it to No. 1 in Canada and No. 12 on the US Billboard Hot 100 in 1965. On the original issue of the single, the title was "Bye Bye Baby". However, on the album, The 4 Seasons Entertain You, and on later issues of the song, the name was changed to the longer, more familiar one. The song is about saying goodbye, not because the person is unloved but rather because the relationship is adulterous ("there's a wedding ring on my finger").

Cash Box described it as "a heartfelt rhythmic stomp’er that again features the attention-getting falsetto sound of Frankie Valli and a top teen Calello arrangement."

== Chart history ==
Chart (1965)	Peak position
Canada RPM Top Singles	1
U.S. Billboard Hot 100	12
U.S. Cash Box Top 100	10

== Other charting versions ==
A version by British group The Symbols reached No. 44 in the UK Singles Chart in 1967.

A Japanese version by Hiromi Go was released in December 1975 in Japan and charted at No.9 in the Oricon charts, in the exact same backing sound style and step as the Rollers' version, including an eight-bar guitar solo, distributed by CBS/Sony, which appears in his second compilation album Go Hiromi no Subete.

== Bay City Rollers version ==
"Bye Bye Baby"
- Cover of German single

Single by Bay City Rollers

from the album Once Upon a Star
- B-side: "It's for You"
- Released: February 28, 1975
- Genre: Pop
- Length: 2:50
- Label: Bell
- Songwriters: Bob Crewe; Bob Gaudio
- Producer: Phil Wainman

Bay City Rollers singles chronology
"All of Me Loves All of You" (1974)	"Bye Bye Baby" (1975)	"Give a Little Love" (1975)

Music video
- "Bye Bye Baby" (TopPop, 1975) on YouTube

A cover of the song by the Scottish boy band Bay City Rollers was released in the UK on February 28, 1975 as the only single from the group's second studio album Once Upon a Star.

=== Release and promotion ===
It reached number one in the UK, Ireland and Australia, and was also a hit in several other music markets across the world. It was number one on the UK Singles Chart for six weeks from March 1975 and ended the year as the UK's top-selling single of 1975. The Four Seasons' version is quite sparse in instrumental backing, instead carried by the vocals, while the Bay City Rollers' is faster and has a fuller backing sound. Played a whole step lower, it includes an eight-bar guitar solo, supposedly by Eric Faulkner but probably a session musician, which is not present in the original.

=== Charts ===
==== Weekly charts ====
Chart (1975)	Peak position
Australia (Kent Music Report)	1
Austria (Ö3 Austria Top 40)	13
Belgium (Ultratop 50 Flanders)	15
Belgium (Ultratop 50 Wallonia)	38
Ireland (IRMA)	1
Netherlands (Single Top 100)	11
New Zealand (Recorded Music NZ)	32
Norway (VG-lista)	7
South Africa (Springbok Radio)	6
UK Singles (Official Charts)	1
U.S. Record World	106
West Germany (GfK)	10

==== Year-end charts ====
Chart (1975)	Rank
Australia (Kent Music Report)	12
UK (British Market Research Bureau)	1

==== 2021 weekly charts ====
Chart (2021)	Rank
UK Singles Sales (OCC)	72
UK Download Singles (OCC)	70

=== Certifications ===
Region	Certification	Certified units/sales
United Kingdom (BPI)	Gold	500,000^{^}
^{^} Shipments figures based on certification alone.
