= List of UK top-ten singles in 1974 =

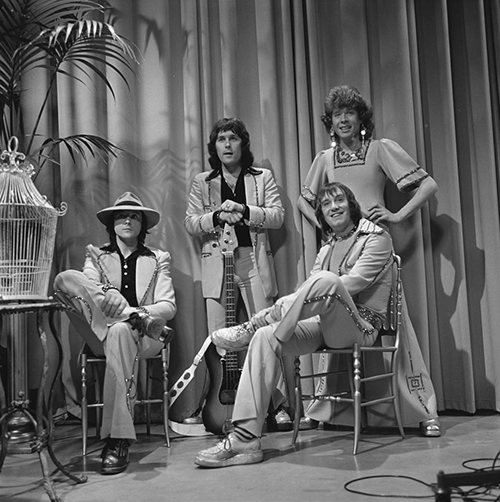
Mud had the best-selling single of 1974 with "Tiger Feet", which spent four weeks at number-one. The glam-rock group had three other top 10 hits this year, including the year's Christmas number-one single, "Lonely This Christmas", which also topped the chart for four weeks.

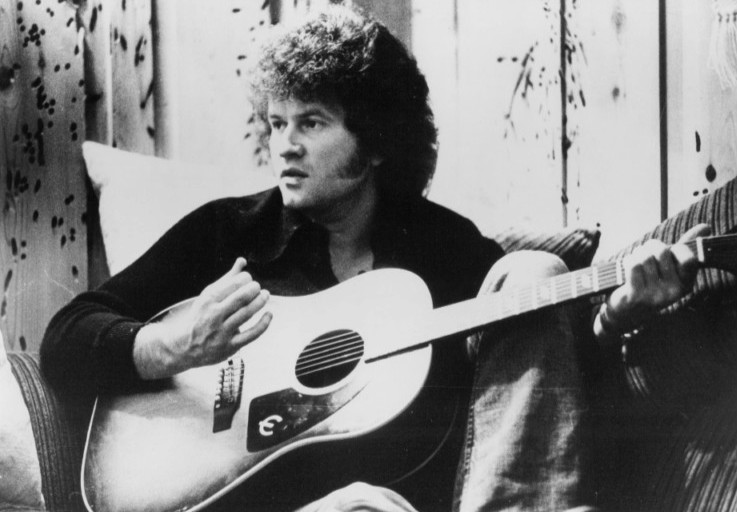
"Seasons in the Sun" by Canadian singer Terry Jacks was the second best selling single of this year, topping the UK charts for four weeks.

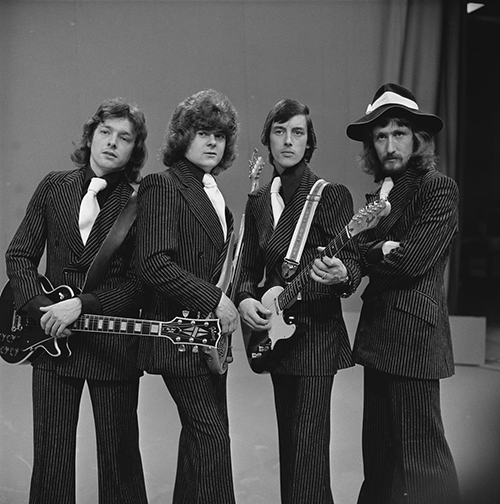
Paper Lace had two top-ten singles in 1974, including the year's third best-selling song "Billy—Don't Be a Hero", which spent three weeks at number-one in March.

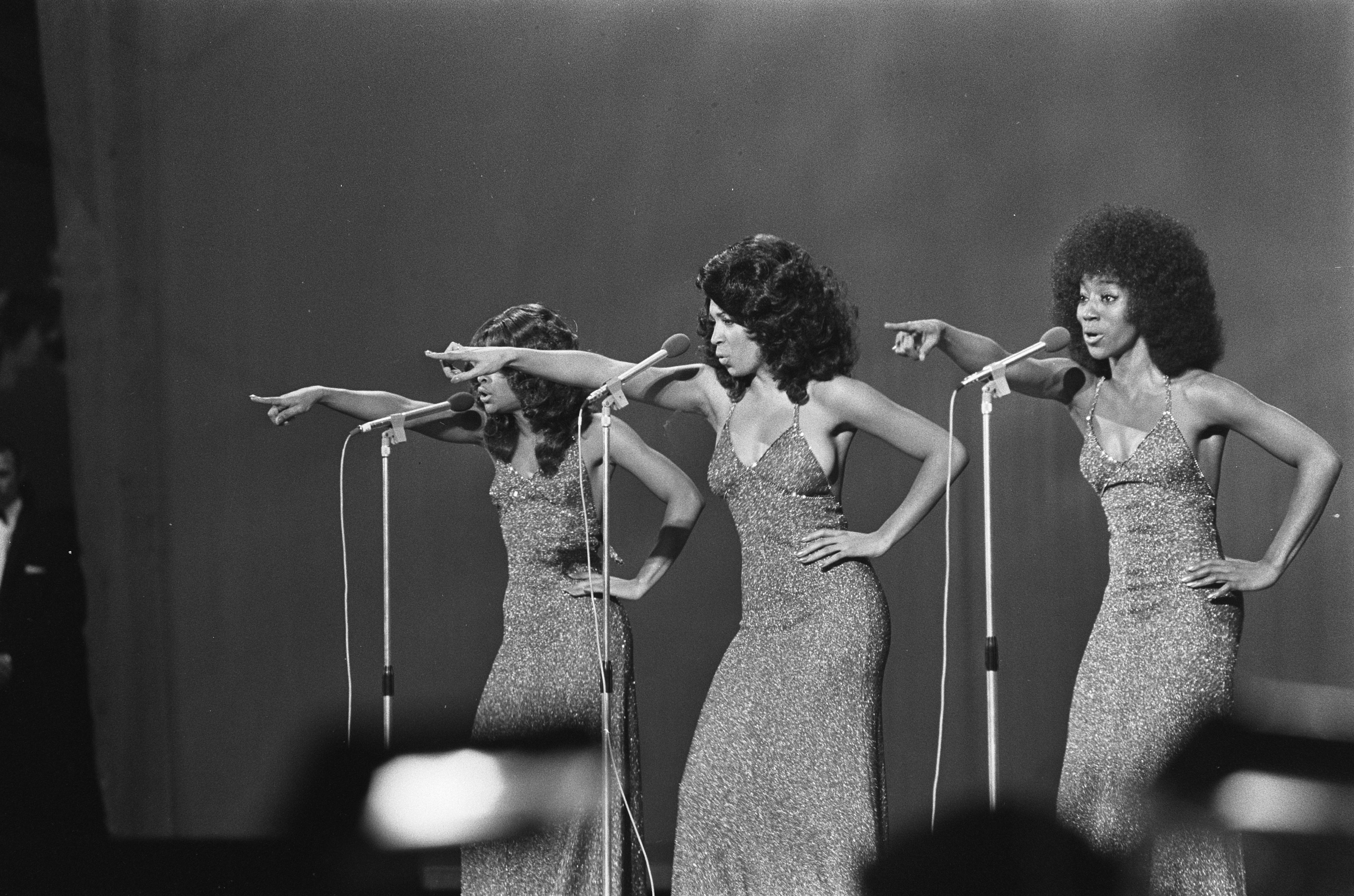
American trio The Three Degrees secured the fourth best selling track of the year with "When Will I See You Again", which topped the chart for two weeks in August.

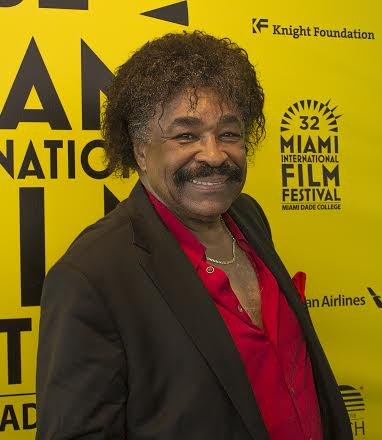
George McCrae (pictured in 2015) spent three weeks at number-one in 1974 with his signature song "Rock Your Baby". It became the fifth biggest song of this year.

The UK Singles Chart is one of many music charts compiled by the Official Charts Company that calculates the best-selling singles of the week in the United Kingdom. Before 2004, the chart was only based on the sales of physical singles. This list shows singles that peaked in the Top 10 of the UK Singles Chart during 1974, as well as singles which peaked in 1973 and 1975 but were in the top 10 in 1974. The entry date is when the single appeared in the top 10 for the first time (week ending, as published by the Official Charts Company, which is six days after the chart is announced).

One-hundred and thirty-nine singles were in the top ten in 1974. Ten singles from 1973 remained in the top 10 for several weeks at the beginning of the year, while "My Boy" by Elvis Presley, "Streets of London" by Ralph McTell and "Wombling Merry Christmas"/ by The Wombles were all released in 1974 but did not reach their peak until 1975. "The Show Must Go On" by Leo Sayer and "You Won't Find Another Fool Like Me" by The New Seekers featuring Lyn Paul were the singles from 1973 to reach their peak in 1974. Thirty-one artists scored multiple entries in the top 10 in 1974. ABBA, Barry White, Eric Clapton, Queen and Showaddywaddy were among the many artists who achieved their first UK charting top 10 single in 1974.

The 1973 Christmas number-one, "Merry Xmas Everybody" by Slade, remained at number-one for the first two weeks of 1974. The first new number-one single of the year was "You Won't Find Another Fool Like Me" by The New Seekers featuring Lyn Paul. Overall, twenty-one different singles peaked at number-one in 1974, with Mud (2) having the most singles hit that position.

== Background ==
=== Multiple entries ===
One-hundred and thirty-nine singles charted in the top 10 in 1974, with one-hundred and twenty-eight singles reaching their peak this year.

Thirty artists scored multiple entries in the top 10 in 1974. Six artists shared the record for most top 10 hits in 1974 with four hit singles each. This included two solo artists, three rock bands and a novelty group from a successful children's television series. Gary Glitter's four top 10 singles spent a total of eighteen combined weeks in the top section of the chart. Two of these went to number-one - "I Love You Love Me Love", which ascended to the top spot at the end of 1973, and "Always Yours" in June. His other two entries were "Remember Me This Way", a number three peak in March, and "Oh Yes! You're Beautiful", which ranked a place higher in November. Fellow British singer Alvin Stardust counted February number one "Jealous Mind" among his chart hits. "Red Dress" peaked at number seven in May, "You You You" at number six in September, while "My Coo Ca Choo" reached number two late in 1973.

Scottish band The Bay City Rollers had four top ten entries themselves, "Shang-a-Lang" the best performing single at number two, one place higher than "Summerlove Sensation". "All of Me Loves All of You" made number four and "Remember (Sha-La-La-La)" was a number six hit. The Wombles appeared in the chart for the first time in 1974 and had four hit singles: "Wombling Song" reached number four, "Remember You're a Womble" also ranked in the top five at number three, "Banana Rock" made number nine and "Wombling Merry Christmas" rounded off the year at number two in the Christmas chart.

Mud and Slade also both counted a song with a Christmas feel in their total - the former had the Christmas number-one "Lonely This Christmas" while the latter charted with "Merry Xmas Everybody" at the finale of the previous year, both of which became festive staples in later years. Mud's other top 10 singles in 1974 were chart-topper and year-end best-selling single "Tiger Feet", "Rocket" (number six) and "The Cat Crept In" (number two). Slade for their part saw "Everyday" and "The Bangin' Man" rise to a high of number three, with "Far Far Away" going a spot higher.

The Glitter Band, Leo Sayer and The Stylistics all had three top 10 singles in 1974. Sayer's number two single "The Show Must Go On" reached its peak in January after first charting in 1973. His other two hit songs were "Long Tall Glasses" at number four and a cover of Roger Daltrey's "One Man Band" which made number six in June. The Glitter Band's best-performing single in 1974 was "Angel Face", rising to a number four peak in April. "Just for You" (number ten) and "Let's Get Together Again" (number eight) both reached the lower region of the top 10. American group The Stylistics were the final act with three top tens this year. "You Make Me Feel Brand New" was the most successful at number two, followed by "Rockin' Roll Baby" at number six and "Let's Put It All Together" in ninth position.

Barry White was one of a number of artists with two top-ten entries, including the number-one single "You're the First, the Last, My Everything". David Bowie, Diana Ross, The New Seekers, Sweet and Wings were among the other artists who had multiple top 10 entries in 1974.

=== Chart debuts ===
Forty-nine artists achieved their first top 10 single in 1974, either as a lead or featured artist. Of these, nine went on to record another hit single that year: Barry White, Cockney Rebel, Cozy Powell, George McCrae, Paper Lace, Queen, The Rubettes, Sparks and Terry Jacks. The Glitter Band peaked in the top ten with two more singles. The Wombles had three other entries in their breakthrough year.

The following table (collapsed on desktop site) does not include acts who had previously charted as part of a group and secured their first top 10 solo single.

Artist	Number of top 10s	First entry	Chart position	Other entries
Cozy Powell	2	"Dance with the Devil"	3	"Na Na Na" (10)
Golden Earring	1	"Radar Love"	7	—
Robert Knight	1	"Love on a Mountain Top"	10	—
The Wombles	4	"The Wombling Song"	4	"Remember You're a Womble" (3), "Banana Rock" (9), "Wombling Merry Christmas" (2) ^{[A]}
The Love Unlimited Orchestra	1	"Love's Theme"	10	—
Lena Zavaroni	1	"Ma! He's Making Eyes at Me"	10	—
Paper Lace	2	"Billy—Don't Be a Hero"	1	"The Night Chicago Died" (3)
Charlie Rich	1	"The Most Beautiful Girl"	2	—
Freddie Starr	1	"It's You"	9	—
Terry Jacks	2	"Seasons in the Sun"	1	"If You Go Away" (8)
The Glitter Band	3	"Angel Face"	4	"Just for You" (10), "Let's Get Together Again" (8)
Queen	2	"Seven Seas of Rhye"	10	"Killer Queen" (2)
Sunny	1	"Doctor's Orders"	7	—
ABBA	1	"Waterloo"	1	—
The Rubettes	2	"Sugar Baby Love"	1	"Juke Box Jive" (3)
Sparks	2	"This Town Ain't Big Enough for Both of Us"	2	"Amateur Hour" (7)
Showaddywaddy	1	"Hey Rock and Roll"	2	—
Gigliola Cinquetti	1	"Go (Before You Break My Heart)"	8	—
Cockney Rebel	2	"Judy Teen"	5	"Mr. Soft"
Mouth & MacNeal	1	"I See a Star"	8	—
Arrows	1	"Touch Too Much"	8	—
The Scaffold	1	"Liverpool Lou"	7	—
Charles Aznavour	1	"She"	1	—
The Pearls	1	"Guilty"	10	—
George McCrae	2	"Rock Your Baby"	1	"I Can't Leave You Alone" (9)
Stephanie De Sykes	1	"Born with a Smile on My Face"	2	—
Rain	1	"Born with a Smile on My Face"	2	—
The Three Degrees	1	"When Will I See You Again"	1	—
The Hues Corporation	1	"Rock the Boat"	6	—
Eric Clapton	1	"I Shot the Sheriff"	9	—
Donny and Marie Osmond	1	"I'm Leaving It (All) Up to You"	2	—
Sylvia	1	"Y Viva España"	4	—
Carl Douglas	1	"Kung Fu Fighting"	1	—
Sweet Dreams	1	"Honey, Honey"	10	—
John Denver	1	"Annie's Song"	1	—
Johnny Bristol	1	"Hang On in There Baby"	3	—
Barry White	2	"Can't Get Enough of Your Love, Babe"	8	"You're the First, the Last, My Everything" (1)
KC and the Sunshine Band	1	"Queen of Clubs"	7	—
Andy Kim	1	"Rock Me Gently"	2	—
Sweet Sensation	1	"Sad Sweet Dreamer"	1	—
Peter Shelley	1	"Gee Baby"	4	—
Ken Boothe	1	"Everything I Own"	1	—
Gary Shearston	1	"I Get a Kick Out of You"	7	—
Eddie Holman	1	"Hey There Lonely Girl"	4	—
The Peppers	1	"Pepper Box"	8	—
Bachman-Turner Overdrive	1	"You Ain't Seen Nothing Yet"	2	—
Hello	1	"Tell Him"	6	—
Rupie Edwards	1	"Ire Feelings (Skanga)"	6	—
Ralph McTell	1	"Streets of London" ^{[B]}	2	—
Disco-Tex and the Sex-O-Lettes	1	"Get Dancin'"	8	—

Notes

Roy Wood of Wizzard scored his first and only solo top 10 in 1974 with "Forever" which peaked at number eight. His band had debuted with the number six entry "Ball Park Incident" in January 1973, with their most famous song "I Wish It Could Be Christmas Everyday" charting at number four in December 1973. The Glitter Band featured as uncredited backing singers for Gary Glitter early in his career (1972 to 1973), known under the name Glittermen but they charted in their own right with "Angel Face" in 1974.

Alan Price was a founding member of The Animals, best known for their song "House of the Rising Sun", and later formed the Alan Price Set. "Jarrow Song" became his sole top ten hit in his own right this year. Donny Osmond and sister Marie Osmond charted as a duo for the first time but both had previously had top 10 hits - Donny with the group The Osmonds and his solo work (including signature number one "Puppy Love"), Marie in 1973 with her solo single "Paper Roses". Andy Fairweather Low performed as a member of Amen Corner and Fair Weather before landing a top 10 entry, "Reggae Tune" reaching number ten.

=== Songs from films ===
"You're Sixteen" was a cover version of the Johnny Burnette song featured in American Graffiti in 1960. "I Get a Kick Out of You" was famously on the soundtrack to "Anything Goes" in 1934, performed by Cole Porter.

=== Best-selling singles ===
Mud had the best-selling single of the year with "Tiger Feet". The song spent seven weeks in the top 10 (including four weeks at number one) and was certified gold by the BPI. "Seasons in the Sun (Le moribond)" by Terry Jacks came in second place. Paper Lace's "Billy—Don't Be a Hero", "When Will I See You Again" from The Three Degrees and "Rock Your Baby" by George McCrae made up the top five. Singles by David Essex, Charles Aznavour, Carl Douglas, Ken Boothe and The Rubettes were also in the top ten best-selling singles of the year.

== Top-ten singles ==
Key

Symbol	Meaning
‡	Single peaked in 1973 but still in chart in 1974.
♦	Single released in 1974 but peaked in 1975.
(#)	Year-end top-ten single position and rank
Entered	The date that the single first appeared in the chart.
Peak	Highest position that the single reached in the UK Singles Chart.

Entered (week ending)	Weeks in top 10	Single	Artist	Peak	Peak reached (week ending)	Weeks at peak
Singles in 1973
17 November 1973	9	"I Love You Love Me Love" ‡	Gary Glitter	1	17 November 1973	4
24 November 1973	8	"Paper Roses" ‡ ^{[C]}	Marie Osmond	2	8 December 1973	1
24 November 1973	11	"My Coo Ca Choo" ‡	Alvin Stardust	2	1 December 1973	1
1 December 1973	11	"You Won't Find Another Fool Like Me"	The New Seekers	1	19 January 1974	1
1 December 1973	7	"Lamplight" ‡	David Essex	7	8 December 1973	2
8 December 1973	5	"Roll Away the Stone" ‡	Mott the Hoople	8	8 December 1973	2
15 December 1973	6	"Merry Xmas Everybody" ‡	Slade	1	15 December 1973	5
15 December 1973	5	"I Wish It Could Be Christmas Everyday" ‡	Wizzard	4	22 December 1973	4
15 December 1973	4	"Street Life" ‡	Roxy Music	9	15 December 1973	1
22 December 1973	9	"The Show Must Go On"	Leo Sayer	2	19 January 1974	1
Singles in 1974
12 January 1974	6	"Dance with the Devil"	Cozy Powell	3	9 February 1974	1
12 January 1974	1	"Pool Hall Richard"/"I Wish It Would Rain"	Faces	8	12 January 1974	1
12 January 1974	4	"Radar Love"	Golden Earring	7	19 January 1974	3
19 January 1974	5	"Teenage Rampage"	Sweet	2	26 January 1974	3
19 January 1974	4	"Forever"	Roy Wood	8	26 January 1974	1
19 January 1974	7	"Tiger Feet" (#1)	Mud	1	26 January 1974	4
26 January 1974	5	"Solitaire"	Andy Williams	4	9 February 1974	1
26 January 1974	2	"Love on a Mountain Top"	Robert Knight	10	26 January 1974	2
9 February 1974	4	"The Man Who Sold the World"	Lulu	3	16 February 1974	1
9 February 1974	2	"Rockin' Roll Baby"	The Stylistics	6	9 February 1974	1
9 February 1974	3	"All of My Life"	Diana Ross	9	9 February 1974	3
16 February 1974	5	"Devil Gate Drive"	Suzi Quatro	1	23 February 1974	2
16 February 1974	5	"The Wombling Song"	The Wombles	4	23 February 1974	2
23 February 1974	5	"Jealous Mind"	Alvin Stardust	1	9 March 1974	1
23 February 1974	3	"Rebel Rebel"	David Bowie	5	2 March 1974	2
23 February 1974	7	"The Air That I Breathe"	The Hollies	2	23 March 1974	1
23 February 1974	1	"Love's Theme"	The Love Unlimited Orchestra	10	23 February 1974	1
2 March 1974	5	"You're Sixteen"	Ringo Starr	4	9 March 1974	2
2 March 1974	4	"Remember (Sha-La-La-La)"	Bay City Rollers	6	9 March 1974	1
2 March 1974	1	"Ma! He's Making Eyes at Me"	Lena Zavaroni	10	2 March 1974	1
9 March 1974	7	"Billy—Don't Be a Hero" (#3)	Paper Lace	1	16 March 1974	3
9 March 1974	6	"The Most Beautiful Girl"	Charlie Rich	2	30 March 1974	1
9 March 1974	4	"Jet"	Paul McCartney and Wings	7	23 March 1974	1
16 March 1974	2	"It's You"	Freddie Starr	9	16 March 1974	2
23 March 1974	3	"I Get a Little Sentimental Over You"	The New Seekers	5	30 March 1974	1
23 March 1974	5	"Emma"	Hot Chocolate	3	6 April 1974	1
30 March 1974	7	"Seasons in the Sun" (#2)	Terry Jacks	1	6 April 1974	4
30 March 1974	4	"Remember Me This Way"	Gary Glitter	3	13 April 1974	1
30 March 1974	6	"Angel Face"	The Glitter Band	4	20 April 1974	1
6 April 1974	4	"Everyday"	Slade	3	20 April 1974	1
6 April 1974	5	"You Are Everything"	Diana Ross & Marvin Gaye	5	20 April 1974	1
13 April 1974	4	"The Cat Crept In"	Mud	2	20 April 1974	2
13 April 1974	1	"Seven Seas of Rhye"	Queen	10	13 April 1974	1
20 April 1974	5	"Remember You're a Womble"	The Wombles	3	11 May 1974	1
20 April 1974	3	"Doctor's Orders"	Sunny	7	4 May 1974	1
27 April 1974	5	"Waterloo" ^{[D]}	ABBA	1	4 May 1974	2
27 April 1974	4	"Homely Girl"	The Chi-Lites	5	4 May 1974	1
27 April 1974	3	"A Walkin' Miracle"	Limmie & Family Cookin'	6	4 May 1974	1
4 May 1974	3	"Rock 'n' Roll Winter (Loony's Tune)"	Wizzard	6	11 May 1974	2
11 May 1974	6	"Sugar Baby Love" (#10)	The Rubettes	1	18 May 1974	4
11 May 1974	4	"Don't Stay Away Too Long"	Peters and Lee	3	18 May 1974	1
11 May 1974	4	"Shang-a-Lang"	Bay City Rollers	2	25 May 1974	1
11 May 1974	1	"He's Misstra Know-It-All"	Stevie Wonder	10	11 May 1974	1
18 May 1974	4	"The Night Chicago Died"	Paper Lace	3	1 June 1974	1
18 May 1974	6	"This Town Ain't Big Enough for Both of Us"	Sparks	2	1 June 1974	2
18 May 1974	3	"Red Dress"	Alvin Stardust	7	25 May 1974	1
25 May 1974	2	"Break the Rules" ^{[E]}	Status Quo	8	25 May 1974	1
25 May 1974	6	"There's a Ghost in My House"	R. Dean Taylor	3	15 June 1974	1
25 May 1974	3	"If I Didn't Care"	David Cassidy	9	1 June 1974	2
1 June 1974	6	"Hey Rock and Roll"	Showaddywaddy	2	15 June 1974	1
1 June 1974	1	"Go (Before You Break My Heart)" ^{[F]}	Gigliola Cinquetti	8	1 June 1974	1
8 June 1974	5	"The Streak"	Ray Stevens	1	15 June 1974	1
8 June 1974	3	"Judy Teen"	Cockney Rebel	5	22 June 1974	1
8 June 1974	2	"I See a Star" ^{[G]}	Mouth & MacNeal	8	8 June 1974	1
15 June 1974	6	"Always Yours"	Gary Glitter	1	22 June 1974	1
15 June 1974	3	"Jarrow Song"	Alan Price	6	22 June 1974	1
15 June 1974	3	"Touch Too Much"	Arrows	8	22 June 1974	1
22 June 1974	1	"Liverpool Lou"	The Scaffold	7	22 June 1974	1
22 June 1974	6	"I'd Love You to Want Me"	Lobo	5	13 July 1974	1
29 June 1974	6	"She" (#7) ^{[H]}	Charles Aznavour	1	29 June 1974	4
29 June 1974	3	"One Man Band"	Leo Sayer	6	29 June 1974	2
29 June 1974	7	"Kissin' in the Back Row of the Movies"	The Drifters	2	6 July 1974	3
6 July 1974	4	"The Bangin' Man"	Slade	3	13 July 1974	1
6 July 1974	5	"Young Girl" ^{[I]}	Gary Puckett & The Union Gap	6	20 July 1974	2
6 July 1974	1	"Guilty"	The Pearls	10	6 July 1974	1
13 July 1974	7	"Rock Your Baby" (#5)	George McCrae	1	27 July 1974	3
13 July 1974	5	"Band on the Run"	Paul McCartney and Wings	3	3 August 1974	1
13 July 1974	1	"The Wall Street Shuffle"	10cc	10	13 July 1974	1
20 July 1974	2	"If You Go Away" ^{[J]}	Terry Jacks	8	20 July 1974	1
20 July 1974	1	"Banana Rock"	The Wombles	9	20 July 1974	1
27 July 1974	4	"Born with a Smile on My Face"	Stephanie De Sykes with Rain	2	3 August 1974	1
27 July 1974	8	"When Will I See You Again" (#4)	The Three Degrees	1	17 August 1974	2
27 July 1974	1	"The Six Teens"	Sweet	9	27 July 1974	1
3 August 1974	6	"You Make Me Feel Brand New"	The Stylistics	2	24 August 1974	1
3 August 1974	2	"Amateur Hour"	Sparks	7	10 August 1974	1
10 August 1974	4	"Summerlove Sensation"	Bay City Rollers	3	24 August 1974	1
10 August 1974	3	"Rocket"	Mud	6	10 August 1974	1
10 August 1974	3	"Rock the Boat"	The Hues Corporation	6	17 August 1974	1
17 August 1974	5	"What Becomes of the Brokenhearted" ^{[K]}	Jimmy Ruffin	4	24 August 1974	1
17 August 1974	2	"I Shot the Sheriff"	Eric Clapton	9	17 August 1974	2
17 August 1974	1	"It's Only Rock 'n Roll (But I Like It)"	The Rolling Stones	10	17 August 1974	1
24 August 1974	5	"I'm Leavin' It (All) Up to You"	Donny & Marie Osmond	2	7 September 1974	1
24 August 1974	1	"Just for You"	The Glitter Band	10	24 August 1974	1
31 August 1974	5	"Love Me for a Reason"	The Osmonds	1	31 August 1974	3
31 August 1974	5	"Y Viva España"	Sylvia	4	14 September 1974	1
31 August 1974	2	"Mr. Soft"	Cockney Rebel	8	31 August 1974	1
31 August 1974	7	"Kung Fu Fighting" (#8)	Carl Douglas	1	21 September 1974	3
31 August 1974	2	"Honey, Honey"	Sweet Dreams	10	31 August 1974	2
7 September 1974	7	"Annie's Song"	John Denver	1	12 October 1974	1
14 September 1974	5	"Hang On in There Baby"	Johnny Bristol	3	28 September 1974	2
14 September 1974	5	"You You You"	Alvin Stardust	6	28 September 1974	1
14 September 1974	2	"Na Na Na"	Cozy Powell	10	14 September 1974	2
21 September 1974	4	"Can't Get Enough of Your Love, Babe"	Barry White	8	21 September 1974	2
21 September 1974	3	"Queen of Clubs"	KC and the Sunshine Band	7	28 September 1974	1
28 September 1974	5	"Rock Me Gently"	Andy Kim	2	12 October 1974	1
28 September 1974	4	"Long Tall Glasses (I Can Dance)"	Leo Sayer	4	5 October 1974	1
5 October 1974	5	"Sad Sweet Dreamer"	Sweet Sensation	1	19 October 1974	1
5 October 1974	4	"Gee Baby"	Peter Shelley	4	19 October 1974	1
12 October 1974	1	"Knock on Wood"	David Bowie	10	12 October 1974	1
19 October 1974	6	"Everything I Own" (#9)	Ken Boothe	1	26 October 1974	3
19 October 1974	5	"Far Far Away"	Slade	2	26 October 1974	2
19 October 1974	1	"Farewell"/"Bring It On Home to Me"/"You Send Me"	Rod Stewart	7	19 October 1974	1
19 October 1974	2	"I Get a Kick Out of You"	Gary Shearston	7	26 October 1974	1
19 October 1974	1	"Reggae Tune"	Andy Fairweather-Low	10	19 October 1974	1
26 October 1974	5	"All of Me Loves All of You"	Bay City Rollers	4	26 October 1974	3
26 October 1974	3	"(You're) Having My Baby"	Paul Anka	6	26 October 1974	1
26 October 1974	2	"I Can't Leave You Alone"	George McCrae	9	26 October 1974	2
26 October 1974	8	"Gonna Make You a Star" (#6)	David Essex	1	16 November 1974	3
2 November 1974	6	"Killer Queen"	Queen	2	16 November 1974	2
2 November 1974	3	"Down On The Beach Tonight"	The Drifters	7	9 November 1974	1
2 November 1974	2	"Let's Get Together Again"	The Glitter Band	8	9 November 1974	1
9 November 1974	5	"Hey There Lonely Girl"	Eddie Holman	4	16 November 1974	2
9 November 1974	3	"Let's Put It All Together"	The Stylistics	9	16 November 1974	2
16 November 1974	8	"You're the First, the Last, My Everything"	Barry White	1	7 December 1974	2
16 November 1974	3	"Pepper Box"	The Peppers	6	23 November 1974	1
23 November 1974	1	"No, Honestly" ^{[L]}	Lynsey de Paul	7	23 November 1974	1
23 November 1974	8	"Juke Box Jive"	The Rubettes	3	7 December 1974	4
30 November 1974	6	"Oh Yes! You're Beautiful"	Gary Glitter	2	14 December 1974	1
30 November 1974	6	"You Ain't Seen Nothing Yet"	Bachman-Turner Overdrive	2	21 December 1974	2
30 November 1974	1	"The Wild One"	Suzi Quatro	7	30 November 1974	1
30 November 1974	1	"Too Good to Be Forgotten"	The Chi-Lites	10	30 November 1974	1
7 December 1974	4	"Tell Him"	Hello	6	7 December 1974	1
7 December 1974	5	"My Boy" ♦	Elvis Presley	5	4 January 1975	1
7 December 1974	2	"Ire Feelings (Skanga)"	Rupie Edwards	9	14 December 1974	1
14 December 1974	6	"Lonely This Christmas"	Mud	1	21 December 1974	4
14 December 1974	1	"Lucy in the Sky with Diamonds"	Elton John	10	14 December 1974	1
21 December 1974	4	"Wombling Merry Christmas" ♦	The Wombles	2	4 January 1975	1
21 December 1974	6	"Streets of London" ♦	Ralph McTell	2	11 January 1975	2
21 December 1974	4	"Get Dancin'"	Disco-Tex and the Sex-O-Lettes	8	21 December 1974	3

== Entries by artist ==
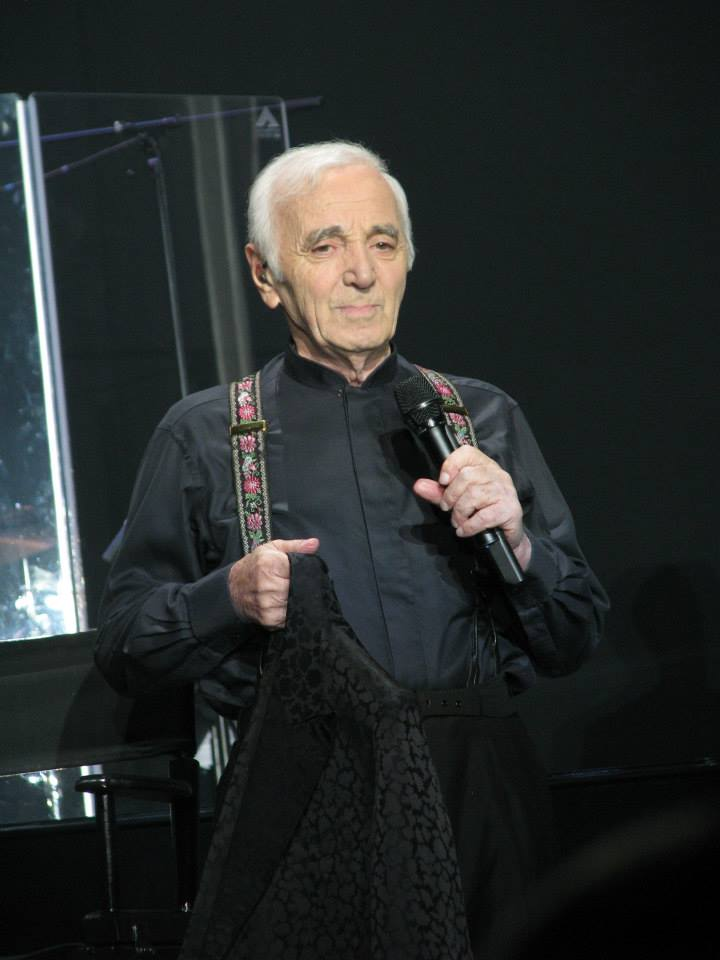
Legendary French singer Charles Aznavour (pictured in 2014), achieved his sole UK top 10 entry in June with "She", the theme tune from the television series Seven Faces of Woman, which spent four weeks at number-one.

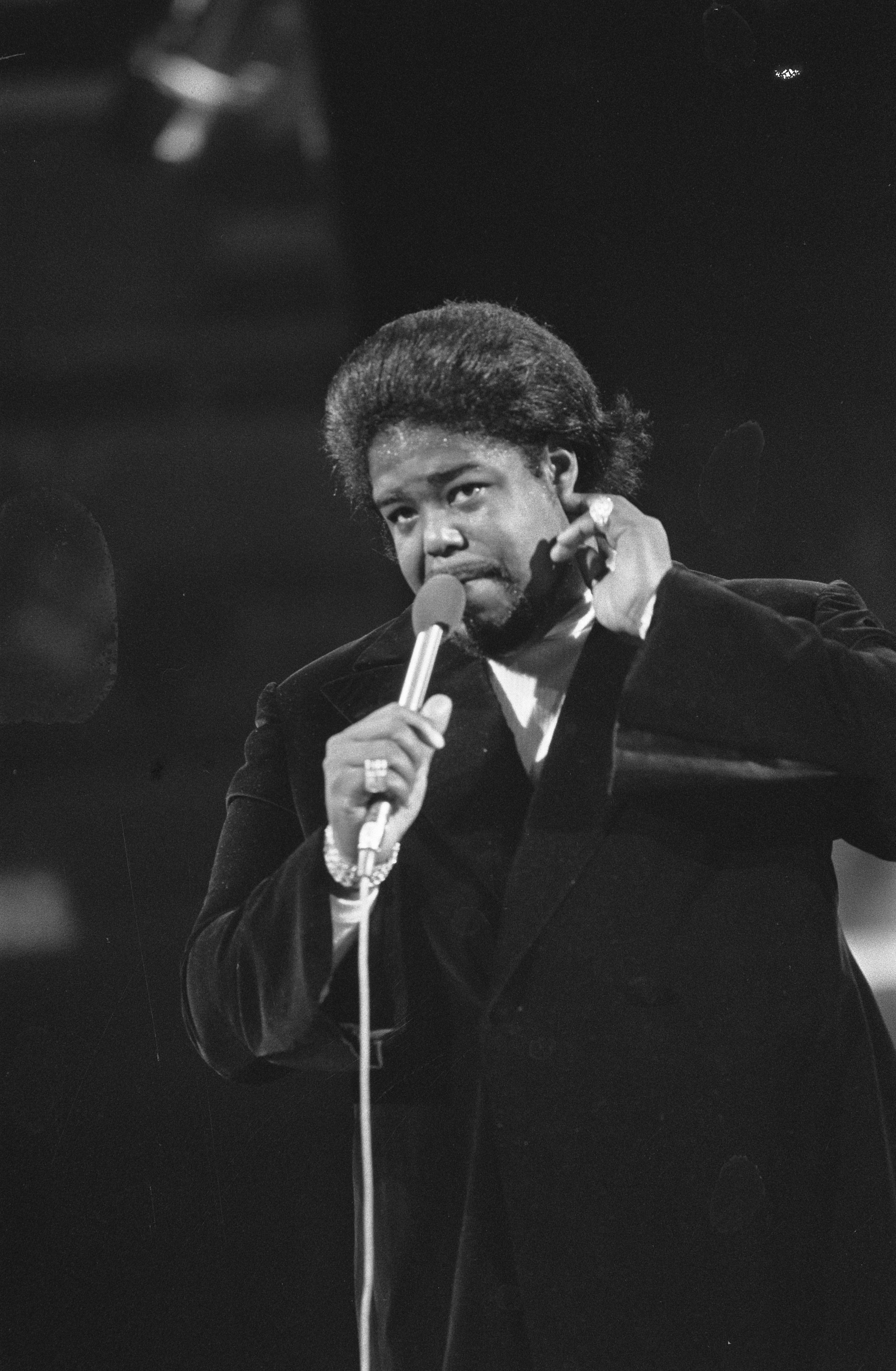
Barry White made his UK top 10 debut in 1974, with two singles making the countdown, including his only number-one hit, "You're the First, the Last, My Everything".

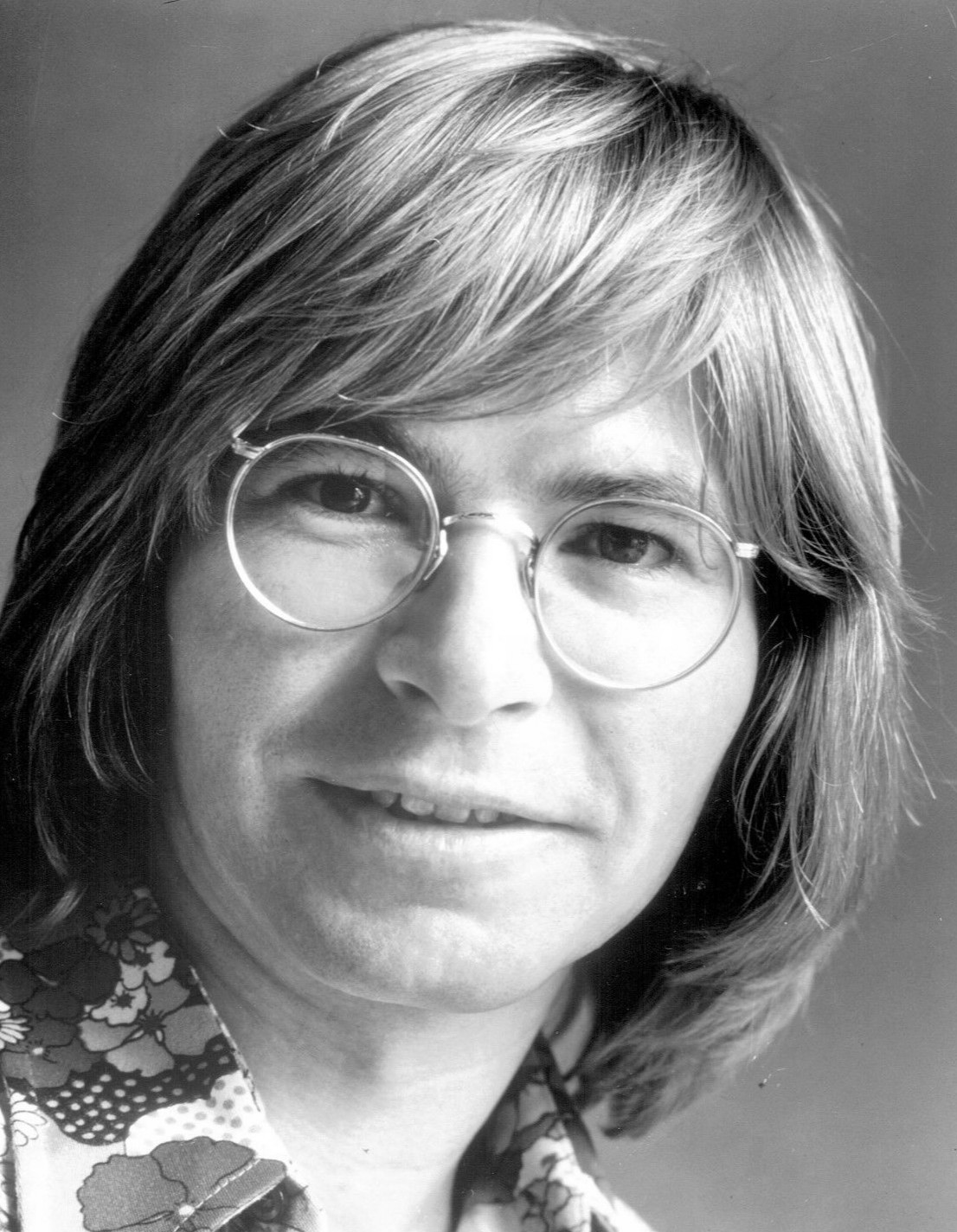
John Denver scored his only UK top 10 single this year with "Annie's Song", which spent a week at number-one in October.

The following table shows artists who achieved two or more top 10 entries in 1974, including singles that reached their peak in 1973 or 1975. The figures include both main artists and featured artists, while appearances on ensemble charity records are also counted for each artist. The total number of weeks an artist spent in the top ten in 1974 is also shown.

Entries	Artist	Weeks	Singles
4	Alvin Stardust ^{[M]}	10	"Jealous Mind", "My Coo Ca Choo", "Red Dress", "You You You"
4	Bay City Rollers	17	"All of Me Loves All of You", "Remember (Sha-La-La-La)", "Shang-a-Lang", "Summerlove Sensation"
4	Gary Glitter ^{[M]}	18	"Always Yours", "I Love You Love Me Love", "Oh Yes! You're Beautiful", "Remember Me This Way"
4	Mud	17	"Lonely This Christmas", "Rocket", "The Cat Crept In", "Tiger Feet"
4	Slade ^{[M]}	16	"Everyday", "Far Far Away", "Merry Xmas Everybody", "The Bangin' Man"
4	The Wombles ^{[N]}	13	"Banana Rock", "Remember You're a Womble", "The Wombling Song", "Wombling Merry Christmas",
3	The Glitter Band	9	"Angel Face", "Just for You", "Let's Get Together Again"
3	Leo Sayer ^{[O]}	14	"Long Tall Glasses (I Can Dance)", "One Man Band", "The Show Must Go On"
3	Roy Wood ^{[M]}	9	"I Wish It Could Be Christmas Everyday", "Forever", "Rock 'n' Roll Winter (Loony's Tune)"
3	The Stylistics	11	"Let's Put It All Together", "Rockin' Roll Baby", "You Make Me Feel Brand New"
2	Barry White	11	"Can't Get Enough of Your Love, Babe", "You're the First, the Last, My Everything"
2	The Chi-Lites	5	"Homely Girl", "Too Good to Be Forgotten"
2	Cockney Rebel	5	"Judy Teen", "Mr. Soft"
2	Cozy Powell	8	"Dance with the Devil", "Na Na Na"
2	David Bowie	4	"Knock on Wood", "Rebel Rebel"
2	David Essex ^{[M]}	10	"Gonna Make You a Star", "Lamplight"
2	Diana Ross	8	"All of My Life", "You Are Everything",
2	Donny Osmond ^{[P]}	10	"I'm Leavin' It (All) Up to You", "Love Me for a Reason"
2	The Drifters	10	"Down on the Beach Tonight", "Kissin' in the Back Row of the Movies"
2	George McCrae	9	"I Can't Leave You Alone""Rock Your Baby",
2	Marie Osmond ^{[M]}	7	"I'm Leavin' It (All) Up to You", "Paper Roses"
2	The New Seekers ^{[O]}	9	"I Get a Little Sentimental Over You", "You Won't Find Another Fool Like Me"
2	Paper Lace	11	"Billy—Don't Be a Hero", "The Night Chicago Died"
2	Paul McCartney and Wings	9	"Band on the Run", "Jet"
2	Queen	7	"Killer Queen", "Seven Seas of Rhye"
2	The Rubettes	8	"Juke Box Jive", "Sugar Baby Love"
2	Suzi Quatro	6	"Devil Gate Drive", "The Wild One"
2	Sweet	6	"Teenage Rampage", "The Six Teens"
2	Terry Jacks	9	"If You Go Away", "Seasons in the Sun"
2	Wizzard ^{[M]}	5	"I Wish It Could Be Christmas Everyday", "Rock 'n' Roll Winter (Loony's Tune)"

== Notes ==
- ^{a} "Wombling Merry Christmas" reached its peak of number two on 4 January 1975 (week ending).
- ^{b} "Streets of London" reached its peak of number two on 11 January 1975 (week ending).
- ^{c} "Paper Roses" re-entered the top 10 at number 8 on 19 January 1974 (week ending).
- ^{d} "I Get a Little Sentimental Over You" and "You Won't Find Another Fool Like Me" were both credited to The New Seekers featuring Lyn Paul by the Official Charts Company because she was singing lead vocals for the first time.
- ^{d} "Waterloo" was Sweden's winning entry at the Eurovision Song Contest in 1974.
- ^{e} "Break the Rules" re-entered the top 10 at number 10 on 8 June 1974 (week ending).
- ^{f} "Go (Before You Break My Heart)" was Italy's entry at the Eurovision Song Contest in 1974.
- ^{g} "I See a Star" was the Netherlands' entry at the Eurovision Song Contest in 1974.
- ^{h} "She" was the theme song to the television series Seven Faces of Woman.
- ^{i} "Young Girl" originally peaked at number 1 on its initial release in 1968. In 1974, the song was re-released as part of a CBS Records series entitled "Hall of Fame Hits".
- ^{j} "If You Go Away" re-entered the top 10 at number 10 on 3 August 1974 (week ending).
- ^{k} "What Becomes of the Brokenhearted" originally peaked at number 8 on its initial release in 1966.
- ^{l} "No, Honestly" was the theme song to the LWT television comedy series No, Honestly.
- ^{m} Figure includes single that peaked in 1973.
- ^{n} Figure includes single that peaked in 1975.
- ^{o} Figure includes single that first charted in 1973 but peaked in 1974.
- ^{p} Figure includes a top 10 hit with the group The Osmonds.

== See also ==
- 1974 in British music
- List of number-one singles from the 1970s (UK)
