= It's You =

It's You may refer to:

== Albums ==
- It's You (album), by Lee Konitz, 1996
- It's You, by Umphrey's McGee, 2018

== Songs ==
- "It's You" (Ai song), 2026
- "It's You" (Ali Gatie song), 2019
- "It's You" (Duck Sauce song), 2013
- "It's You" (Freddie Starr song), 1974
- "It's You" (Love Psychedelico song), 2011
- "It's You" (Super Junior song), 2009
- "It's You" (Zayn song), 2016
- "It's You", by Alma Cogan, 1964
- "It's You", by Black Motion featuring Miss P, 2015
- "It's You", by Bob Seger from Like a Rock, 1986
- "It's You", by the Coral from Distance Inbetween, 2016
- "It's You", by David Gates from Take Me Now, 1981
- "It's You", or "It's You That Leaves Me Dry", by EMF from Stigma, 1992
- "It's You", by Fireflight from The Healing of Harms, 2006
- "It's You", by Girls' Generation from Holiday Night, 2017
- "It's You", by Lala Karmela
- "It's You", by Meredith Willson from The Music Man, 1957
- "It's You", by Michelle Branch from Hotel Paper, 2003
- "It's You", by Molly Kate Kestner, 2017
- "It's You", by Peter Peter from Heated Rivalry (Original Series Soundtrack), 2026
- "It's You", by Simply Red from Home, 2003
- "It's You", by the Specials from Guilty 'til Proved Innocent!, 1998
- "It's You", by Stevie Wonder from The Woman in Red, 1984
- "It's You", by Sung Si-kyung, 2010
- "It's You", by Taemin from Famous, 2019
- "It's You", by Talk Talk from It's My Life, 1984
- "It's You", by Urban Mystic, 2005
- "It's You", by Westlife from Back Home, 2007

== Other uses ==
- "It's You" (BoJack Horseman), a 2016 television episode
- It's You, a 2015 novel by Jane Porter
