= Saturday Night (Bay City Rollers song) =

- Dutch single of 1974 re-recording

Single by Bay City Rollers

from the album Rollin'
- B-side: "Marlina"
- Released: 29 June 1973 (UK); August 1975 (US)
- Recorded: 1973
- Genre: Bubblegum; power pop; teen pop
- Length: 2:56
- Label: Arista
- Songwriters: Bill Martin, Phil Coulter
- Producers: Bill Martin, Phil Coulter

Bay City Rollers singles chronology
| "Love Me Like I Love You" (1975) | "Saturday Night" (1973) | "Money Honey" (1976) |

Music video
- "Saturday Night" (TopPop, 1976) on YouTube

"Saturday Night" is a song recorded by the Scottish pop rock band Bay City Rollers, taken from their debut album Rollin' (1974). Written and produced by Bill Martin and Phil Coulter, it was originally released in June 1973 in the UK where it did not chart. The song was re-recorded with new vocals and given a North American release in August 1975 to become a chart-topper in the US and Canada.

== Background and legacy ==
The song is an upbeat rock number with a memorable hook, in which the word "Saturday" is spelled out in a rhythmic, enthusiastic chant. The group first recorded the song in 1973—their fourth single, released in June, with Gordon "Nobby" Clark on vocals—but it failed to chart. The song was re-recorded for the Rollers' 1974 UK album Rollin' with lead vocals by Les McKeown, Clark's replacement. In the autumn of 1975, this version was released in the US as a single (but not in the UK), reaching number 1 on Billboard's Hot 100 in the issue dated 3 January 1976. The single also reached number one on the RPM Canadian Singles Chart listing dated 10 January 1976. This is the band's sole number 1 in the US.

In 2019, the record was used in Netflix's Umbrella Academy series. In 2021, Billboard credited the song as being a "timeless weekend anthem". In the same year, Gold Radio ranked the song as the sixth best Bay City Rollers song.

== Release ==
"Saturday Night" was originally released in the United Kingdom in June 1973, but failed to match the commercial success of the bands previous singles including "Keep On Dancing", "Remember (Sha-La-La-La)" and "Shang-a-Lang". It was later released in the United States in August 1975 and became a commercial success for the bands in the American market, reaching number 1 on the US Billboard Hot 100 singles charts where it remained for one week, and spending a combined total of seventeen weeks within the Hot 100 charts. It was subsequently certified Gold by the Recording Industry Association of America (RIAA) for sales in excess of one million copies. Like in the United States, it reached number 1 in Canada, and too was certified Gold by Music Canada for sales in excess of 75,000 copies.

Bill Martin, who had been a frequent collaborator of the band, claimed that "Saturday Night" had sold over 12 million copies globally.

== Charts ==
=== Weekly charts ===
| Chart (1974–1976) | Peak position |
|---|---|
| Canada Top Singles (RPM) | 1 |
| Netherlands (Dutch Top 40) | 2 |
| South Africa (Springbok) | 16 |
| US Billboard Hot 100 | 1 |
| West Germany (GfK) | 10 |

=== Year-end charts ===
| Chart (1975) | Rank |
|---|---|
| Canada | 106 |

| Chart (1976) | Rank |
|---|---|
| Canada | 33 |
| US Billboard Hot 100 | 64 |

== Certifications ==
| Region | Certification | Certified units/sales |
|---|---|---|
| Canada (Music Canada) | Gold | 75,000^{^} |
| United States (RIAA) | Gold | 1,000,000^{^} |
^{^} Shipments figures based on certification alone.

== Cover versions ==
Two covers have been aired as the opening theme song for the pre-game show of Hockey Night in Canada: Canadian hard rock band Monster Truck covered first for the 2017–2018 season.

== Sampling ==
The 'Hey! Ho! Let's Go' chant in "Blitzkrieg Bop" by the Ramones was, according to Tommy Ramone, inspired by "Saturday Night".

Down With Webster's "Saturday Night" and Simple Plan's "Saturday" interpolate the opening "S-A-T-U-R-D-A-Y Night" chant.

== Credits and personnel ==
- Production – Bill Martin & Phil Coulter (track A), Phil Wainman (track B)
