= Love Me Like I Love You =

Single by Bay City Rollers
- B-side: "Mama Li"
- Released: March 20, 1975
- Label: Bell Records
- Songwriters: Eric Faulkner, Stuart Wood
- Producer: Miff Winwood

Bay City Rollers singles chronology
"Don't Stop the Music" (1976)	"Love Me Like I Love You" (1975)	"Saturday Night" (1976)

"Love Me Like I Love You" is a single released by the Scottish band, the Bay City Rollers, released as a non-album single on 20 March 1976 via the band's record label, Bell Records.

== Background and release ==
The song was written by band members Eric Faulkner and Stuart Wood and has been described by Simon Spence in his biography about the band as their "finest moment as a self-contained unit". He praised the song's "great harmonies, cool hooks and classic chorus". The band's manager, Tam Paton, had been impressed with the song and was determined to spearhead the recording for their next single release.

Upon its release, "Love Me Like I Love You" continued the band's commercial success internationally, reaching a peak of number four in the UK singles chart, as well as number seven in Australia, number 15 in Germany and eight in Ireland. Additionally, it reached number 28 in the Netherlands whilst also reaching number 18 in New Zealand.

== Track listing ==
1. "Love Me Like I Love You" – 3:20
2. "Mama Li" – 3:16

== Charts ==
Chart (1976)	Peak position
German Singles (GfK)	15
Australian Singles (GfK)	7
Ireland Singles (GfK)	8
Dutch Singles (GfK)	28
New Zealand Singles (GfK)	15
UK Singles (OCC)	4
