= All of Me Loves All of You =

Single by Bay City Rollers
- B-side: "The Bump"
- Released: 1974
- Length: 3:05
- Label: Bell
- Songwriter(s): Bill Martin, Phil Coulter
- Producer(s): Bill Martin, Phil Coulter

Bay City Rollers singles chronology
"Summerlove Sensation" (1974)	"All of Me Loves All of You" (1974)	"Bye, Bye, Baby" (1975)

"All of Me Loves All of You" is a non–album single released by Scottish band, the Bay City Rollers, in 1974. Written by Bill Martin and Phil Coulter, it was released via the band's record label Bell Records and was not included on the band's debut album, Rollin' (1974).

== Background ==
The band had released their debut album, Rollin, prior to the release of "All of Me Loves All of You". Band member Eric Faulkner had claimed he was "disappointed" with the album as a result of the band only having a total of four days to record the album, and described the production of the album as being "diabolical". Such claims were disputed by the bands manager, Tam Paton, who later said that "the band don't really mean what they say", and said that the only "downfall" of Rollin as far as he was concerned was "the Coulter and Martin track "Jenny Gotta Dance", which lead to rumours of Eric Faulkner having a girlfriend called Jenny". Such claims resulted in teenage fans writing to the band's fan club threatening to commit suicide, if the rumours were true regarding Faulkner's relationship.

Phil Coulter described Rollin as being "the essential Rollers sound", and said the album was responsible for "getting the band the attention. "All of Me Loves All of You" was deliberately omitted from Rollin by Bell Records, as they felt the song was not as strong as other songs they had written, particularly the single's b-side, "The Bump", which was also written and produced by both Coulter and Martin. Ahead of its release, there were doubts over how commercially successful the single would become as a result of its lack of strength in its songwriting, something which could be attributed to the ensuing breakdown in professional partnership between both Coulter and Martin.

== Release and promotion ==
The faltering relationship between Coulter and Martin had not been publicised prior to the release of the single, leading the band's manager Tam Paton to believe he was "being cunning", as he had a strong sense of belief that "by suggesting the pair had lost their professional touch, it would lessen the impact when the reality was published that the band had lost their hit songwriters". The band debuted "All of Me Loves All of You" on national television in the United Kingdom on The Geordie Scene, with further promotional appearances of the song on Top of the Pops on both 11 October and 24 October 1974, followed by a performance on Lift Off with Ayshea on 15 October 1974. Similarly, the band appeared on the front cover of Disc to promote both the single and their upcoming British tour, the Ready for the Road Tour.

== Commercial performance ==
Upon its release, "All of Me Loves All of You" debuted on the UK Singles Chart at number 31 on 12 October 1974. The following week, it had risen to number 11 before reaching its peak position of number four on 26 October 1974. It remained at number four in the United Kingdom for a further two weeks, and subsequently spent a combined total of ten weeks within the UK Chart. Despite commercial success in the United Kingdom, "All of Me Loves All of You" did not appear in any other national singles charts internationally other than in Ireland, where it reached number five on the Irish Singles Charts.

== Charts ==
Chart (1974)	Peak position
UK Singles (OCC)	4
Ireland Singles (IRMA)	5

== Certifications ==
Region	Certification	Certified units/sales
United Kingdom (BPI)	Silver	250,000^{^}
^{^} Shipments figures based on certification alone.
