= Mat Camison =

French keyboardist and electronic musician

Mathias Camison
- Born: August 5, 1941 (age 83); Algiers, Algeria
- Genres: Library music, electronic, pop, disco, funk
- Occupation(s): Keyboardist, composer, producer
- Instrument(s): Keyboards, synthesizer
- Years active: 1950s–present

Mathias Camison (born 5 August 1941) is a French keyboardist and electronic musician, responsible for many library and pop recordings, especially during the 1970s.

Born in Algiers, Algeria, Camison moved to France in 1955 and in the late 1950s formed his first group, Les Français, with Jacky Rault on drums and Jacky Hythier on bass, later joined by guitarist Ted Tunnicliffe of the Krewkats, recently arrived from Germany. The group backed many of the leading French pop musicians of the time, primarily France Gall at the start of her career, and recorded two EPs for Columbia Records in 1964, one featuring the Lead Belly song "Goodnight Irene" and the second comprising instrumentals including Camison's composition "Suspenses".

He became a leading session musician in Paris. In 1972, he recorded a version of the instrumental "Popcorn", under the name Mister K - The Synthesiser, and also an album, Pop-Arp. The following year, he fronted the group The Peppers, who had an international hit with the single "Pepper Box". The composition of the song was credited to "Arpadys", a pseudonym used by Camison with his writing partner, drummer Pierre-Alain Dahan. Camison and Dahan were responsible for much French instrumental and library music of the period for the Tele Music label, and for the disco / funk single "Please Love Me Again" / "West Coast Drive” credited to V.I.P. Connection.

Camison also continued as a session musician working with such recording artists as Nino Ferrer, Richard Anthony, Serge Lama, Claude François, Dalida, and Sheila. In the mid-1970s, he formed the disco studio group Résonance with singer and composer Pierre Bachelet. He has also written extensively for film and theatre productions.
