= Rosetta Stone (1970s band) =

Northern Irish band

Rosetta Stone were a glam rock band from Downpatrick, Northern Ireland, which included the ex-guitarist of the Bay City Rollers, Ian Mitchell. The group released two albums and one EP before dissolving in 1984.

The genesis of Rosetta Stone came in 1973, as childhood friends Mitchell, Terry McKee, Damian McKee, and Colin McKee (not the footballer Colin McKee) formed a band called Young City Stars. They played local clubs and dance halls, often opening concerts for the Bay City Rollers with their sound engineer Brian Herron.

In early 1976, Mitchell left the Young City Stars to join the Bay City Rollers. He was replaced by Belfast-born guitarist Andy LeGear. Mitchell would return later that year as the group, now managed by Rollers manager Tam Paton, changed their name to Rosetta Stone. In 1977, Rosetta Stone signed with Private Stock Records. They appeared on Marc Bolan's TV show Marc performing their single, a cover of Cream's "Sunshine of Your Love". Their eponymous debut album (known as Rock Pictures in some territories) was released in the United States in May 1978. A second album, Caught in the Act, followed in 1979.

In early 1979, Mitchell once again departed, to be replaced by Paul "Flash" Lerwill. Lerwill (a former Edinburgh DJ at local hotspot, Clouds). Lerwill left the band in 1982 and was replaced by Enda Walsh. That same year, the EP Hiding from Love was released, after which the group permanently disbanded. The tracks "Hiding from Love", "Remember" and "Straight from the Heart" were all penned by Bryan Adams. "Hiding from Love", which had previously been a No. 64 hit in Canada for Adams in 1980, became a bigger hit for Rosetta Stone, where it reached No. 46 in Canada in 1982. Adams would later record his own version of "Straight from the Heart" in 1983, and made it a top 20 hit in Canada and a top 10 hit in the US. Soon after, their roadie Brian left the band due to family commitments and went on to produce his own record label in Miami, Florida.

There have been a number of Rosetta fests (reunions) where the band have performed together again. The final fest was held in Toronto in September 2007. In 2012, they held a sold out reunion show in their hometown at Mullan's Bar, Downpatrick.
