= Gregory Gray =

British musician

Background information
- Also known as: Mary Cigarettes
- Born: Paul Lerwill; 20 May 1959; Portrush, Northern Ireland
- Died: 25 April 2019 (aged 59) Hertfordshire, England
- Genres: Pop; indie rock; post-punk; jazz; electronic dance music
- Occupations: Singer, songwriter
- Labels: Atco; CBS Records; EMI; MCA
- Website: mary cigarettes – Soundcloud.com; mary cigarettes – YouTube

Gregory Gray (20 May 1959 – 25 April 2019), born Paul Lerwill, was a Northern Irish singer and songwriter. He began his career as a member of Rosetta Stone, a 1970s boy band, and became an influential cult musician who made indie music and videos under the pseudonym Mary Cigarettes. He published his work on online platforms such as YouTube and SoundCloud. During the course of his career his musical style ranged over an eclectic spectrum of pop, post-punk, indie rock, electronic dance music, jazz and folk.

His post-punk band Perfect Crime was a support act for U2, Eurythmics, Talking Heads, and Orchestral Manoeuvres in the Dark (OMD).

== Early life ==
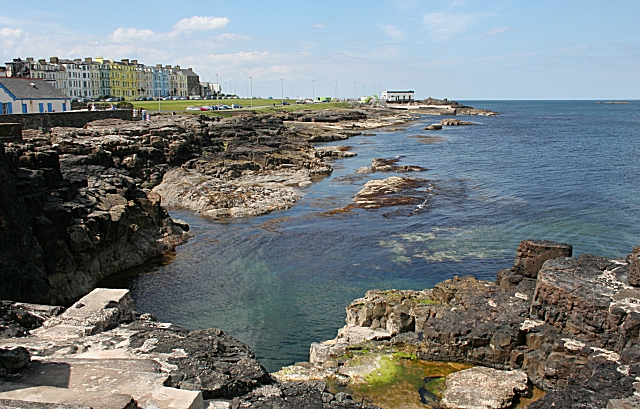
Portrush waterfront

Lerwill was born in Portrush, a seaside town in County Antrim, Northern Ireland, on 20 May 1959 as Paul Lerwill. His mother was English and his father was Anglo-Indian. He had three brothers and a sister. When Lerwill was 10 years old, the family moved to Singapore, where they lived at the RAF Changi airbase for three years, as his father was stationed there with the British Royal Air Force. It was there that he learned to play the guitar.

On returning to Portrush, as a 14-year-old he accompanied the "Singing Farmer" John Watt on the guitar in the Northern Star pub in Ballymoney, which Lerwill's father owned. He also worked in amusement arcades in Portrush and as a DJ in Kelly's, a local nightclub. When he left school at 16, he moved to Edinburgh, Scotland, where he worked as a DJ until he was 19.

== Recording career ==
Lerwill started his recording career as a guitarist with the boy band Rosetta Stone, originally called the Young City Stars, in 1979. The band was managed by Tam Paton, the former manager of the Bay City Rollers. Lerwill was a replacement for Ian Mitchell, who had performed with both the Bay City Rollers and Rosetta Stone.

He recorded with the band and spent two years touring around the world with it. Rosetta Stone's output was mainly cover versions of 1950s and 1960s pop hits. In the UK they appeared on the children's TV programme Crackerjack. The only country where they were very successful was Japan, where they performed sold-out shows in arenas that could accommodate 6,000 people.

In 1981, he left Rosetta Stone, returned to Northern Ireland, and changed his name to Gregory Gray to disassociate himself from his pop boy-band past.

=== Perfect Crime ===
Gray formed Perfect Crime, a four-piece post-punk band, for which he was the lead singer, guitarist, and songwriter, in 1981. The other original members of the group were Donal Boyle (guitar), George Nelson (bass), and Pete Kerr (drums). The group released two singles on MCA records, "Brave" in 1983 and "I Feel Like an Eskimo" in 1984, before breaking up in 1984. The band was promoted in the UK and gave performances on television. A rehearsal space was provided for the group by Dominican nuns in Portstewart.

The group was a support act for U2, Eurythmics, OMD, Talking Heads, and Paul Young. On their own, they toured the UK, often performing in university towns and small venues in rural Northern Ireland. In provincial regions, Gray's flamboyant style was often the target of hecklers, to whom he dealt sharp-witted put-downs.

Perfect Crime was an opening act for U2 on the first leg of the War Tour international concert tour on 28 March 1983 at the Nottingham Royal Concert Hall. Along with Steel Pulse, Big Country, Eurythmics, and Simple Minds, Perfect Crime performed before a crowd of 15,000 on 14 August 1983, at a nine-hour concert at Phoenix Park Racecourse, Dublin, when they were supporting U2 on a later leg of the War Tour. It was described by RTÉ as "the rock event of the year". Perfect Crime's set received positive press reviews.

=== Solo career ===
"Gregory Gray is of major significance ... because he has attempted to extend the Irish pop lexicon in important directions. Gray is also of interest as his music has articulated the diverse aspects of gay identity/ies as well as addressing gay audiences (though in no sense exclusively so) ... As [Ireland's] first 'out' gay pop performer, his story is of further interest as he has been virtually erased from the dominant discourse of Irish rock."

— McLaughlin, Noel; McLoone, Martin (2012) "Roads not taken? Gregory Gray" in Rock and Popular Music in Ireland: Before and After U2.

Gray was signed as a solo artist to CBS Records in 1985. His album Think of Swans was released in 1986. It was produced by Walter Samuel and featured the double-bass player Danny Thompson. Two singles, "Sensual" and "Books to Read Twice", were released from the album. A music video of "Sensual" was aired regularly on MTV. Gray made appearances on UK television and radio shows, including being interviewed by Eamonn Holmes and on The Dave Fanning Show. He toured venues in England and Northern Ireland. However, the album did not sell well enough, and his contract was cancelled the same year.

His second solo album, Strong at Broken Places, was produced by Davitt Sigerson and released by Atco Records, a subsidiary of PolyGram, in 1990. Sigerson became the CEO of EMI in 1994, and he signed Gray to that label, on which he released Euroflake in Silverlake in 1995. It was produced by Stephen Hague. Its title is a reference to the Silverlake gay district of Los Angeles. These two albums were released in the United States, mainland Europe, and East Asia, but not in the UK. They received favourable reviews in Rolling Stone and were popular on US student radio. They were a hit in Japan and sold well in southern Europe.

=== Mary Cigarettes ===
In the late 1990s, Gray and his partner moved from Northern Ireland to Hertfordshire on the outskirts of London, where they bought a home and built a music room where Gray created his own work independently. He began to make his work available for free on platforms such as SoundCloud and YouTube, under the deliberately ambiguous nom de plume Mary Cigarettes; he continued to use the name Gregory Gray in his personal life.

As Mary Cigarettes he became more adventurous and experimental, embracing a diverse range of styles, including indie pop and rock, techno, jazz, and folk. He collaborated with Fish Go Deep, a duo from Cork, creating electronic dance music. His music was admired by the British musician and radio presenter Tom Robinson, who played Mary Cigarettes' tracks on his programme on BBC Radio 6 Music.

In 2012, Noel McLaughlin, a senior lecturer in film, television, and popular music at the University of Northumbria, and Martin McLoone, emeritus professor in media studies at the University of Ulster, published the book Rock and Popular Music in Ireland Before and After U2 with a chapter dedicated to the work of Gray as a solo artist working under his own name, his work with Perfect Crime and his work under the Mary Cigarettes nom de plume.

== Musical style ==
During the course of his career, Gray's musical style ranged over an eclectic spectrum of pop, post-punk, indie rock, electronic dance music, jazz and folk.

== Personal life ==
While Gray (then Lerwill) was in Rosetta Stone he had a romantic relationship with Tam Paton, the band's manager, and became involved with a hedonistic social circle that included Freddie Mercury.

After leaving Rosetta Stone in 1981, he legally changed his name to Gregory Gray to put that period of his life behind him.

He came out publicly as gay in the mid-1980s; he was the first well-known Irish musician, north or south, to do so. Although he was openly gay and some of his songs and videos had gay themes, he didn't brand himself as a "gay artist" as he did not want to be constrained by labels. Nevertheless, he has been referred to as a "gay icon" in the media.

In the mid-1980s he bought a small, isolated farm and cottage on the North Antrim coast, which he used as a base for writing and recording. After being dropped from the CBS label in 1986, he retreated to the farm for several months.

After a short illness, Gregory Gray died on 25 April 2019, aged 59, at his home in Hertfordshire, England that he had shared with his partner for over 20 years. Following his wishes, he was cremated with no funeral service as he did not want anyone "crying over the coffin".

== Discography (selected) ==
Year	Title	Release format	Record label	Notes
1979	Caught in the Act	LP	EMI	As Paul Lerwill, with Rosetta Stone.
1983	"Brave"	Single	MCA Records	With Perfect Crime.
1984	"I Feel Like an Eskimo"	Single	MCA Records	With Perfect Crime.
1986	Think of Swans	LP	CBS Records	As Gregory Gray.
1990	Strong at Broken Places	CD	Atco Records	As Gregory Gray.
1990	"Don't Walk Away From Love"	Single	Atco Records	Released from the Strong at Broken Places album.
1995	Euroflake in Silverlake	CD	EMI	As Gregory Gray. With Guy Pratt as a session musician.
1995	"The Pope Does Not Smoke Dope"	Single	EMI	CD single released from the Euroflake in Silverlake album.
2006	"Nobody Really Knows"	YouTube video	Self-published on YouTube	As Mary Cigarettes.
2009	"Keep Your Powder Dry"	YouTube video	Self-published on YouTube	As Mary Cigarettes.
2009	"Burning Bridges That Never Really Mattered"	YouTube video	Self-published on YouTube	As Mary Cigarettes.
2010	"Whatever Turns You On"	MP3	Self-published on SoundCloud	As Mary Cigarettes.
2010	"Jimmy Page"	MP3	Self-published on SoundCloud	As Mary Cigarettes.
2010	"Failure and Redemption"	MP3	Self-published on SoundCloud	As Mary Cigarettes.
2010	"I Guess U Had 2 Be There"	MP3	Self-published on SoundCloud	As Mary Cigarettes.
2011	"In the Land of the Harley Davidson"	YouTube video	Self-published on YouTube	As Mary Cigarettes.
2012	"Next Years Ghost"	MP3	Self-published on SoundCloud	As Mary Cigarettes.
2012	"Middle Class White Trash Ways"	YouTube video	Self-published on YouTube	As Mary Cigarettes.
2013	"International House of Pancakes"	MP3	Self-published on SoundCloud	As Mary Cigarettes.
2014	"Madman in the Rain"	MP3	Self-published on SoundCloud	As Mary Cigarettes.
2015	"Hard Times Lately"	MP3	Self-published on SoundCloud	As Mary Cigarettes.
2016	"Full English Breakfast"	MP3	Self-published on SoundCloud	As Mary Cigarettes.
2018	"Time Is Not Cheap Anymore"	MP3	Self-published on SoundCloud	As Mary Cigarettes.
2018	"Big Fat Mouth"	MP3	Self-published on SoundCloud	As Mary Cigarettes.

== Bibliography ==
- McLaughlin, Noel; McLoone, Martin (2012) "Roads not taken? Gregory Gray" in Rock and Popular Music in Ireland: Before and After U2, Chapter 10, pp. 253–276. Dublin / Portland, Oregon: Irish Academic Press ISBN 978-0716530770
