= Georges (song) =

1977 single by Pat Simon

"George (Disco Tango)"

Single by Pat Simon
- B-side: "George (Disco Tango) Part II"
- Released: March 1977
- Recorded: 1976
- Genre: Chanson, pop
- Length: 3:18
- Label: Atlantic
- Songwriter(s): Thomas Strasser, Pat Simon, Colin Hall

Pat Simon singles chronology
"Itchy koo koo / Sprich nicht von Gestern" (1972)	"George (Disco Tango)" (1977)

Audio
- "George (Disco Tango)" on YouTube

"Georges"

Single by Sylvie Vartan

from the album Georges
- Language: French
- B-side: "Arrete de rire"
- Released: December 1977
- Recorded: 1977
- Genre: Chanson, pop
- Length: 3:25
- Label: RCA Victor
- Songwriter(s): Thomas Strasser, Pat Simon, Colin Hall, Pierre Billon, Michel Mallory
- Producer(s): Jacques Revaux

Sylvie Vartan singles chronology
"Petit rainbow" (1977)	"Georges" (1977)	"Disco Queen" (1978)

Music video
- "Georges" (French TV, 1977) "Georges" (French TV, 1978)

"George (Disco Tango)" is a song, originally released in English in 1977 by German female singer Pat Simon (born 1949) after a 5-year break in her career.

In the same year it was recorded in French (under the title "Georges") by Sylvie Vartan. Her version was included on her 1977 album of the same name and was also released as the aforementioned album's second and final single that same year.

== Background and writing ==
The original song was written by Thomas Strasser, Pat Simon and Colin Hall. It was adapted into French by Pierre Billon and Michel Mallory.

The Sylvie Vartan recording was produced by Jacques Revaux.

== Commercial performance ==
The Sylvie Vartan version reached at least the top 10 in France (according to the chart, courtesy of RTL Hit Parade, published in the "Hits of the World" section of the 21 January 1978 issue of U.S. Billboard).

== Track listings ==
=== Pat Simon version ===
7" single "George (Disco Tango) Part I + II" (1977, Germany, UK, Italy, France, Netherlands, etc.)

A. "George (Disco Tango) Part I" (3:18)
B. "George (Disco Tango) Part II" (3:08)

=== Sylvie Vartan version (in French) ===
7" single PB 8140 (France, Belgium, Portugal, etc.)

A. "Georges" ("Georges Disco Tango") (3:25)

written by C. Hall, M. Mallory, P. Simon, P. Billon, T. Strasser

B. "Arrete de rire" ("Sail On") (4:00)

written by J.M. Rivat, H. Warren
