= Take Me Now (song) =

1981 single by David Gates

Single by David Gates

from the album Take Me Now
- B-side: "It's What You Say"
- Released: September 1981
- Genre: Soft rock, pop
- Length: 3:18
- Label: Arista Records
- Songwriter: David Gates
- Producer: David Gates

David Gates singles chronology
"Where Does The Lovin' Go" (1980)	"Take Me Now" (1981)	"Come Home for Christmas" (1981)

"Take Me Now" is a song by American singer-songwriter David Gates. It is the title track of Gates' 1981 fifth solo album, and was the first of two singles released from the album.

== Personnel ==
- David Gates - guitar, bass
- Larry Knechtel - piano
- Paul Leim - drums

== Chart performance ==
The song reached number 62 on the US Billboard Hot 100 and peaked at number 15 on the Adult Contemporary chart in October 1981. It did best in Canada, where it spent two weeks at number nine on the Adult Contemporary chart.

== Actualization of views ==
"Take Me Now" experienced a significant resurgence in popularity during the 2010s, having accrued more than 50 million views on YouTube as of February 8, 2026.

== Chart performance ==
Chart (1981)	Peak position
Canada RPM Adult Contemporary	9
U.S. Billboard Hot 100	62
U.S. Billboard Adult Contemporary	15
