= Rollin' (Bay City Rollers album) =

1974 studio album

Studio album by Bay City Rollers
- Released: October 1974
- Recorded: 1973–1974
- Studio: Mayfair Studios, London
- Length: 36:56
- Label: Bell
- Producer: Phil Coulter; Bill Martin

Bay City Rollers chronology
Rollin' (1974)	Once Upon a Star (1975)

Singles from Rollin'
- 1. "Remember (Sha-La-La-La)" Released: 1974; 2. "Shang-a-Lang" Released: 1974; 3. "Summerlove Sensation" Released: 1974; 4. "Saturday Night" Released: August 1975

Rollin' is the debut album by the Scottish rock band the Bay City Rollers. Released in October 1974, it included the commercially successful singles "Remember (Sha-La-La-La)", "Shang-a-Lang" and "Summerlove Sensation". The album also featured the song "Saturday Night" which was released as the fourth and final single from the album, but the song did not chart in the UK. "Saturday Night" was later released in North America in 1975 and reached number 1 on the US Billboard Hot 100. Rollin' was produced by Phil Coulter and Bill Martin, released via Bell Records, and achieved commercial success internationally, reaching the top ten in Australia as well as the top twenty in Finland.

The album debuted in December 1974 atop the albums charts in the United Kingdom, later becoming certified Platinum by the British Phonographic Industry (BPI) for sales in excess of 300,000 copies, and it finished 1975 as the sixteenth-best-selling album of the year in the United Kingdom. While the album itself was not released in the US, several of its songs would later appear on the band's US album debut Bay City Rollers.

== Background ==
The Bay City Rollers were formed in Edinburgh, the capital city of Scotland, in 1964, with the city being described as "being no different" to other cities as a result of the popularity of bands including the Beatles and the Rolling Stones leading to an increase in bands forming in an attempt to become commercially successful. Band member Alan Longmuir recalled that after seeing a performance of the Beatles on Thank Your Lucky Star and Ready Steady Go, it was then he set his desire in being part of band. Similarly, what was described as the "rock and roll bug" had affected future members of the Bay City Rollers such as Derek Longmuir, who at fourteen years old had his first experience of in music during the Boy's Brigade. Longmuir had a desire to learn the drums.

During this period, the band were going by the name the Ambassadors, and made their debut as a band together at a family wedding reception with a rendition of "Wake Up Little Susie" by the Everly Brothers. During their time at Tynecastle Secondary School, Derek Longmuir befriended Gordon "Nobby" Clark who was a member of the school choir at the time, something which caught the attention of Derek Longmuir and similarly Clark, who had noticed that Longmuir had a musical interest which was similar to his. Clark recalled that he "did not know that Derek had a band", and that he remembered him "tapping away with his pencil in science class". The Ambassadors needed a lead singer for their band, and consequently, they asked Clark to join the band in which he accepted. The band later changed their name to the Saxons and advertised for a rhythm guitarist in the local newspaper in which Dave Pettigrew responded and auditioned for the band, being successful and later joining the line up of the band as their rhythm guitarist.

The bands first performance in front of an audience was at the Cairns Church Club, with Alan Longmuir later admitting that prior to the show he felt extreme nerves as the band "did not feel sure of ourselves". During this period, the band had become aware that image was important if they were to become successful, and they established their "own image" and changed their name again, citing that "American music was really taking off in the clubs" and they felt it would be beneficial to adopt a name "which reflected that vibe". Derek Longmuir pinned a map of the United States on a wall and began to pin a tag on a "random place" in an attempt to find a new name for the band. He later recalled that it "landed on some crappy place, so we did it again". It then landed on Bay City, and after a few more attempts, it was the name that "was the best sounding of them all". The band were set on calling themselves the Bay City Stompers, but Alan Longmuir suggested Bay City Rollers as an accolade to the Detroit Wheels. The band secured a performance at the acclaimed Toy Story Club in Edinburgh, something Alan Longmuir later claimed was "the break the band really needed".

During their performance at the Toy Story Club, they gained the attention of music manager Tam Paton, who the band described as "the most important music manager in Edinburgh". Paton began working with the band, agreeing to get them more work around Edinburgh, becoming a publicity master for the band and was an actively paying people to spray paint the Bay City Rollers name on as many overpasses around Edinburgh as possible. One such "billboard" was spray painted at Princes Street Gardens, with the band later being charged and were required to clean up.

== Development and recording ==
In 1970, the band performed at the Cave Club in Edinburgh and was witnessed by Tony Calder (the head of Bell Records), Dick Leahy, and talent agent David Apps. They were advised to show no interest in the band by friends who referred to the band as "rubbish" and having "no energy", however, the three were curious about the attention the band were getting and travelled to watch them perform again, and following the performance, Calder approached their manager, Tam Paton, and told him that he wished to sign the band to Bell Records. In an attempt to show that the band had appeal to a larger audience outside their home city of Edinburgh, Paton scheduled a performance in Dundee in early 1971, with Calder providing a filming crew for the performance and a commitment to signing the band to a production and development deal if the performance went well. After a successful performance, the band were asked to attend a demo recording session at Olympic Studios; however, the sessions were cancelled as a result of Bell Records having not paid Olympic Studios in advance.

The Bay City Rollers performing "Summerlove Sensation" in 1974

Leahy "stepped up" and agreed to sign the band to a "proper recording contract" with Bell Records without the need for a demo recording. Lead singer, Nobby Clark, thought that the record deal they had been offered was unsatisfactory, and as a result, he refused to agree to the terms of the contract. The contract offered each member of the band 4% of any profits made from record sales, however, Clark advised the label that he "was not happy with that part". A 24 hour "stalemate" occurred, and Paton considered replacing Clark in the band as a result of his actions. Clark later signed the deal after negotiations which saw the bands offering of profit intake double from 4% to 8% on any record sales, with a £5,000 production advance.

Jonathan King was drafted in by Bell Records for early recording sessions and produced their first single "Keep on Dancing". Clark recalled that King was an individual who "you did not really work with, rather he tells you what to do and you do it" and later claimed that "Keep on Dancing" on featured one band member and the rest was King. In total, four songs were recorded under the production direction of King, including a cover version of "We Can Make Music" by Tommy Roe which was originally intended to be released as the bands debut single. With an exceeding of the allocated studio time and assigned budget, King finished his sessions with the band despite their being a desire from Bell Records for him to continue his production work.

After the release of preceding singles "Remember" and "Shang-a-Lang", the band decided to embark on a short holiday before beginning work on the album. The band became unsatisfied with the refusal of their record company to allow them to write the b-sides to be included on single releases. Bell Records told the band that only one space would be left on the album for an original composition, a statement which saw Eric Manclark almost leave the band unless the "statement was redressed and changed in a hurry". Following a series of discussions and meeting on the matter, Bell Records finally changed their minds and allowed the band to include a total of four original compositions on the album instead of the originally allocated one. The band returned to Mayfair Studios in London in August 1974 and were given only six days to record the remaining songs for the album.

== Production ==
Following the failures commercially of subsequent single releases including "We Can Make Music" and "Mañana" in 1972, a change in production team was suggested by Bell Records executives. By this time, a change in production team would mean that in the space of just over a year, the band would be onto their third production team. Bill Martin and Phil Coulter were selected as producers. Coulter assured the bands manager, Tam Paton, that despite being their third production team in a short period, that both he and Martin had "found" the correct material for the band to record and assured him that it would improves the bands commercial success. During production sessions, the band convened at Mayfair Studios in London and recorded four songs written by both Martin and Coulter including "Saturday Night", "Remember (Sha-La-La-La)", "Hey CB" and "Shang-a-Lang".

Lead singer, Nobby Clark, thought that the songs presented by both Martin and Coulter were "stronger", and he would become the only member of the band to request to feature on the tape. Martin claimed that "Saturday Night" was unusual as a result of Coulter being absent from the sessions due to illness, leaving him to write the song with another writer, John Drummond. Following the release of "Saturday Night" as the first single from the album and its subsequent commercial failure in the United Kingdom, the exeucutive of Bell Records, Dick Leahy remained committed to the production and songwriting efforts of both Coulter and Martin, claiming that he was "assured they were the right combination for the band".

== Release and promotion ==
Professional ratings
Review scores
Source	Rating
AllMusic	4/5 stars
Džuboks	mixed

=== Non–album releases ===
"Keep on Dancing", although not included on the final pressing of the album, was released as the band’s first single in May 1974 and was released to critical praise, with Peter Jones from Record Mirror saying the song was a "very commercial record indeed". To promote the release, the Bay City Rollers performed across Scotland and hoped that the record release would be noticed in England, where the band remained relatively unknown. The single was slow to gain any ground or attention until Chris Denning, the plugger for Bell Records and former BBC Radio 1 presenter, made it his "number one promotion priority". As a result, four months following its official release, "Keep on Dancing" debuted at number twenty-four on the national singles charts in the United Kingdom in September 1974, before reaching its peak of number nine in November 1974. "Saturday Night" was released as the first single from Rollin in June 1973 after a commitment from Dick Leahy to support the single release. Despite the backing of both Leahy and the record label, the release did not perform as well as expected on the singles charts in the United Kingdom.

=== Bell Records concerns ===
The recent lack of commercial success for the band did not go unnoticed by their record label, Bell, with Leahy phoning the band’s manager, Tam Paton, to request an "immediate meeting" in London. Paton was expecting the band to be dropped from the label as a result of their failure to replicate the success of "Keep on Dancing", however, Leahy advised that he was willing to support one more single release but claimed "that would be it" if the next single did not perform well commercially. "Remember (Sha-La-La-La)" was released as the bands second single from the album, with Paton assuring the band he would "do everything" to make sure the record became commercially successful and save the band from being released from their contract with Bell Records.

=== Line–up changes ===
Despite assurances from Paton, the band were in low spirits and did not believe the record would be a commercial success, and lead singer Nobby Clark had already decided that, as a result, he would be leaving the band after finishing touring commitments with the band in Ireland. "Remember (Sha-La-La-La)" marked a return to prominence and commercial success for the band, debuting at number forty-seven on the singles charts in the United Kingdom on 9 February 1974, before reaching its peak position of number six on 9 March 1974.

Given the success of the release, Paton believed that Clark may change his decision about leaving the band, and "begged" him to appear with the band on Top of the Pops to perform the song. Whilst Clark agreed to do the performance on Top of the Pops, Paton believed this was a signal that he had changed his mind about leaving the band, and was hopeful this would be the case for an upcoming show scheduled in Perth, however, Clark refused to perform at the concert and thereafter officially left the band. As previously arranged between manager Tam Paton and departing frontman Gordon Clark, Clark had flown to London to appear in the recording for the Top of the Pops broadcast, but was later advised that a "special arrangement" had been made and that the segment had already been recorded without the involvement of Clark.

Clark was later replaced by Les McKeown as lead singer of the band, with McKeown re-recording vocals on tracks already recorded by Clark including "Remember" and "Saturday Night". The next single, "Shang-a-Lang" continued the band's commercial success, selling an estimated 630,000 copies per day and reached number two in the United Kingdom. Bell Records began accepting pre-order requests for Rollin in September ahead of its official release in October 1974. The album debuted on the national albums chart in the United Kingdom at number one on 12 October 1974, and spent a total of four weeks at the top spot.

== Track listing ==
=== Side one ===
1. "Shang-a-Lang" (Phil Coulter, Bill Martin) – 3:07
2. "Give It to Me Now" (Coulter, Martin) – 3:48
3. "Angel Angel" (Eric Faulkner, Stuart "Woody" Wood) – 2:27
4. "Be My Baby" (Jeff Barry, Ellie Greenwich, Phil Spector) – 3:27
5. "Just a Little Love" (Faulkner, Wood) – 2:57
6. "Remember (Sha-La-La-La)" (Coulter, Martin) – 2:33

=== Side two ===
1. "Saturday Night" (Coulter, Martin) – 2:57
2. "Ain't It Strange" (Les McKeown) – 2:10
3. "Please Stay" (Burt Bacharach, Bob Hilliard) – 3:54
4. "Jenny Gotta Dance" (Coulter, Martin) – 3:06
5. "There Goes My Baby" (Faulkner, Wood) – 3:18
6. "Summerlove Sensation" (Coulter, Martin) – 3:12

== 2004 UK reissue ==
A 2004 CD reissue on Bell included four bonus tracks: "Are You Ready for That Rock and Roll" (the original B-side of the "Shang-a-Lang" single); "Bringing Back the Good Times" (B-side of "Summerlove Sensation"); "Bye Bye Barbara" (B-side of "Remember"); and "Hey C.B." which was the B-side of the original UK "Saturday Night" single, released in June 1973 and recorded with Nobby Clark and John Devine before McKeown and Wood had joined the band. Unusually, this original recording of "Saturday Night" was not included on this reissue, but has been included on subsequent compilations.

== Personnel ==
Musicians

- Les McKeown – vocals, guitar
- Eric Faulkner – guitar, violin, mandolin, bass
- Stuart "Woody" Wood – guitar, bass, piano, mandolin
- Alan Longmuir – bass, accordion, piano
- Derek Longmuir – drums, congas, tambourine

Production

- Phil Coulter: arrangement and production
- Bill Martin: production

== Charts ==
=== Weekly charts ===
Chart (1974)	Peak position
Australian Albums (Kent Music Report)	8
Canadian Albums (RPM)	29
Finnish Albums (Suomen virallinen lista)	18
Japanese Albums (Oricon)	37
New Zealand Albums (RIANZ)	27
UK Albums (OCC)	1
Zimbabwean Albums (ZIMA)	15

=== Year-end charts ===
Chart (1975)	Position
UK Albums (OCC)	16
