= Shang-a-Lang (song) =

Single by Bay City Rollers

from the album Rollin'
- B-side: "Are You Ready For That Rock & Roll"
- Released: April 1974
- Genre: Glam rock
- Length: 3:05
- Label: Bell
- Songwriters: Bill Martin, Phil Coulter
- Producers: Bill Martin, Phil Coulter

Bay City Rollers singles chronology
"Remember (Sha-La-La-La)" (1974)	"Shang-a-Lang" (1974)	"Summerlove Sensation" (1974)

"Shang-a-Lang" is a single released by Scottish band the Bay City Rollers, taken from their debut album Rollin' (1974), from which it was the second advance single. The song was written and produced by Bill Martin and Phil Coulter, and released via Bell Records. The song has been credited as being the "closest both Martin and Coulter ever came to replicating Phil Spector", who was a considerable influence on the song's production and musical arrangement.

== Background ==
Songwriter Bill Martin described "Shang-a-Lang" as an attempt to combine Brill Building songwriting - in particular the partly onomatopoeic lines of "Da Doo Ron Ron" - with the clanging sounds he'd long heard emanating from the shipyards in the Glasgow burgh of Govan where he'd been born and raised. According to Bill Martin: "I couldn't write clang clang because [of the well-known] Judy Garland [song lyric from] 'Trolley Song': 'Clang clang clang went the trolley'. So eventually I came up with: 'We sang shang-a-lang'". Martin also recalled "shang-a-lang" as a minced oath he'd been wont to use when his mother was in earshot. Martin's collaborator Phil Coulter created the track's clapping sound by hitting two pieces of wood together as he had in their 1970 writing success, "Back Home", by the England football team.

== Recording ==
The song was recorded at Mayfair Studios in London and was one of four songs written by both Martin and Coulter alongside "Saturday Night", "Remember (Sha-La-La-La)" and "Hey CB". Following its release, the band decided to embark on a short holiday before beginning work on the album. The band became unsatisfied with the refusal of their record company to allow them to write the b-sides to be included on single releases.

Bell Records told the band that only one space would be left on the album for an original composition, a statement which saw Eric Manclark almost leave the band unless the "statement was redressed and changed in a hurry". Following a series of discussions and meeting on the matter, Bell Records finally changed their minds and allowed the band to include a total of four original compositions on the album instead of the originally allocated one. The band returned to Mayfair Studios in London in August 1974 and were given only six days to record the remaining songs for the album.

== Writing and production ==
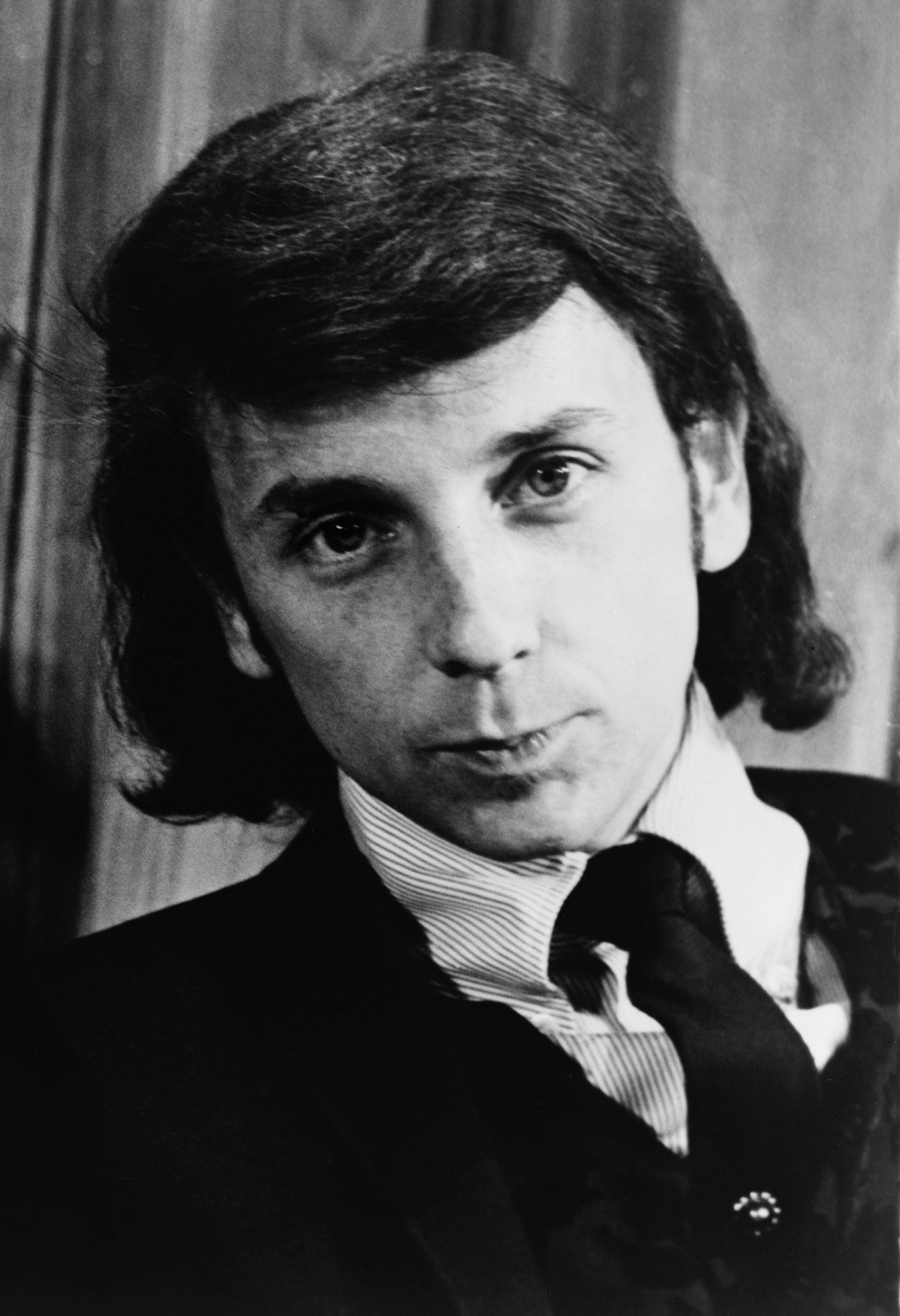
American producer Phil Spector (pictured in 1965) was a considerable influence on Martin and Coulter during the production of "Shang-a-Lang"

Produced by Bill Martin and Phil Coulter, "Shang-a-Lang" was described by Coulter in his 2019 autobiography Brusied, Never Broken, as his favourite Bay City Rollers song despite fears he had about the single performing commercially amongst fierce competition. He later acknowledged that, whilst the single performed well following its release, his "fears became true" as a result of the single being prevented from taking the number one position in the singles charts in the United Kingdom.

Around the time of writing and producing the song, the band's manager, Tam Paton, was described as someone who implemented a "bit of a musical chairs situation" with reserve band members in case one of the permanent band members "stepped out of line" and could be replaced immediately. Following the release of their preceding single, original lead singer, Nobby Clark, decided to leave the band. Clark was replaced by Les McKeown, who was described by Phil Coulter as "having a pleasing quality in his voice which can't be taught or learned"; Coulter said that he was "delighted" when McKeown joined the band. He further added that McKeown was the "biggest contributor to the records becoming hits". By the time the Bay City Rollers had travelled to London for the recording sessions, "Shang-a-Lang" had already been recorded by Coulter and a number of session musicians, leaving the band to only provide their vocals and harmonies for the track. Described as something which was a natural occurrence in production at the time, Coulter was left unimpressed by individuals who were brought into provide backing harmonies, leaving him to assist in backing vocals once McKeown had laid down the lead vocals. On the fade out of the song's chorus, Coulter can be heard singing in a high-pitched falsetto register, providing a counter-melody for the song.

The song was influenced heavily by "Da Doo Ron Ron" by the band the Crystals, which was produced by Phil Spector, and also drew influence for "Shang-a-Lang" from the sound of shipyards on the River Clyde in Glasgow he could recall from when he was a child. Lyrically, "Shang-a-Lang" focuses on themes of nostalgia and early pop music. Bill Martin said that, when he was younger, he would get into trouble from his mother if he swore, so instead of swearing he would say "aw, shang-a-lang" so he would not get into trouble. He later attributed this memory for his own inspiration towards the song. Some have argued that the song was also inspired by gang violence in Scotland at the time, particularly around Glasgow. The song has been accredited as "the strongest lyrics and backing track" to be recorded by the Bay City Rollers, and has been described by Simon Spence as "the closest Coulter and Martin ever got to Phil Spector".

== Release and promotion ==
"Shang-a-Lang" was officially released in April 1974 and continued the bands commercial success, selling an estimated 630,000 copies per day and reached number two in the United Kingdom. "Shang-a-Lang" was Bay City Roller's fifth single release and their third to place in the UK charts, its tenure being ten weeks in the spring of 1974 with a peak of number 2 being held off from the number 1 position by another nostalgic track: "Sugar Baby Love" by The Rubettes.

The band debuted the song on national television in the United Kingdom on the Granada television show 45 in April 1974. For the performance, the band decided to "drop the football shirts and tartan", instead opting for white trousers and jumpers. At the same time, David Bridger from the bands record label, Bell Records, was heavily involved in promoting the single, something Dick Leahy from the label later described as "being out of control". The single was added to the top playlist on BBC Radio 1 in the United Kingdom and also received strong airplay from Radio Luxembourg. As a result, Bell Records had grown to become one of the most influential record companies in the United Kingdom.

Ahead of its release, "Shang-a-Lang" was anticipated by music critics to become a commercial success for the band, with many waiting in anticipation to establish just how successful the single would become. On the backdrop of strong promotion and publicity for the single, the Bay City Rollers were scheduled for a performance on Top of the Pops for the BBC to be broadcast on 18 April 1974, however, on the day prior to the planned recording for the show, Alan and Derek Longmuir's mother died of a heart attack. Despite this, the band fulfilled their recording obligation for Top of the Pops and travelled to London to record the show. Promotion for the single release continued to run into May 1974, and the band appeared on Top of the Pops a further three times as a result of the singles dominance on the singles charts in the United Kingdom. The song went onto sell over 250,000 copies in the United Kingdom alone, and was subsequently certified Silver by the British Phonographic Industry (BPI).

"Shang-a-Lang" would be the first Bay City Rollers single released in Canada where the group would soon become massively popular. However the original "Shang-a-Lang" was expediently covered by Montreal-based session group Tinker's Moon whose version charted at #52 in Canada: the Tinker's Moon version also gave "Shang-a-Lang" what attention the song would receive in the US reaching number 111 on the Record World Singles Chart 101 - 150. The band went on to use the title for their TV series, which began in April 1975, and ran for twenty-one episodes.

== Track listing ==
1. "Shang-a-Lang" – 3:04
2. "Are You Ready For That Rock & Roll" – 3:26

== Legacy ==
Gold Radio ranked "Shang-a-Lang" as the 3rd best Bay City Rollers song of all time in 2021. In 2024, the song was described as a "true Scottish anthem", and a song that has since "segmented the Scottish music sound", being described as a composition that has a "brilliant Scottishness to it". Band member Woody described the song as "always being an anthemic type song with the chord structure and the chanting as well as the happiness", something he attributed to the song becoming successful.

== 2024 re–release ==
The song was re–released in 2024 to raise money for charity, Cash for Kids, and to also commemorate the bands 50th anniversary and the Scotland national football team's qualification for the UEFA Euro 2024 football competition. The re–released version featured artists including Susan Boyle and Rod Stewart. The idea to re–record and subsequently re–release the song came from an interview on Ewen and Cat at Breakfast on Greatest Hits Radio in Scotland after a suggestion by Ewen Cameron. Following the release, Cameron said the "response has been amazing" to the release of the 2024 version. The band performed the 2024 version before a football match against Scotland and Northern Ireland.

== Charts ==
=== Weekly charts, 1974 ===
Chart (1974)	Peak position
German Singles (GfK)	41
Australian Singles (Kent Music Report)	28
Belgium Singles (Ultratop)	28
Ireland Singles (IRMA)	16
Norway Singles (VG-lista)	10
UK Singles (Official Charts)	2

=== Weekly charts, 2021 ===
Chart (2021)	Peak position
UK Singles Sales (OCC)	20
UK Download Singles (OCC)	19

== Certifications ==
Region	Certification	Certified units/sales
United Kingdom (BPI)	Silver	250,000^{^}
^{^} Shipments figures based on certification alone.

== See also ==
- Shang-a-Lang
