= Remember (Sha-La-La-La) =

Single by Bay City Rollers

from the album Rollin'
- Released: 1974
- Studio: Mayfair Studios, London
- Genre: Glam rock
- Length: 2:31
- Label: Bell
- Songwriter(s): Phil Coulter, Bill Martin
- Producer(s): Phil Coulter, Bill Martin

Bay City Rollers singles chronology
| "Manana" (1972) | "Remember (Sha-La-La-La)" (1974) | "Shang-a-Lang" (1974) |

"Remember (Sha-La-La-La)" is a song by the Scottish band Bay City Rollers. It was first released as a single in early 1974 and then included on their debut album Rollin', which appeared several months later, in the autumn. With concerns over the bands future from their record label, Bell Records, the song was "perfunctory" released by the label. Despite a decision being made to drop the band from the record label following the release of the single, it became a commercial success for the band, peaking at no. 6 on the UK Singles Chart, and secured a future for the band on the label.

== Background ==
The song was recorded at Mayfair Studios in London, and was given a "perfunctory release" in the United Kingdom as a consequence of the decision by Dick Leahy, the manager of Bell Records, to drop the band from the label following its release. Bell Records showed no real enthusiasm for the song, leaving the bands manager Tam Paton to visit Leahy and "beg him" to give the band "one last chance", later claiming that he believed Leahy only agreed to do so because he "felt sorry" for him.

By the end of 1972, original lead singer, Gordon "Nobby" Clark had become disillusioned with the band's musical direction and decided to leave the band, ultimately being replaced as lead singer by Les McKeown who re-recorded lead vocals on the song in late 1973, marking the beginning of a period of commercial success for the band. Given the success of the release, manager Tam Paton believed that Clark may change his decision about leaving the band, and "begged" him to appear with the band on Top of the Pops to perform the song. Whilst Clark agreed to do the performance on Top of the Pops, Paton believed this was a signal that he had changed his mind about leaving the band, and was hopeful this would be the case for an upcoming show scheduled in Perth, however, Clark refused to perform at the concert and thereafter officially left the band.

In February 1974, 16-year-old Stuart Wood completed the "classic five" line-up, a week after the band had debuted the "Remember" single on Top of the Pops. The "classic five" line-up consisted of: Alan Longmuir, Derek Longmuir, Stuart "Woody" Wood, Eric Faulkner and Les McKeown. Following the release of "Remember (Sha-La-La-La)" the bands popularity increased rapidly, releasing a series of commercially successful singles in the United Kingdom, including "Shang-a-Lang", "Summerlove Sensation", and "All of Me Loves All of You".

== Composition ==
The band, primarily Clark and Eric Faulkner were "less than impressed" with the lyrical composition of the song, with Clark saying he "wasn't overly excited by the lyrics", but claimed that when producer Phil Coulter sang the song over the backing track he "loved it" and believed that the band "could be onto something here" with the song. Faulkner disagreed, and began embroiled in a heated exchange over the lyrics, particularly "Sha La La Shooby Do Eh", asking "you honestly want us to sing that", in which he was advised was correct. Coulter later claimed that his firm belief was that such lyrics would not secure the band a Pulitzer Prize nomination, however, this was not the intention and rather the focus was on the band selling records.

Coulter and Bill Martin had essentially "written two songs" when writing the song, with Martin claiming he had written "we used to sing along", whilst Coulter added lyrics including "sha la la" to the song. Martin later claimed that, despite assumptions that the pair had a songwriting partnership, Coulter was the lyricists between the two, whilst Martin provided ideas and shared them with Coulter who would then transcribe them into lyrics.

== Release ==
Upon its release, the single became a strong seller for the band, beginning with selling 200 copies per day and reaching 1,400 shortly after its release, becoming the "star breaker" of the week despite the song charting outwith the top forty in the United Kingdom initially. By February 1974, the single was selling roughly 5,000 copies per day in the United Kingdom and by March 1974, it had sold 250,000 copies in the United Kingdom alone. As a result of the singles success in the British market, Bell Records "rushed" the singles release in territories including Australia, France and Germany. The song debuted on the UK Singles Charts at number forty-seven, before climbing into the top 40 the following week, where it appeared at number thirty-eight on 16 February 1974. It continued to climb the charts in the United Kingdom, eventually reaching its peak position of number six on 9 March 1974. It addition to its success commercially in the United Kingdom, "Remember (Sha-La-La-La)" peaked at number thirty-seven in Germany.

The song spent a combined total of twelve weeks within the top 100 of the singles charts in the United Kingdom, and in 2021 was ranked as the fifth best Bay City Rollers song of all time by Gold Radio.

== Promotion ==
A scheduled appearance from the band to perform the song on BBC children's television programme Crackerjack was cancelled as a result of broadcasters having to cease broadcasting at 10:30pm in the United Kingdom to "conserve energy" during the national recession in which the government had declared a "national emergency" over. Despite this, the band were able to record their appearance for Top of the Pops, as this was filmed on a Tuesday rather than a Wednesday evening and was therefore unaffected by the 10:30pm broadcasting curfew which had been implemented. As previously arranged between manager Tam Paton and departing frontman Gordon Clark, Clark had flown to London to appear in the recording for the Top of the Pops broadcast, but was later advised that a "special arrangement" had been made and that the segment had already been recorded without the involvement of Clark.

The band appeared on the front cover of Record Mirror and featured in Jackie magazine as part of the promotional schedule for the release of the single. Their planned appearance on Crackerjack to promote the single was finally rescheduled, with an additional appearance on The Basil Brush Show performing the song.

== Track listings ==
7" single Bell 2008 229 (1974, Germany)

1. "Remember" (2:33)
2. "Bye Bye Barbara" (2:55)

== Chart performance ==
| Chart (1974) | Peak position |
|---|---|
| German Singles (GfK) | 37 |
| UK Singles (OCC) | 6 |
