= The Peppers =

- Origin: France
- Genres: Disco, Funk, Experimental
- Years active: 1973–1974
- Label: Sirocco
- Past members: Mat Camison, Pierre-Alain Dahan, Tonio Rubio, Jean Schulteis

The Peppers were a French male instrumental group who had a hit single in 1974 with "Pepper Box". The song reached number 6 in the UK Singles Chart, and was a minor hit on the US Soul and Hot 100 charts.

== Discography ==
=== Albums ===
A Taste Of Pepper, A Taste Of Honey / Pepper Box (1974) - AUS #25

=== Singles ===
- "Pepper Box" / "A Pinch Of Salt" (1973–74) #6 (UK), #76 (US Hot 100), #34 (US Soul)
- "Do It, Do It" / "Hot Caramel"/"Just a Rock"
- "Hot Caramel" / "Blue Ballade"
- "Doctor Music" / "Blue Ballad"
