= Dance with the Devil (instrumental) =

Single by Cozy Powell

Single by Cozy Powell
- B-side: "And Then There Was Skin"
- Released: 26 October 1973 (UK)
- Recorded: 1973
- Genre: Glam rock; progressive rock
- Length: 3:37
- Label: Rak (UK); Chrysalis (US)
- Songwriters: Phil Dennys & Michael Hayes (Mickie Most's birth name)
- Producer: Mickie Most

"Dance with the Devil" is a solo drum instrumental by Cozy Powell based on the song "Third Stone from the Sun" by Jimi Hendrix. It was recorded as Cozy Powell's session work for Rak Records was taking off, and as his band Bedlam was finishing. The bass player on the track is Suzi Quatro. The track was retitled "Dance with the Drums" for its release in South Africa, and UK pressings issued for export to Denmark and Belgium came in picture sleeves, some on blue vinyl.

It reached No. 3 in the UK Singles Chart in January 1974. The track was Powell's only entry on the US Hot 100.

== Charts ==
Chart (1973/74)	Peak Position
Australia (Kent Music Report)	22
Canada (RPM)	48
United Kingdom (Official Charts Company)	3
US Billboard Hot 100	49

== Samples ==
- The song (and the background shouts) forms the basis for the intro of the song "Rasputin" and "Nightflight to Venus" by the group Boney M.
- Part of the song was used in Right Said Fred's song "I'm Too Sexy".

== Cover versions ==
- The song was later covered by drummer Mark Edwards (Steeler, Third Stage Alert, Lion) and released on his all-instrumental EP Code of Honor in 1985.
- In 2014, Salford band Trojan Horse recorded a cover version of the song for the B-side of their single "Meat Eater", which was released on the RAK Records label which had been reactivated briefly as a record club label. It also qualified as "Single Of The Week" in The Guardian.
