= Take Me Now =

Studio album by David Gates
- Released: August 1981
- Genre: Soft rock
- Length: 32:59
- Label: Arista; Pony Records
- Producer: David Gates

David Gates chronology
Falling in Love Again (1980)	Take Me Now (1981)	Love Is Always Seventeen (1994)

Singles from Take Me Now
- 1. "Take Me Now" Released: September 1981

Professional ratings
Review scores
Source	Rating
AllMusic	2/5 stars
The Encyclopedia of Popular Music	2/5 stars

Take Me Now is a solo album by David Gates of Bread.

The album peaked at #62 on the Billboard chart.

== Critical reception ==
Billboard praised the title track, calling it "an attractive midtempo ballad that's more upbeat than [Gates's] seamless pop classics of the early '70s."

== Track listing ==
All tracks composed by David Gates except where noted

1. "It's You" - 3:47
2. "Take Me Now" - 3:23
3. "She's a Heartbreaker" - 2:36
4. "This Could Be Forever" - 3:23
5. "Come Home for Christmas" - 3:07
6. "Still in Love" (Hadley Hockensmith, Kelly Willard, David Gates) - 3:18
7. "Vanity" - 3:15
8. "Nineteen on the Richter Scale" - 3:31
9. "Lady Valentine" - 3:34
10. "It's What You Say" - 3:05

== Personnel ==
- David Gates - acoustic guitar (1, 4); guitar (2, 3, 10), bass (1, 2, 3, 4, 7); all instruments (5); keyboards (7); slide guitar (8); piano (9)
- Hadley Hockensmith - lead guitar (1, 3, 7, 8); electric guitar (4, 6); bass (6)
- Larry Knechtel - Fender Rhodes electric piano (1, 4); piano (2, 8); keyboards (3, 10); bass (9, 10)
- Paul Leim - drums (1–4, 6, 8–10); percussion (4)
- Mike Botts - drums (7)
- Craig Gates - percussion (4)
- Tom Scott - alto saxophone (4)
- Chuck Findley - flugelhorn (9)
- Dick Hyde - bass trumpet (9)
