= Summerlove Sensation =

1974 single by the Bay City Rollers

Single by Bay City Rollers

from the album Rollin'
- B-side: "Bringing Back The Good Times"
- Released: 26 July 1974
- Recorded: 1974
- Genre: Glam rock
- Length: 3:17
- Label: Bell
- Songwriters: Phil Coulter, Bill Martin
- Producers: Phil Coulter, Bill Martin

Bay City Rollers singles chronology
"Shang-A-Lang" (1974)	"Summerlove Sensation" (1974)	"All of Me Loves All of You" (1974)

Music video
- "Summerlove Sensation" (TopPop, 1974) on YouTube

"Summerlove Sensation" is a single released by Scottish band the Bay City Rollers, featured on their debut album Rollin' (1974). In the same year, it was released as a single five months prior. The single peaked at no. 3 on the UK Singles Chart. It also spawned two successful cover versions in the late 1970s, first a French adaption performed by French pop singer Sylvie Vartan, and a cover by American singer Bobby Vinton that was a minor hit in the charts.

== Release and promotion ==
The band debuted the song on national television in the United Kingdom on Lift Off with Ayshea broadcast on Granada Television where they performed the song alongside "Shang-a-Lang" on 29 July 1974. Upon its release, "Summerlove Sensentation" became what was known as a "star breaker" in the United Kingdom, and the band were scheduled to perform the song on Top of the Pops. A dispute between Top of the Pops and the Musicians Union in the United Kingdom over the BBC's decision to have artists appear on the show and mime to backing tracks forced the show to be taken from broadcasting schedules for a number of weeks, ultimately meaning the band did not get the chance to perform the song on the show.

"Summerlove Sensation" was used as a "play out track" on a Top of the Pops broadcast on 8 August 1974, and as a result the single began to climb the national singles charts in the United Kingdom despite initially missing the top forty of the charts following its release in July. As a result of its increasing chart success, the band travelled to London to record a performance for Top of the Pops which was broadcast on 15 August 1974. At this time, it was considered by the bands manager Tam Paton and their record label that further promotion of the single would be unnecessary as the single was "destined" to be successful regardless, and with the exception of one further performance on Top of the Pops on 22 August 1974, no additional performances for national television of the song occurred.

== Charts ==
Chart (1974)	Peak position
Australia (Kent Music Report)	53
Ireland (IRMA)	5
UK Singles (OCC)	3

== Sylvie Vartan version (in French) ==
"Petit rainbow"

Single by Sylvie Vartan

from the album Georges
- Language: French
- English title: Little rainbow
- B-side: "Bla bla bla"
- Released: August 1977
- Genre: Pop, disco
- Length: 3:33
- Label: RCA Victor
- Songwriters: Phil Coulter, Bill Martin, Pierre Grillet
- Producer: Jacques Revaux

Sylvie Vartan singles chronology
"Masculin singulier" (1977)	"Petit rainbow" (1977)	"Georges" (1977)

Music video
- "Petit rainbow" (French TV, 1978) on YouTube

The song was later reworked into French under the title "Petit rainbow" (meaning "Little rainbow"). It was recorded by Sylvie Vartan and released in August 1977 as the lead single off of her 1977 studio album Georges. In France her version of the song spent one week at no. 1 on the singles sales chart (from 7 to 13 October 1977). The song also reached Number 1 on the French Belgian charts for two weeks in 1977, charting in Belgium from 17 September to 24 December 1977. The song was also adapted into German from French by Michael Kunze as "Ein kleines Herz auf der Haut" (English: "A little heart on the skin", French: "Un petit coeur sur la peau") in 1978 but failed to chart.

=== Track listing ===
7" single (1977, France etc.)

A. "Petit rainbow" ("Summer Love Sensation") (3:33)
B. "Bla bla bla" (2:46)

=== Charts ===
Chart (1977)	Peak position
France (SNEP)	1
Belgium (Ultratop 50 Wallonia)	1

== Bobby Vinton version ==
"Summerlove, Sensation"

Single by Bobby Vinton
- B-side: "My First, My Only Love"
- Released: August 1978
- Recorded: 1978
- Genre: Pop, adult contemporary
- Length: 3:23
- Label: Elektra
- Songwriters: Phil Coulter, Bill Martin
- Producer: Phil Coulter

Bobby Vinton singles chronology
"All My Todays" (1977)	"Summerlove, Sensation" (1978)	"Disco Polka (Pennsylvania Polka)" (1979)

Audio
- "Summerlove, Sensation" on YouTube

Bobby Vinton covered "Summerlove, Sensation" (adding a comma to the title) in 1978 as a non-album single, released that August on Elektra Records. His version reached #44 on the U.S. Billboard Easy Listening chart during the summer of that year, with Coulter returning to produce Vinton's version. Vinton's version was also released as a promotional single in Canada around the same time but failed to chart. Vinton and Coulter also co-wrote the single's B-side, "My First, My Only Love".

=== Charts ===
Chart (1978)	Peak position
US Adult Contemporary (Billboard)	44
