= Freddie Starr =

British comedian and singer (1943–2019)

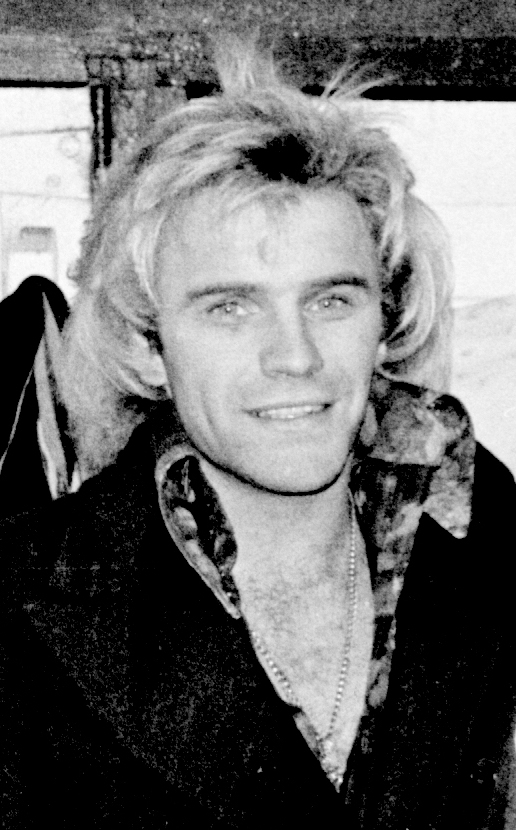
- Starr in 1976
- Born: Frederick Leslie Fowell; 9 January 1943; Liverpool, England
- Died: 9 May 2019 (aged 76); Mijas, Spain
- Occupations: Comedian; impressionist; singer; actor
- Years active: 1958–2015
- Children: 6

Comedy career
- Medium: Stand-up, television
- Genres: Observational comedy, musical comedy, physical comedy, insult comedy

Freddie Starr (born Frederick Leslie Fowell; 9 January 1943 – 9 May 2019) was an English stand-up comedian, impressionist, singer and actor. Starr was the lead singer of Merseybeat rock and roll group the Midniters (Note: In Starr's autobiography, the name of the band is spelled Midniters, with a contemporary publicity photograph using this spelling. On the recordings that Starr made with Joe Meek for Decca, the name of the band is spelled Midnighters.) during the early 1960s, and came to prominence in the early 1970s after appearing on Opportunity Knocks and the Royal Variety Performance. In the 1990s, he starred in several television shows, including Freddie Starr (1993–1994), The Freddie Starr Show (1996–1998) and two episodes of An Audience with... in 1996 and 1997. In 1999, he presented the game show Beat the Crusher.

== Early life ==
Starr was born in Ulster Road, Liverpool, England. At the age of four, he moved with his family to the nearby town of Huyton. One of five children, Starr was the son of a bricklayer, who was often unemployed. According to Starr, his mother Hilda (née Feihnen) was from Germany and was Jewish. A twin brother died at birth. When his father, who was also a bare-knuckled boxer, was drunk he repeatedly beat Starr up when he was a young child. In one incident, his father broke both of his son's legs. At the age of six, Starr stopped speaking, and was taken into care. As a result of these experiences, he was teetotal for life. In his 2001 autobiography Unwrapped, Starr gives speech problems as the reason he spent two years away from home as a child. He attended Sylvester's Primary, and later Huyton Secondary Modern. His father died when Starr was in his early teens.

Starr was encouraged by his mother to perform from the age of 12 working in pubs and clubs. For five years, he was a member of the Hilda Fallon Roadshow which toured community halls and hospitals.

== Entertainment career ==
Under his birth name, Starr appeared as a teenager in the film Violent Playground (1958). In 1961, Starr joined Derry and the Seniors and spent most of his time playing in Germany. In 1962, they became the first Liverpool beat group to record and later release an LP. After they disbanded in late 1962, Starr became the lead singer of the Merseybeat pop group The Midniters (also spelt as Midnighters) which was managed by Brian Epstein. The group recorded three singles, each produced by Joe Meek, all of which failed to enter the charts. During this period Starr's group performed in Hamburg's nightclubs, around the same time as the Beatles.

Still relatively unknown to television audiences, Starr was "discovered" through the talent show, Opportunity Knocks in 1967 where he appeared as part of comedy/beat act Freddie Starr and the Delmonts, winning the popular vote each time over six weeks. He appeared as the second act on the 1970 Royal Variety Performance during which he did comedy impersonations of Cliff Richard, Tom Jones, Adam Faith, Billy Fury, Norman Wisdom and Mick Jagger of the Rolling Stones. He was famous for impersonating Adolf Hitler in Wellington boots. During his career, he also impersonated Elvis Presley and Ray Charles. Starr released a number of albums during his career, one of which yielded a UK Top 10 single, "It's You", in March 1974. Two of his albums charted: After the Laughter in 1989 and The Wanderer in 1990.

From 1972, Starr was one of the main performers in the television series Who Do You Do? and a regular on the TV panel show Jokers Wild. A first attempt at his own series, Ready Freddie Starr (1974), was reduced to a single special programme because Starr had disputes with the production team at London Weekend Television (LWT). He later starred in his own BBC series in 1976. His wit, wrote Mark Lawson, "relied on broad punchlines and silly slapstick". Stuart Jeffries in his Guardian obituary of Starr wrote that his act was "pre-cerebral, unrepentantly sexist, often racist comedy that was rendered overwhelmingly obsolete by the late 1980s".

For 20 years, from 1974, Starr developed an addiction to Valium. The chat show host Michael Parkinson wrote that it "addled his talent and confused his personality", eroding "a virtuosity equalled by only a very few entertainers".

=== "Freddie Starr ate my hamster" ===
"Freddie Starr Ate My Hamster", headline of The Sun, 13 March 1986

Starr was the subject of one of the best-known British tabloid newspaper headlines. On 13 March 1986 The Sun carried as its main headline: "Freddie Starr Ate My Hamster". The man behind the hamster story was the British publicist, Max Clifford, at that time Starr's agent, who concocted the story as a practical joke. According to the text of the story, Starr had been staying at the home of his friend Vince McCaffrey and his 23-year-old girlfriend Lea La Salle in Birchwood, Cheshire, when the alleged incident took place. Starr was claimed to have returned home from a performance at a Manchester nightclub in the early hours of the morning and demanded that La Salle make him a sandwich. When she refused, he went into the kitchen and put her pet hamster Supersonic between two slices of bread and proceeded to eat it.

Starr gave his own account of the story in his 2001 autobiography Unwrapped, stating that the only time that he ever stayed at Vince McCaffrey's house was in 1979, and that the incident was a complete fabrication. Starr writes in the book: "I have never eaten or even nibbled a live hamster, gerbil, guinea pig, mouse, shrew, vole or any other small mammal".

Initially the story had no effect on Starr's career, but it soon proved beneficial. Tickets for a forthcoming tour had been selling slowly but, after the headline in The Sun, the publicity led to the addition of 12 dates to his itinerary and is believed to have boosted Starr's fee by one million pounds. When asked in a television interview with Esther Rantzen some years later whether Starr really had eaten a hamster, his reply was "Of course not". Clifford was unapologetic, stating that the story had given a huge boost to Starr's career.

In May 2006, the BBC nominated "Freddie Starr Ate My Hamster" as one of the most familiar British newspaper headlines over the last century. The headline was the inspiration for the title of the 1988 video game Rock Star Ate My Hamster.

Starr's frustration at being linked perpetually to the hamster story was expressed in a 2007 newspaper interview, when he commented: "I'm fed up of people shouting out 'Did you eat that hamster, Freddie?' Now I say, give me £1 and I'll tell you. Then if they give me £1, I say 'No' and walk away." Starr says that the story came about after he made an offhand joke about eating a hamster in a sandwich.

The Sun's front-page headline after Starr's death was "Freddie Starr Joins His Hamster".

=== Later career ===
Starr appeared in Freddie Starr (1993–94) and The Freddie Starr Show (1996–98) made by Central. At the beginning of his appearance on LWT's An Audience with Freddie Starr in 1996, he threw handfuls of fake maggots at the audience. Nevertheless, Another Audience with Freddie Starr followed in 1997. This time he hit eggs with a golf club into the audience.

Starr was the owner of Miinnehoma, the winning horse in the 1994 Grand National race. He was not present on the day because of television commitments elsewhere, but gave an unusual post-race interview live on television to presenter Des Lynam via a mobile phone, with the television viewers able only to hear Lynam's responses to what Starr was saying.

In March 2009, Starr appeared in Living with the Dead, a reality television show about people being haunted by ghosts. Freddie claimed his 1930s house was being haunted by an evil entity which he called George. During the show it appeared that he was possessed by this entity. It was later revealed that the entity's name was Roger. During the episode, Freddie says that since he was a boy he was always spiritual and firmly believed in ghosts.

Starr was due to tour in 2010, but the tour was cancelled when he suffered a major heart attack in April 2010, resulting in quadruple heart bypass surgery. The tour dates were rescheduled for 2011 after he recovered.

Starr participated in the 2011 series of I'm a Celebrity... Get Me Out Of Here, but withdrew for health reasons. His last tour was in 2015 which included a reviewed date at the Royal Hippodrome Theatre in Eastbourne with his last performance being at the Princes Theatre in Clacton-On-Sea.

== Personal life ==
Starr was a keen supporter of Everton F.C., and was a vegetarian from his teenage years onwards. At the height of his television celebrity, he appeared on ITV's coverage of the buildup to the 1984 FA Cup Final, in which Everton defeated Elton John's Watford 2–0. He appeared on the lawn outside the hotel where the Everton team were staying, on the morning of the game and gave an impromptu comedy performance to the players, who watched from the windows of their rooms.

In April 1994, Robin Coxhead, a gardener employed by Starr, was charged with alleged theft of £41,000 worth of jewellery from the comedian's home. When questioned by the police, Coxhead claimed the jewellery had been given to him as a reward because he had been giving oral sex to Starr over a period of five years. However, Coxhead was discredited in court when he was unable to state whether Starr's penis was circumcised or not. Coxhead was found guilty and sentenced to 15 months in prison in 1995.

Starr had six children. One of his daughters, Tara Coleman-Starr was born in the late 1990s and was a child actress, portraying Claire Thompson in the BBC soap opera Doctors. Following his death, Coleman-Starr stated that he was violent, alleging that he punched her mother in the stomach whilst pregnant with her, demanded that her mother had an abortion, walked out on her as a child and contributed towards her needing therapy at 14.

== Allegations of child sexual abuse ==
In a 2006 biography, musician Ritchie Blackmore alleged that he was sexually assaulted by Starr at age 17 while recording in Joe Meek's studio.

In October 2012, Starr obtained an injunction to prevent a claim from being made about his personal life. The injunction was overturned as it was considered to be an issue involving potential defamation, which the media outlets concerned were not planning to publish. On 8 October 2012, Channel 4 News reported allegations relating to Starr's appearance on Jimmy Savile's BBC television show Clunk Click in 1974, which he denied through his lawyer and in media interviews.

On 1 November 2012, as part of Operation Yewtree, Starr was arrested by police at his Warwickshire home, in connection with the Jimmy Savile sexual abuse scandal. He was arrested on three subsequent occasions, without any connections to Savile, the last being on 12 February 2014. Starr denied the claims made against him. On 6 May 2014, it was reported that the Crown Prosecution Service had decided not to bring charges against Starr in connection with the allegations, on the grounds of "insufficient evidence". The Crown Prosecution Service said there was "a realistic prospect of conviction" in one case, but it was not in the public interest to prosecute Starr.

On 10 July 2015, the High Court dismissed a claim for slander and libel that Starr had brought against the woman who had made the allegations relating to his appearance on Clunk Click in 1974. The woman's claim was found to be true, but the case could not proceed because of the passage of time. He emigrated to Spain, but denied this was due to the legal bill estimated at £1 million, saying he had planned to move to Spain whatever the outcome of the court case.

== Death ==
Starr was found dead at his home in Mijas, on the Costa del Sol, Spain, on 9 May 2019, aged 76. A post-mortem showed that he died from coronary artery disease. The director of Malaga province's Institute of Legal Medicine stated that Starr's death was natural and caused by an ischemic heart disease.

At the time of his death, Starr was living in constrained financial circumstances, and his funeral costs were covered by an undertaker from Sheffield. The funeral was held at Prescot Parish Church on Merseyside on 13 June 2019, with his body being buried in a family-owned grave.

== Selected credits ==
=== Acting roles ===
Title	Year	Role
Violent Playground	1958	Tommy
Who Do You Do?	1972–1973	Various impressions
The Squeeze	1977	Teddy
Mr. H is Late (TV short)	1988	Short Undertaker
Supply & Demand (TV pilot)	1997	Lance Izzard
Ohh, Nooo! Mr. Bill Presents	1998–1999	Various characters

=== DVD releases ===
Title	Release date	Age rating
Freddie Starr's Comedy Express	2003 (Filmed in 1985)	PG
Freddie Starr: Live	2003 (Filmed in 1993)	18
An Audience with Freddie Starr	2005 (Filmed in 1996)	15
Masters of Comedy – Freddie Starr	2007	PG
Live and Devilish	2006 (Filmed in 1995)	18
Live and Dangerous	2006 (Filmed in 1994)	18
Bombed and Blitzed	2006 (Filmed in 1995)	18
The Legend is Back	2006 (Filmed in 1997)	18

=== Musical discography ===
Title	Release date	Studio
Wailin' Howie Casey & The Seniors	1962	Fontana
Freddie Starr & The Midnighters	1963	Decca
Starr is Born	1971	A&M Records
From Me to You	1974	Tiffany
Freddie Starr	1978	PVK Records
Spirit of Elvis	1981	Kamera Records
Freddie Starr	1982	Towerbell Records
A New Twist	1984	Village Recorders
It's Me	1987	Zone Records
After the Laughter	1989	Dover Records
The Wanderer	1990	Dover Records, Chrysalis
The Starr Collection	1993	Castle Communications
The Boys 'n' Me	1997	(Not On Label)
All Shook Up	1998	(Not On Label)
Memories	2000	Streamline Promotions

== See also ==
- Rock Star Ate My Hamster, management strategy computer game (1988)
