= It's You (Freddie Starr song) =

Song by Freddie Starr
- B-side: "We Can't Make it Anymore"
- Released: 1974
- Genre: Ballad
- Label: Tiffany
- Songwriter(s): Larry Butler
- Producer(s): Dave Christie

Freddie Starr singles chronology
""I Guess I'll Call You" (1974)"	"It's You"	""The Most Beautiful Girl" (1974)"

"It's You" is a song and single written by Larry Butler, performed by the comedian Freddie Starr and released in 1974.

English comedian, Freddie Starr, who died in 2019 had two hit singles in the UK during his lifetime. "It's You" was the first and biggest hit making number 9 in the UK Singles Charts in 1974 staying in the charts for 10 weeks.
