= Tam Paton =

British businessman and musical manager

Thomas Dougal "Tam" Paton
- Born: Thomas Dougal Paton; 5 August 1938; Prestonpans, Scotland
- Died: 8 April 2009 (aged 70); Edinburgh, Scotland
- Other name: Tam Paton
- Occupation: Music manager
- Status: Deceased
- Criminal charges: Child sexual abuse, drug offences
- Penalty: 3-year prison sentence (1982), £200,000 fine (2004)

Thomas Dougal "Tam" Paton (/ˈpeɪtən/; 5 August 1938 – 8 April 2009) was a convicted child sex offender and pop group manager, most notably of the Scottish boy band the Bay City Rollers.

== Biography ==
Born in Prestonpans, Scotland, he was the son of a potato merchant. Paton initially drove a truck to aid the Bay City Rollers financially. He guided the band through to their period of success during the mid-1970s, nurturing their image of being the "boys next door". He was responsible for beginning a myth that the band members preferred drinking milk to alcohol, in order to cultivate a clean, innocent image. However, vocalist Les McKeown later said Paton introduced the band members to drugs. "When we got a wee bit tired, he'd give us amphetamines," McKeown recalled in 2005. "He'd keep us awake with speed, black bombers. You end up almost showing off to each other what stupid drugs you've taken."

In 1979, Paton was fired as manager, and subsequently developed a multi-million-pound real estate business based in Edinburgh, Scotland.

In the late 1970s Paton managed the band Rosetta Stone, and had a romantic relationship with the guitarist Paul Lerwill, who later changed his name to Gregory Gray.

In his autobiography I Ran With The Gang: My Life In And Out Of The Bay City Rollers (2018), Alan Longmuir suggests Paton benefited from friendships with politicians, police officers and senior members of the justiciary, and wrote of his fears that more will emerge about Paton that will show “his depravity ran deeper than we currently know”.

Longmuir states:

He had friends in high and low places. The friends in high places included politicians and senior members of the police and judiciary. The friends in low places included scum that would slash your face for a bag of Tam’s finest Colombian cocaine. A dangerous combination.

... I could not help noticing boys drifting around the house. 'Who are all these boys, Tam?' I asked. 'They’re Edinburgh's waifs and strays'. My brow furrowed.

'Alan, the police bring them here. It's all above board. The police find them on the streets and to keep them out of trouble they bring them here.'

== Criminal convictions and child sex abuse allegations ==
Paton was involved in a number of legal controversies. In 1982 he was jailed for three years after pleading guilty to the sexual abuse of 10 boys over a three-year period.

He was arrested on child sexual abuse charges in January 2003, but was later cleared of all allegations. In April 2004, Paton was convicted of supplying cannabis and fined £200,000. In 2003, he was accused of trying to rape the Bay City Rollers guitarist Pat McGlynn, in a hotel room in 1977. The police decided there was insufficient evidence for a prosecution.

In 2016, Bay City Rollers singer Les McKeown accused Paton of raping him. In the documentary Secrets of the Bay City Rollers (2023):

Presenter Nicky Campbell uncovers a near inconceivably sadistic and far-reaching network of cruelty that the young men comprising Scottish pop rock band Bay City Rollers were forced to endure – as their manager Tam Paton controlled every aspect of their lives, sexually and emotionally abused them and facilitated their abuse by others. Those triggered by sexual violence and child abuse should give this programme the widest possible berth as it unflinchingly lays bare not just the abuse of the band, but also the widespread sexual abuse of children in Scotland in the 1970s.

In 1976, Paton took 15-year-old Gert Magnus, a member of the Danish boy band Mabel, under his management after the group had supported the Bay City Rollers. Magnus subsequently lived at Paton's home in Edinburgh. Magnus alleged that Paton groomed him and offered him a place in the Bay City Rollers in exchange for sex. Magnus said he was “completely sure” that, had he accepted Paton’s offer, he would have become a member of the Bay City Rollers.

In the same documentary, Gert Magnus states that while he stayed at Paton's house:

'There were always parties and lots of young boys and lots of producers… Going to the room and coming out. Big party.' He also recalled 'Jimmy Savile' being present. 'I was so young. And I thought that's normal in this business,' he said. The band's original singer Nobby Clarke elsewhere says Paton once told him the band would get better promotion on Radio 1 if a member slept with DJ Chris Denning, who was later convicted of paedophilia.

In October 2022 John Wilson was convicted of sexually assaulting children, with Paton, at Paton's home.

== Death ==
Paton died of a suspected heart attack aged 70 at his Edinburgh home on 8 April 2009. At the time of his death he weighed 25 stone (350 lb; 160 kg). On the night of his death, drugs and cash worth £1.5m were stolen from his house.

== See also ==
- Jimmy Savile
- Edgardo Díaz

== Bibliography ==
- Allen, Ellis (1975). The Bay City Rollers. Panther. ISBN 978-0-58604325-7.
- Coy, Wayne (2021). Bay City Babylon: The Unbelievable but True Story of the Bay City Rollers. Wheatmark. ISBN 979-8-53475452-0.
- Jonsson, Hannes A. (2022). Don't Stop the Music: The Bay City Rollers on Record (2nd ed.). Independently published. ISBN 979-8-84120575-3.
- Longmuir, Alan; Knight, Martin (2021). I Ran With The Gang: My Life In and Out of the Bay City Rollers (2nd ed.). Luath Press. ISBN 1-910-02275-6.
- McKeown, Les; Elliott, Lynne (2019). SHANG-A-LANG: My Life with the Bay City Rollers. Mainstream Publishing Company. ISBN 978-1-70129438-7.
- Paton, Tam; Wale, Michael (1975). The Bay City Rollers: Tam Paton’s Sensational Inside Story of Britain’s No. 1 Pop Group. Everest Publishing. ISBN 978-0-90392560-0.
- Rogan, Johnny (1988). Starmakers & Svengalis: The History of British Pop Management. Macdonald, Queen Anne Press. ISBN 978-0-35615138-0.
- Spence, Simon (2016). When the Screaming Stops: The Dark History of the Bay City Rollers. Omnibus Press. ISBN 978-1-78305937-9.
- Stambler, Irwin (1974). Encyclopedia of Pop, Rock and Soul. St. Martin's Press. ISBN 0-312-25025-8.
- Sullivan, Caroline (2000). Bye Bye Baby: My Tragic Love Affair with the Bay City Rollers. Bloomsbury. ISBN 0-7475-4703-3.
- Wood, Stuart; Stoneman, Peter (2025). MANIA: Tartan, turmoil and my life as a Bay City Roller. Blink Publishing. ISBN 978-1-7851-2198-2.
