= List of records by RAK Records =

This is a list of records published by the Rak Records Label

== Singles ==
Number	Singer	Title	Producer	Published
101	Julie Felix	El Cóndor Pasa	Mickie Most	1970
102	Herman's Hermits	Bet Yer Life I Do	Mickie Most	1970
103	Hot Chocolate	Love Is Life	Mickie Most	1970
104	C.C.S.	Whole Lotta Love	Mickie Most	1970
105	Julie Felix	Heaven Is Here	Mickie Most	1970
106	Peter Noone and Herman's Hermits	Lady Barbara	Mickie Most	1970
107	John Paul Joans	The Man From Nazareth	A Strawberry Production	1970
108	Julie Felix	Snakeskin	Mickie Most	1970
109	C.C.S.	Walking	Mickie Most	1971
110	Hot Chocolate	You Could've Been A Lady	Mickie Most	1971
111	New World	Rose Garden	Mike Hurst	1971
112	James Horne	Love Motion	?	1971
113	Matchbox (RAK)	Don't Shut Me Out	Jack Oliver	1971
114	Peter Noone	Oh You Pretty Things	Mickie Most	1971
115	Love Story	Stay Awhile	Mickie Most	1971
116	Julie Felix	Moonlight	Mickie Most	1971
117	New World	Tom-Tom Turnaround	Mike Hurst	1971
118	Hot Chocolate	I Believe (In Love)	Mickie Most	1971
119	C.C.S.	Tap Turns On The Water	Mickie Most	1971
120	Jeff Smith	Gypsy In My Blood	Eric Grahams	1971
121	Peter Noone	Walnut Whirl	Mickie Most	1971
122	Rescue Co. No. 1	Life's Too Short	Arnold, Martin, Morrow	1971
123	New World	Kara, Kara	Mickie Most	1971
124	?	?	?	1971
125	Fitz And Dennis	I'd Give Anything For Your Love	Ben Findon	1972
126	C.C.S.	Brother	Mickie Most	1972
127	Hot Chocolate	Mary Anne	Mickie Most	1972
128	Christopher Neil	If I Was Close To You	Peter Knight Junior	1972
129	Peter Noone	Shoo Be Doo Ah	Mickie Most	1972
130	New World	Sister Jane	Mickie Most	1972
131	Julie Felix	Fire, Water, Earth And Air	Mickie Most	1972
132	Little Joe (UK)	I'm On Fire	Ben Findon	1972
133	Aztecs	Most People I Know	Aztecs	1972
134	Suzi Quatro	Rolling Stone	Mickie Most	1972
135	Duncan Browne	Journey	Mickie Most	1972
136	Peter Noone	Should I	Mickie Most	1972
137	Angelo And Eighteen	Midnight Flight	Mickie Most	1972
138	Christopher Neil	Here We Go	Peter Knight, Jnr.	1972
139	Hot Chocolate	You'll Always Be A Friend	Errol Brown, Tony Wilson	1972
140	Julie Felix	Clotho's Web	Mickie Most	1972
141	C.C.S.	Sixteen Tons	Mickie Most	1972
142	New World	Living Next Door To Alice	Mickie Most	1972
143	Chapel	Lord I Want To Know	Nicky Chinn Mike Chapman	1972
144	Tony Kenny as Kenny	Heart Of Stone	Bill Martin Phil Coulter	1973
145	?	?	?	1973
146	Mud	Crazy	Nicky Chinn Mike Chapman	1973
147	Peter Noone	Green Green Rocky Road	?	1973	unreleased
148	New World	Rooftop Singing	Mickie Most	1973
149	Hot Chocolate	Brother Louie	Mickie Most	1973
150	Suzi Quatro	Can The Can	Nicky Chinn Mike Chapman	1973	B-side produced by M.Most
151	Angie Miller	Stardust In Your Eyes	L. Lomax	1973
152	Mud	Hypnosis	Nicky Chinn Mike Chapman	1973
153	Tony Kenny as Kenny	Give It To Me Now	Bill Martin Phil Coulter	1973
154	C.C.S.	The Band Played The Boogie	Mickie Most	1973
155	Secrets	Sha La Ley	Johnny Edward	1973
156	The Hood	You Never Can Tell	Nicky Chinn Mike Chapman	1973
157	Hot Chocolate	Rumours	Mickie Most	1973
158	Suzi Quatro	48 Crash	Nicky Chinn Mike Chapman	1973
159	Mud	Dyna-mite	Nicky Chinn Mike Chapman	1973
160	Thieves	Ali Baba	Mickie Most	1973
161	Suzi Quatro	Daytona Demon	Nicky Chinn Mike Chapman	1973
162	Duncan Browne	Send Me The Bill For Your Friendship	Mickie Most	1973
163	Christopher Neil	Love Me	?	1973	unreleased
164	Cozy Powell	Dance with the Devil	Mickie Most	1973
165	New World	Old Shep	Mickie Most	1973
166	Mud	Tiger Feet	Nicky Chinn Mike Chapman	1974
167	Suzi Quatro	Devil Gate Drive	Nicky Chinn Mike Chapman	1974
168	Hot Chocolate	Emma	Mickie Most	1974
169	Errol Flynn=Errol Brown	From The Top Of My Head	A Dagwood Records Production	1974
170	Mud	The Cat Crept In	Nicky Chinn Mike Chapman	1974
171	Arrows	Touch Too Much	Mickie Most	1974
172	C.C.S.	Hurricane Coming	Mickie Most	1974
173	Cozy Powell	The Man In Black	Mickie Most	1974
174	Hot Chocolate	Changing World	Mickie Most	1974
175	Suzi Quatro	Too Big	Nicky Chinn Mike Chapman	1974
176	Shades	Hold On Billy	John Worsley	1974
177	Duster Bennett	Comin' Home	Phil Wainman	1974
178	Mud	Rocket	Nicky Chinn Mike Chapman	1974
179	Dum=Mud	In The Mood	Nicky Chinn Mike Chapman	1974
180	Cozy Powell	Na Na Na	Mickie Most	1974
181	Truth And Beauty Featuring Little Nell As Roxanne	Tuff Little Surfer Boy	Andrew O'Bonzo	1974
182	Arrows	Toughen Up	Mickie Most	1974
183	Barry Reynolds	Outsider's Point Of View	Alan David	1974
184	Priscilla Paris	I Love How You Love Me	Nicky Chinn Mike Chapman	1974
185	Suzi Quatro	The Wild One	Mickie Most	1974
186	Kenny	The Bump	Bill Martin Phil Coulter	1974
187	Mud	Lonely This Christmas	Nicky Chinn Mike Chapman	1974
188	Hot Chocolate	Cheri Babe	Mickie Most	1974
189	Arrows	My Last Night With You	Mickie Most	1975
190	Wild Fire	Come On Down	Tony Wilson	1975
191	Suzi Quatro	Your Mamma Won't Like Me	Nicky Chinn Mike Chapman	1975
192	Smokey	Pass It Around	Nicky Chinn Mike Chapman	1975
193	Tam White	What in the World's Come Over You	Mickie Most	1975
194	Mud	The Secrets That You Keep	Nicky Chinn Mike Chapman	1975
195	The Disco Kid	Roller Coaster	Bill Martin Phil Coulter	1975
196	Kenny	Fancy Pants	Bill Martin Phil Coulter	1975
197	Stewart Jason	Touch Of A Woman	?	1975	unreleased
198	Mike Berry	Don't Be Cruel	Mike Dallon	1975
199	Hot Chocolate	Blue Night	Mickie Most	1975
200	Suzi Quatro	I Bit Off More Than I Could Chew	Nicky Chinn Mike Chapman	1975
201	Mud	Oh, Boy!	Nicky Chinn Mike Chapman	1975
202	Hot Chocolate	Disco Queen	Mickie Most	1975
203	Tam White	Please Mr. Please	Mickie Most	1975
204	Gonzalez	Hole In My Soul	Nicky Chinn Mike Chapman	1975
205	Arrows	Broken Down Heart	Mickie Most	1975
206	Smokey	If You Think You Know How to Love Me	Nicky Chinn Mike Chapman	1975
207	Kenny	Baby I Love You, OK!	Bill Martin Phil Coulter	1975
208	Mud	Moonshine Sally	Nicky Chinn Mike Chapman	1975
209	Angie Miller	Goodbye My Beautiful Dreamer	Ronnie Scott	1975
210	Chris Spedding	Motor Bikin'	Mickie Most	1975
211	Warwick	Let's Get The Party Going	Nicky Chinn Mike Chapman	1975
212	Hot Chocolate	A Child's Prayer	Mickie Most	1975
213	Mud	One Night	Nicky Chinn Mike Chapman	1975
214	Kenny	Julie Anne	Bill Martin Phil Coulter	1975
215	Suzi Quatro	I May Be Too Young	Nicky Chinn Mike Chapman	1975
216	Jan And Joey	Run Joey Run	Phil Dennys	1975
217	Smokey	Don't Play Your Rock 'n' Roll to Me	Nicky Chinn Mike Chapman	1975
218	Arrows	Hard Hearted	Mickie Most	1975
219	Tam White	Cool Water	Mickie Most	1975
220	Richard	Magic Eyes	John Hudson	1975
221	Hot Chocolate	You Sexy Thing	Mickie Most	1975
222	Matayo	Matayo	John Bachini	1975
223	Angie Miller	A Woman's Mind	R.J.Scott	1975
224	Sonny Blake	My Special Angel	Henry Hadaway	1975
225	Kenny	Nice To Have You Home	Bill Martin Phil Coulter	1975
226	Zips	Bye Bye Love	Adrian Baker, Roy Morgan, Seamel	1975
227	Smokie	Something's Been Making Me Blue	Nicky Chinn Mike Chapman	1976
228	Chris Spedding	Jump in My Car	Mickie Most	1976
229	Toby	So Good (I Had To Come Back For More)	Mickie Most	1976
230	Hot Chocolate	Don't Stop It Now	Mickie Most	1976
231	Arrows	Once Upon A Time	Bill Martin Phil Coulter	1976
232	Chris Spedding	New Girl In The Neighbourhood	Mickie Most	1976
233	Smokie	Wild Wild Angels	Nicky Chinn Mike Chapman	1976
234	Heavy Metal Kids	She's No Angel	Mickie Most	1976
235	?	?	?	1976
236	Chris Spedding	Guitar Jamboree	Mickie Most	1976
237	Johnny Roman	Buona Sera	Jan Olofsson	1976
238	Hot Chocolate	Man To Man	Mickie Most	1976
239	Heavy Metal Kids	From Heaven To Hell And Back Again	Mickie Most	1976
240	Hot Chocolate	Heaven Is In The Back Seat Of My Cadillac	Mickie Most	1976
241	Smokie	I'll Meet You at Midnight	Nicky Chinn Mike Chapman	1976
242	Exile	Try it on	Nicky Chinn Mike Chapman	1976
243	Ruby James	You Burn A Hole In My Soul	Biddu	1976
244	Smokie	Living Next Door to Alice	Nicky Chinn Mike Chapman	1976
245	The Vibrators	We Vibrate	Mickie Most	1976
246	Chris Spedding and The Vibrators	Pogo Dancing	Mickie Most	1976
247	Toby	Lester Klaw	Mickie Most	1976
248	Suzi Quatro	Tear Me Apart	Mickie Most	1976
249	Jawbone (Disco)	King Kong (Funkey Monkey)	Mike Leander	1976
250	Exile	Mister Funk Meets The Boogie Man	?	1976	unreleased
251	Smokie	Living Next Door to Alice	Nicky Chinn Mike Chapman	1977
252	Ruby James	I Found My Heaven	Biddu	1977
253	The Vibrators	Bad Time	Mickie Most	1977	unreleased
254	Jaggy Bonnett	Where Have You Gone	John Martin	1977
255	Rags	Promises, Promises	Gillinson, Hayes	1977
256	Suzi Quatro	Roxy Roller	Mickie Most	1977
257	Hot Rocks	Bless My Soul (Part 1)	Alan David	1977
258	Heavy Metal Kids	Chelsea Kids	Mickie Most	1977
259	Hot Chocolate	So You Win Again	Mickie Most	1977
260	Smokie	It's Your Life	Mike Chapman	1977
261	Chris Spedding	Get Outa My Pagoda	Chris Thomas	1977
262	Heavy Metal Kids as H.M.K.	Delirious	Mickie Most	1977
263	Smokie	Needles and Pins	Mike Chapman	1977
264	Geraldine	Wonderful	Bill Martin Phil Coulter	1977
265	Donovan	The Light	Mickie Most	1977
266	Hot Chocolate	Put Your Love In Me	Mickie Most	1977
267	Smokie	For a Few Dollars More	Mike Chapman	1978
268	Chris Spedding	Silver Bullet	Chris Thomas	1978
269	Donovan	Dare To Be Different	Mickie Most	1978
270	Hot Chocolate	Every 1's A Winner	Mickie Most	1978
271	Suzi Quatro	If You Can't Give Me Love	Mike Chapman	1978
272	Cameron	Close Encounters Of The Third Kind (Disco Version)	John Cameron	1978
273	Exile	You Thrill Me	Mike Chapman	1978
274	Chris Spedding	Bored Bored	Chris Spedding	1978
275	Flint	A Real Fine State Of Mind	Mickie Most	1978
276	Smokie	Oh Carol	Mike Chapman	1978
277	Racey	Baby It's You	Mickie Most	1978
278	Suzi Quatro	The Race Is On	Mike Chapman	1978
279	Exile	Kiss You All Over	Mike Chapman	1978
280	Kandidate	Don't Wanna Say Goodnight	Mickie Most	1978
281	Autographs	While I'm Still Young	Richard Hartley, Tommy Boyce	1978
282	Chris Spedding	Gunfight	Mickie Most	1978
283	Smokie	Mexican Girl	Mike Chapman
284	Racey	Lay Your Love on Me	Mickie Most	1978
285	Suzi Quatro and Chris Norman	Stumblin' In	Mike Chapman	1978
286	Hot Chocolate	I'll Put You Together Again	Mickie Most	1979
287	Exile	Never Gonna Stop	Mike Chapman	1978
288	Kryptonite	Superman	John Cameron, Eric Arthur Tomlinson, Alan Snelling	1979
289	Kandidate	I Don't Wanna Lose You	Mickie Most	1979
290	Chris Spedding	Video Life	Chris Spedding	1979
291	Racey	Some Girls	Mickie Most	1979
292	Hot Chocolate	Mindless Boogie	Mickie Most	1979
293	Exile	How Could This Go Wrong	Mike Chapman	1979
294	Smokie	Do To Me	Smokie	1979
295	Kandidate	Girls Girls Girls	Mickie Most	1979
296	Hot Chocolate	Going Through The Motions	Mickie Most	1979
297	Racey	Boy Oh Boy	Mickie Most	1979
298	East Side Band	Rendezvous	East Side Band	1979
299	Suzi Quatro	She's In Love With You	Mike Chapman	1979
300	Smokie	Babe It's Up to You	Smokie	1979
301	Racey	Such A Night	Mickie Most	1979
302	Tredegar Brass Band	Send In the Clowns	Mickie Most	1979
303	Suzi Quatro	Mama's Boy	Mike Chapman	1980
304	Blackie	Making A Bad Boy Good	Alan Tarney, Trevor Spencer	1980
305	East Side Band	1980	?	1980	unreleased
306	Kandidate	Let Me Rock You	Mickie Most	1980
307	Suzi Quatro	I've Never Been In Love	Mike Chapman	1980
308	Valentine Guinness	(Hey, Hey) C.J.T.	Steve Glen	1980
309	Smokie	Take Good Care of My Baby	Smokie	1980
310	Hot Chocolate	No Doubt About It	Mickie Most	1980
311	Harpo	She Loves It Too	Harpo	1980	unreleased
312	Reactor	Energy Crisis	?	1980	unreleased
313	The Toys[Glen-Burns-Most]	Doctor, Doctor	Steve Glen	1980
314	Blackie	For Your Love	J. Calvert, Glenn Hughes	1980
315	Boss [Ska]	Rude Boys Are Back In Town	Mickie Most	1980
316	Kandidate	I'm Young	Mickie Most	1980
317	Racey	Rest Of My Life	Mickie Most	1980
318	Hot Chocolate	Are You Getting Enough Of What Makes You Happy	Mickie Most	1980
319	Lino	I Believe Her	G.Jackman, A.Jackman	1980
320	Boss [Ska]	When The Chips Are Down	Mickie Most	1980
321	Smokie	Run to Me	Smokie	1980
322	?	?	?	1980
323	Chris Spedding	The Crying Game	Chris Thomas	1980
324	Hot Chocolate	Love Me To Sleep	Mickie Most	1980
325	Racey	Runaround Sue	Mickie Most	1980
326	Chris Spedding	I'm Not Like Everybody Else	Mickie Most	1981
327	Kim Wilde	Kids In America	Ricky Wilde	1981
328	Hot Chocolate	Losing You	Mickie Most	1981
329	Racey	Shame	Mickie Most	1981
330	Kim Wilde	Chequered Love	Ricky Wilde	1981
331	Hot Chocolate	You'll Never Be So Wrong	Mickie Most	1981
332	Tommy "J"	Ridin' In My Car	Rockmasters	1981
333	Exile	Heart and Soul	Mike Chapman	1981
334	Kim Wilde	Water on Glass	Ricky Wilde	1981
335	Racey	Little Darlin'	Mickie Most	1981
336	Kim Wilde	Cambodia	Ricky Wilde	1981
337	Hot Chocolate	Where Did We Go Wrong	Mickie Most	1981	unreleased
338	Racey	There's A Party Going On	Mickie Most	1981
339	Adrian Gurvitz	Classic	Adrian Gurvitz, Paul Gurvitz	1982
340	Empire [RAK]	Palace Sign	Patrick Moraz, Greg Jackman	1981
341	Hot Chocolate	Girl Crazy	Mickie Most	1982
342	Kim Wilde	View from a Bridge	Ricky Wilde	1982
343	Adrian Gurvitz	Your Dream	Adrian Gurvitz, Paul Gurvitz	1982
344	Hot Chocolate	It Started with a Kiss	Mickie Most	1982
345	Rocky Sharpe and the Replays	Clap Your Hands	Mike Vernon	1982
346	Hot Club	The Dirt That She Walks In Is Sacred Ground To Me	Mickie Most	1982
347	Adrian Gurvitz	Clown	Adrian Gurvitz, Paul Gurvitz	1982
348	Racey	Not Too Young To Get Married	?	1982
349	The Enid	And Then There Were None	Robert John Godfrey	1982
350	Hot Chocolate	Chances	Mickie Most	1982
351	Nicci Sun	Who Saved Who	Mickie Most	1982
352	Kim Wilde	Child Come Away	Ricky Wilde	1982
353	Art School And The Mighty Motor Gang	Emotion Explosion	Mickie Most	1982
354	Jerome Jasper	I'll Do Anything For You	T. Edmunds, Jerome Jasper	1982
355	Robin Sarstedt and Patti Love	You're Just In Love	Ray Singer	1982
356	Art School And The Mighty Motor Gang	Lovin' You	Mickie Most	1983
357	Hot Chocolate	What Kinda Boy You're Lookin' For (Girl)	Mickie Most	1983
358	Adrian Gurvitz	Corner Of Love	Mickie Most	1983
359	Billy J. Kramer	You Can't Live On Memories	Brian Hodgson	1983
360	Kim Wilde	Love Blonde	Ricky Wilde	1983
361	Hot Club	It Ain't Me Girl	Alex Sadkin	1983
362	?	?	?	1983
363	Hot Chocolate	Tears On The Telephone	Mickie Most	1983
364	Rudy Grant	Everyday People	Rudy Grant	1983
365	Kim Wilde	Dancing in the Dark	Ricky Wilde	1983
366	Hot Chocolate	I'm Sorry	Mickie Most	1983
367	Adrian Gurvitz	Hello Mum	Adrian Gurvitz, Paul Gurvitz	1983
368	Billy J. Kramer	You Can't Live On Memories	Brian Hodgson	1984	unreleased
369	Hot Chocolate	I Gave You My Heart (Didn't I)	Mickie Most	1984
370	Cole	Fool	Calvin Hayes	1984
371	Clark Datchler	I Don't Want You	Mickie Most	1984
372	Suzi Quatro	I Go Wild	Mickie Most	1984
373	?	?	?	1984
374	3D	Break The Fix(ation)	Calvin Hayes	1984
375	McVay	Boys Go Dancing	Mike Leander	1984
376	Johnny Warman	(Here Comes) The Beat Patrol	Mickie Most	1984
377	3D	Nearer	Calvin Hayes	1985
378	Howcher	Colder Than Coldest Sea	Charlesworth, Lyth	1984
379	Clark Datchler	Things Can't Get Any Worse	Clark Datchler, Mike Nocito	1984
380	Rudy Grant	Get Ready, Get Right	Rudy Grant	1984
381	McVay	Chain Of Disaster	Mickie Most	1984
382	3D	Dance To Believe	Calvin Hayes	1984
383	Steve Harley & Cockney Rebel	Irresistible	Mickie Most	1985
384	Suzi Quatro	Tonight I Could Fall In Love	Mickie Most	1985
385	?	?	?	1985
386	Hot Chocolate	Heartache No. 9	Mickie Most	1985
387	Steve Harley	Heartbeat Like Thunder	Mickie Most	1985
388	Johnny Hates Jazz	Me and My Foolish Heart	Calvin Hayes, Mike Nocito	1985
389	Steve Harley	Irresistible	Mickie Most	1985
390	Trojan Horse	Meat Eater	Danny The Red, Meat Eater	2014
391	Beautiful Boy	Bodies	Richard Woodcraft	2014
392	The Cadbury Sisters	Weight Of It	Isabel Seelinger-Morley	2014
393	Kuki And The Bard	Dalai Lama	Jonathan Quarmby	2015
394	Shields [UK]	Swallow Me	Mike Horner	2016
501	Soho [RAK]	Mona Lisa Smile	Mickie Most	1987
502	London Community Gospel Choir	Conversion	Rod Edwards	1987
503	?	?	?	1988
504	Perfect Stranger [UK]	I Don't Wanna Fight	Mickie Most	1988

== Albums ==
Number	Singer	Title	Producer	Published
SRKA 6751	CCS	C.C.S.	Mickie Most	1970
SRAK 501	Alexis Korner	Alexis	Jean Paul Salvatori	1971
SRAK 502	New World	New World	Mickie Most	1971
SRAK 503	CCS	C.C.S. 2	Mickie Most	1972
SRAK 504	CCS	The Best Band in the Land	Mickie Most	1973
SRAK 505	Suzi Quatro	Suzi Quatro	Nicky Chinn Mike Chapman	1973
SRAK 506	New World	Believe in Music	Mickie Most	1973
SRKA 6752	Julie Felix	Clotho's Web	Mickie Most	1972
SRKA 6754	Duncan Browne	Duncan Browne	Mickie Most	1973
SRAK 507	Hot Chocolate	Cicero Park	Mickie Most	1974
SRAK 508	Mud	Mud Rock	Nicky Chinn Mike Chapman	1974
SRAK 509	Suzi Quatro	Quatro	Nicky Chinn Mike Chapman	1974
SRAK 510	Smokey	Pass It Around	Nicky Chinn Mike Chapman	1975
SRAK 513	Mud	Mud Rock Volume 2	Nicky Chinn Mike Chapman	1975
SRAK 514	Suzi Quatro	Your Mamma Won't Like Me	Nicky Chinn Mike Chapman	1975
SRAK 515	Angie Miller	A Woman's Mind	Ronnie J. Scott	1975
SRAK 516	Hot Chocolate	Hot Chocolate	Mickie Most	1975
SRAK 517	Smokie	Changing All the Time	Nicky Chinn Mike Chapman	1975
SRAK 518	Kenny	The Sound Of Super K	Bill Martin Phil Coulter	1975
SRKA 6755	Mud	Mud's Greatest Hits	Nicky Chinn Mike Chapman	1975
SRAK 519	Chris Spedding	Chris Spedding	Mickie Most	1976
SRAK 520	Smokie	Midnight Café	Nicky Chinn Mike Chapman	1976
SRAK 521	Arrows	First Hit	Bill Martin Phil Coulter	1976
SRAK 522	Hot Chocolate	Man to Man	Mickie Most	1976
SRAK 523	Heavy Metal Kids	Kitsch	Mickie Most	1976
SRAK 524	Hot Chocolate	XIV Greatest Hits	Mickie Most	1976
SRAK 525	Suzi Quatro	Aggro-Phobia	Mickie Most	1976
SRAK 526	Smokie	Greatest Hits	Nicky Chinn Mike Chapman	1977
SRAK 527	CCS	Best Of CCS	Mickie Most	1977
SRAK 528	Donovan	Donovan	Mickie Most	1977
SRAK 529	Chris Spedding	Hurt!	Chris	1977
PSLP 239	Various Artists	RAK Sampler Album		1977
SRAK 530	Smokie	Bright Lights & Back Alleys	Mike Chapman	1977
SRAK 531	Hot Chocolate	Every 1's a Winner	Mickie Most	1978
SRAK 532	Suzi Quatro	If You Knew Suzi...	Mike Chapman	1978
SRAK 533	Exile	Mixed Emotions	Mike Chapman	1978
SRKA 6757	Smokie	The Montreux Album	Mike Chapman	1978
SRAK 534	Chris Spedding	Guitar Graffiti	Mickie Most	1978
SRAK 535	Exile	All There Is	Mike Chapman	1979
SRAK 536	Hot Chocolate	Going Through The Motions	Mickie Most	1979
SRAK 537	Racey	Smash and Grab	Mickie Most	1979
SRAK 538	Suzi Quatro	Suzi ... and Other Four Letter Words	Mike Chapman	1979
SRAK 539	Smokie	The Other Side of the Road	Smokie	1979
EMTV 22	Hot Chocolate	20 Hottest Hits	Mickie Most	1979
SRAK 540	Smokie	The Very Best Of Smokie	Mickie Most	1980
SRAK 541	Smokie	Smokie's Greatest Hits Volume 2	Mickie Most	1980
SRAK 542	Chris Spedding	I'm Not Like Everybody Else	Mickie Most	1980
SRAK 543	Hot Chocolate	Class	Mickie Most	1980
SRAK 544	Kim Wilde	Kim Wilde	Ricky Wilde	1981
SRAK 545	Smokie	Solid Ground	Smokie	1981
SRAK 546	Smokie	Strangers in Paradise	Mickie Most	1982
SRAK 547	Adrian Gurvitz	Classic	Adrian Gurvitz, Paul Gurvitz	1982
SRAK 548	Kim Wilde	Select	Ricky Wilde	1982
SRAK 549	Hot Chocolate	Mystery	Mickie Most	1982
SRAK 551	Kim Wilde	Catch as Catch Can	Ricky Wilde	1983
EMTV 24	Suzi Quatro	Greatest Hits		1988
SRAK 1653831	Hot Chocolate	Love Shot	Mickie Most	1983
EJ 2601081	Kim Wilde	The Very Best of Kim Wilde	Ricky Wilde	1984

== Sources ==
- RAK - Label Discography, 45cat
