= Don't Say It's Love =

Single by Johnny Hates Jazz

from the album Turn Back the Clock
- B-side: "Living in the Past"
- Released: 27 June 1988
- Genre: Pop
- Length: 3:41
- Label: Virgin
- Songwriter: Clark Datchler
- Producers: Calvin Hayes; Mike Nocito

Johnny Hates Jazz singles chronology
"Heart of Gold" (1988)	"Don't Say It's Love" (1988)	"Turn the Tide" (1989)

"Don't Say It's Love" is a song by British band Johnny Hates Jazz, released in 1988 as the fifth and final single from their debut studio album Turn Back the Clock. It was written by Clark Datchler and produced by Calvin Hayes and Mike Nocito. "Don't Say It's Love" reached No. 48 on the UK Singles Chart and remained in the top 100 for three weeks although it did reach No. 40 on the rival Network Chart. The song did not achieve commercial success in Europe, but reached No. 22 on the European Airplay Top 50 chart.

== Release ==
For its release as a single, a new mix of "Don't Say It's Love" was created by Bob Kraushaar. Lead vocalist and writer Clark Datchler recalled to Will Harris in 2021, "We were never happy with the mix we had on the album. Bob Kraushaar did a fantastic mix of it." Band member Calvin Hayes had originally wanted the song to be released as the follow-up to the band's US debut single "Shattered Dreams" rather than "I Don't Want to Be a Hero".

== Music video ==
The song's music video was directed by Dominic Sena.

== Critical reception ==
On its release, Music & Media described "Don't Say It's Love" as a "melodic pop thrill with a serious groove" and one that is "definitely bound for the top of the charts". Johnny Dee of Record Mirror wrote, "Three nice blokes, in nice suits that make nice records. This is a nice record and I mean that in the nicest possible way!" In a review of Turn Back the Clock, Ernie Long of The Morning Call considered the song, along with the title track, to "help make this accomplished debut effort varied and at times captivating". Billy Warden of The Daily Press described it as "glossy funk in the not-so-grand style of ABC". In a retrospective review, Paul Sinclair of Super Deluxe Edition considered the song to be "slick pop".

== Track listings ==
7" single

1. "Don't Say It's Love" (7" remix) - 3:43
2. "Living in the Past" - 3:37

12" single

1. "Don't Say It's Love" (12" extended mix) - 6:10
2. "Living in the Past" - 3:37
3. "Don't Say It's Love" (7" remix) - 3:43

CD single

1. "Don't Say It's Love" (7" remix) - 3:43
2. "Living in the Past" - 3:34
3. "Don't Say It's Love" (12" extended mix) - 6:09
4. "I Don't Want to Be a Hero" (12" mix) - 6:33

== Personnel ==
Johnny Hates Jazz

- Clark Datchler
- Mike Nocito
- Calvin Hayes

Production

- Calvin Hayes, Mike Nocito - producers
- Bob Kraushaar - mixing on "Don't Say It's Love"

Other

- Simon Fowler - photography
- Stylorouge - design

== Charts ==
Chart (1988)	Peak position
UK Singles Chart	48
UK Network Chart	40
