= Me and My Foolish Heart =

1986 song by Johnny Hates Jazz

Single by Johnny Hates Jazz

from the album Turn Back the Clock
- B-side: "Living in the Past"
- Released: 1986
- Genre: Sophisti-pop
- Length: 3:35
- Label: Rak
- Songwriters: Phil Thornalley; Calvin Hayes; Iain MacDonald; Mike Nocito
- Producers: Calvin Hayes; Mike Nocito

Johnny Hates Jazz singles chronology
"Me and My Foolish Heart" (1986)	"Shattered Dreams" (1987)

"Me and My Foolish Heart" is the debut single by English band Johnny Hates Jazz, released by Rak in 1986. It was written by Phil Thornalley (under the pseudonym L. Da Vinci), Calvin Hayes, Iain MacDonald and Mike Nocito, and was produced by Hayes and Nocito. The song was included on the band's 1988 debut album Turn Back the Clock as "Foolish Heart".

== Writing and recording ==
Johnny Hates Jazz was formed in 1986 after Rak A&R man Calvin Hayes and engineer Mike Nocito began working on their own track which became "Me and My Foolish Heart". The song originated with a track written and recorded by the producer and songwriter Iain MacDonald. Hayes, as Rak's A&R man, acquired a demo tape of the track, took a liking to it and then brought it to Nocito's attention. Nocito loved the intro but did not like the rest of the track. Believing it had hit potential with further work, Hayes contacted MacDonald, and he gave Hayes and Nocito permission to redevelop his intro into their own song.

Hayes and Nocito developed and recorded the backing track at RAK Studios. Hayes' piano playing was inspired by the "theatrical piano style" of Mike Garson. Hayes recalled to the Los Angeles Times in 1988, "I wasn't really a high-ranking type. I just worked there a year [as an A&R man]. Mike was working in the studio as an engineer. We got together and made this instrumental track." As the backing track approached completion, Thornalley came to write the lyrics for the song after finishing his own production session in the adjacent studio. He popped in to see Hayes and Nocito while they were in the studio together and began recording adlibbed lyrics over their backing track in two takes. The title was inspired by Steve Perry's 1984 song "Foolish Heart". Rak's owner and Hayes' father Mickie Most happened to be producing his niece's cover version of the song at RAK Studios at that time and, while in the studio with Hayes and Nocito, Thornalley noticed the title on the box the recording tape was being stored in. Hayes recalled to Will Harris in 2021, "I remember as Phil listened to the backing track, he was sort of pacing up and down, and I could tell his mind was ticking over, and he immediately said to Mike, 'Set up a mike, I've got some ideas.' It was two takes and two takes only. The fact that he was totally adlibbing the lyrics to the melody was incredible. That we should have this bit of music which he could just hear and suddenly come up with that? It was a very magical moment. I was incredibly impressed." Thornalley added, "I just wrote this song on the spot, over their changes. I was singing lyrics, just sort of free-forming it."

Thornalley provided the song's original lead vocals but owing to upcoming production commitments to Robbie Nevil, he informed the pair that he was too busy to pursue further activities with them. The pair decided to approach Clark Datchler, who they had both previously worked with on separate occasions, and asked him to sing on the track. Datchler was a former member of the band Hot Club alongside Hayes, and he later worked with Nocito on some of his own recordings after signing to Rak as a solo artist. Datchler recalled, "It was a weird one for me, because I usually only ever sing on and record my own songs. But 'Me and My Foolish Heart' had something about it that had a relationship to some things that I was working on, and I had been working with Mike, so I sang on the track, and Johnny Hates Jazz was born."

== Release ==
"Me and My Foolish Heart" was released as a single by Rak Records. Hayes told the Los Angeles Times, "When we finished [the song] we went to the RAK people and, before they heard it, I said, 'I've found this group called Johnny Hates Jazz that made this single.' We weren't really even a group yet. They said they liked it. When I told them it was us who made the single they were surprised but they also wanted to put the record out."

In early May, over a month after the single's release, the UK's chart compiler Gallup exposed Mickie Most's attempt to push the release into the charts. Gallup became suspicious after sales data showed that someone was purchasing a half-dozen copies of the single in one transaction from various music stores. A spokesperson for Gallup told the Daily Mirror, "We were very quickly able to track down who this man was. This was an attempt to push a record into the charts but there is no question that Mickie or anyone from the band knew what was going on. It was a simple case of one man's over-enthusiasm getting the better of him. I'm sure Mickie is most embarrassed about the whole business."

The single failed to reach the top 100 of the UK Singles Chart, but it generated enough airplay on BBC Radio 1 and attention in the music press to encourage Datchler to start writing material for the band, and for them to seek a record deal with a major label. After a showcase gig at Ronnie Scott's Jazz Club in Soho, the band signed to Virgin Records at the end of 1986 and scored an international hit with their next single "Shattered Dreams" in 1987.

== Critical reception ==
Upon its release, Jerry Smith of Music Week described "Me and My Foolish Heart" as a "polished pop tune" which "drives along, helped by a dynamic production and a strong vocal that is well underpinned by dramatic piano". He added that it "could well be an unexpected hit if given the necessary exposure". Music & Media picked the song as one of their "records of the week" in their issue of 26 April 1986 and commented, "It is a highly polished and soaring melody in the Fiction Factory/OMD-trail that is sure to pick up good airplay." Richard Cook of Sounds called it an "excellent record" and remarked that the band "follow through the modesty of the song's title [with] music where everything is billowing melody, cascades of keyboard and guitar string and murmurs of remorse from a singer". He added, "A tawdry romance touched with magic for a single instant."

Dave Morgan of the Reading Evening Post described the song as "chugging synth stuff that never rises much above the standard required to appear on Wogan". John Lee of the Huddersfield Daily Examiner considered it to be "a bit wishy-washy, relying for its impact on a few echoey notes on the piano". He added, "Interesting enough I suppose, but not really the stuff to turn the hit parade on its predictable head."

== Track listing ==
7–inch single (UK and Benelux)

1. "Me and My Foolish Heart" – 3:35
2. "Living in the Past" – 3:36

12–inch single (UK and Benelux)

1. "Me and My Foolish Heart" (12" mix) – 5:49
2. "Living in the Past" – 3:36
3. "Me and My Foolish Heart" (7" mix) – 3:35

== Personnel ==
Credits are adapted from the Turn Back the Clock vinyl LP liner notes and the UK 12-single vinyl single.

Johnny Hates Jazz

- Clark Datchler
- Mike Nocito
- Calvin Hayes

Production

- Calvin Hayes – producer
- Mike Nocito – producer

Other

- Shoot That Tiger! – sleeve design

== Charts ==
Chart (1986)	Peak position
UK Singles Chart	112
