= Turn the Tide (Johnny Hates Jazz song) =

Single by Johnny Hates Jazz
- B-side: "Breaking Point"
- Released: 18 September 1989
- Genre: Pop
- Length: 3:44
- Label: Virgin
- Songwriters: Phil Thornalley; Scott Cutler; Chris Murrell
- Producers: Calvin Hayes; Mike Nocito

Johnny Hates Jazz singles chronology
"Don't Say It's Love" (1988)	"Turn the Tide" (1989)	"Let Me Change Your Mind Tonight" (1991)

"Turn the Tide" is a song by British pop band Johnny Hates Jazz, released by Virgin as a non-album single in 1989. The song was written by Phil Thornalley, Scott Cutler and Chris Murrell, and produced by Calvin Hayes and Mike Nocito. It peaked at number 84 in the UK Singles Chart and remained in the top 100 for two weeks.

"Turn the Tide" was Johnny Hates Jazz's first release to feature Phil Thornalley as lead vocalist, following the departure of Clark Datchler at the end of 1988 to pursue a solo career. The song was not included on the band's 1991 studio album Tall Stories.

== Release ==
The single's B-side, "Breaking Point", is an instrumental track written by Hayes and Nocito. The 12-inch and CD formats of the single including the "Rouge Vogue Mix" of "Turn the Tide".

== Critical reception ==
Upon its release, David Giles of Music Week described "Turn the Tide" as "a song in the mould of the first LP, with soft harmonies and a bright, cheerful arrangements". He added, "On occasion the production threatens to choke the song, but it's distinctive enough to re-open their hit account". Andrew Hirst of the Huddersfield Daily Examiner praised it as "another carefully-crafted pop song" and added that "the harsh guitar solo is a fine contrast to the silkily smooth build-up". Tim Southwell of Record Mirror considered the song to have an "aimless procession of cutesy synths and vocals". He stated, "The main problem with Johnny Hates Jazz is the undeniable fact that, no matter how hard they try, their singles tend to be somewhat on the bland side."

== Formats ==
7-inch single

1. "Turn the Tide" - 3:44
2. "Breaking Point" - 3:19

12-inch single

1. "Turn the Tide" (Rouge Vogue Mix) - 5:00
2. "Turn the Tide" - 3:44
3. "Breaking Point" - 3:19

CD single

1. "Turn the Tide" (Seven Inch Version) - 3:44
2. "Turn the Tide" (Rouge Vogue Mix) - 5:00
3. "Breaking Point" - 3:19

== Personnel ==
Johnny Hates Jazz

- Phil Thornalley
- Mike Nocito
- Calvin Hayes

Production

- Calvin Hayes – producer
- Mike Nocito – producer

Other

- Sheila Rock – photography
- Assorted Images – design

== Charts ==
Chart (1989)	Peak position
Italy Airplay (Music & Media)	6
UK Singles (Official Charts)	84
