= The Last Emotion =

1992 song by Medicine Wheel

Single by Medicine Wheel

from the album Fishing for Souls
- B-side: "Autumn Years"
- Released: 13 January 1992
- Length: 4:01
- Label: Virgin
- Songwriter: Clark Datchler
- Producers: Rupert Hine; Humberto Gatica

"The Last Emotion" is a song by the band Medicine Wheel, released by Virgin on 13 January 1992 as the band's debut single from their intended studio album, Fishing for Souls. The song was written by Clark Datchler and was produced by Rupert Hine, with initial production by Humberto Gatica. It reached number 131 in the UK Singles Chart.

== Background ==
Clark Datchler departed Johnny Hates Jazz in 1988 to embark on a solo career with Virgin Records. After his 1990 single "Crown of Thorns" from the album Raindance failed to find commercial success, Datchler began working on his next musical project with a collective of musicians under the name Medicine Wheel. Those involved included guitarists Jamie West-Oram and Phil Palmer, saxophonist Candy Dulfer and drummer John Robinson. An album, Fishing for Souls, was recorded for Virgin and was scheduled for release in 1992. One of the reasons Datchler chose to avoid classing the project as a solo effort is that "too much attention is put on one personality rather than the music" and he also felt that "everybody who contributed has been excellent".

Speaking of "The Last Emotion", Datchler told the Paisley Daily Express in 1992, "I had the idea of someone dying with the last emotion that they experienced. The original lyric was somewhat different and a lot heavier." The initial recording sessions for the song had Humberto Gatica as the producer. Datchler then chose to rerecord the track with producer Rupert Hine in order to improve its hit potential: "I could tell that I was going down the right path but I was blinded by my own limitations in a studio sense. I just couldn't see it fitting in with what was in the charts at that time."

== Release ==
"The Last Emotion" was released in the UK by Virgin Records on 13 January 1992. It failed to reach the top 100 of the UK Singles Chart and reached its peak of number 131 in its first week on 25 January 1992. Both Clark Datchler and Rupert Hine originally wanted the track "State of Play" to have been released as Medicine Wheel's debut single, but Virgin favoured "The Last Emotion" instead. The single noted the forthcoming release of Fishing for Souls on its sleeve, but the album was ultimately shelved by Virgin. Plans for Medicine Wheel to embark on a tour also failed to come to fruition.

== Critical reception ==
Upon its release, Andrew Hirst of the Huddersfield Daily Examiner picked "The Last Emotion" as "single of the week" and wrote, "A true songsmith's song, blessed with a caress of quality. There's nothing at all contrived here. A real appetite-whetter for the band's looming debut album." Peter Kinghorn of the Evening Chronicle described it as a "wistful pop-rock ballad that lingers after the final bars fade – auguring well for the album Fishing for Souls". Steve Cowell of the Yorkshire Evening Press called it an "AOR track with a nise sense of style to it". Penny Kiley of the Liverpool Echo felt that, "despite the title", "this 80s-sounding track does not convey much emotion at all".

== Track listing ==
7–inch single (UK)

1. "The Last Emotion" – 4:01
2. "Autumn Years" – 3:41

CD single (UK)

1. "The Last Emotion" – 4:01
2. "Autumn Years" – 3:41
3. "Close to the Edge" – 3:46

== Personnel ==
Production

- Rupert Hine – production ("The Last Emotion")
- Humberto Gatica – initial production ("The Last Emotion"), production ("Autumn Years", "Close to the Edge")
- Clark Datchler – production ("Autumn Years", "Close to the Edge")
- Stephen W. Tayler – mixing ("The Last Emotion", "Autumn Years")

Other

- Richard Haughton – photography
- Austin Texas – sleeve design

== Charts ==
Chart (1992)	Peak position
UK Singles Chart (OCC)	131
