= Turn Back the Clock =

Turn Back the Clock may refer to:

- Turn Back the Clock (album), an album by Johnny Hates Jazz
  - "Turn Back the Clock" (song), the title song from the album
- "Turn Back the Clock", a song from the album MK III by rock band Steam Powered Giraffe
- Turn Back the Clock (film), a 1933 comedy drama directed by Edgar Selwyn
- Turn Back the Clock (baseball), a Major League Baseball promotion
- Turn Back the Clock (1989 film), a remake of the 1947 noir Repeat Performance

== See also ==
- "Turning Back the Clock", a 2004 episode of Doctors
