= Swamp (album) =

Studio album by Phil Thornalley
- Released: November 1988
- Genre: Pop, rock
- Length: 38:12 (vinyl & cassette); 41:42 (CD)
- Label: MCA
- Producer: Phil Thornalley (tracks 1–11); André Cymone (tracks 1, 6 & 7); Tom Bailey (tracks 2, 5, 8, 11); Jim Williams (track 9)

Singles from Swamp
- 1. "Love Me Like a Rock" Released: September 1988; 2. "Listen" Released: January 1989

Swamp is the debut solo studio album from English songwriter-producer Phil Thornalley, released in 1988 by MCA.

The album's title was named after Thornalley's own private studio Swamp Studios, located in Northwest London. Swamp was produced by Thornalley, with André Cymone and Tom Bailey of Thompson Twins producing three tracks each with him. Jim Williams co-produced the track "Conversations".

== Background ==
The album Swamp was recorded after Thornalley signed with MCA. For his official website biography, he commented: "At the studio I would stay 'after hours' to record my own songs and was signed to MCA in the USA and made my flop solo album Swamp. By this time, my childhood friend Mike Nocito had started the group Johnny Hates Jazz and invited me to join for their second album called Tall Stories. I realized that my passion was for writing songs; not performing them."

Swamp was released in the United States only and was not a commercial success. Two singles were released from the album: "Love Me Like a Rock" in September 1988 and "Listen" in January 1989.

== Song information ==
"Love Me Like a Rock" was later recorded by Daniel John Ohm, who released his version as a single in Germany, taken from his album Time for Love. "Listen" was originally recorded by Johnny Hates Jazz for their own 1988 debut album Turn Back the Clock. Thornalley co-produced the track, and also engineered and mixed the album. "Concentration" was included as part of the soundtrack to the 1989 film She's Out of Control, starring Tony Danza and Catherine Hicks. The soundtrack album, released by MCA, included the track. "Milk and Diamonds" was a bonus track available only on the CD release of Swamp.

== Critical reception ==
Upon release, Billboard listed the album as a recommended pop album. They commented: "Heavy dance rock laced with electronic touches and burning guitar leads frames this debut effort. The anthemic "When I Get to Heaven" is noteworthy; the monster groove of "Concentration" hints at dance-floor action." Bill Coleman later commented in a November 1988 issue of Billboard: ""Listen" deserves to be a smash pop hit, while "Push and Pull," "Conversations," and the single "Love Me Like a Rock" could garner support with properly tailored mixes".

== Track listing ==
No.	Title	Writer(s)	Length
1.	"Love Me Like a Rock"	Phil Thornalley	3:06
2.	"This Time"	Jim Williams, Thornalley	4:12
3.	"Concentration"	Thornalley	3:38
4.	"Listen"	Thornalley	3:58
5.	"When I Get to Heaven"	Williams, Thornalley, Tom Bailey	4:59
6.	"Push and Pull"	Williams, Thornalley	3:43
7.	"Under My Skin"	André Cymone, Colin Campsie, Thornalley	3:39
8.	"Two Hearts"	Williams, Thornalley	3:32
9.	"Conversations"	Williams, Thornalley	3:26
10.	"Everynight I Die for You"	Thornalley	3:54

CD bonus track
No.	Title	Writer(s)	Length
11.	"Milk and Diamonds"	Thornalley	3:30

== Personnel ==
- Phil Thornalley – vocals, lead guitar (1, 7), guitars (2–5, 8, 10, 11), keyboards (3, 4, 10), "throat" bass (3), drums (3, 4, 9, 10), bass (4, 10), lead axe (6)
- André Cymone – keyboards, guitars, bass and drums (1, 6, 7)
- Todd Herreman – Fairlight CMI (1, 6, 7)
- Tom Bailey – keyboards and Fairlight CMI (2, 5, 8), bass (2, 5, 8, 11), Wonderkord (2), cymbals (3), acoustic piano (11), vibraphone (11)
- Reverend La Bot – organ (2)
- Jim Williams – backing vocals (1, 6), "Byrd" guitar (5), "Rok" guitar (6, 7), outro lead guitar (7), guitar solo (8); keyboards, guitars and bass (9)
- David Palmer – drums (2, 8, 11)
- Brian Kilgore – percussion (1, 6, 7), timbales solo (7)
- Elvis Patel – percussion (5)
- Roy Spong – hi-hat, toms and gong (10)
- Mel Collins – tenor saxophone (2)
- Keith Fernley – blues harp (10)
- Tomasso Bom Balini – brass (11)
- Carol Kenyon – backing vocals (1, 7)
- Elaine Griffiths – backing vocals (2, 8)
- Louise Rutkowski – backing vocals (3)

Production

- Phil Thornalley – producer, recording, mixing, remixing (1, 6, 7)
- André Cymone – producer (1, 6, 7)
- Tom Bailey – mixing, remixing (1, 6, 7), producer (2, 5, 8, 11)
- Jim Williams – producer (9)
- Keith Fernley – recording, mixing
- Nick Lacey – assistant engineer
- Roy Spong – assistant engineer
- Ted Jensen – mastering
