= Raindance (Clark Datchler album) =

Studio album by Clark Datchler
- Released: November 1990
- Studios: Olympic Studios, Sarm West Studios and CTS Studios (London); The Manor Studio (Oxford, UK); Wisseloord Studios (Hilversum, Netherlands); Studio 150 (Amsterdam, Netherlands); Logic Studios (Milan, Italy); The Village Studios, Bunny Hop Studios, Lion Share Recording Studio and Record One (Los Angeles, California); Sunset Sound (Hollywood, California); Chartmaker Studios (Malibu, California); Ground Control (Santa Monica, California)
- Label: Virgin
- Producers: Clark Datchler; Humberto Gatica

Clark Datchler chronology
Raindance (1990)	Fishing for Souls (1992)

Professional ratings
Review scores
Source	Rating
Select	2/5 medals

Raindance is the debut solo album from English singer and musician Clark Datchler. It was released in 1990 by Virgin Records. Datchler had left Johnny Hates Jazz in 1988 to continue his solo career. He moved to Amsterdam and began work on his debut album.

Raindance features some renowned musicians, including bass player Nathan East, drummer John "JR" Robinson, percussionist Paulinho da Costa and guitarist Dave Gregory of XTC. The album saw the recording of Datchler's first environmental song, "Raindance". The first single from Raindance was "Crown of Thorns". It reached No. 100 in the UK and remains Datchler's only appearance on the chart as a solo artist. A music video was filmed to promote the single, which shows Clark singing along with other shots of art and relevant scenes relating to the lyrics featured in the song. Raindance was released shortly after but was a commercial failure. The Japanese version of the album features the bonus track "Widow", which was the B-side to "Crown of Thorns".

A selection of tracks were re-used for Datchler's following album Fishing for Souls, which did not see a release until 2010 where it appeared on iTunes. Some of the songs from the album were previously released on the single release of "The Last Emotion", which was released under the name Medicine Wheel in 1992, with Close to the Edge and Autumn Years as the B-sides. The album was re-released in 2022 as part of Datchler's Journey Songs One compilation, which included Fishing for Souls versions and other solo recordings from the early 1990s.

== Track listing ==
All tracks are written by Clark Datchler.

No.	Title	Length
1.	"The State of Play"	3:33
2.	"Drowning My Sorrows"	3:41
3.	"Crown of Thorns"	4:48
4.	"Close to the Edge"	3:40
5.	"It's Better This Way"	4:43
6.	"The Last Emotion"	3:49
7.	"Raindance"	3:43
8.	"Heart of Hearts"	3:09
9.	"True Confessions"	3:42
10.	"Autumn Years"	4:00

1990 Japanese CD issue bonus track
No.	Title	Length
11.	"Widow"	4:53

== Singles ==
"Crown of Thorns"

Chart (1990)	Peak position
Dutch Singles Chart	47
UK Singles Chart	100

"Raindance" Japan only

== Personnel ==
- Clark Datchler – vocals, keyboards, Synclavier strings (10), string arrangements (10)
- Simon Franglen – programming
- Andy Richards – keyboards (1, 4), programming (7)
- Albert Boekholt – programming (1, 2, 3, 7, 10)
- Chuckii Booker – keyboards (4)
- Steve Piggot – keyboards (8)
- Richard Cottle – keyboards (9), programming (9)
- James Newton Howard – Synclavier strings (10), string arrangements (10)
- Paul Jackson Jr. – guitars (1, 4, 7, 9)
- Dave Gregory – guitars (2), acoustic guitar (8)
- Dann Huff – guitars (3, 6)
- James Harrah – guitars (5)
- J.J. Belle – guitars (7)
- Michael Landau – guitars (7, 9), acoustic guitar (10)
- Phil Palmer – electric guitar (8)
- Jay-Tee Teterissa – slap bass (1)
- Nathan East – bass (3), slap bass (7)
- Neil Stubenhaus – bass (8)
- Brian Rawling – drums (1, 6), percussion (10)
- John Robinson – drums (2–7)
- Geoff Dugmore – drums (8)
- Paulinho da Costa – percussion (1, 5–10)
- Rafael Padilla – percussion (1)
- Candy Dulfer – saxophone solo (1, 7)
- Larry Williams – clarinet (2)
- Jerry Hey – horn arrangements (1, 2, 7, 9)
- Jeremy Lubbock – string arrangements (8)
- Renée Geyer – backing vocals (1, 4, 6, 9)
- Simone Walraven – backing vocals (1, 5, 8)
- Ashley Datchler – backing vocals (4)

== Production ==
- Clark Datchler – producer
- Humberto Gatica – producer, engineer
- Nick Davis – engineer, mixing
- Bob Kraushaar – engineer
- Chris Blair – mastering
- Simone Walraven – production assistant
- Stylorouge – artwork
- Richard Haughton – photography

Studios

- Recorded at Olympic Studios, Sarm West Studios and CTS Studios (London, UK); The Manor Studio (Oxford, UK); Wisseloord Studios (Hilversum, Netherlands); Studio 150 (Amsterdam, Netherlands); Logic Studios (Milan, Italy); The Village Studios, Bunny Hop Studios, Lion Share Recording Studio and Record One (Los Angeles, California, USA); Sunset Sound (Hollywood, California, USA); Chartmaker Studios (Malibu, California, USA); Ground Control (Santa Monica, California, USA).
- Mastered at Abbey Road Studios (London, UK).
