= Shattered Dreams =

1987 single by Johnny Hates Jazz

Single by Johnny Hates Jazz

from the album Turn Back the Clock
- B-side: "My Secret Garden"
- Released: 9 March 1987
- Studio: RAK (London, UK)
- Genre: Synth-pop; sophisti-pop
- Length: 3:26
- Label: Virgin
- Songwriter: Clark Datchler
- Producers: Calvin Hayes; Mike Nocito

Johnny Hates Jazz singles chronology
"Me and My Foolish Heart" (1986)	"Shattered Dreams" (1987)	"I Don't Want to Be a Hero" (1987)

Music video
- "Shattered Dreams" on YouTube

"Shattered Dreams" is a song by English musical group Johnny Hates Jazz from their debut studio album, Turn Back the Clock (1988). Written by the band's lead singer, Clark Datchler, and produced by bandmates Calvin Hayes and Mike Nocito, the song was released in March 1987 as the album's lead single. "Shattered Dreams" entered the UK Singles Chart at number 92 and gained popularity through extensive radio play and video rotation on MTV, eventually peaking at number five in May 1987 and spending three weeks at that position.

Internationally, "Shattered Dreams" reached the top 10 in Canada, Ireland, Norway, Switzerland, and West Germany. In the United States, it was released with an alternative music video shot entirely in black and white and directed by David Fincher, which Datchler preferred. The single topped Billboard's Adult Contemporary chart for one week and peaked at number two on the Billboard Hot 100.

== Background ==
Singer Clark Datchler wrote "Shattered Dreams" in a small studio he had set up in the front room of his parents' house. He had an upright piano, a 4-track portastudio, a drum machine, and a keyboard in the studio. He wrote the song quickly, but the middle section with the bongo solo took a while to conceive. Datchler knew he had written something special by his dad's reaction. Usually, his dad would offer musical advice if he asked for it, but would otherwise leave Clark alone. But this time, his dad walked in and told him he had written a big hit, and believed in the song's potential when few other people in the music industry did.

On the lyrics, Datchler said:

Obviously when I wrote "Shattered Dreams" I had it in mind that it would revolve around divorce, not just a relationship break-up but something a little bit heavier. But actually, the way I think people relate to it is that there are all kinds of shattered dreams that we experience on an individual level or in partnerships or as a people, as a nation, as humanity. We are facing some very serious shattered dreams right now whether that be environmental, or economic, or philosophical even. There are ways that "Shattered Dreams" reaches out and touches people when they are going through difficult times. And in some ways, it's not necessarily a very hopeful song. But I think the energy of the song is still quite bright which makes it an interesting combination. It's kind of opposites of each other, but that is something I tend to do lyrically and musically, having serious subjects with more up-tempo music.

Mickie Most, Calvin Hayes' father and head of Rak Records, where the band members worked, remarked that he would stand naked in Selfridges' department store display windows on Oxford Street if "Shattered Dreams" became a hit. However, Most did not fulfill his promise.

== Notable cover versions ==
Clark Datchler and the group parted shortly after the release of Shattered Dreams, and Datchler released an acoustic version as a track on his 1990 Virgin solo single "Crown of Thorns". He later re-recorded a slower version on his 2007 album Tomorrow. The song has notably been covered by Russian singer Sergey Lazarev on his TV Show album, which was his first solo outing outside the post-Soviet zone and his first international single to be formally released in the United Kingdom, and reached number 19 on the Russian TopHit Top Radio Hits chart. On 29 August 2025, American rock band Starset released a cover of the song as the eighth single from their fifth studio album, Silos.

== Critical reception ==
Jerry Smith of the Music Week magazine praised "Shattered Dreams" that he described as "an impressive and very catchy number with a smooth American style", and underlined its "rich harmonies and a polished sound". By contrast, Barry McIlheney of Smash Hits stated the song is "a polite little ditty of interest only to incurable insomniacs".

== Chart performance ==
"Shattered Dreams" peaked within the top ten in the majority of the nations where it was released, including the UK where it debuted at number 92 on March 28, 1987, climbed every week until reaching a peak of number five, a position it held for three consecutive weeks, and appeared on the chart for a total of 16 weeks. This chart performance allowed the single to rank at number 59 on the national year-end chart. In Ireland, it attained number three and charted for five weeks. In Continental Europe, "Shattered Dreams" was a successful single in many countries, including Germany where it jumped to number 18 after a start at number 71 on June 22, 1987, culminated at number seven in its fourth week, and fell off the chart after 15 weeks. In addition, it was a top-ten hit in Luxembourg, Switzerland, Norway and Sweden, where it peaked at number two, five, six and seven, respectively. It made the top 15 in Italy, and was less successful in Austria, the Netherlands and the Flanders region of Belgium where it failed to entered the top 20, peaking at number 25, 26 and 36 in these nations. On the Music & Media's Pan-European charts, it charted first on the European Airplay Top 50, where it debuted at number 42 on May 2, 1987, then reached number six in its ninth week, while on the Eurochart Hot 100 singles, it started at 86 on May 16, 1987, and reached a peak of number 15 in its ninth week.

Outside Europe, "Shattered Dreams" missed the top 20 by two places in Australia. By contrast, it was a big hit in North America where it was released in 1988: on the US Billboard Hot 100, it reached number two for non consecutive three weeks, in its ninth, 11th and 12th weeks, being blocked from the number 1 slot first by Gloria Estefan and Miami Sound Machine's "Anything for You", then by George Michael's "One More Try". It made better on the Adult Contemporary chart which it topped in its seventh week, and reached number six in Canada. On the US charts mentioned above, it ranked at number 26 and 27 on their respective year-end chart of 1988.

== Track listings ==
- 7-inch and US cassette single

A. "Shattered Dreams" – 3:30
B. "My Secret Garden"

- UK maxi-cassette single

A1. "Shattered Dreams" (12-inch extended mix)
A2. "My Secret Garden"
B1. "Me and My Foolish Heart" (new version)
B2. "Living in the Past"

- 12-inch single

A1. "Shattered Dreams" (12-inch extended mix) – 5:14
B1. "Shattered Dreams" (7-inch mix) – 3:30
B2. "My Secret Garden"

- Japanese mini-album
1. "Shattered Dreams"
2. "Shattered Dreams" (extended mix)
3. "My Secret Garden"
4. "I Don't Want to Be a Hero"

== Charts ==
=== Weekly charts ===
Weekly chart performance for "Shattered Dreams"
Chart (1987–1988)	Peak position
Australia (Australian Music Report)	22
Austria (Ö3 Austria Top 40)	25
Belgium (Ultratop 50 Flanders)	36
Canada Top Singles (RPM)	6
Canada Adult Contemporary (RPM)	4
Europe (European Hot 100 Singles)	15
Europe (European Airplay Top 50)	6
Ireland (IRMA)	3
Italy (Musica e dischi)	15
Italy Airplay (Music & Media)	1
Luxembourg (Radio Luxembourg)	2
Netherlands (Dutch Top 40)	30
Netherlands (Single Top 100)	26
Norway (VG-lista)	6
Sweden (Sverigetopplistan)	7
Switzerland (Schweizer Hitparade)	5
UK Singles (Official Charts)	5
US Billboard Hot 100	2
US Adult Contemporary (Billboard)	1
US Cash Box Top 100 Singles	3
West Germany (GfK)	7

=== Year-end charts ===
1987 year-end chart performance for "Shattered Dreams"
Chart (1987)	Position
Europe (European Hot 100 Singles)	65
UK Singles (Gallup)	59
West Germany (Media Control)	62

1988 year-end chart performance for "Shattered Dreams"
Chart (1988)	Position
Canada Top Singles (RPM)	72
US Billboard Hot 100	26
US Adult Contemporary (Billboard)	27
US Cash Box Top 100 Singles	27

== Release history ==
Release dates and formats for "Shattered Dreams"
Region	Date	Format(s)	Label(s)	Ref.
United Kingdom	9 March 1987	7-inch vinyl; 12-inch vinyl	Virgin	
Japan	21 April 1988	Mini-album	Virgin	

== See also ==
- List of Hot Adult Contemporary number ones of 1988
