= Chris Spedding (album) =

Studio album by Chris Spedding
- Released: 1976
- Studio: The Château du Regard, France
- Genre: Pub rock, roots rock, rock & roll
- Label: RAK
- Producer: Mickie Most

Chris Spedding chronology
The Only Lick I Know (1972)	Chris Spedding (1976)	Hurt (1977)

Professional ratings
Review scores
Source	Rating
AllMusic	4/5 stars

Chris Spedding is the fifth, self-titled studio album by English singer-songwriter and guitarist Chris Spedding. It was a conscious attempt by Spedding to start a career under his own name and to have some 'hit singles' to establish a "Chris Spedding Sound".

== 2013 reissue ==
Chris Spedding was reissued on 14 October 2013 by Culture Factory USA, an independent label that specialises in cult artists. The reissue CD was packaged in a miniature replica of the original quality vinyl packaging complete with an inner sleeve that features the original lyrics, photographs of Spedding and credits for the album. The label side of the CD features a replica of what the original RAK label looked like at the time of issue and even features "grooves" as if the black CD is made of vinyl.

The reissues did not have any additional outtakes or bonus tracks.

== Track listing ==
All tracks composed by Chris Spedding; except where indicated

1. "New Girl in the Neighbourhood"
2. "School Days"
3. "Sweet Disposition"
4. "Bedsit Girl"
5. "Guitar Jamboree"
6. "Jump in My Car" (Ted Mulry)
7. "Hungry Man"
8. "Motor Bikin'"
9. "Catch That Train"
10. "Nervous"
11. "Boogie City"

== Personnel ==
- Chris Spedding - guitar, vocals
- Les Hurdle - bass
- Dave Cochran - bass on "Motor Bikin'"
- Brian Bennett, Tony Carr - drums
- Barry Morgan - drums on "Motor Bikin'"
- Chas Mills, Neil Lancaster, Tony Burrows - backing vocals

Technical

- Douglas Hopkins - engineer
- Gered Mankowitz - photography
