= Turn Back the Clock (album) =

Studio album by Johnny Hates Jazz
- Released: 11 January 1988
- Recorded: 1986–1987
- Studios: RAK Studios (London, UK)
- Genres: Sophisti-pop; synth-pop
- Length: 36:24
- Label: Virgin
- Producers: Calvin Hayes; Mike Nocito; Phil Thornalley

Johnny Hates Jazz chronology
Turn Back the Clock (1988)	Tall Stories (1991)

Singles from Turn Back the Clock
- 1. "Me and My Foolish Heart" Released: 1986; 2. "Shattered Dreams" Released: 9 March 1987; 3. "I Don't Want to Be a Hero" Released: August 1987; 4. "Turn Back the Clock" Released: 9 November 1987; 5. "Heart of Gold" Released: 15 February 1988; 6. "Don't Say It's Love" Released: 27 June 1988

Professional ratings
Review scores
Source	Rating
AllMusic	4/5 stars
Record Mirror	3.5/5 stars
New Musical Express	8/10
Smash Hits	5/10

Turn Back the Clock is the debut studio album by English band Johnny Hates Jazz, released by Virgin Records on 11 January 1988 in United Kingdom and on 29 March 1988 in the United States. The album, whose most famous single was "Shattered Dreams", peaked at number one on the UK Albums Chart and at number 56 on the US Billboard 200. Kim Wilde sings backing vocals on the title track, which reached number 12 on the UK Singles Chart and number 10 in New Zealand. The track "Foolish Heart" was originally released as a single in 1986 as "Me and My Foolish Heart".

The song "Listen", written and co-produced by Phil Thornalley, was later re-recorded for his solo album Swamp, also released in 1988.

== Reception ==
Michael Sutton of AllMusic wrote, "The music on Turn Back the Clock is generally upbeat synth pop, but the words are often sad. Although Johnny Hates Jazz offer no profound revelations about failed relationships or lost love, there is genuine emotion beneath the studio luster of "What Other Reason," "Different Seasons," "Don't Let It End This Way," and "Foolish Heart."". The viewer described the album as "a true guilty pleasure" with "no artistic risks yet it's too hummable to ignore."

Spin wrote, "They commit many cardinal musical sins, like being satisfied to have reached page three of their MIDI handbook, and figuring they now know everything there is to know about their new synths. This is evident from the first note. So everything has a basic beat and it’s all in synch, and so what?"

== Track listing ==
All songs written by Clark Datchler, except where noted.

=== Standard version ===
1988 original vinyl album and US CD release

1. "Shattered Dreams" – 3:26
2. "Heart of Gold" – 3:20
3. "Turn Back the Clock" – 4:30
4. "Don't Say It's Love" – 3:43
5. "What Other Reason" – 3:20
6. "I Don't Want to Be a Hero" – 3:37
7. "Listen" – 3:44 (Phil Thornalley)
8. "Different Seasons" – 3:31 (Clark Datchler, Calvin Hayes)
9. "Don't Let It End This Way" – 3:40
10. "Foolish Heart" – 3:33 (Iain Macdonald, C. Hayes, M. Nocito, P. Thornalley)

=== Bonus tracks ===
1988 CD release

11. "Heart of Gold" (J. Mendelsohn Mix) – 6:41
12. "Turn Back the Clock" (J. Mendelsohn Mix) – 7:03
13. "I Don't Want to Be a Hero" (Extended Mix) – 6:36

2008 UK remastered edition

11. "Shattered Dreams" (12" Extended Mix) – 5:11
12. "Heart of Gold" (Extended Mix) – 6:42
13. "Turn Back the Clock" (12" Extended Mix) – 7:03
14. "Don't Say It's Love" (Extended Mix) – 6:36
15. "Foolish Heart" (12" Mix) – 5:50
16. "Turn Back the Clock" (Unreleased Version) – 4:35

== Personnel ==
Credits adapted from the liner notes of Turn Back the Clock.

=== Johnny Hates Jazz ===
- Clark Datchler – lead vocals and backing vocals, synth basslines
- Calvin Hayes – keyboards
- Mike Nocito – synthesizers and drum machine

=== Additional musicians ===
- Peter-John Vettese – additional keyboards
- Chris Newman – Fairlight CMI
- J.J. Belle – electric guitar
- Neil Hubbard – electric guitar
- Frank Ricotti – percussion
- Molly Duncan – saxophones
- Neil Sidwell – trombone
- Martin Drover – trumpets
- Anne Dudley – string arrangement on "Turn Back the Clock"
- Stevie Lange – backing vocals
- Miriam Stockley – backing vocals
- Kim Wilde – backing vocals

=== Production ===
- Calvin Hayes – producer
- Mike Nocito – producer, engineer
- Phil Thornalley – co-producer on "Listen", mixing
- Greg Jackman – mixing
- Bob Kraushaar – mixing
- Julian Mendelsohn – mixing
- Matt Barry – assistant engineer
- Richard Edwards – assistant engineer
- Terry Irwin – assistant engineer
- Roy Spong – assistant engineer
- Tim Weidner – assistant engineer
- Kevin Metcalfe – mastering
- Sarm West Studios (London, UK) – mixing location
- The Townhouse (London, UK) – mastering location

=== Artwork ===
- Stylorouge – design, art direction
- Simon Fowler – photography

== Charts ==
=== Weekly charts ===
Weekly chart performance for Turn Back the Clock
Chart (1988)	Peak position
Australian Albums (Australian Music Report)	72
Austrian Albums (Ö3 Austria)	20
Canada Top Albums/CDs (RPM)	40
Dutch Albums (Album Top 100)	3
European Albums (Music & Media)	3
Finnish Albums (Suomen virallinen lista)	1
German Albums (Offizielle Top 100)	5
New Zealand Albums (RMNZ)	3
Norwegian Albums (VG-lista)	1
Swedish Albums (Sverigetopplistan)	1
Swiss Albums (Schweizer Hitparade)	4
UK Albums (Official Charts)	1
US Billboard 200	56

=== Year-end charts ===
Year-end chart performance for Turn Back the Clock
Chart (1988)	Position
Dutch Albums (Album Top 100)	37
European Albums (Music & Media)	19
German Albums (Offizielle Top 100)	31
Norwegian Winter Period Albums (VG-lista)	3
UK Albums (OCC)	23

== Certifications ==
Certifications for Turn Back the Clock
Region	Certification	Certified units/sales
Canada (Music Canada)	Gold	50,000^{^}
Hong Kong (IFPI Hong Kong)	Gold	10,000^{*}
United Kingdom (BPI)	2× Platinum	600,000^{^}
^{*} Sales figures based on certification alone.^{^} Shipments figures based on certification alone.
