= Angie Miller (British singer) =

Angie Miller, also known as Angie O'Keefe, is a British singer. She was a member of a band known as New City Sounds, which performed on the BBC television programme Opportunity Knocks. The band won twice in the talent competition. After her two appearances on Opportunity Knocks, Miller left the band and recorded music in the early 1970s under the RAK Records label, which was owned by Mickie Most, who also produced her music. She recorded two songs "Born To Be Loved By You" and "Stardust In Your Eyes", as well as an album, titled A Woman's Mind.
