= Crown of Thorns (song) =

Single by Clark Datchler

from the album Raindance
- B-side: "Widow"
- Released: 1990
- Length: 4:32 (single version); 5:07 (album version)
- Label: Virgin
- Songwriter: Clark Datchler
- Producers: Clark Datchler; Humberto Gatica

Clark Datchler singles chronology
"Things Can't Get Any Worse" (1984)	"Crown of Thorns" (1990)	"It's Better This Way" (1990)

"Crown of Thorns" is a song by English singer-songwriter Clark Datchler, which was released in 1990 as the lead single from his debut solo studio album Raindance. The song was written by Datchler, and produced by Datchler and Humberto Gatica. "Crown of Thorns" peaked at No. 100 on the UK Singles Chart.

== Background ==
Speaking of the song's lyrical message, Datchler told Simon Mayo for the Reading Evening Post in 1990: "It's about the way we no longer respect the roots of religion, especially Christianity, and the way it's become commercialised. What Jesus said actually made sense, but if he was around and died today they'd make posters of him like some football hero. I wanted to point out what was important and say that although it is abused, if you look beneath all the rubbish, [religion] does have a real point and value."

The release of "Crown of Thorns" as the lead single from Raindance was the decision of Virgin. In a 2013 interview with Paul Sinclair for Super Deluxe Edition, Datchler said how he felt the song was "a bit of a heavy subject for a pop single".

A music video was filmed to promote the single, which features Datchler performing the song, interspersed with effects and scenes relating to the lyrics.

== Critical reception ==
On its release, Alex Kadis of Smash Hits wrote, "It's undoubtedly super and musically accomplished but it's not exactly 'of the moment'. But then, if Michael Bolton can get away with slushy, epic ballads so can Datchler, and anyway, this is far smoother and grander and weepier than anything you'll have heard for a long time." Jon Wilde of Melody Maker described the song as a "blow-dried, bedridden piece of Phil Collinsesque fakery" and "the most irritating record" since Max Bygraves' 1954 hit "Gilly Gilly Ossenfeffer Katzenellen Bogen by the Sea".

Bob Eborall of the Ealing Leader considered the song "a tuneful, pleading track" which "could score [Datchler a hit]". Music & Media listed the song as a "sure hit" and described it as a "well-arranged song" but felt it was "sadly let down by some awkward lyrics in the verses". They added: "Tortured artists do not make great pop music."

== Track listing ==
7" single

1. "Crown of Thorns" - 4:32
2. "Widow" - 3:40

12" and CD single

1. "Crown of Thorns" - 5:07
2. "Widow" - 3:40
3. "Shattered Dreams" (Acoustic Version) - 3:25

CD single (UK #2)

1. "Crown of Thorns" - 5:07
2. "Widow" - 3:40
3. "Shattered Dreams" (Acoustic Version) - 3:25
4. "Crown of Thorns" (Instrumental Version) - 5:07

CD single (Japanese release)

1. "Crown of Thorns" - 4:32
2. "Shattered Dreams" (Acoustic Version) - 3:25

== Personnel ==
Crown of Thorns

- Clark Datchler - vocals, keyboards
- The Giant - guitar
- Nathan East - bass
- John Robinson - drums
- Simon Franglen, Albert Boekholt - programming

Production

- Clark Datchler - producer (all tracks)
- Humberto Gatica - producer and engineer on "Crown of Thorns"
- Nick Davis - mixing on "Crown of Thorns" and "Widow", engineer on "Crown of Thorns"
- Bob Kraushaar - engineer on "Crown of Thorns"
- Chris Blaire - mastering

Other

- Richard Haughton - photography
- Stylorouge - design

== Charts ==
Chart (1990)	Peak position
Netherlands (Single Top 100)	47
UK Singles (Official Charts)	100
