= New World (band) =

Australian band

- Origin: Brisbane, Queensland, Australia
- Genres: Pop
- Years active: 1965–1976, 1988–1992, 2010
- Labels: Parlophone, Decca, RAK, EMI
- Past members: John "Fuzzy" Lee; Mel Noonan; Robert Elford; John Kane

New World was an Australian pop band formed in Brisbane, Queensland in 1965. They are best known for their top 10 hit single, "Tom-Tom Turnaround", which was released in 1971. Most of their biggest successes were written by Nicky Chinn and Mike Chapman.

== Career ==
The band was founded in Brisbane, Queensland in 1965, by John "Fuzzy" Lee, Mel Noonan and Robert Elford, and were billed as The New World Trio. All three sang and played guitar. In 1968, John Kane joined the group, replacing Elford. Now known as The New World, the group recorded a hit single in Australia (a version of "Try To Remember", which peaked at #11 nationally) followed quickly by their first album. Shortly thereafter, the group moved to the UK in an effort to launch an international career, and became simply New World (no "The").

At the beginning of the 1970s, songwriters Nicky Chinn and Mike Chapman booked the group on television. They also took the band to Europe, where record label owner Mickie Most signed them immediately to his imprint RAK. Their first single for RAK was a cover of Billy Joe Royal's "Rose Garden", which hit number 15 on the UK Singles Chart in 1971. It came out almost simultaneously with country singer Lynn Anderson's version of "Rose Garden", which was released in late 1970 and was an international number one hit single.

The group's biggest hit was a version of "Tom-Tom Turnaround", also recorded by the Sweet. This was followed by "Kara, Kara", which was a hit in the United Kingdom, Germany and Australia; although a German language version of the tune was a bigger hit for Peter Orloff. They had a fourth hit in the United Kingdom with "Sister Jane", but their next release, "Living Next Door to Alice", was a flop in the UK (though it hit top 20 in their home country of Australia). However, this song would later become better known as a worldwide hit for Smokie in 1976.

In the early 1970s, New World were musical guests on the BBC shows, The Two Ronnies in 1971 and The Morecambe and Wise Show in 1973. In 1973 New World for the first time on live performances had a three piece backing band consisting of Brian Willoughby (ex Strawbs) on guitar, Alan Wood on bass and Roy Simmonite on drums who both went on to become members of Jimmy James and The Vagabonds.

The group appeared on the British talent show Opportunity Knocks. They were at the centre of a trial over alleged fixing of the results of the show. The events were covered in John G. Lee's March 2005 book, New World Guilty: Vice and Payola Scandals Oust Watergate.

New World's last releases were issued in 1976.

== Discography ==
=== Albums ===
Title	Details
The New World	Released: 1969; Format: LP; Label: Parlophone (PCSO-7556)
New World	Released: 1971; Format: LP; Label: Columbia (SCXO-8002)
Believe in Music	Released: 1973; Format: LP, Cassette; Label: RAK (SRAK 506)
Yesterday's Gone	Released: 1975; Format: LP, Cassette; Label: EMI (EMC 3072)

=== Singles ===
Year	Single	Peak chart positions					
Year	Single	AUS		GER	IRE	NZ	UK
Year	Single	Go-Set	KMR	GER	IRE	NZ	UK
1968	"Try to Remember" (Australia-only release)	12	11	—	—	—	—
1969	"Feed the Birds" (Australia-only release)	—	—	—	—	—	—
1970	"I'll Catch the Sun"	—	—	—	—	—	—
1970	"Something's Wrong"	—	—	—	—	—	—
1971	"Rose Garden"	—	—	—	—	—	15
1971	"Tom-Tom Turnaround"	24	23	10	3	3	6
1971	"Kara, Kara"	—	53	31	—	2	17
1972	"Sister Jane"	16	19	47	2	2	9
1972	"Living Next Door to Alice"	31	20	—	—	—	—
1973	"Rooftop Singing"	—	51	—	—	—	50
1973	"Old Shep"	—	—	—	—	—	—
1974	"Do It Again"	—	—	—	—	—	—
1974	"Sweet Dreams"	—	—	—	—	—	—
1974	"I'm a Clown"	—	—	—	—	—	—
1975	"Sitting in the Sun"	—	—	—	—	—	—
1976	"But Not Afraid to Dream"	—	—	—	—	—	—
1976	"Homemade Sunshine"	—	—	—	—	33	—
"—" denotes releases that did not chart or were not released
