= I Don't Want to Be a Hero =

"I Don't Want to be a Hero"

Single by Johnny Hates Jazz

from the album Turn Back the Clock
- B-side: "The Cage"
- Released: August 1987 (UK); October 1987 (US)
- Recorded: 1986–1987
- Genre: Synth-pop; sophisti-pop
- Length: 3:37
- Label: Virgin
- Songwriter: Clark Datchler
- Producers: Calvin Hayes; Mike Nocito

Johnny Hates Jazz singles chronology
"Shattered Dreams" (1987)	"I Don't Want to be a Hero" (1987)	"Turn Back the Clock" (1987)

"I Don't Want to Be a Hero" is a 1987 song by the British band Johnny Hates Jazz. It reached #11 in the UK top 40 in August 1987 spending 10 weeks on the chart. It is taken from their #1 album Turn Back the Clock.

== Writing and inspiration ==
The song was written by the band's lead singer and main songwriter, Clark Datchler. It has a strong anti-war sentiment and is written from the perspective of a soldier who is questioning their participation in what they consider an unjust war. The band's American record company were reluctant to release the single in the U.S. because of its anti-war stance. The song makes references to conscription and propaganda.

In a 1987 interview with Record Mirror, Datchler said, "It's a very profound song but I'm not about to preach to anyone. All my songs are observations and the nice thing about 'I Don't Want to be a Hero' is that you've got a serious subject and putting it with quite a poppy musical backing. I don't think people get involved enough with lyrics in the pop field."

== Music video ==
The international music video for the song was directed by Andy Morahan.

== Critical reception ==
Jerry Smith of British magazine Music Week described "I Don't Want to Be a Hero" a "slick and polished pop song", but deemed it "lacks infectious edge" of "Shattered Dreams". In a review published in Smash Hits, Vici McDonald described the song as being "extremely polished and springhtly but it's so blandly anonymous that it could be by practically anybody", adding that Johnny Hates Jazz are just one of many interchangeable men bands "playing jazzy, breezalong white funk".

== Charts ==
=== Weekly charts ===
Weekly chart performance for "I Don't Want to Be a Hero"
Chart (1987–1988)	Peak position
Australia (Kent Music Report)	76
Austria (Ö3 Austria Top 40)	22
Belgium (Ultratop 50 Flanders)	16
Canada Top Singles (RPM)	17
Europe (European Hot 100 Singles)	8
Finland (Suomen virallinen lista)	16
France (SNEP)	32
Ireland (IRMA)	13
Italy (Musica e dischi)	13
Luxembourg (Radio Luxembourg)	9
Netherlands (Dutch Top 40)	25
Netherlands (Single Top 100)	25
Sweden (Sverigetopplistan)	10
Switzerland (Schweizer Hitparade)	12
UK Singles (Official Charts)	11
UK Dance (Music Week)	10
US Billboard Hot 100	31
US Adult Contemporary (Billboard)	15
US Dance Club Songs (Billboard)	19
US Cash Box Top 100 Singles	30
West Germany (GfK)	17

=== Year-end charts ===
Year-end chart performance for "I Don't Want to Be a Hero"
Chart (1987)	Position
Europe (European Hot 100 Singles)	84

== Covers ==
In 1988, Japanese singer Yōko Nagayama covered the song, "反逆のヒーロー".

== See also ==
- List of anti-war songs
