= Turn Back the Clock (song) =

1987 single by Johnny Hates Jazz

Single by Johnny Hates Jazz

from the album Turn Back the Clock
- B-side: "Cracking Up"
- Released: 9 November 1987
- Recorded: 1987
- Genre: Sophisti-pop
- Length: 4:30 (album version); 4:18 (single version)
- Label: Virgin
- Songwriter: Clark Datchler
- Producers: Calvin Hayes; Mike Nocito

Johnny Hates Jazz singles chronology
| "I Don't Want to be a Hero" (1987) | "Turn Back the Clock" (1987) | "Heart of Gold" (1988) |

Music video
- Listen to "Turn Back the Clock" on YouTube

"Turn Back the Clock" is a song by the British band Johnny Hates Jazz. It is the title track of their debut album and was the third single release from the LP. The song features back-up vocals from English singer Kim Wilde, who was dating Johnny Hates Jazz keyboardist Calvin Hayes at the time.

The song peaked at No. 12 in the UK top 40 in 1987. It also reached number five on the US Adult Contemporary chart. There is also a previously unreleased version, that has some minor changes from the original song, including more backing guitar, and saxophone.

== Music video ==
The international music video for the song was directed by Brian Grant. The video was filmed in Cold Spring, NY in fall 1987.

== Critical reception ==
Upon its release as a single, Robin Smith of Record Mirror described "Turn Back the Clock" as "hopelessly twee and contrived" and added, "Rock out and loosen up, guys." Richard Lowe of Smash Hits stated that the song is exactly like the band's look, namely "not particularly special but lovingly scrubbed and polished and pleasant enough" and as "good" as the band's previous singles, while being "a bit slower". Writing for Music Week, Jerry Smith called it a "slickly produced, medium paced ballad", adding that "it might not be as catchy as their previous efforts but mass radio play is assured."

== Charts ==
=== Weekly charts ===
Weekly chart performance for "Turn Back the Clock"
| Chart (1987–1988) | Peak position |
|---|---|
| Belgium (Ultratop 50 Flanders) | 9 |
| Europe (European Hot 100 Singles) | 37 |
| Finland (Suomen virallinen lista) | 12 |
| Iceland (Íslenski Listinn Topp 10) | 1 |
| Ireland (IRMA) | 17 |
| Italy (Musica e dischi) | 16 |
| Italy Airplay (Music & Media) | 5 |
| Luxembourg (Radio Luxembourg) | 11 |
| Netherlands (Dutch Top 40) | 5 |
| Netherlands (Single Top 100) | 6 |
| New Zealand (Recorded Music NZ) | 3 |
| Sweden (Sverigetopplistan) | 20 |
| UK Singles (Official Charts) | 12 |
| US Adult Contemporary (Billboard) | 5 |
| West Germany (GfK) | 19 |

=== Year-end charts ===
1988 year-end chart performance for "Turn Back the Clock"
| Chart (1988) | Position |
|---|---|
| Belgium (Ultratop 50 Flanders) | 71 |
| Netherlands (Dutch Top 40) | 51 |
| Netherlands (Single Top 100) | 78 |

1989 year-end chart performance for "Turn Back the Clock"
| Chart (1989) | Position |
|---|---|
| US Adult Contemporary (Billboard) | 42 |
