= Heart of Gold (Johnny Hates Jazz song) =

1987 song by Johnny Hates Jazz

Single by Johnny Hates Jazz

from the album Turn Back the Clock
- B-side: "Leave It Up to Me"
- Released: 15 February 1988
- Length: 3:20
- Label: Virgin
- Songwriter: Clark Datchler
- Producers: Calvin Hayes; Mike Nocito

Johnny Hates Jazz singles chronology
"Turn Back the Clock" (1987)	"Heart of Gold" (1988)	"Don't Say It's Love" (1988)

Music video
- "Heart of Gold" on YouTube

"Heart of Gold" is a song by English band Johnny Hates Jazz, released by Virgin in 1988 as the fourth single from their debut studio album Turn Back the Clock (1987). The song was written by Clark Datchler and produced by Calvin Hayes and Mike Nocito. It reached number 19 in the UK Singles Chart and remained in the top 100 for seven weeks.

== Background ==
Lead vocalist and writer Clark Datchler was inspired to write "Heart of Gold" after talking to a prostitute he met in Los Angeles. He told Sunday World in 1988,

"[It's] a song about prostitutes, about how you don't stop to think that they were once schoolgirls, once played hockey and that sort of thing. I've always been quite embarrassed by prostitutes, but I had to talk to one to write the song. She was a very high-class prostitute, but there was something sad about her eyes and the front she put up. I was chatting her up in a bar in Los Angeles and an American guy pulled me aside and told me she was a hooker. I was shocked. So then I thought I would ask her about what she was doing. She really didn't open up as much as I hoped she would. But it's not at all an offensive song – it's just an observation of the person I met: a very street-wise and high-class sort of girl."

Musically, the song was partly inspired by Rick James' "Mr. Policeman", a song from his 1981 album Street Songs. Recalling "Heart of Gold" in 2021, Datchler told Will Harris, "It was a semi-reggae track, big horn section. It turned out to be a good track." He added that it was a "really good recording" and one which provides a "good illustration of my [musical] influences as a kid".

== Release ==
Ahead of the single's release, a national competition was launched by Virgin Records in partnership with Kodak for the design of the picture sleeve. The competition, which received approximately 3,000 entries, was won by 16-year-old Nicole Redican, who submitted a photograph she took of her 15-year-old friend, Andrea Newton. Newton subsequently posed for a new photograph taken by Simon Fowler and Nicole Redican assisted in the sleeve design. A feature on their winning entry appeared on the BBC1 children's television programme Going Live! on 16 January 1988.

== Music video ==
The song's music video was directed by David Fincher.

== Critical reception ==
Upon its release, Max Bell of Number One gave "Heart of Gold" a three out of five star rating and commented, "Ostensibly a song about a lady of the night, it drifts into the subconscious before you can say 'hang on, I don't usually fall for innocuous songs like this'. Still, it's stylish, if eminently forgettable." Eleanor Levy of Record Mirror described it as a "slightly more up-tempo number [that] never quite manages to break out of its cosy, lolloping trot". She added, "Yet the Johnnies do write exceedingly good tunes and their slickness is expertly, even lovingly, crafted."

John Lee of the Huddersfield Daily Examiner praised the song as "punchy and crisp" and felt that the "tale of a prostitute set to a bouncy back track is bound to give the[m] another hit". Music & Media noted it "luckily [has] a bit more bite and spice" than the "drooling" "Turn Back the Clock". They added, "A sometimes very Level 42-like drive is coupled with some effective brass and a joyful chorus."

== Track listing ==
7–inch single (UK, Europe and Australasia)

1. "Heart of Gold" – 3:28
2. "Leave It Up to Me" – 3:22

7–inch limited edition, numbered box set (UK)

1. "Heart of Gold" – 3:28
2. "Leave It Up to Me" – 3:22

12–inch single (UK, Europe and Australasia)

1. "Heart of Gold" (Extended Version) – 6:41
2. "Leave It Up to Me" – 3:22
3. "Heart of Gold" – 3:28

CD and cassette limited edition single (UK)

1. "Heart of Gold" – 3:28
2. "Leave It Up to Me" – 3:22
3. "Heart of Gold" (Extended Mix) – 6:41
4. "The Cage" – 3:59

== Personnel ==
Credits are adapted from the Turn Back the Clock vinyl LP liner notes and the UK 12-single vinyl single.

Johnny Hates Jazz

- Clark Datchler
- Mike Nocito
- Calvin Hayes

Additional musicians

- Stevie Lang – backing vocals
- Miriam Stockley – backing vocals

Production

- Calvin Hayes – producer
- Mike Nocito – producer
- Will Gosling – remix engineer ("Heart of Gold")

Other

- Nicole Redican – sleeve design
- Simon Fowler – photography (front sleeve)
- Sheila Rock – photography (back sleeve)
- Andrea – model

== Charts ==
Chart (1988)	Peak position
Australia (Music Report)	87
Belgium (Ultratop 50 Flanders)	30
Europe (Eurochart Hot 100 Singles)	64
Germany (GfK)	55
Ireland (IRMA)	19
Luxembourg (Radio Luxembourg)	16
Netherlands (Dutch Top 40)	26
Netherlands (Single Top 100)	27
New Zealand (Recorded Music NZ)	18
UK Singles (Official Charts)	19
