= Magnetized (album) =

Studio album by Johnny Hates Jazz
- Released: May 24, 2013 (UK)
- Recorded: 2011–12
- Genre: Pop rock, synth-pop
- Length: 46:20
- Label: InterAction Music
- Producer: Mike Nocito, Clark Datchler

Johnny Hates Jazz chronology
Best of the '80s (2000)	Magnetized (2013)	Wide Awake (2020)

Singles from Magnetized
- 1. "Magnetized" Released: 2013

Magnetized is the third studio album by Johnny Hates Jazz released on May 24, 2013. This album was the band's first album in 22 years, after Tall Stories and the departure of members Calvin Hayes and Phil Thornalley, and the return of founding vocalist Clark Datchler. The album, was followed by the release of the same-titled lead single, along with a corresponding music video. The album peaked at No. 102 in the UK sales chart and No. 23 in the UK indie albums chart.

== Critical reception ==
Professional ratings
Review scores
Source	Rating
AllMusic	3.5/5 stars

Upon release Magnetized received highly favorable reviews from critics. Radio Creme Brulee stated that the album might be 2013's "pop album of the year". Nick Pett of Backseat Mafia gave the album a more mixed review, but later said that the album "isn't all bad.."

Ivan Nikitin ("Musecube") wrote that Magnetized "is definitely worth [your] attention.".

== Track listing ==
All songs written by Datchler and produced by Nocito.

No.	Title	Length
1.	"Magnetized"	3:54
2.	"Man With No Name"	4:00
3.	"The Road Not Taken"	4:59
4.	"You Belong to You"	4:27
5.	"Release You"	5:40
6.	"Nevermore"	4:23
7.	"Ghost of Love"	5:06
8.	"Lighthouse"	4:57
9.	"Goodbye Sweet Yesterday"	4:37
10.	"Eternal"	4:17
Total length:		46:20

== Personnel ==
Johnny Hates Jazz

- Clark Datchler – vocals, keyboards, acoustic piano, synth bass (1–5, 7–10)
- Mike Nocito – programming

Additional musicians

- Jamie Muhoberac – keyboards (1–4, 8)
- Pete Watson – keyboards (1, 4)
- Berenice Scott – keyboards (2, 5), backing vocals (3, 7)
- Anne Dudley – keyboards (3, 7, 10), string arrangements (3, 7, 10)
- Marcus Bonfanti – guitars (1, 4, 7)
- David Munday – guitars (1–5, 7, 10)
- Neil Taylor – guitars (5, 6)
- David Rhodes – guitars (8, 9)
- Alex Reeves – drums
- Lily Gonzalez – percussion (1, 4, 7)
- Frank Ricotti – percussion
- Vince de la Cruz – tambourine (1, 4, 7), bass guitar (6)
- Alex Cooper – chant (8)
- Phil Nichol – chant (8)
- Steve Stewart – chant (8)

== Production ==
- Mike Nocito – producer, engineer
- Stephen M. Tayler – mixing
- Tony Cousins – mastering
- Rob O'Connor – art direction
- Mark Higenbottam – design, illustration
- Stylorouge – design, illustration
- Simon Fowler – photography
- Alyson Fennell – stylist
- Karen Mason – hair, make-up
- John Wooler – management
