= Calvin Hayes =

- Born: 27 November 1962; London, United Kingdom
- Died: 9 July 2026 (aged 63); Spokane, Washington, United States
- Occupation: Musician
- Spouse: Kathy Hayes
- Children: 1
- Relatives: Mickie Most (father)
- Musical career
- Genres: Rock; Pop rock
- Instruments: Keyboard; drums
- Formerly of: Johnny Hates Jazz; Hot Club

Calvin G. Hayes (November 27, 1962 – July 9, 2026) was a British musician, keyboardist, drummer, and music producer. He co-founded the 1980s British pop band Johnny Hates Jazz, which had several Top 20 singles in the United Kingdom, including "Shattered Dreams," together with vocalist Clark Datchler and Mike Nocito. Hayes was the band's keyboardist and co-produced its music.

== Biography ==
=== Early life and career ===
Calvin Hayes was born in London, England, on November 27, 1962, as one of three children of Mickie Most and his wife, Christina. His father, Mickie Most, was an English record producer and founder of Rak Records. Hayes stated that he learned to read by reading record labels and developed an early interest in music. He learned the piano and began playing in local bands as a teenager.

Hayes and Clark Datchler (the future vocalist of Johnny Hates Jazz) were members of a band called Hot Club, alongside Glen Matlock, the former original guitarist for the Sex Pistols.

Hayes played drums for English singer Kim Wilde's 1981 touring band after the success of her debut single, "Kids in America". Wilde and Hayes also dated for several years and remained friends after their break-up.

=== Johnny Hates Jazz ===
After the Hot Club broke up, Hayes and Datchler reunited when both were employed at Hayes' father's Rak Records. Hayes was working as a A&R talent scout, while Datchler was a label song writer. The two met Mike Nocito, a sound engineer who had worked with Duran Duran and The Police, while he was also working at Rak Records.

Hayes, Datchler, and Nocito formed a band, to be called Johnny Hates Jazz, and released their first single in 1986, "Me and My Foolish Heart." Hayes, a talent scout, initially told his father, label president Mickie Most, that he had discovered the new band, before revealing that the three Rak Records employees had formed Johnny Hates Jazz. Their first single was a commercial slop, but Hayes managed to hold a Johnny Hates Jazz performance at the Ronnie Scott's Jazz Club (chosen to match the band's name) for other A&R talent scouts from other record labels. The show proved successful and Virgin Records recruited and signed Hayes' band.

The band's second single, "Shattered Dreams", released in March 1987 under Virgin Records, slowly climbed in popularity before reaching number 5 in the United Kingdom. In 1988, "Shattered Dreams" reached number 2 on the Billboard Hot 100 in the United States, thanks partly to a new music video shot in black-and-white by director David Fincher. Calivin Hayes' father, RaK Records founder Mickie Most, said he would stand naked in the storefront windows of Selfridges on Oxford Street in London if "Shattered Dreams" became a hit, though he never followed through with his promise.

In 1988, Johnny Hates Jazz released their hit debut album, Turn Back the Clock, which the band members, including Hayes recorded and produced basically themselves on a very short deadline, largely due to the unexpected success for their second single, "Shattered Dreams." The album reached number 1 in the UK, sold four million copies, and produced three hit singles in the UK, including two Top 20 hits: "Heart of Gold", "I Don't Want to Be a Hero", and "Turn Back the Clock". (Hayes recruited his girlfriend, singer Kim Wilde, to sing backup vocals for the "Turn Back the Clock" single). However, despite the album's success, lead singer Clark Datchler announced that he would leave the band while still recording the album, citing creative differences in the band's music between himself and his two bandmates, Hayes and Nocito.

After Datchler left Johnny Hates Jazz in 1988 at the height of its popularity, Hayes and Nocito continued with the band. They recruited Phil Thornalley, a former touring bassist with The Cure, as Datchler's replacement and began work on a sophomore album.

In 1991, Hayes and bandmate Phil Thornalley ware involved in a serious car accident. Hayes suffered life threatening injuries in the crash. He was confined to a full body cast for one year and required long-term rehabilitation during his recovery. Johnny Hates Jazz's second album, Tall Stories, which was delayed by Hayes' car accident, was finally released in 1992, but it failed to chart. The band broke up later in 1992. Hayes largely left the public music industry during the rest of the 1990s and 2000s.

In 2009, Hayes rejoined the original Johnny Hates Jazz line-up in 2009 with Clark Datchler and Mike Nocito. Together, performed several live reunion concerts in Europe and Southeast Asia. Hayes left Johnny Hates Jazz in 2010, citing personal reasons and the stress for the live concert schedule. Datchler and Nocito released a new LP following Hayes' departure.

=== Later life ===
Hayes and his wife, Kathy, moved to Spokane, Washington, in the United States, where he taught music.

Calvin Hayes died on July 9, 2026, at the age of 63 after collapsing at his home in Spokane, Washington,. He was survived by his wife, Kathy Hayes, and son, Alex Hayes. His death was confirmed by his wife and his former bandmates from Johnny Hates Jazz.
