= Let Me Fly (album) =

Studio album by Mike + The Mechanics
- Released: 7 April 2017
- Studio: The Farm (Surrey) Metrophonic Studios (London)
- Genre: Pop rock
- Length: 50:42
- Label: BMG
- Producer: Brian Rawling; Harry Rutherford; Mark Taylor; Mike Rutherford; Paul Meehan

Mike + The Mechanics chronology
The Road (2011)	Let Me Fly (2017)	Out of the Blue (2019)

Singles from Mike + The Mechanics
- 1. "Don't Know What Came Over Me" Released: 2017; 2. "The Best Is Yet to Come" Released: 2017

Professional ratings
Review scores
Source	Rating
AllMusic	2.5/5 stars

Let Me Fly is the eighth studio album by Mike + The Mechanics, released in 2017 by BMG.

== Track listing ==
No.	Title	Writer(s)	Producer(s)	Length
1.	"Let Me Fly"	Mike Rutherford, Clark Datchler, Andrew Roachford	M. Rutherford, Brian Rawling, Paul Meehan	4:42
2.	"Are You Ready?"	M. Rutherford, Datchler, Tim Howar	M. Rutherford, Rawling, Meehan	4:27
3.	"Wonder"	M. Rutherford, Datchler, Roachford	M. Rutherford, Rawling, Meehan	4:36
4.	"The Best Is Yet to Come"	M. Rutherford, Datchler	M. Rutherford, Rawling, Meehan	4:00
5.	"Save the World"	M. Rutherford, Datchler, Roachford	M. Rutherford, Rawling, Meehan	4:42
6.	"Don't Know What Came Over Me"	M. Rutherford, Datchler, Roachford	M. Rutherford, Rawling, Meehan	4:20
7.	"High Life"	M. Rutherford, Ed Drewett	Harry Rutherford, M. Rutherford	2:49
8.	"The Letter"	M. Rutherford, Mark Taylor, Patrick Mascall, Datchler, Roachford	Taylor, M. Rutherford	4:55
9.	"Not Out of Love"	M. Rutherford, Roachford, Howar	H. Rutherford, M. Rutherford	4:17
10.	"Love Left Over"	M. Rutherford, Datchler, Howar	H. Rutherford, M. Rutherford	3:27
11.	"I'll Be There for You"	M. Rutherford, Taylor, Mascall, Roachford	Taylor, M. Rutherford	3:31
12.	"Save My Soul"	M. Rutherford, Roachford, Fraser Thorneycroft-Smith	H. Rutherford, M. Rutherford	4:49
Total length:				50:42

== Personnel ==
Mike and The Mechanics

- Mike Rutherford – electric guitars, bass guitar, drum programming, backing vocals
- Tim Howar – lead vocals (2, 4, 7, 10), backing vocals
- Andrew Roachford – lead vocals (1, 3, 5, 6, 8, 9, 11, 12), backing vocals, keyboards
- Luke Juby – keyboards
- Anthony Drennan – electric guitars
- Gary Wallis – drums

Additional personnel

- Clark Datchler – acoustic piano (5, 6, 9)
- Zak Kemp – drum programming (5, 6)
- Patrick Mascall – programming (8, 11)
- Xavier Barnett, Godfrey Gayle, Priscilla Jones-Campbell, Cherrice Kirton, Joy Malcolm and Subrina McCalla – choir (1)

== Production ==
- Harry Rutherford – engineer, mixing
- Dick Beetham – mastering
- Neal Panchal – art direction, design
- Mike Rutherford – art concept
- Joe Waghorn – artwork
- Martin Griffin – digital imaging
- Patrick "Paddy" Balls – photography
- Tony Smith – manager
- Stephen Roachford – manager

Studios

- Recorded at The Farm (Chiddingfold, Surrey, UK); Metrophonic Studios (London, UK); Mike's Home Studio.
- Mastered at 360 Mastering (Hastings, East Sussex, UK).

== Charts ==
Chart (2017)	Peak position
Belgian Albums (Ultratop Flanders)	147
Belgian Albums (Ultratop Wallonia)	146
German Albums (Offizielle Top 100)	51
Scottish Albums (Official Charts)	6
Swiss Albums (Schweizer Hitparade)	20
UK Albums (Official Charts)	9
UK Independent Albums (Official Charts)	2
