= Clark Datchler =

English singer-songwriter (born 1964)

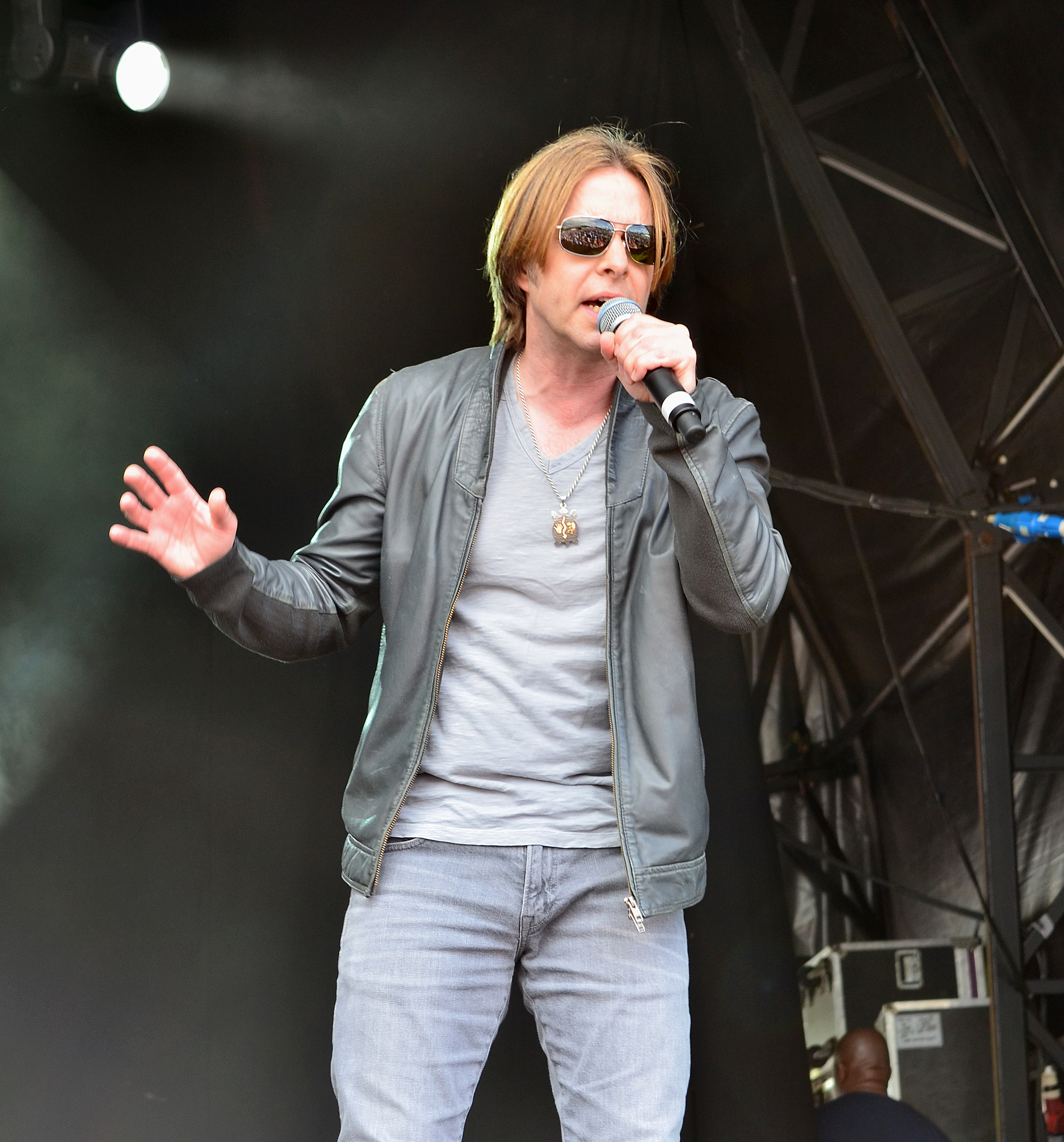
- Clark Datchler performing with Johnny Hates Jazz in 2014

Background information
- Born: Clark Wynford Datchler
- Origin: Surrey, England
- Genres: Pop; sophisti-pop
- Occupations: Musician; singer; songwriter; producer
- Instruments: Vocals; piano; keyboards; bouzouki; guitar
- Years active: 1981–present
- Labels: InterAction Music; Virgin; RAK; Bluebird
- Formerly of: Johnny Hates Jazz
- Website: clarkdatchler.com

Clark Wynford Datchler (born 1964 in Surrey, England) is an English singer-songwriter and record producer. He first rose to fame in 1987 as the lead singer, songwriter and multi-instrumentalist in the pop band Johnny Hates Jazz.

== Early career ==
Datchler was influenced by his father Fred Datchler, a singer and saxophonist in two popular vocal groups of the 1950s, the Stargazers and the Polkadots. The Stargazers were the first British group to have a No. 1 hit on the UK chart, and had their own weekly radio show on the BBC. Later, as a member of the Polkadots, Fred sang with Ella Fitzgerald, Frank Sinatra, the Beatles, Jo Stafford, Peggy Lee and Petula Clark (after whom Clark is named). They regularly topped the Melody Maker poll for best vocal group.

Datchler's first single, "You Fooled Him Once Again", was released when he was 17 on the London soul label Blue Inc. The record featured Julie Roberts of Working Week, and two members of the reggae band Aswad: drummer Angus "Drummie Zeb" Gaye, and bassist George "Ras Levi" Oban. He went on to be produced by Rusty Egan of electronic pioneers Visage, recording at Trident Studios in London.

Shortly after, he signed a music publishing deal with Warner Bros. Records, and moved to LA when he was 18 to write for other artists. The following year, he returned to London and joined the band Hot Club, signed to RAK Records. His fellow band members were Glenn Matlock of the Sex Pistols and Rich Kids, guitarist James Stevenson of Chelsea and Generation X and Calvin Hayes (later part of Johnny Hates Jazz). They released one single, "It Ain't Me, Girl" and performed at London's Marquee Club. Following this performance, he was signed as a solo artist to RAK by record producer and RAK boss Mickie Most (producer of the Animals, the Yardbirds, Donovan, Suzi Quatro, Hot Chocolate and Kim Wilde), who suggested he work with a young producer-engineer at RAK Studios, Mike Nocito. Datchler subsequently released the singles "I Don't Want You" (produced by Most) and "Things Can't Get Any Worse".

== Johnny Hates Jazz ==
Datchler became a member of Johnny Hates Jazz alongside production team Calvin Hayes and Mike Nocito in 1986. The band released their first single, "Me and My Foolish Heart", on RAK Records in that year. The single did not achieve success. However, as soon as Datchler began to write the songs for the band, a showcase was held at Ronnie Scott's Jazz Club where the group performed in front of several record labels. They signed with Virgin Records, and Datchler's best-known song, "Shattered Dreams", was released in spring 1987. The single was a success worldwide, reaching No. 5 in the UK and No. 2 in Japan and the US (as well as No. 1 on the Billboard AOR chart). Several international hits followed, including the anti-war anthem "I Don't Want to Be a Hero" and "Turn Back the Clock". The band's debut album, Turn Back the Clock, was released in January 1988 and reached No. 1 in the UK, going double platinum. Datchler wrote most of the songs on this album, including all of the band's hits.

Along with being signed to Virgin Records, Datchler signed a music publishing agreement with Virgin Music Publishing.

== Solo work ==
Datchler left Johnny Hates Jazz in 1988 at the height of his fame. He moved to Amsterdam and began work on a solo album called Raindance. The album featured other musicians, including bass player Nathan East, drummer John "JR" Robinson and percussionist Paulinho Da Costa. Also featured was guitarist Dave Gregory of XTC. The album saw Datchler's first environmental song, "Raindance" – one of several to follow.

The first single from Raindance was "Crown of Thorns". It was released in the UK in 1990 but was not a success. The Raindance album was later released on Virgin Records in Japan.

In 1991, Datchler went back into the studio to record some tracks with Rupert Hine, producer of Tina Turner, the Fixx and Howard Jones. The new album was titled Fishing for Souls. However, when the relationship between Virgin Records and Datchler deteriorated further, he left the label. Fishing for Souls was not officially released by Virgin, but was eventually made available as a bootleg.

Around this time, Datchler also released a remixed version of "The Last Emotion" under the name Medicine Wheel. The song was released on 7" as a single, but it was also released as a CD with "Close to the Edge" and "Autumn Years" in the tracklist in 1992 on Virgin Records, around the same time that Fishing for Souls was completed.

By the mid-1990s, Datchler had moved back to Britain where he based himself at Peter Gabriel's Real World Studios outside the city of Bath. There, he taught himself to play the bouzouki, drums and percussion, and refined his abilities as a pianist, keyboard player, bassist and guitarist. He also began to experiment with combining world and folk instruments with contemporary instruments and modern grooves. The recordings he made at Real World eventually led to the beginning of the writing and recording of the album Tomorrow.

In 1998, Datchler signed a music publishing deal with BMG Music.

In the 2000s, Datchler based himself in the U.S. He decided to make an album with an environmental theme, and consequently began work on Tomorrow. He played many of the instruments on the album as well as producing, engineering and mixing. He invited several notable musicians to record with him, including Phil Gould (drummer of Level 42), David Rhodes (guitarist with Peter Gabriel), James McNally (Irish whistle and bodhran player of Afro Celt Sound System), Hugh Marsh (fiddle player with Loreena McKennitt), Phil Beer (mandolin player of Show of Hands) and Joji Hirota (shakuhachi player). He recorded much of the 12-track album in a state-of-the-art studio powered by solar energy. One of the songs was a new recording of his first hit with Johnny Hates Jazz, "Shattered Dreams". The completed version of Tomorrow was released on InterAction Music in May 2007. This album was originally released under the pseudonym of Nightfoxx, but Datchler subsequently returned to recording and performing under his original name. In 2009, it was remixed by Stephen W Tayler, and digitally remastered and re-released. In 2009, Datchler acquired the rights to the album. It was remixed by Tayler, digitally remastered and in 2010 it was released on Datchler's own label, Interaction Music.

Datchler also signed a music publishing deal with Stage Three Music, part of BMG Rights Management.

Datchler rejoined Johnny Hates Jazz in late 2009, and in 2010 they played live shows in Europe and Southeast Asia.

In October 2010, Datchler received a BMI Film & TV Award in recognition of "Shattered Dreams" achieving over three million broadcast performances in the U.S. alone.

He subsequently started working with Mike Nocito on the Johnny Hates Jazz album, Magnetized, which was published in 2013, followed by a few live concerts in 2014.

In 2016 and 2017, he co-wrote eight songs on the Mike and the Mechanics album, Let Me Fly.

== Recent work ==
In 2020, Datchler and Nocito released a new single called "Spirit of Love" and announced that a new album known as Wide Awake would be coming out in August of that year. They then released the subsequent singles "New Day Ahead" and "Greater Good" after the release of the album.

In 2022, the retrospective Journey Songs 1 boxset was released, containing remastered versions of the albums Raindance and Fishing for Souls as well as rare tracks and demos.

Datchler released the charity single "Shattered Dreams of Ukraine" on digital platforms in November 2022 in support of Poland Welcomes. It climbed to number 6 on the UK's Heritage Chart on 8 January 2023.

== Personal life ==
Datchler married Dutch television presenter Simone Walraven in 1990. They have one daughter. Datchler and Walraven ran their own music production company for the next twenty years. They decided to split up in 2009.

== Discography ==
=== Albums ===
- 1990: Raindance
- 1992: Fishing for Souls
- 2007: Tomorrow

=== Singles ===
Title	Year
"You Fooled Him Once Again"	1981
"It Ain't Me Girl" (with Hot Club)	1983
"I Don't Want You"	1984
"Things Can't Get Any Worse"	1985
"Crown of Thorns"	1990
"It's Better This Way" (Japan only)	1990
"Raindance" (Japan only)	1990
"The Last Emotion" (Medicine Wheel)	1992
