= RAK Studios =

Recording studio in London, England

Coordinates: 51.5342°N 0.1677°W

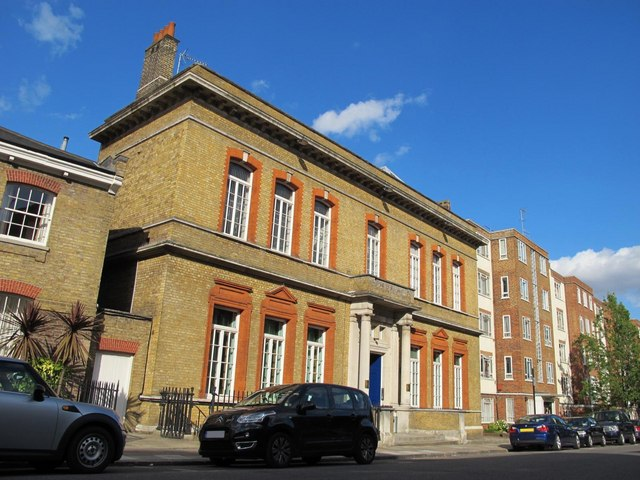
- Type: Private
- Industry: Music
- Founded: 1976; 50 years ago in St John's Wood, London, UK
- Founder: Mickie Most
- Headquarters: 42-48 Charlbert Street, London, England
- Website: rakstudios.co.uk

RAK Studios is a recording studio complex, with residential facilities, used by Rak Records, and located near Regent's Park in central London, England. It was founded in 1976 by the English record producer Mickie Most.

== History ==
The RAK complex resides within a Victorian building that was once a school and church hall before being owned by ATV and used for television program rehearsals before becoming RAK Studios in 1976.

RAK has four recording rooms. Studios 1 and 2 house API mixing consoles; Studio 3 has a vintage Neve VRP Legend console (previously at Abbey Road Studios' Studio 2); and Studio 4 is a 9.1.4 Atmos Room with Genelec system, which also operates a comfortable stereo mix and production room.

== Notable songs recorded at RAK Studios ==
- "In a Big Country" – Big Country
- "Bigmouth Strikes Again" – The Smiths
- "Down in the Tube Station at Midnight" – The Jam
- "Every 1's a Winner" – Hot Chocolate
- "Fairytale of New York" – The Pogues
- "Hold Me Now" – Thompson Twins
- "Kids in America" – Kim Wilde
- "Living Next Door to Alice" – Smokie
- "Pretty in Pink" – The Psychedelic Furs
- "Shattered Dreams" – Johnny Hates Jazz
- "Some Girls" – Racey
- "Vienna" – Ultravox
- "When Love Breaks Down" – Prefab Sprout
- "Always Ascending" – Franz Ferdinand
- "Fake Plastic Trees" – Radiohead

== RAK Mobile ==
The RAK Mobile recording studio was a remote recording truck originally built in 1973 by former BBC engineer Doug Hopkins as the Trans European Audio Mobile, or TEAM. When approached by Mickie Most to rent the TEAM mobile for some long-term projects in France the following year, Hopkins suggested that it may make more sense for Most to buy the truck instead. Most purchased the mobile recording studio and re-branded it the RAK Records Mobile two years prior to establishing RAK Studios.
