= Johnny Hates Jazz =

British group

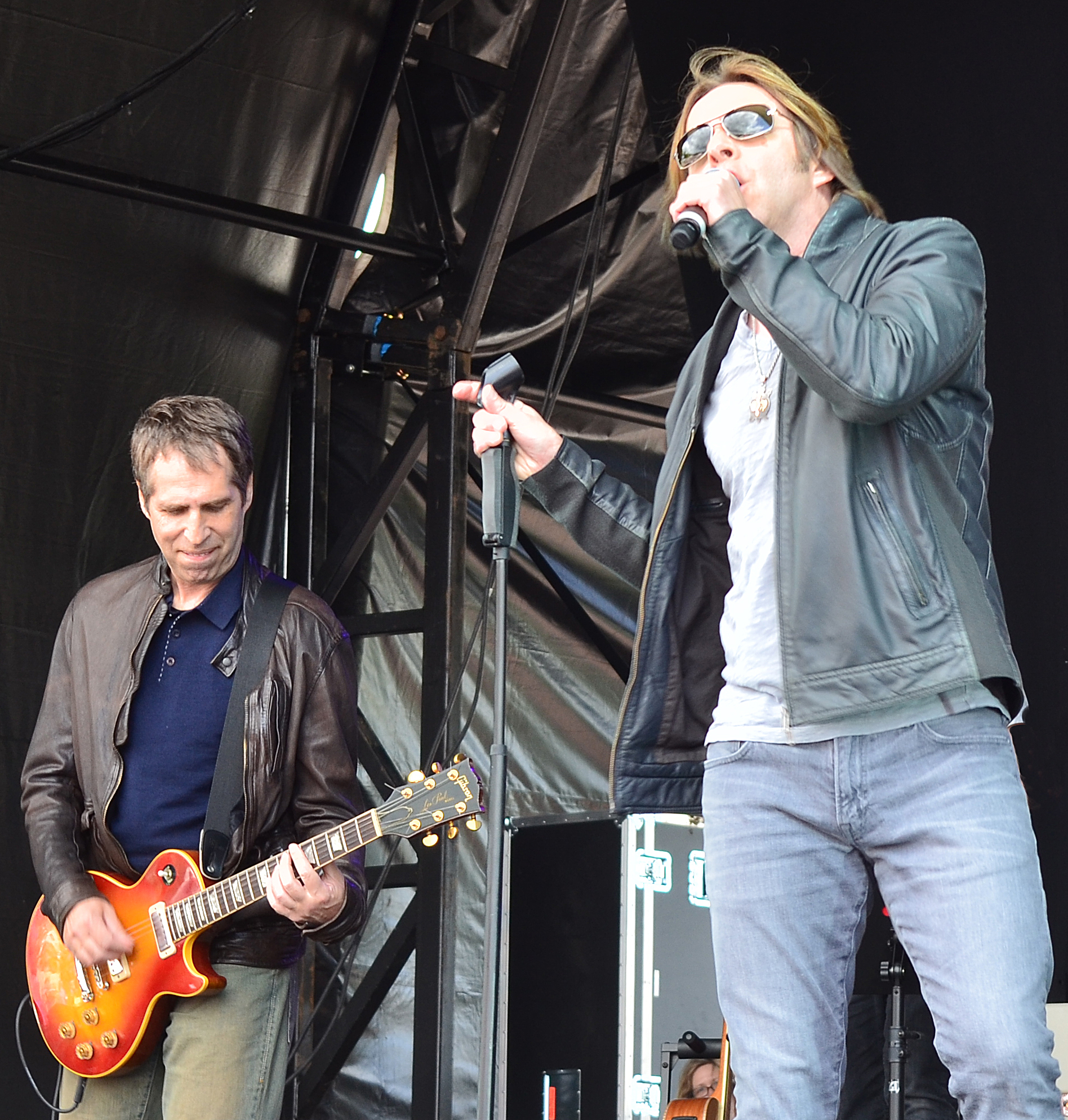
- Johnny Hates Jazz performing in 2014. Mike Nocito (left) and vocalist Clark Datchler (right)

Background information
- Origin: London, England
- Genres: Pop; synth-pop; sophisti-pop
- Years active: 1986–1992; 2009–present
- Labels: RAK; Virgin; InterAction; Dato
- Members: Clark Datchler; Mike Nocito
- Past members: Calvin Hayes (1986–1992, 2009–2010); Phil Thornalley (1988–1992)
- Website: johnnyhatesjazz.com

Johnny Hates Jazz are a British pop band that consists of Clark Datchler (songwriter, vocalist, keyboards) and Mike Nocito (guitarist, bassist, producer, engineer). Formed in 1986 by Datchler, Nocito, and Calvin Hayes (drums, keyboards, producer), Johnny Hates Jazz achieved international success beginning in April 1987 with their second single, "Shattered Dreams", which reached Number 5 in the United Kingdom and Number 2 in the United States. Their self-produced debut 1988 album, Turn Back the Clock, sold four million copies, reached Number 1 on the U.K. album charts, and spawned two more Top 20 singles, "Heart of Gold", and "I Don't Want to Be a Hero".

The band conceived the name "Johnny Hates Jazz" at a party in which Mike Nocito's brother-in-law broke a vinyl record by Dave Brubeck, a famous American jazz pianist. In response to the broken record, the wife of a friend of producer Phil Thornalley remarked, "Johnny Hates Jazz," which became the band's name.

== History ==
=== Early lives and prior careers ===
The three founding members of Johnny Hates Jazz—Clark Datchler, Calvin Hayes, and Mike Nocito—were each born into musical families.

Clark Datchler's father, Fred Datchler, was a member of two chart-topping bands from the 1950s, notably The Stargazers, which had the distinction of being the first British band to reach No. 1 on the UK singles chart. As part of the Polkadots, Fred Datchler sang backing vocals for Frank Sinatra and Petula Clark. Having been a singer, guitarist, and keyboard player in numerous bands as a teenager, Clark Datchler released his first single at the age of 17 on the London independent record label Bluebird Records, backed by members of reggae band Aswad. He went on to work with Rusty Egan of Visage, fusing electronic music with soul, and performed often on the London club scene. He was subsequently signed to Warner Brothers Music as a songwriter, and moved to Los Angeles.

Calvin Hayes was the son of Mickie Most, an English record producer and founder of founder of Rak Records. Most produced the albums of numerous artists in the 1960s and 1970s, including The Animals, Suzi Quatro, and Lulu. Hayes became a keyboardist, drummer, and music producer. Calvin Hayes played drums for English singer Kim Wilde's 1981 touring band after the success of her debut single, "Kids in America".

Mike Nocito hails from an American family based in Europe with the U.S. armed forces. His American mother, a singer in a close-harmony group called the Cactus Kids, performed for U.S. troops in Europe. Nocito was a guitarist in school bands, having grown up alongside friend and fellow record producer Phil Thornalley, as well as members of Katrina and the Waves. He later became a recording engineer at RaK Records and worked with The Police, Duran Duran, and the Thompson Twins.

In the early 1980s, Calvin Hayes and Clark Datchler were members of a band called Hot Club, alongside Glen Matlock, the former original bassist for the Sex Pistols, and .guitarist James Stevenson. In 1983, Hot Club released a single on Rak Records and performed at London's Marquee Club, a performance that impressed Rak head (and Hayes' father), Mickie Most. Most signed Datchler to the label as a solo artist. Most also suggested that Datchler work with Nocito, who was an engineer at RAK Studios at the time. Hot Club later broke up.

=== Original tenure ===
A few years after the breakup of Hot Club, Clark Datchler and Calvin Hayes reunited while both were employees of Rak Records. Datchler was working as a songwriter for the label, while Hayes was employed as an A&R talent scout. There they met Mike Nocito, a Rak Records sound engineer, who had previously worked with Duran Duran and The Police.

Hayes, Datchler, and Nocito formed a band, to be called Johnny Hates Jazz, and released their first single in April 1986, "Me and My Foolish Heart." Hayes, a talent scout, initially told his father, label president Mickie Most, that he had discovered the new band, before revealing the three Rak Records employees had formed Johnny Hates Jazz. The band conceived the name "Johnny Hates Jazz" at a party when Mike Nocito's brother-in-law broke a vinyl record by Dave Brubeck, a famous American jazz pianist. In response to the broken record, the wife of a friend of producer Phil Thornalley remarked, "Johnny Hates Jazz," which became the band's name.

Their debut single, "Me and My Foolish Heart", was a commercial disappointment, but Calvin Hayes arranged a Johnny Hates Jazz performance at the Ronnie Scott's Jazz Club (chosen to match the band's name) for other A&R talent scouts from other record labels. Hayes' show proved successful and Virgin Records recruited and signed Johnny Hates Jazz.

"Shattered Dreams", the band's second single released in March 1987, was slow to gain popularity on the U.K. charts, but became a breakout top 5 hit in the UK, throughout mainland Europe and Asia and reached No. 2 in Japan. Calvin Hayes' father and the band members' boss, Rak Records founder Mickie Most, remarked, after listening to "Shattered Dreams", that he would stand naked in the department store display windows of Selfridges on Oxford Street if "Shattered Dreams" became a hit. Most never fulfilled his promise. "Shattered Dreams" proved even more popular in the United States, where it was released as a commercial and radio single in 1988. The song reached No. 2 on the US Billboard Hot 100, No. 1 on the US Adult Contemporary chart, and climbed to No. 4 in Canada. "Shattered Dreams'" popularity in the United States was accompanied by a new black-and-white music video directed by David Fincher. The video's image proved popular with American audiences, while fans in Asia and Europe compared Johnny Hates Jazz to Steely Dan.

Following the success of "Shattered Dreams", Johnny Hates Jazz quickly began work on their forthcoming debut album, which they largely self-produced themselves. However, at the height of their popularity, singer Clark Datchler announce that he would leave Johnny Hates Jazz while still recording their debut album, citing creative differences between his vision for Johnny Hates Jazz and his bandmates, Hayes and Nocito. Datchler's impending departure, which took place after the album's 1988 release, hurt the band's momentum and overshadowed their new, debut album.

Turn Back the Clock, released in 1988, was a commercial success, selling four million albums and entered the UK Albums Chart at No. 1. It spawned three more worldwide hits, including two Top 20 singles in the United Kingdom, "Heart of Gold" (which also included a music video by David Fincher) and the anti-war song, "I Don't Want to Be a Hero", which reached Number 11. Turn Back the Clock another hit single, featured English singer Kim Wilde on backing vocals. Hayes, who was dating Wilde at the time, recruited her for the song. Johnny Hates Jazz appeared on the BBC One's Top of the Pops eight times in 1987 and 1988.

Datchler left the band to pursue a solo career in late 1988 at the height of Johnny Hates Jazz's popularity.

Hayes and Nocito continued the band and replaced Datchler with their friend, Phil Thornalley, an engineer, record producer, and former touring bass player for the Cure. The new line-up began work on a second follow-up album, Tall Stories, released in 1991. However, Thornalley and Calvin Hayes were involved in a car accident in 1991 just before the album's release, which left Hayes seriously injured. Hayes spent nearly two years in the hospital, including one year in a full body cast, and required longterm rehabilitation treatment. The album, which coincided with the car accident, was commercially unsuccessful and attracted little attention. Johnny Hates Jazz broke up in 1992.

=== After the break-up ===
After leaving Johnny Hates Jazz in 1988, former frontman Clark Datchler moved to Amsterdam at the end of the 1980s and focused on his solo work, recording the albums Raindance and Fishing for Souls. Returning to the UK, he based himself at Peter Gabriel's Real World Studios near Bath throughout the 1990s. In 2000, he moved to the US and created a solar-powered home and studio, where he recorded much of his most recent album, Tomorrow. Throughout this time, he studied the philosophy of indigenous people and became environmentally active. In 2008, he received a GreenTec Award (formerly the Clean Tech Media Awards) in Berlin.

Following the dissolution of Johnny Hates Jazz, Nocito based himself in Cambridge, England, and produced the Katrina and the Waves single "Love Shine a Light", a top 10 hit throughout Europe and winner of the 1997 Eurovision Song Contest. He also produced and wrote for Hepburn, Gina G and Orson, and continued to work extensively with Katrina and the Waves.

Calvin Hayes, who was recovering from his 1991 car accident, largely retreated from the public music industry during the remainder of the 1990s and 2000s.

Phil Thornalley returned to producing and songwriting. He co-wrote Natalie Imbruglia's breakout single, "Torn", which became a major hit in 1997 and 1998.

=== Reunion ===
In 2009, the original, founding members of Johnny Hates Jazz—Datchler, Hayes and Nocito—reunited and reformed Johnny Hates Jazz. Datchler had written a song called "Magnetized", which he felt would be ideal for Johnny Hates Jazz. Soon after, they decided to record a new album. Datchler moved back to the UK and wrote the rest of the songs for the project.

Beginning in 2009, the original line-up of Datchler, Nocito and Hayes performed live at several reunion international concerts in Europe and Southeast Asia.> However, after several live shows, Hayes left the band in 2010 before recording of the new album commenced, citing personal reason and the strains of the touring schedule.

That same year, Datchler received a BMI award for "Shattered Dreams" in recognition of receiving over three million broadcast performances of the song in the US alone.

The subsequent 2013 album, titled Magnetized, marked Johnny Hates Jazz's first new album since 1991. Recording spanned much of 2011 and 2012, and took place at Real World Studios near Bath, Hamp Sound near Cambridge, and Angel Recording Studios in London. It featured Datchler as songwriter, vocalist and keyboard player, and Nocito as producer and engineer. There were also string arrangements and additional keyboards from The Art of Noise's Anne Dudley, who had arranged the strings on "Turn Back The Clock". Other contributors included drummer Alex Reeves, guitarists David Rhodes and Marcus Bonfanti, synthesizer player Pete Watson, and mix engineer Stephen W. Tayler.

The first single, "Magnetized", was released in the UK on 28 April 2013, and received widespread airplay, being A-listed for several weeks on BBC Radio 2. It was also released in Germany and achieved similar success on radio there. The album was subsequently released on 5 May in the UK. However, Datchler collapsed in London shortly after this, and was diagnosed with a rare form of cancer. As a result, all promotion came to halt. It was not until the following year that he made a full recovery, but by that time the album had lost momentum, and the band decided to focus on live work instead.

After this, the band performed extensively in the UK at festivals, as well as in Germany and Asia. In 2017, they released a remixed version of "Magnetized" in China, as well as performing live. Subsequently, they began writing and recording material for a new album. In addition, Datchler co-wrote 11 songs with Mike Rutherford for the UK top 10 Mike + the Mechanics albums Let Me Fly and Out of the Blue.

The band released a new single, titled "Spirit of Love", on 29 May 2020. It features inspirations and musical roots from the 1970s during which Datchler and Nocito grew up. Also on 29 May 2020, it was announced in a trailer that a new album, Wide Awake, would be released on 14 August 2020. This was said to have been "two years in the making", and to contain "... a mixture of soulful melodies, uplifting lyrics, and a positive energy that is present from start to finish." On 4 June 2020, a music video was released that featured fan pictures and videos of what they loved most and the band members walking around and visiting different spots in Japan.

In October 2021, the band toured the UK, supporting Level 42.

Calvin Hayes died on 9 July 2026, aged 63, after collapsing at his home in Spokane, Washington, in the United States.

== Band members ==
Current members

- Clark Datchler – vocals, keyboards, guitar (1986–1988; 2009–present)
- Mike Nocito – bass, guitar, synthesizers, backing vocals (1986–1992, 2009–present)

Former members

- Calvin Hayes – keyboards, drums, bass, backing vocals (1986–1992, 2009–2010; died 2026)
- Phil Thornalley – vocals, instruments (1988–1992)

Session/touring musicians

- Marcus Bonfanti – guitar, backing vocals (2011–2024)
- Alex Reeves – drums (2011–present)
- Berenice Scott – keyboards, backing vocals (2011–c. 2018)
- Rosa Ullmann – keyboards, backing vocals (c. 2018–2024)
- Dan Western – drums (fill-in 2019–2024)
- Nic Keeble – guitar, backing vocals (2024–present)
- Georgette Fawley – keyboards, backing vocals (2024–present)
- Jack Grange – drums (fill-in 2024)

== Discography ==
=== Studio albums ===
Title	Details	Peak chart positions										Certifications
Title	Details	UK	UK Sales	UK Indie	AUT	GER	NLD	NOR	NZ	SWE	SWI	Certifications
Turn Back the Clock	Released: 11 January 1988; Label: Virgin; Formats: CD, LP, cassette	1	1	—	20	5	3	1	3	1	4	BPI: 2× Platinum
Tall Stories	Released: June 1991; Label: Virgin; Formats: CD, LP, cassette	—	—	—	—	—	—	—	—	—	—	
Magnetized	Released: 24 May 2013; Label: InterAction Music; Formats: CD, digital download	102	102	23	—	—	—	—	—	—	—	
Wide Awake	Released: 14 August 2020; Label: Absolute Label Services; Formats: CD, digital download	—	92	31	—	—	—	—	—	—	—	
"—" denotes a recording that did not chart or was not released in that territory.

=== Compilation albums ===
- The Very Best of Johnny Hates Jazz (Disky Records, 1993)
- Best of the '80s (Disky Records, 2000)

=== Singles ===
Title	Year	Peak chart positions										Certifications	Album
Title	Year	UK	UK Network	AUS	BEL (FL)	GER	IRE	NLD	NZ	SWE	US	Certifications	Album
"Me and My Foolish Heart"	1986	112	112	—	—	—	—	—	—	—	—		Turn Back the Clock
"Shattered Dreams"	1987	5	3	22	36	7	3	26	—	7	2	BPI: Silver	Turn Back the Clock
"I Don't Want to Be a Hero"	1987	11	11	76	16	17	13	25	—	10	31		Turn Back the Clock
"Turn Back the Clock"	1987	12	14	—	9	19	17	6	3	20	—		Turn Back the Clock
"Heart of Gold"	1988	19	18	87	30	55	19	27	18	—	—		Turn Back the Clock
"Don't Say It's Love"	1988	48	40	—	—	—	—	—	—	—	—		Turn Back the Clock
"Turn the Tide"	1989	84	—	—	—	—	—	—	—	—	—		Non-album single
"Let Me Change Your Mind Tonight"	1991	101	101	—	—	—	—	—	—	—	—		Tall Stories
"The Last to Know"	1991	78	—	—	—	57	—	—	—	—	—		Tall Stories
"Magnetized"	2013	—	—	—	—	—	—	—	—	—	—		Magnetized
"Spirit of Love"	2020	—	—	—	—	—	—	—	—	—	—		Wide Awake
"New Day Ahead"	2020	—	—	—	—	—	—	—	—	—	—		Wide Awake
"Greater Good"	2020	—	—	—	—	—	—	—	—	—	—		Wide Awake
"—" denotes a recording that did not chart or was not released in that territory.
