= Mike Nocito =

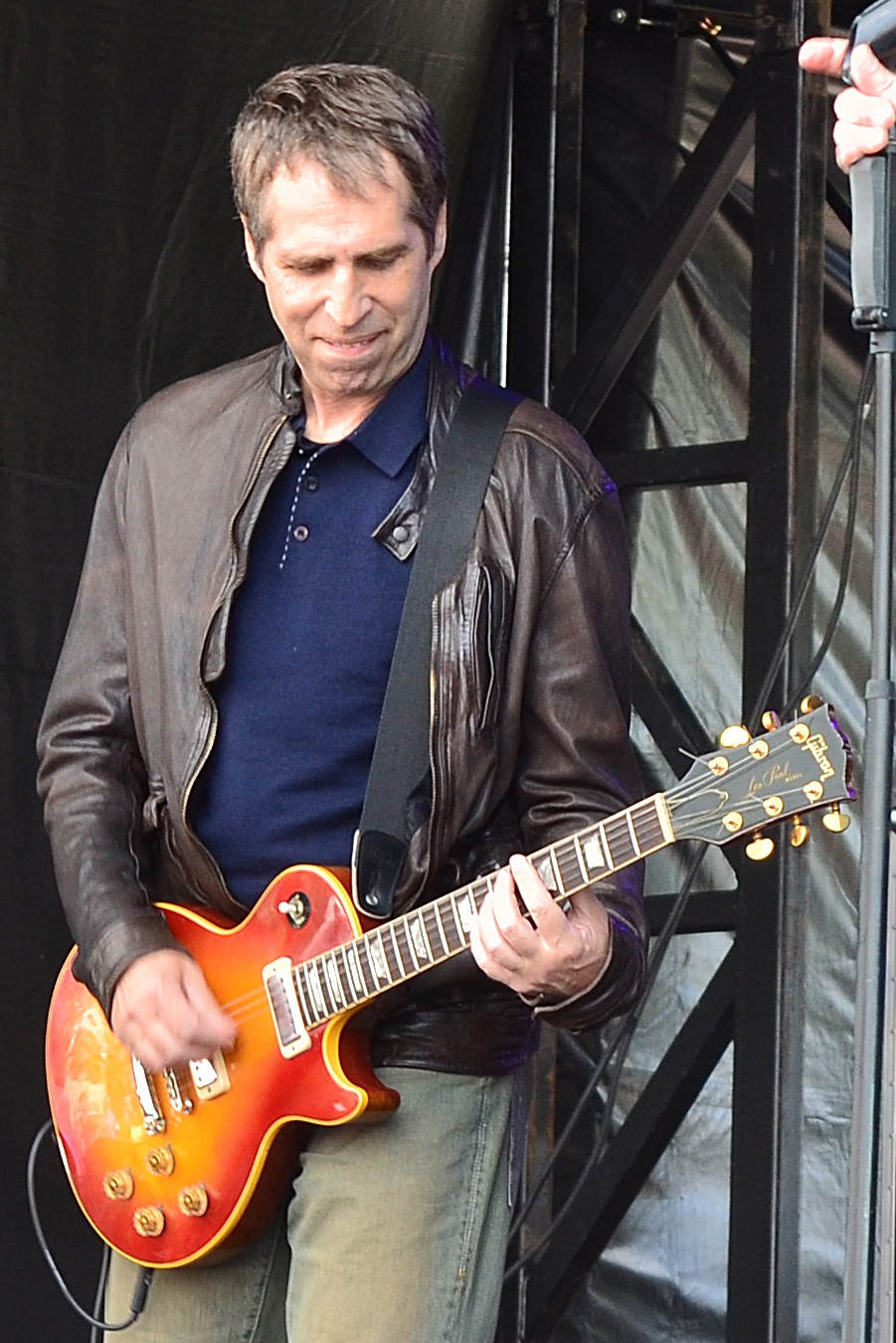
- Mike Nocito performing with Johnny Hates Jazz at Let's Rock Bristol in 2014.
- Born: August 5, 1963; Wiesbaden, Hesse, West Germany
- Occupations: Musician, Music Producer
- Musical career
- Genres: Rock, Pop rock
- Instruments: bassist; guitarist; sound engineer; music producer
- Member of: Johnny Hates Jazz (1986–1992, since 2009)

Mike Nocito (born August 5, 1963 Wiesbaden, West Germany) is an American musician, bassist, sound engineer, and music producer. In 1986, Nocito formed the British synth-pop band Johnny Hates Jazz, best known for the "Shattered Dreams". with vocalist Clark Datchler and keyboardist Calvin Hayes. Nocito produced many of the band's songs and remained with the band until its breakup in 1992. Nocito reunited Johnny Hates Jazz in 2009 with its original lineup and remains a member of the band, as of 2026.

Outside of his work with Johnny Hates Jazz, Nocito co-wrote and produced "Love Shine a Light" by the British rock band Katrina and the Waves, which won the Eurovision Song Contest in 1997.

== Biography ==
Nocito was born in Wiesbaden, West Germany, to an American military family. His American mother was a singer who toured Europe to entertain American armed forces.

By the 1980s, Nocito was employed as a sound engineer at Rak Records in London. He worked with several well-known artists, including Duran Duran and The Police. Nocito met two other RaK Records employees: Clark Datchler, who was working as a label songwriter, and Calvin Hayes, a A&R talent scout and son of RaK Records founder Mickie Most. Together, the trio formed the British pop band Johnny Hates Jazz in 1986. Nocito produced most of the bands songs, including hits from their 1988 debut album, Turn Back the Clock, which was largely self-produced and sold four million copies. He remained with the band until its breakup in 1992.

Following the dissolution of Johnny Hates Jazz, Nocito based himself in Cambridge, England, and produced the Katrina and the Waves single "Love Shine a Light", a top 10 hit throughout Europe and winner of the 1997 Eurovision Song Contest.

In 2009, Nocito reunited Johnny Hates Jazz with original members Calvin Hayes and Clark Datchler.
