= Bob Kraushaar =

Bob Kraushaar is an English pop music record producer specializing in mixing. Educated at Bancroft's School, Woodford Green, Kraushaar has mixed and produced commercially successful songs and albums for numerous British and international artists. His first industry appointment was as a runner for Trevor Horn. He graduated to tape-operating at Marcus Studios but moved back to the SARM Studios when they expanded and equipped with SSLs. His first chart success came with Johnny Hates Jazz, and he was soon known as a mixing specialist having made his mark with ZTT artists such as Propaganda and Art of Noise. SARM's associated ZTT label was outputting multiple 12-inch singles requiring alternative versions, and many of these were mixed by Kraushaar. He went on to work with Paul McCartney, ABC, the Human League, Erasure, and perhaps his most regular client, Pet Shop Boys. 1985 saw Kraushaar mixing "Intermission (The Gods are Bored)", a track on Anne Pigalle's album Everything Could Be So Perfect.

His first UK No. 1 chart credit for production, recording, and mixing was with Marc Almond and Gene Pitney's duet, "Something's Gotten Hold of My Heart" for Parlophone/Some Bizzare in 1989.

Although best known for his work in pop, Kraushaar's credits also include several harder-edged artists such as Public Image Limited (Happy?), Gang of Four (mixing on Mall and Shrinkwrapped), Apoptygma Berzerk and the Fatima Mansions.

As well as mixing an album for Mediaeval Baebes, Kraushaar has mixed a Liberty X single (featuring Run DMC) and tracks for Erasure's Andy Bell, the Cinematics (with Stephen Hague), Onetwo, and Another Language.

As NorthxNWest, a collaboration with Chuck Norman, Kraushaar's remixes and productions are featured on Shirley Bassey's album Get the Party Started. The single "Get the Party Started" was produced by Catherine Feeney, Nikki Lamborn, Kraushaar, and Chuck Norman.

In 2008, Kraushaar achieved further chart success by mixing the Cologne-based dance trio Blank & Jones, who entered the official German sales charts at No. 42 with their album The Logic of Pleasure.

Kraushaar also worked on tracks for Apoptygma Berzerk's Rocket Science. In 2010, Kraushaar mixed Kim Wilde's Come Out and Play.

A UK release in February 2011 by Claudia Brücken had six of the tracks engineered and mixed by Kraushaar.

In 2011, Kraushaar was again in the studio with the Pet Shop Boys, mixing the score of the ballet The Most Incredible Thing.
