= Mickie Most =

English record producer and musician (1938–2003)

Background information
- Born: Michael Peter Hayes; 20 June 1938; Aldershot, Hampshire, England
- Died: 30 May 2003 (aged 64) London, England
- Genres: Pop; rock
- Occupations: Record producer; musician
- Instrument: Vocals
- Years active: 1958–2003
- Labels: Decca; RAK

Mickie Most (born Michael Peter Hayes; 20 June 1938 – 30 May 2003) was an English record producer behind acts such as the Animals, Herman's Hermits, the Nashville Teens, Donovan, Lulu, Suzi Quatro, Hot Chocolate, Arrows, Racey and the Jeff Beck Group, often issued on his own RAK Records label.

== Biography ==
=== Early career ===
Most was born as Michael Peter Hayes in Aldershot, Hampshire, England. The son of a regimental sergeant-major, he moved with his parents to Harrow, Middlesex in 1951. He was influenced by skiffle and early rock and roll in his youth. Leaving school at 15, he worked as a singing waiter at London's The 2i's Coffee Bar where he made friends with future business partner Peter Grant, and formed a singing duo with Alex Wharton (aka Alex Murray) who billed themselves as the Most Brothers. They recorded the single "Takes A Whole Lotta Loving to Keep My Baby Happy" with Decca Records before disbanding. Wharton later went on to produce the Moody Blues single "Go Now".

After changing his name to Mickie Most in 1959, he travelled to South Africa with his wife Christina, and formed a pop group, Mickie Most and His Playboys. The band had eleven consecutive No. 1 singles there, mostly with cover versions of Ray Peterson, Gene Vincent, Buddy Holly and Eddie Cochran songs. Returning to London in 1962, Most appeared on package tours as well as recording "Mister Porter", a No. 45 hit in the UK Singles Chart in July 1963 and had moderate success with "The Feminine Look" in 1963, this single featuring Jimmy Page on lead guitar and heralding early British heavy rock.

Most and his wife, Christina, had three children, including musician Calvin Hayes (1962-2026), who later founded the 1980s pop band, Johnny Hates Jazz.>

=== Producer ===
Becoming tired of touring clubs, Most decided to concentrate on other aspects of the music industry. His first job was selling records in stores and displaying them on racks (later inspiration for his record label, RAK) before finding a niche with production for Columbia Records. After spotting The Animals at Newcastle's Club A-Go-Go, he offered to produce their first single, "Baby Let Me Take You Home", which reached No. 21 in the UK Singles Chart. Their follow-up 1964 single, "The House of the Rising Sun", became an international hit.

Most had success with Herman's Hermits after being approached by their manager Harvey Lisberg at Derek Everett's suggestion. Their first Most production, "I'm into Something Good", went to No. 1 in September 1964, beginning a run of single and album sales (ten million over 12 months), the group for a time challenging The Beatles in popularity in the United States. His down-to-earth handling of the band, his business acumen and knack for selecting hit singles, established Most as one of the most successful producers in Britain and kept him in demand throughout the 1960s and 1970s.

In July 1964, Most had another top 10 hit with the Nashville Teens' remake of the John D. Loudermilk song "Tobacco Road". In September 1964, with Most at the control board, Brenda Lee recorded "Is It True" and "What'd I Say". "Is It True" was released in Britain and later in the US, and it became a hit and a gold record. "What'd I Say" became another hit throughout Europe but was never released in the US. Most had equal success with other artists for whom he produced chart-topping albums and singles between 1964 and 1969, notably Donovan with "Sunshine Superman", "Mellow Yellow", "Jennifer Juniper", and Lulu's hits "To Sir, with Love", "The Boat That I Row", "Boom Bang-a-Bang" (which finished equal first in the 1969 Eurovision Song Contest), "Me the Peaceful Heart", and "I'm a Tiger". Most also produced the final studio single of the 1960s by The Seekers, "Days of My Life", in 1968, and Nancy Sinatra's "The Highway Song" in 1969. Additionally in the 1960s, Most signed and produced artists such as singer-guitarist Terry Reid, and all-girl rock band The She Trinity.

Most's productions were backed by London-based session musicians including Big Jim Sullivan and Jimmy Page on guitar, John Paul Jones on bass guitar and arrangements, Nicky Hopkins on piano, and Bobby Graham on drums. He produced Jeff Beck's hits "Love is Blue" and "Hi Ho Silver Lining" and the Jeff Beck Group albums Truth and Beck-Ola. By 1967, after commercial and critical failure of The Yardbirds album Little Games, he decided to steer clear of rock groups. The Yardbirds objected to his insistence that every song be cut to three minutes and that albums were an afterthought following the singles. His focused approach also led to a split with Donovan in late 1969. Most and Donovan reunited in 1973 for the album Cosmic Wheels on which Most was credited under his real name, Michael Peter Hayes.

=== From 1968 to 1983 ===
Despite these setbacks, Most set up his own production office at 155 Oxford Street, sharing it with his business partner Peter Grant. It was through Most's association that Grant was asked to manage The Yardbirds. In 1968, Most and Grant set up RAK Management, but Grant's involvement with The New Yardbirds, which soon evolved into Led Zeppelin, meant Most had control in late 1969. RAK Records and RAK Music Publishing were launched in 1969. RAK Music Publishing has the copyright of popular songs such as "You Sexy Thing" composed by Hot Chocolate singer Errol Brown and a half interest in the song "I Love Rock 'n' Roll" written by Alan Merrill and Jake Hooker of the band Arrows.

With RAK Records, Most's success continued with folk singer Julie Felix's charting cover of Simon & Garfunkel's "El Condor Pasa". Felix was the first artist signed to the label. Most then produced Mary Hopkin's 1970 hit "Temma Harbour" for Apple Records, followed by her Eurovision Song Contest entry, "Knock, Knock Who's There?". In 1970, Most approached Suzi Quatro for a recording contract after seeing her on stage at a Detroit dance hall with the band Cradle (which also had Quatro's sisters Arlene, Patti, and Nancy as members), while on a production assignment in Chicago. Quatro was among a growing roster of artists signed to RAK Records which included Alexis Korner's CCS, Arrows, Smokie (with Chris Norman) (originally spelt Smokey), Hot Chocolate, Angie Miller, Chris Spedding, and Heavy Metal Kids. Hiring the songwriting production team of Nicky Chinn and Mike Chapman, RAK scored several British number 1 singles with Suzi Quatro ("Can the Can" and "Devil Gate Drive") and Mud ("Tiger Feet", "Lonely This Christmas" and "Oh Boy").

For RAK in the 1970s, Most also produced hits for New World, Duncan Browne, Cozy Powell, Tam White and Racey, as well as Chris Spedding's self-titled 1976 album, which was Spedding's fifth solo record. He also produced "We Vibrate", the first 45 by punk band The Vibrators. In 1980, Most discovered Kim Wilde, who was doing backing vocals for her brother Ricky Wilde at a Luton recording session. After hearing her, Most signed Wilde who immediately scored a hit with the single "Kids in America" which reached number 2 in the UK, and number 25 on the US Billboard chart. In the 1980s, the band Johnny Hates Jazz, which included Most's son Calvin Hayes, was also signed to RAK Records.

In the 1970s, Most was a panellist on the ITV talent show New Faces and, along with fellow record producer Tony Hatch, became known for his harsh comments on the acts performing on the show. He was a producer of Revolver, a TV programme devoted to punk rock which was at odds with his 'studio factory' approach to pop music.

=== Later career ===
RAK was sold to EMI in 1983 but was revived in 1988. Most was one of the first producers to own the rights to his own records and RAK Studios, which opened in 1976 in St John's Wood, remains active.

He was the subject of This Is Your Life in 1981 when he was surprised by Eamonn Andrews at BBC Broadcasting House in London.

In 1995, Most's fortune was estimated at £50 million and he appeared in The Sunday Times annual Rich List among the Top 500 in England. His house, Montebello, in Totteridge Lane, London, was claimed to be the largest private home in the UK, worth an estimated £4 million. His production work diminished after he was diagnosed with cancer in 2000.

=== Death ===
On 30 May 2003, Most, 64, died at home possibly from peritoneal mesothelioma, a complication of asbestosis. Investigative journalist Paul Foot thought Most's cancer could have resulted from ingesting fibres from asbestos-impregnated vinyl tiles, intended to improve soundproofing in recording studios. A blue plaque commemorating his life was donated by the Heritage Foundation/Musical Heritage, and unveiled at RAK Studios on 16 May 2004. The lunch and auction that followed raised £40,000 for mesothelioma research.

== Discography ==
=== Compilation albums ===
- Best of Mickie Most and His Playboys (1994)
- Lulu – To Sir with Love: The Complete Mickie Most Recordings (2005), EMI
