= Rak Records =

British record label

- Parent company: EMI, PRT Records (1987–1988), Gearbox Music (2014–present)
- Founded: 1969
- Founder: Mickie Most
- Status: Active
- Distributors: Gearbox Music (2014–present catalogue); Parlophone Records (back catalogue); Chrysalis Records/Blue Raincoat Music (Suzi Quatro catalogue)
- Genre: Rock, pop
- Country of origin: United Kingdom
- Location: London, England

Rak Records is a British record label, founded by record producer Mickie Most in 1969. Rak was home to artists such as Herman's Hermits, Suzi Quatro, Mud, Kenny, Hot Chocolate, Smokie, Arrows, Span, Racey and Kim Wilde. Rak Records were distributed via a licensing deal with EMI Records, which bought the company and its master recordings from Most in 1983. Most kept the company name and his RAK Studios, which still exists in St. John's Wood along with Rak Publishing. The latter company represents artists such as Joan Jett, Ben Taylor and KK. In 1986, Most defected the label from EMI to PRT Records which handled the last releases until February 1988. Owing to the records not being hits, the label folded. However, 26 years later in late 2014, Rak Records was revived as a label for new artists releasing both downloads and 7-inch vinyl in the form of a singles club. The Cadbury Sisters, Trojanhorse, and Beautiful Boy were the new signings. They recorded their own original songs as the A-sides, and covered a classic Rak artists cover as the B-side. The Cadbury Sisters covered Steve Harley's 1975 classic "Make Me Smile (Come Up And See Me)" (even though it was originally released on the generic EMI label), Trojan Horse did Cozy Powell's "Dance With The Devil", and Beautiful Boy did "Kids In America". As PRT Records no longer exists, the label is now distributed by Gearbox Records using the original sailing yacht paper label and the records packaged in the original royal blue paper sleeves.

When Warner Music Group acquired Parlophone from EMI in 2013, this included the rights to Hot Chocolate and other artists. However, Suzi Quatro's albums on Rak are owned by currently independent label Chrysalis Records after Blue Raincoat Music acquired that label in May 2016 from Warner.

== Rak Publishing ==
Rak Publishing is currently in London, in the original RAK Studios complex in St John's Wood. They manage the publishing rights for songs like "You Sexy Thing" by Hot Chocolate, "I Love Rock 'n' Roll" by Arrows, covered by Joan Jett and Britney Spears, and "Kids In America" recorded by Kim Wilde. Rak Publishing and Tummy Touch Records are currently releasing new and archive material from the Rak catalogue.

== See also ==
- List of records by RAK Records
- Category:Rak Records artists
- Category:Rak Records albums
- Category:Albums recorded at RAK Studios
