= List of UK top-ten singles in 1980 =

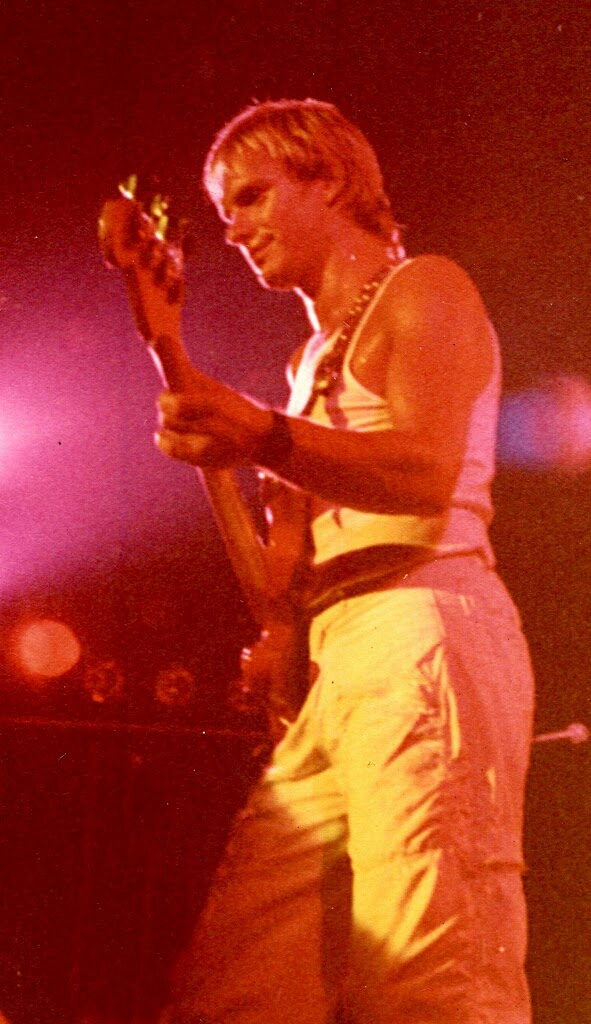
Sting and his band The Police achieved the best-selling single of 1980 with "Don't Stand So Close to Me", which spent four weeks at number-one. The group had a total of four top 10 entries this year.

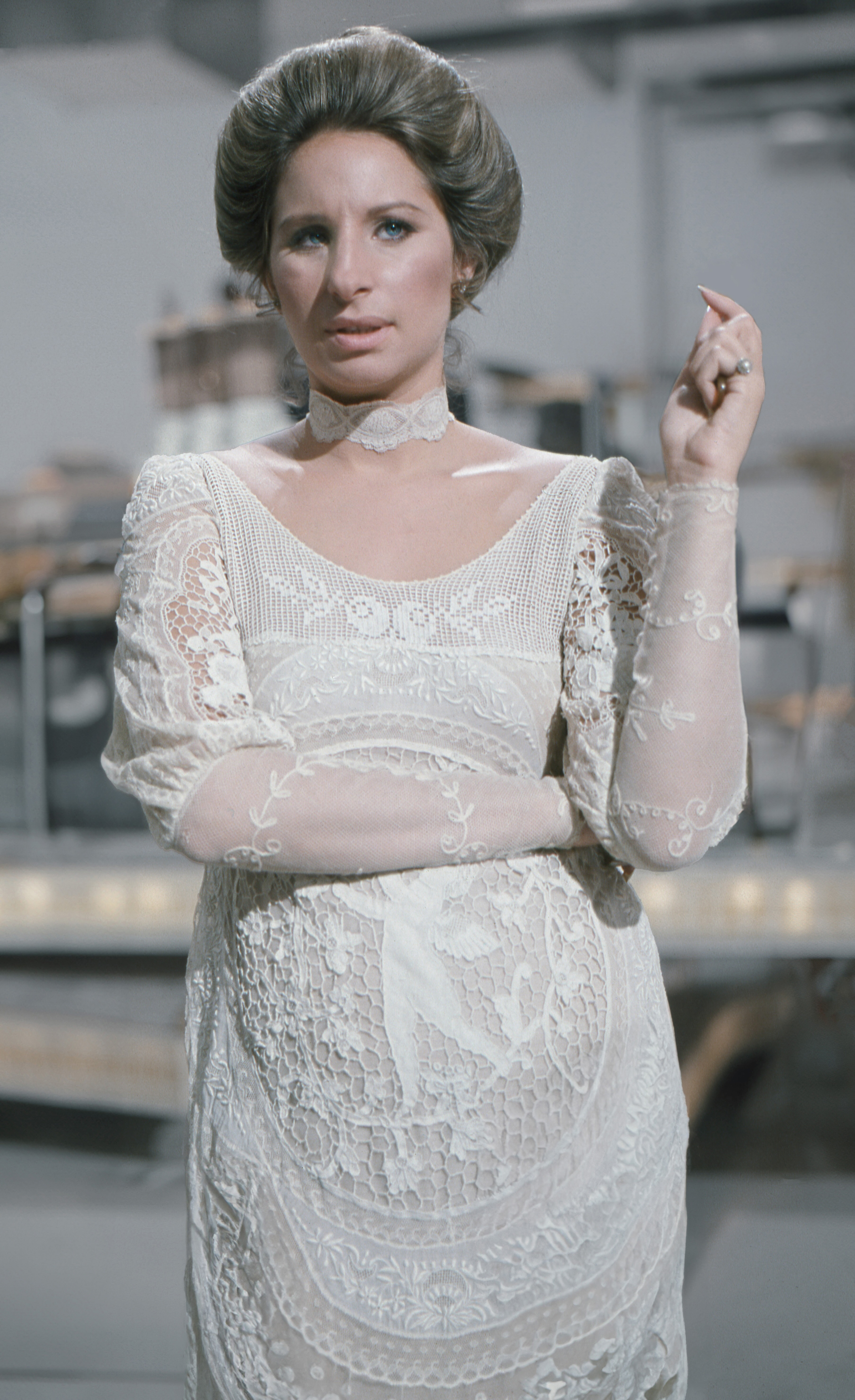
Barbra Streisand secured her only UK number-one single in October this year with "Woman in Love", which became the year's second best selling single.

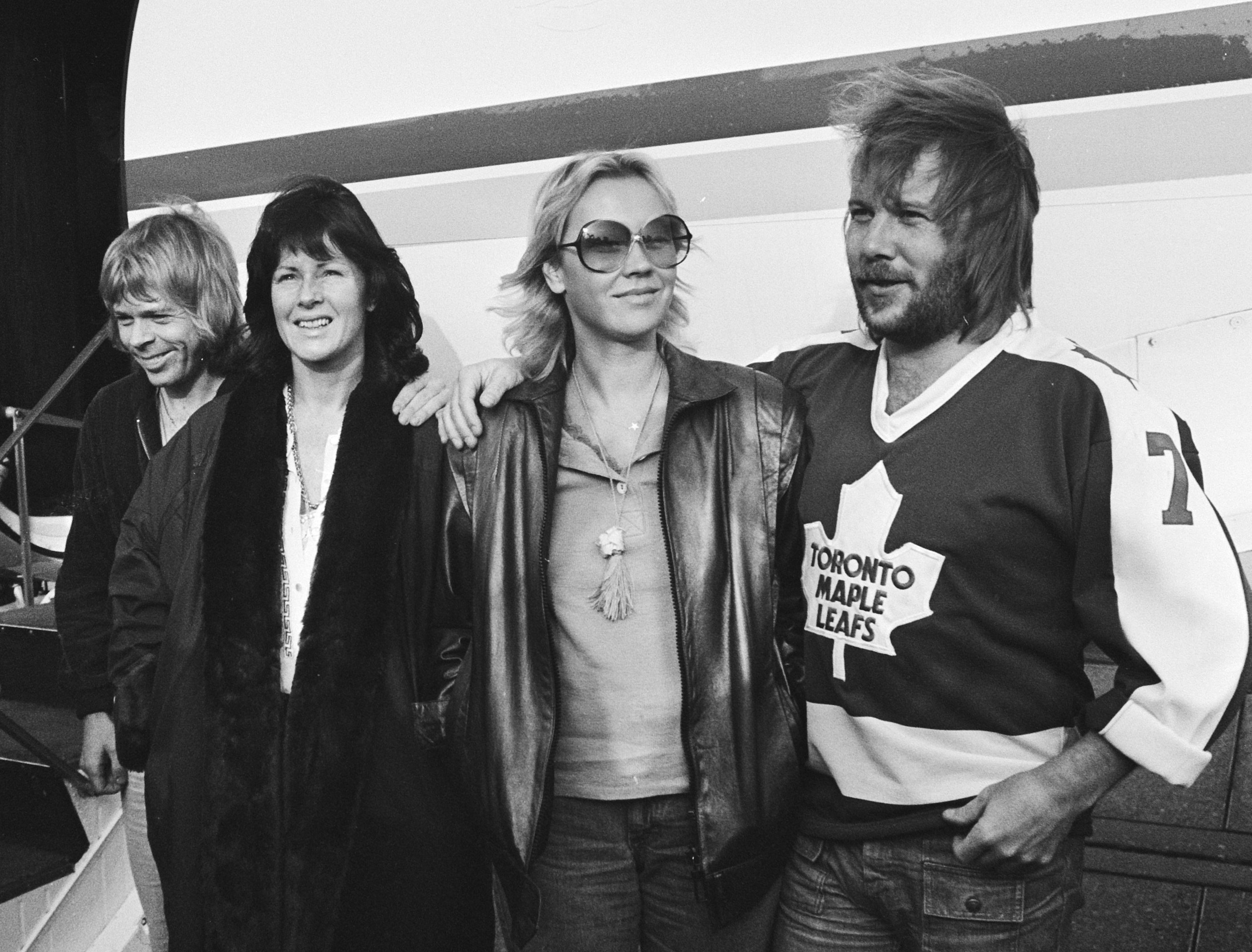
ABBA earned three top 10 singles in 1980, including the number-one hits "The Winner Takes it All" and "Super Trouper", with the latter becoming the fourth best selling single of the year.

The UK Singles Chart is one of many music charts compiled by the Official Charts Company that calculates the best-selling singles of the week in the United Kingdom. Before 2004, the chart was only based on the sales of physical singles. This list shows singles that peaked in the Top 10 of the UK Singles Chart during 1980, as well as singles which peaked in 1979 and 1981 but were in the top 10 in 1980. The entry date is when the single appeared in the top 10 for the first time (week ending, as published by the Official Charts Company, which is six days after the chart is announced).

One-hundred and forty-seven singles were in the top ten in 1980. Ten singles from 1979 remained in the top 10 for several weeks at the beginning of the year, while "Antmusic" by Adam and the Ants, "Imagine" by John Lennon and "Happy Xmas (War is Over)" by John Lennon, Yoko Ono, the Plastic Ono Band with the Harlem Community Center Choir were all released in 1980 but did not reach their peak until 1981. "Day Trip to Bangor (Didn't We Have a Lovely Time)" by Fiddler's Dram, "Wonderful Christmastime" by Paul McCartney and "Brass in Pocket" by The Pretenders were the singles from 1979 to reach their peak in 1980. Twenty-eight artists scored multiple entries in the top 10 in 1980. Adam and the Ants, Dexys Midnight Runners, Sheena Easton, Spandau Ballet and UB40 were among the many artists who achieved their first UK charting top 10 single in 1980.

The 1979 Christmas number-one, "Another Brick in the Wall (Part 2)" by Pink Floyd, remained at number-one for the first two weeks of 1980. The first new number-one single of the year was "Brass in Pocket" by The Pretenders. Overall, twenty-five different singles peaked at number-one in 1980, with Blondie, The Jam and ABBA (2) having the joint most singles hit that position.

== Background ==
=== Multiple entries ===
One-hundred and forty-seven singles charted in the top 10 in 1980, with one-hundred and thirty-seven singles reaching their peak this year.

Twenty-eight artists scored multiple entries in the top 10 in 1980. Madness and The Police shared the record for most top 10 hits in 1980 with four hit singles each. Seven artists recorded three singles which reached the top 10 this year: ABBA, The Beat, Blondie, John Lennon, Paul McCartney, The Specials and UB40.

David Bowie was one of a number of artists with two top 10 entries, including the number-one single "Ashes to Ashes". Adam and the Ants, Cliff Richard, The Jam, Michael Jackson and Roxy Music were among the other artists who had multiple top 10 entries in 1980.

=== Chart debuts ===
Fifty-six artists achieved their first top 10 single in 1980, either as a lead or featured artist. Of these, six went on to record another hit single that year: Adam and the Ants, Dexys Midnight Runners, George Benson, Liquid Gold, The Nolans and Sheena Easton. The Beat and UB40 both had two other entries in their breakthrough year.

The following table (collapsed on desktop site) does not include acts who had previously charted as part of a group and secured their first top 10 solo single.

Artist	Number of top 10s	First entry	Chart position	Other entries
The Beat	3	"Tears of a Clown"/"Ranking Full Stop"	6	"Hands Off...She's Mine" (9), "Mirror in the Bathroom" (4)
Syreeta	1	"With You I'm Born Again"	2	—
The Nolans	2	"I'm in the Mood for Dancing"	3	"Gotta Pull Myself Together" (9)
Styx	1	"Babe"	6	—
Joe Jackson	1	"It's Different for Girls"	5	—
Keith Michell	1	"Captain Beaky"/"Wilfred the Weasel"	5	—
Jon and Vangelis	1	"I Hear You Now"	8	—
The Whispers	1	"And the Beat Goes On"	2	—
Ramones	1	"Baby, I Love You"	8	—
Marti Webb	1	"Take That Look Off Your Face"	3	—
Fern Kinney	1	"Together We Are Beautiful"	1	—
Captain & Tennille	1	"Do That to Me One More Time"	7	—
The Vapors	1	"Turning Japanese"	3	—
Liquid Gold	2	"Dance Yourself Dizzy"	2	"Substitute" (8)
Martha and the Muffins	1	"Echo Beach"	10	—
The Brothers Johnson	1	"Stomp!"	6	—
The Lambrettas	1	"Poison Ivy"	7	—
UB40	3	"King"/"Food for Thought"	4	"My Way of Thinking"/"I Think It's Going to Rain" (6), "The Earth Dies Screaming"/"Dream a Lie" (10)
Dexys Midnight Runners	2	"Geno"	1	"There, There, My Dear" (7)
Sky	1	"Toccata"	5	—
Bobby Thurston	1	"Check Out the Groove"	10	—
Johnny Logan	1	"What's Another Year"	1	—
Rodney Franklin	1	"The Groove"	7	—
Motörhead	1	"The Golden Years (EP)"	8	—
The Undertones	1	"My Perfect Cousin"	9	—
Narada Michael Walden	1	"I Shoulda Loved Ya"	8	—
The Mash	1	"Theme from M*A*S*H (Suicide is Painless)"	1	—
Lipps Inc.	1	"Funkytown"	2	—
Donny Hathaway	1	"Back Together Again"	3	—
Crown Heights Affair	1	"You Gave Me Love"	10	—
The Korgis	1	"Everybody's Got to Learn Sometime"	5	—
Teena Marie	1	"Behind the Groove"	6	—
Splodgenessabounds	1	"Simon Templer"/"Two Pints of Lager and a Packet of Crisps Please"	7	—
Stacy Lattisaw	1	"Jump to the Beat"	3	—
Sheena Easton	2	"9 to 5"	3	"Modern Girl" (8)
The Gap Band	1	"Oops Upside Your Head"	6	—
George Benson	2	"Give Me the Night"	7	"Love X Love" (10)
Tom Browne	1	"Funkin' for Jamaica (N.Y.)"	10	—
Kelly Marie	1	"Feels Like I'm in Love"	1	—
The Piranhas	1	"Tom Hark"	6	—
Hazel O'Connor	1	"Eighth Day"	5	—
Randy Crawford	1	"One Day I'll Fly Away"	2	—
Ottawan	1	"D.I.S.C.O."	2	—
Black Slate	1	"Amigo"	9	—
Sweet People	1	"Et Les Oiseaux Chantaient (And the Birds Were Singing)"	4	—
Matchbox	1	"When You Ask About Love"	4	—
Bad Manners	1	"Special Brew"	3	—
Orchestral Manoeuvres in the Dark	1	"Enola Gay"	8	—
Adam and the Ants	2	"Dog Eat Dog"	4	"Antmusic" (2) ^{[A]}
Dennis Waterman	1	"I Could Be So Good for You"	3	—
Stephanie Mills	1	"Never Knew Love Like This Before"	4	—
Spandau Ballet	1	"To Cut a Long Story Short"	5	—
Eddy Grant	1	"Do You Feel My Love"	8	—
St Winifred's School Choir	1	"There's No One Quite Like Grandma"	1	—
Jona Lewie	1	"Stop the Cavalry"	3	—
Stray Cats	1	"Runaway Boys"	9	—

Notes

Peter Gabriel made his first top 10 appearance this year since his departure from Genesis. His debut solo single "Solsbury Hill" missed the top 10 in 1979, but he took "Games Without Frontiers" to number 4.

Jermaine Jackson achieved six previous top 10 hits as part of the Jackson 5, but "Let's Get Serious" was his first top 10 appearance as a solo artist.

Actor Mike Berry scored a top 10 hit - "Don't You Think It's Time" (6) - with his backing group The Outlaws in 1963. "The Sunshine of Your Smile" was his first and only independent top 10 hit.

=== Songs from films ===
Original songs from various films entered the top 10 throughout the year. These included "With You I'm Born Again" (from Fast Break), "Call Me" (American Gigolo), "Theme from M*A*S*H* (Suicide Is Painless)" (MASH) and "Xanadu" (Xanadu).

=== Best-selling singles ===
The Police had the best-selling single of the year with "Don't Stand So Close to Me". The single spent six weeks in the top 10 (including four weeks at number one) and was certified gold by the BPI. "Woman in Love" by Barbra Streisand came in second place. Kelly Marie's "Feels Like I'm in Love", "Super Trouper" from ABBA and "D.I.S.C.O." by Ottawan made up the top five. Singles by Blondie, Dexys Midnight Runners, Fern Kinney, Kenny Rogers and The Detroit Spinners were also in the top ten best-selling singles of the year.

== Top-ten singles ==
Key

Symbol	Meaning
‡	Single peaked in 1979 but still in charted in 1980.
♦	Single released in 1980 but peaked in 1981.
(#)	Year-end top-ten single position and rank
Entered	The date that the single first appeared in the chart.
Peak	Highest position that the single reached in the UK Singles Chart.

Entered (week ending)	Weeks in top 10	Single	Artist	Peak	Peak reached (week ending)	Weeks at peak
Singles in 1979
1 December 1979	7	"Walking on the Moon" ‡	The Police	1	8 December 1979	1
8 December 1979	8	"Another Brick in the Wall (Part 2)" ‡	Pink Floyd	1	15 December 1979	5
8 December 1979	5	"Que Sera Mi Vida (If You Should Go)" ‡	Gibson Brothers	5	8 December 1979	1
8 December 1979	7	"I Only Want to Be with You" ‡	The Tourists	4	15 December 1979	2
15 December 1979	5	"Rapper's Delight" ‡	The Sugarhill Gang	3	15 December 1979	1
15 December 1979	5	"My Simple Heart" ‡	The Three Degrees	9	22 December 1979	2
22 December 1979	5	"I Have a Dream" ‡	ABBA	2	22 December 1979	4
22 December 1979	5	"Day Trip to Bangor (Didn't We Have a Lovely Time)"	Fiddler's Dram	3	5 January 1980	1
22 December 1979	3	"Wonderful Christmastime"	Paul McCartney	6	5 January 1980	1
22 December 1979	8	"Brass in Pocket"	The Pretenders	1	19 January 1980	2
Singles in 1980
12 January 1980	2	"Tears of a Clown"/"Ranking Full Stop"	The Beat	6	12 January 1980	1
12 January 1980	4	"Please Don't Go"	KC and the Sunshine Band	3	19 January 1980	1
19 January 1980	4	"With You I'm Born Again"	Billy Preston & Syreeta	2	19 January 1980	2
19 January 1980	5	"My Girl"	Madness	3	26 January 1980	2
19 January 1980	5	"I'm in the Mood for Dancing"	The Nolans	3	9 February 1980	2
26 January 1980	4	"Babe"	Styx	6	26 January 1980	2
26 January 1980	3	"Green Onions"	Booker T. & the M.G.'s	7	26 January 1980	1
26 January 1980	1	"Better Love Next Time"	Dr. Hook	8	26 January 1980	1
26 January 1980	1	"I Want to Hold Your Hand"	Dollar	9	26 January 1980	1
2 February 1980	4	"Too Much Too Young (EP)"	The Specials	1	2 February 1980	2
2 February 1980	3	"It's Different for Girls"	Joe Jackson	5	2 February 1980	2
2 February 1980	6	"Coward of the County" (#9)	Kenny Rogers	1	16 February 1980	2
9 February 1980	3	"Someone's Looking at You"	The Boomtown Rats	4	16 February 1980	1
16 February 1980	3	"Captain Beaky"/"Wilfred the Weasel"	Keith Michell	5	16 February 1980	2
16 February 1980	5	"And the Beat Goes On"	The Whispers	2	23 February 1980	1
16 February 1980	1	"I Hear You Now"	Jon and Vangelis	8	16 February 1980	1
23 February 1980	5	"Atomic"	Blondie	1	1 March 1980	2
23 February 1980	3	"Carrie"	Cliff Richard	4	1 March 1980	1
23 February 1980	1	"Baby, I Love You"	Ramones	8	23 February 1980	1
23 February 1980	2	"So Good to Be Back Home Again"	The Tourists	8	1 March 1980	1
23 February 1980	3	"I Can't Stand Up for Falling Down"	Elvis Costello & The Attractions	4	8 March 1980	1
1 March 1980	5	"Take That Look Off Your Face" ^{[B]}	Marti Webb	3	8 March 1980	3
1 March 1980	2	"Rock with You"	Michael Jackson	7	1 March 1980	1
1 March 1980	6	"Together We Are Beautiful" (#8)	Fern Kinney	1	15 March 1980	1
8 March 1980	4	"Games Without Frontiers"	Peter Gabriel	4	15 March 1980	1
8 March 1980	4	"All Night Long"	Rainbow	5	15 March 1980	1
15 March 1980	1	"So Lonely"	The Police	6	15 March 1980	1
15 March 1980	3	"Do That to Me One More Time"	Captain & Tennille	7	15 March 1980	1
15 March 1980	5	"Turning Japanese"	The Vapors	3	29 March 1980	1
15 March 1980	1	"Hands Off...She's Mine"	The Beat	9	15 March 1980	1
22 March 1980	5	"Going Underground"/"Dreams of Children"	The Jam	1	22 March 1980	3
22 March 1980	6	"Dance Yourself Dizzy"	Liquid Gold	2	5 April 1980	2
22 March 1980	7	"Working My Way Back to You/Forgive Me, Girl" (#10)	The Detroit Spinners	1	12 April 1980	2
29 March 1980	1	"Echo Beach"	Martha and the Muffins	10	29 March 1980	1
5 April 1980	2	"Stomp!"	The Brothers Johnson	6	5 April 1980	1
5 April 1980	3	"Poison Ivy"	The Lambrettas	7	5 April 1980	1
5 April 1980	2	"Turn It On Again"	Genesis	8	5 April 1980	1
5 April 1980	5	"Sexy Eyes"	Dr. Hook	4	12 April 1980	1
5 April 1980	5	"King"/"Food for Thought"	UB40	4	19 April 1980	2
12 April 1980	3	"Night Boat to Cairo"	Madness	6	12 April 1980	1
19 April 1980	4	"Call Me"	Blondie	1	26 April 1980	1
19 April 1980	3	"Talk of the Town"	The Pretenders	8	19 April 1980	1
19 April 1980	5	"Silver Dream Machine"	David Essex	4	3 May 1980	1
26 April 1980	6	"Geno" (#7)	Dexys Midnight Runners	1	3 May 1980	2
26 April 1980	4	"Coming Up"	Paul McCartney	2	3 May 1980	1
3 May 1980	2	"Toccata"	Sky	5	3 May 1980	1
3 May 1980	1	"Check Out the Groove"	Bobby Thurston	10	3 May 1980	1
10 May 1980	5	"What's Another Year" ^{[C]}	Johnny Logan	1	17 May 1980	2
10 May 1980	1	"The Groove"	Rodney Franklin	7	10 May 1980	1
10 May 1980	1	"The Golden Years (EP)"	Motörhead	8	10 May 1980	1
10 May 1980	7	"No Doubt About It"	Hot Chocolate	2	24 May 1980	3
10 May 1980	2	"My Perfect Cousin"	The Undertones	9	17 May 1980	1
17 May 1980	3	"Mirror in the Bathroom"	The Beat	4	17 May 1980	2
17 May 1980	4	"She's Out of My Life"	Michael Jackson	3	24 May 1980	1
17 May 1980	2	"Hold On (To My Love)"	Jimmy Ruffin	7	17 May 1980	1
17 May 1980	2	"I Shoulda Loved Ya"	Narada Michael Walden	8	17 May 1980	1
24 May 1980	6	"Theme from M*A*S*H (Suicide Is Painless)"	The Mash	1	31 May 1980	3
24 May 1980	5	"Over You"	Roxy Music	5	14 June 1980	1
24 May 1980	4	"We Are Glass"	Gary Numan	5	31 May 1980	1
31 May 1980	4	"Rat Race"/"Rude Boys Outa Jail"	The Specials	5	7 June 1980	1
31 May 1980	7	"Funkytown"	Lipps Inc.	2	28 June 1980	2
7 June 1980	7	"Crying"	Don McLean	1	21 June 1980	3
7 June 1980	4	"Let's Get Serious"	Jermaine Jackson	8	14 June 1980	2
14 June 1980	4	"Back Together Again"	Roberta Flack & Donny Hathaway	3	28 June 1980	1
14 June 1980	2	"You Gave Me Love"	Crown Heights Affair	10	14 June 1980	2
21 June 1980	4	"Everybody's Got to Learn Sometime"	The Korgis	5	28 June 1980	1
21 June 1980	3	"Behind the Groove"	Teena Marie	6	28 June 1980	1
28 June 1980	3	"Simon Templer"/"Two Pints of Lager and a Packet of Crisps Please"	Splodgenessabounds	7	28 June 1980	2
28 June 1980	1	"Substitute"	Liquid Gold	8	28 June 1980	1
5 July 1980	5	"Xanadu"	Olivia Newton-John & Electric Light Orchestra	1	12 July 1980	2
5 July 1980	5	"Jump to the Beat"	Stacy Lattisaw	3	12 July 1980	2
5 July 1980	4	"My Way of Thinking"/"I Think It's Going to Rain"	UB40	6	19 July 1980	1
5 July 1980	1	"To Be or Not to Be"	BA Robertson	9	5 July 1980	1
12 July 1980	6	"Use It Up and Wear It Out"	Odyssey	1	26 July 1980	2
12 July 1980	4	"Cupid/I've Loved You for a Long Time"	The Detroit Spinners	4	19 July 1980	1
12 July 1980	5	"Could You Be Loved"	Bob Marley and the Wailers	5	19 July 1980	2
19 July 1980	4	"Babooshka"	Kate Bush	5	2 August 1980	1
19 July 1980	1	"Waterfalls"	Paul McCartney	9	19 July 1980	1
19 July 1980	5	"More Than I Can Say"	Leo Sayer	2	2 August 1980	1
26 July 1980	6	"Upside Down"	Diana Ross	2	9 August 1980	2
26 July 1980	1	"Emotional Rescue"	The Rolling Stones	9	26 July 1980	1
2 August 1980	1	"There, There, My Dear"	Dexys Midnight Runners	7	2 August 1980	1
2 August 1980	6	"The Winner Takes It All"	ABBA	1	9 August 1980	2
9 August 1980	6	"9 to 5"	Sheena Easton	3	16 August 1980	2
9 August 1980	4	"Oops Up Side Your Head"	The Gap Band	6	16 August 1980	1
9 August 1980	3	"Oh Yeah (On the Radio)"	Roxy Music	5	16 August 1980	1
9 August 1980	3	"Give Me the Night"	George Benson	7	16 August 1980	1
16 August 1980	6	"Ashes to Ashes"	David Bowie	1	23 August 1980	2
16 August 1980	1	"Funkin' for Jamaica (N.Y.)"	Tom Browne	10	16 August 1980	1
23 August 1980	5	"Start!"	The Jam	1	6 September 1980	1
23 August 1980	7	"Feels Like I'm in Love" (#3)	Kelly Marie	1	13 September 1980	2
23 August 1980	4	"Tom Hark"	The Piranhas	6	30 August 1980	1
30 August 1980	2	"I Die: You Die"	Gary Numan	6	6 September 1980	1
30 August 1980	2	"The Sunshine of Your Smile"	Mike Berry	9	6 September 1980	1
6 September 1980	4	"Eighth Day"	Hazel O'Connor	5	6 September 1980	2
6 September 1980	3	"Dreamin'"	Cliff Richard	8	13 September 1980	1
13 September 1980	5	"One Day I'll Fly Away"	Randy Crawford	2	20 September 1980	2
13 September 1980	4	"It's Only Love"/"Beyond the Reef" ^{[D]}	Elvis Presley	3	20 September 1980	1
13 September 1980	3	"Modern Girl"	Sheena Easton	8	20 September 1980	1
20 September 1980	5	"Master Blaster (Jammin')"	Stevie Wonder	2	4 October 1980	1
20 September 1980	3	"Another One Bites the Dust"	Queen	7	27 September 1980	1
27 September 1980	6	"Don't Stand So Close to Me" (#1)	The Police	1	27 September 1980	4
27 September 1980	6	"Baggy Trousers"	Madness	3	11 October 1980	2
27 September 1980	7	"D.I.S.C.O." (#5)	Ottawan	2	11 October 1980	3
4 October 1980	3	"My Old Piano"	Diana Ross	5	11 October 1980	1
4 October 1980	2	"Amigo"	Black Slate	9	11 October 1980	1
11 October 1980	1	"Stereotype"/"International Jet Set"	The Specials	6	11 October 1980	1
11 October 1980	6	"If You're Lookin' for a Way Out"	Odyssey	6	1 November 1980	1
11 October 1980	1	"Killer on the Loose"	Thin Lizzy	10	11 October 1980	1
18 October 1980	2	"Et Les Oiseaux Chantaient (And the Birds Were Singing)"	Sweet People	4	18 October 1980	1
18 October 1980	6	"What You're Proposing"	Status Quo	2	1 November 1980	2
18 October 1980	7	"Woman in Love" (#2)	Barbra Streisand	1	25 October 1980	3
18 October 1980	4	"When You Ask About Love"	Matchbox	4	1 November 1980	1
25 October 1980	2	"Gotta Pull Myself Together"	The Nolans	9	25 October 1980	2
25 October 1980	1	"Love X Love"	George Benson	10	25 October 1980	1
1 November 1980	4	"Special Brew"	Bad Manners	3	8 November 1980	2
1 November 1980	4	"Enola Gay"	Orchestral Manoeuvres in the Dark	8	1 November 1980	2
8 November 1980	3	"Dog Eat Dog"	Adam and the Ants	4	8 November 1980	1
8 November 1980	6	"The Tide is High" (#6)	Blondie	1	15 November 1980	2
8 November 1980	4	"Fashion"	David Bowie	5	22 November 1980	2
15 November 1980	4	"I Could Be So Good for You" ^{[E]}	Dennis Waterman	3	29 November 1980	1
15 November 1980	4	"Never Knew Love Like This Before"	Stephanie Mills	4	29 November 1980	1
22 November 1980	8	"Super Trouper" (#4)	ABBA	1	29 November 1980	3
29 November 1980	2	"Celebration"	Kool & the Gang	7	29 November 1980	1
29 November 1980	7	"(Just Like) Starting Over" ^{[F]}	John Lennon	1	20 December 1980	1
29 November 1980	4	"Banana Republic"	The Boomtown Rats	3	6 December 1980	1
29 November 1980	1	"The Earth Dies Screaming"/"Dream a Lie"	UB40	10	29 November 1980	1
6 December 1980	6	"Embarrassment"	Madness	4	6 December 1980	2
6 December 1980	3	"To Cut a Long Story Short"	Spandau Ballet	5	6 December 1980	1
6 December 1980	2	"Do You Feel My Love"	Eddy Grant	8	13 December 1980	1
13 December 1980	5	"There's No One Quite Like Grandma"	St Winifred's School Choir	1	27 December 1980	2
13 December 1980	6	"Stop the Cavalry"	Jona Lewie	3	13 December 1980	5
13 December 1980	6	"De Do Do Do, De Da Da Da"	The Police	5	20 December 1980	1
13 December 1980	4	"Runaway Boys"	Stray Cats	9	20 December 1980	1
20 December 1980	9	"Antmusic" ♦	Adam and the Ants	2	17 January 1981	2
27 December 1980	5	"Happy Xmas (War Is Over)" ♦ ^{[G]}	John Lennon, Yoko Ono & Plastic Ono Band with the Harlem Community Choir	2	10 January 1981	1
27 December 1980	8	"Imagine" ♦ ^{[H]}	John Lennon	1	10 January 1981	4

== Entries by artist ==
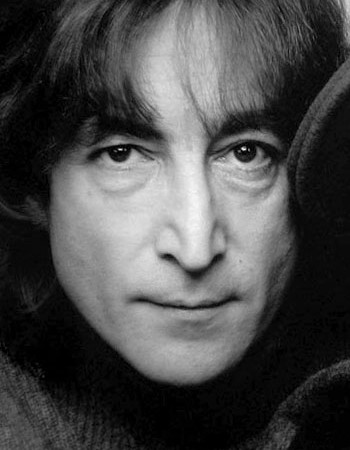
Following his death on 8 December this year, John Lennon hit the number-one spot in the UK with "(Just Like) Starting Over", which became the first of his three posthumous chart-toppers. His songs "Imagine" and "Happy Xmas (War Is Over)" also re-entered the top 10, reaching numbers one and two respectively in January 1981.

"Suicide Is Painless", the theme song from the film and television series M*A*S*H, spent three weeks at number-one in the UK charts in 1980, 10 years after the film's release.

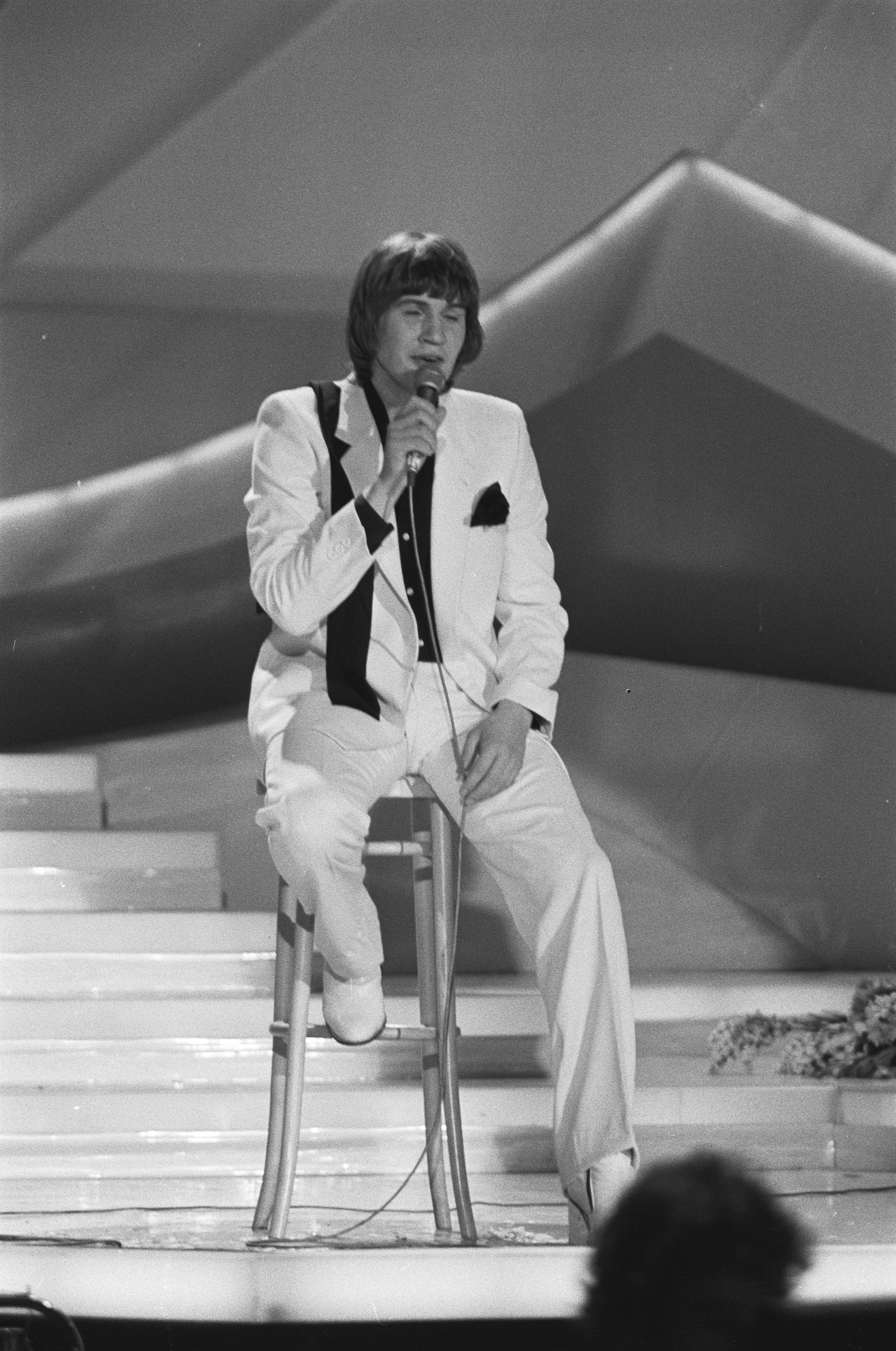
Johnny Logan won the 1980 Eurovision Song Contest, representing Ireland with "What's Another Year", which spent two weeks at number-one in the UK charts.

The following table shows artists who achieved two or more top 10 entries in 1980, including singles that reached their peak in 1979 or 1981. The figures include both main artists and featured artists, while appearances on ensemble charity records are also counted for each artist. The total number of weeks an artist spent in the top ten in 1980 is also shown.

Entries	Artist	Weeks	Singles
4	Madness	18	"Baggy Trousers", "Embarrassment", "My Girl", "Night Boat to Cairo"
4	The Police ^{[I]}	12	"De Do Do Do, De Da Da Da", "Don't Stand So Close to Me", "So Lonely", "Walking on the Moon"
3	ABBA ^{[I]}	15	"I Have a Dream", "Super Trouper", "The Winner Takes It All",
3	The Beat	6	"Hands Off...She's Mine", "Mirror in the Bathroom", "Tears of a Clown"/"Ranking Full Stop"
3	Blondie	15	"Atomic", "Call Me", "The Tide Is High"
3	John Lennon ^{[J]}	3	"Happy Xmas (War is Over)", "Imagine", "(Just Like) Starting Over"
3	Paul McCartney ^{[K]}	6	"Coming Up", "Waterfalls", "Wonderful Christmastime"
3	The Specials	9	"Rat Race"/"Rude Boys Outa Jail", "Stereotype"/"International Jet Set", "Too Much Too Young (EP)"
3	UB40	10	"King"/"Food for Thought", "My Way of Thinking"/"I Think It's Going to Rain Today", "The Earth Dies Screaming"/"Dream a Lie"
2	Adam and the Ants ^{[J]}	5	"Antmusic", "Dog Eat Dog"
2	The Boomtown Rats	7	"Banana Republic", "Someone's Looking at You"
2	Cliff Richard	6	"Carrie", "Dreamin'"
2	David Bowie	10	"Ashes to Ashes", "Fashion"
2	The Detroit Spinners	11	"Cupid/I've Loved You for a Long Time, "Working My Way Back to You/Forgive Me, Girl
2	Dexy's Midnight Runners	7	"Geno", "There, There, My Dear"
2	Diana Ross	9	"My Old Piano", "Upside Down"
2	Dr. Hook	6	"Better Love Next Time", "Sexy Eyes"
2	Gary Numan	6	"I Die: You Die", "We Are Glass"
2	George Benson	4	"Give Me the Night", "Love X Love"
2	The Jam	10	"Going Underground"/"Dreams of Children", "Start!"
2	Liquid Gold	7	"Dance Yourself Dizzy", "Substitute"
2	Michael Jackson	6	"Rock with You", "She's Out of My Life"
2	The Nolans	7	"Gotta Pull Myself Together", "I'm in the Mood for Dancing"
2	Odyssey	12	"If You're Lookin' for a Way Out", "Use It Up and Wear It Out"
2	The Pretenders	9	"Brass in Pocket", "Talk of the Down"
2	Roxy Music	8	"Oh Yeah (On the Radio)", "Over You"
2	Sheena Easton	9	"9 to 5", "Modern Girl"
2	The Tourists ^{[I]}	5	"I Only Want to Be with You", "So Good to Be Back Home Again"

== See also ==
- 1980 in British music
- List of number-one singles from the 1980s (UK)

== Notes ==
- ^{a} "Antmusic" reached its peak of number two on 17 January 1981 (week ending).
- ^{b} "Take That Look Off Your Face" was written for the Andrew Lloyd Webber musical Tell Me On a Sunday.
- ^{c} "What's Another Year" was Ireland's winning entry at the Eurovision Song Contest in 1980.
- ^{d} "It's Only Love" was originally released on its own without its double A-side "Beyond the Reef" in 1971 and charted in the US but not in the UK.
- ^{e} "I Could Be So Good for You" was the theme song to the television series Minder.
- ^{f} "(Just Like) Starting Over" re-entered the top 10 at number-one on 20 December 1980 (week ending), one week after John Lennon's murder.
- ^{g} "Happy Xmas (War is Over)" was first released as a single in the UK in 1972 and made the top 10, peaking at number 4. It re-entered the top 10 following John Lennon's death in December 1980, reaching its new peak of number 2 in January 1981.
- ^{h} "Imagine" was first released as a single in the UK in 1975 and made the top 10, peaking at number 6. It re-entered the top 10 following John Lennon's death in December 1980, reaching its new peak of number-one in January 1981.
- ^{i} Figure includes single that peaked in 1979.
- ^{j} Figure includes single that peaked in 1981.
- ^{k} Figure includes single that first charted in 1979 but peaked in 1980.
