= List of UK top-ten singles in 1979 =

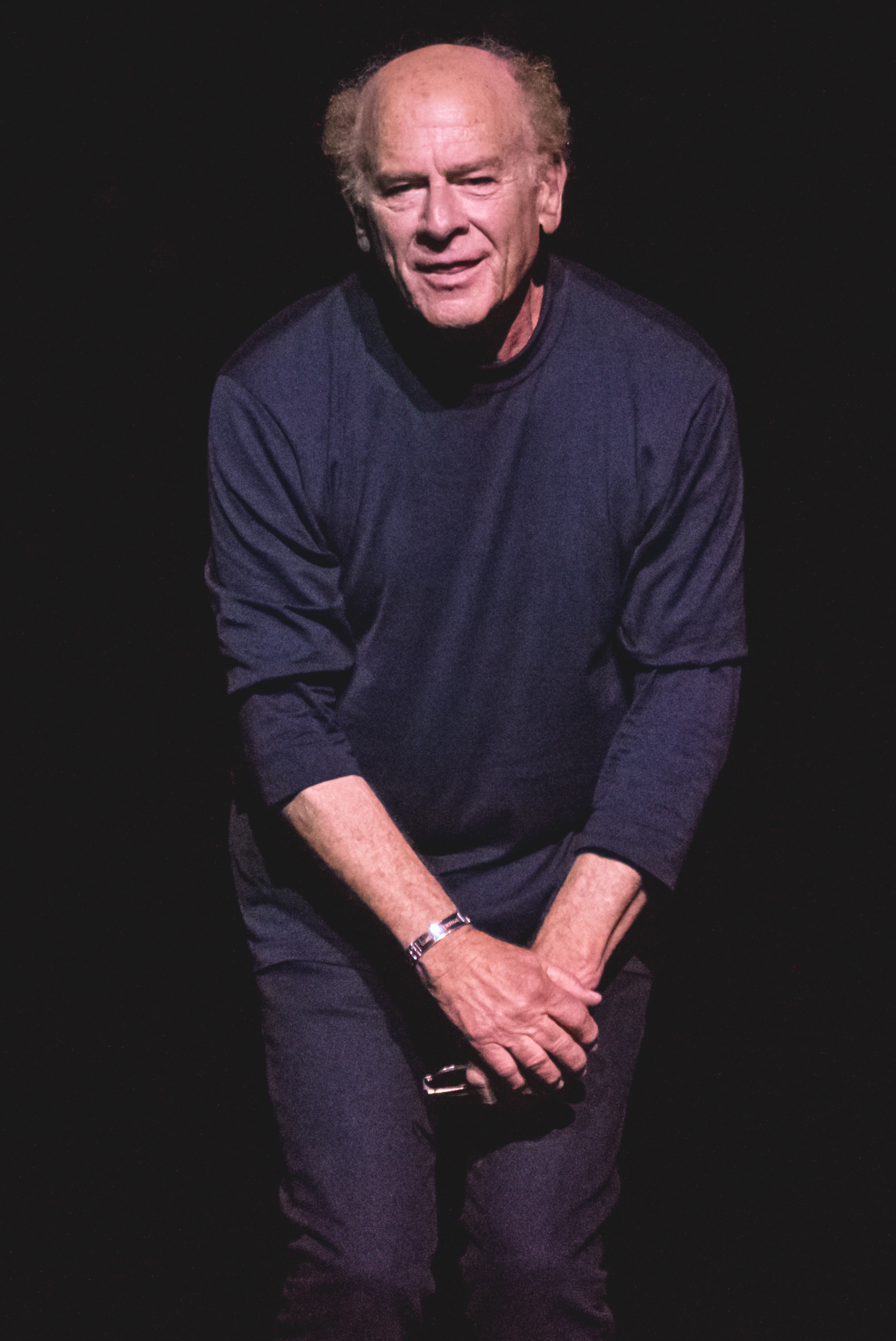
Art Garfunkel (pictured in 2017) had the best-selling single of 1979 with "Bright Eyes", which spent six weeks at number one.

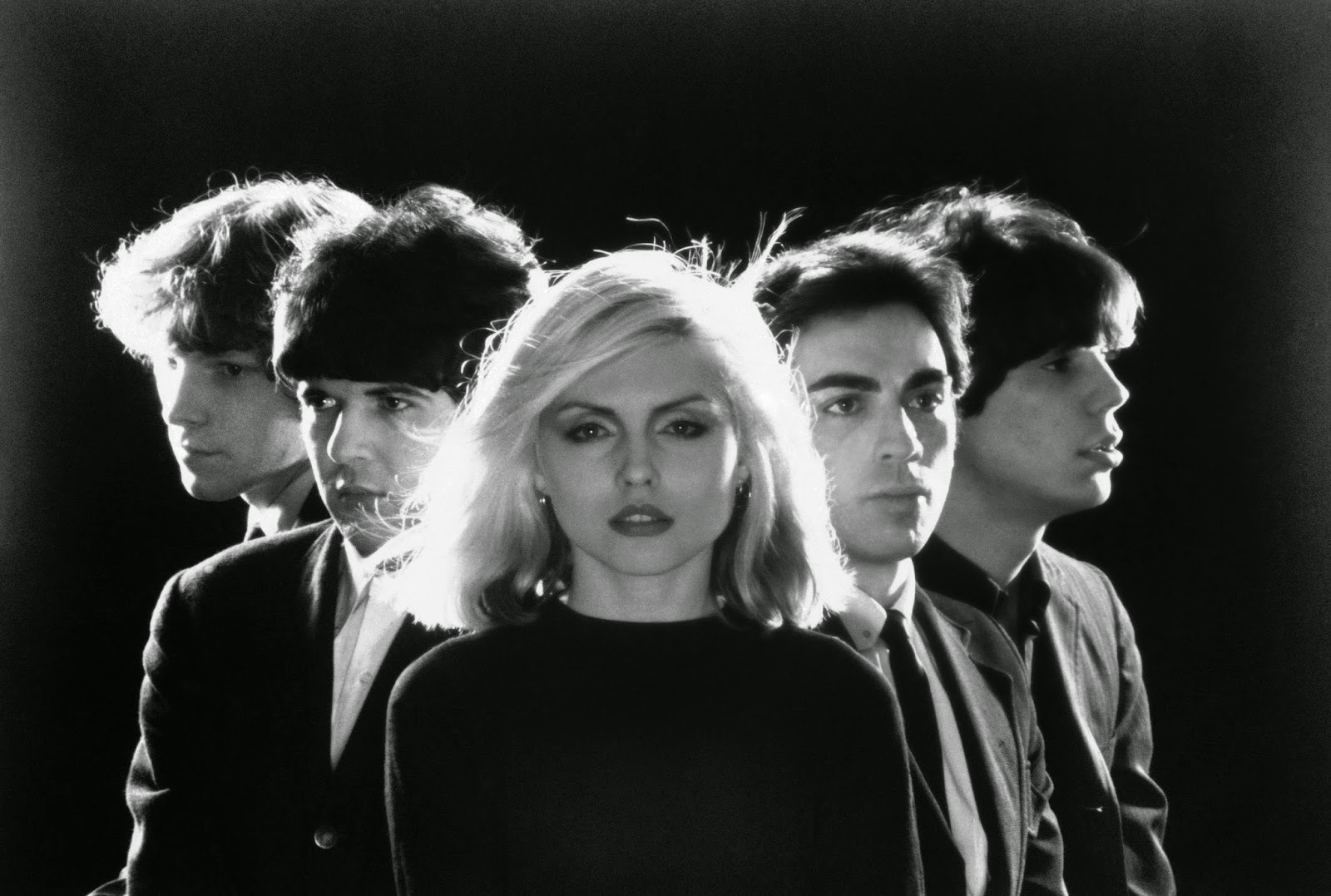
Blondie secured three top 10 singles this year, including two number ones: "Heart of Glass" and "Sunday Girl".

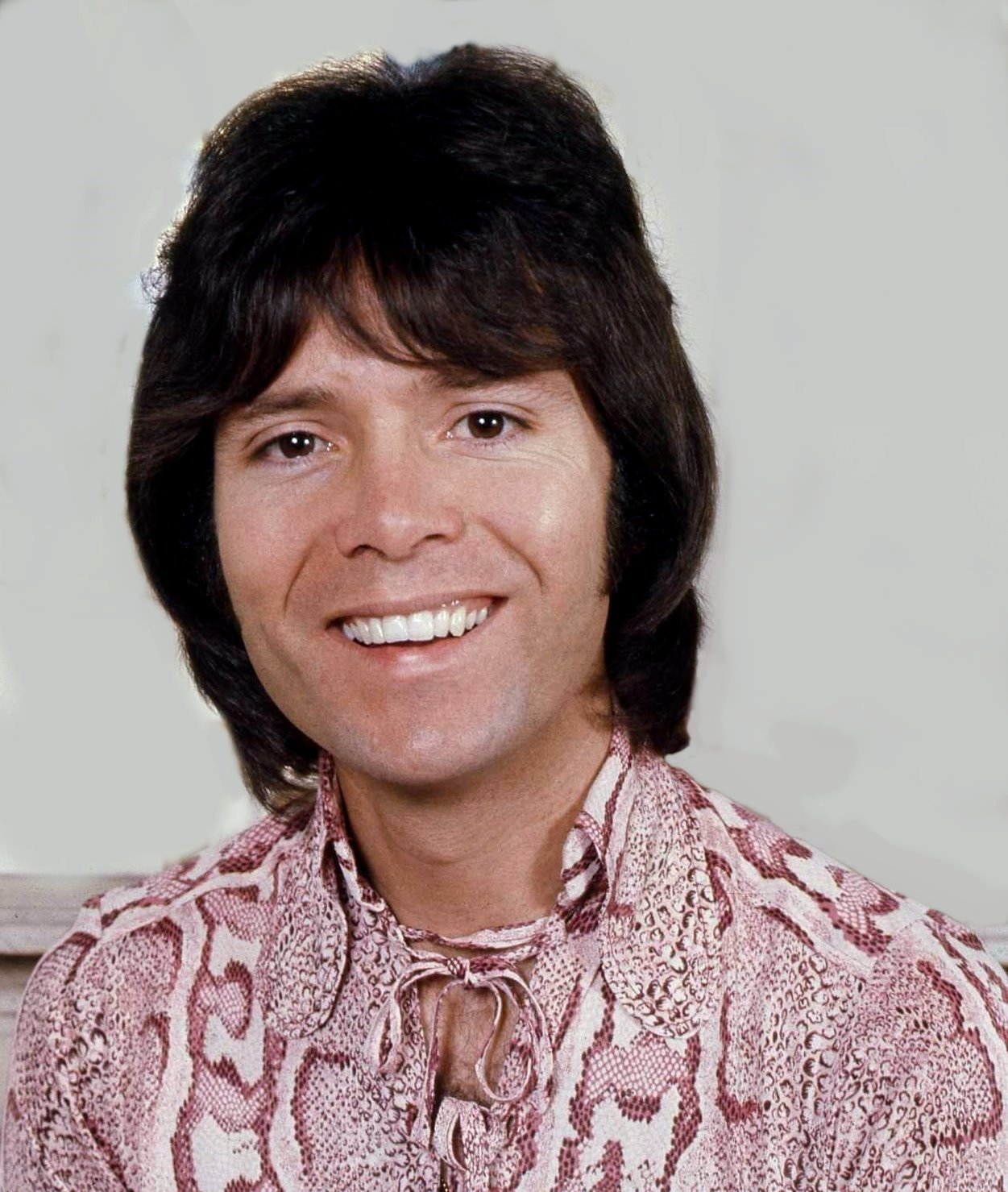
Cliff Richard achieved his tenth UK number-one single in August 1979 with "We Don't Talk Anymore", which became the third best selling single of the year.

The UK Singles Chart is one of many music charts compiled by the Official Charts Company that calculates the best-selling singles of the week in the United Kingdom. Before 2004, the chart was only based on the sales of physical singles. This list shows singles that peaked in the Top 10 of the UK Singles Chart during 1979, as well as singles which peaked in 1978 and 1980 but were in the top 10 in 1979. The entry date is when the single appeared in the top 10 for the first time (week ending, as published by the Official Charts Company, which is six days after the chart is announced).

One-hundred and forty-one singles were in the top ten in 1979. Nine singles from 1978 remained in the top 10 for several weeks at the beginning of the year, while "Day Trip to Bangor (Didn't We Have a Lovely Time)" by Fiddler's Dram, "Wonderful Christmastime" by Paul McCartney and "Brass in Pocket" by The Pretenders were all released in 1979 but did not reach their peak until 1980. "Song for Guy" by Elton John, "Lay Your Love on Me" by Racey and "Y.M.C.A." by The Village People were the singles from 1978 to reach their peak in 1979. Thirty-two artists scored multiple entries in the top 10 in 1979. Dire Straits, The Jam, Madness, The Police and The Specials were among the many artists who achieved their first UK charting top 10 single in 1979.

The 1978 Christmas number one, "Mary's Boy Child – Oh My Lord" by Boney M., remained at number one for the first two weeks of 1979. The first new number-one single of the year was "YMCA" by The Village People. Overall, eighteen different singles peaked at number one in 1979, with Blondie, Gary Numan and The Police (2) having the joint most singles hit that position.

== Background ==
=== Multiple entries ===
One-hundred and forty-one singles charted in the top 10 in 1979, with one-hundred and thirty-one singles reaching their peak this year.

Thirty-two artists scored multiple entries in the top 10 in 1979. ABBA secured the record for most top 10 hits in 1979 with five hit singles.

Gary Numan was one of a number of artists with two top-ten entries, including the number-one single "Cars". Barbra Streisand, Edwin Starr, Ian Dury and the Blockheads, Paul McCartney and The Specials were among the other artists who had multiple top 10 entries in 1979.

=== Chart debuts ===
Fifty-three artists achieved their first top 10 single in 1979, either as a lead or featured artist. Of these, eight went on to record another hit single that year: Amii Stewart, B. A. Robertson, Gary Numan, Gibson Brothers, Sister Sledge, The Specials, Squeeze and Supertramp. Earth, Wind and Fire and The Police both had two other entries in their breakthrough year.

The following table (collapsed on desktop site) does not include acts who had previously charted as part of a group and secured their first top 10 solo single.

Artist	Number of top 10s	First entry	Chart position	Other entries
Earth, Wind and Fire	3	"September"	3	"Boogie Wonderland" (4), "After the Love Has Gone" (4)
Paul Evans	1	"Hello, This Is Joannie"	6	—
Funkadelic	1	"One Nation Under a Groove"	9	—
Driver 67	1	"Car 67"	7	—
Leif Garrett	1	"I Was Made for Dancin'"	4	—
Dr. Feelgood	1	"Milk and Alcohol"	9	—
Elvis Costello	1	"Oliver's Army"	2	—
The Attractions	1	"Oliver's Army"	2	—
Lene Lovich	1	"Lucky Number"	3	—
Gary's Gang	1	"Keep On Dancin'"	8	—
Skids	1	"Into the Valley"	10	—
Players Association	1	"Turn the Music Up"	8	—
Squeeze	2	"Cool for Cats"	2	"Up the Junction" (2)
Dire Straits	1	"Sultans of Swing"	8	—
Tenpole Tudor	1	"Who Killed Bambi" (Part of double A-side with "Silly Thing" recorded by Sex Pistols)	6	—
Sister Sledge	2	"He's the Greatest Dancer"	6	"We Are Family" (8)
Milk and Honey	1	"Hallelujah"	5	—
M	1	"Pop Muzik"	2	—
Supertramp	2	"The Logical Song"	7	"Breakfast in America" (9)
Amii Stewart	2	"Knock on Wood"	6	"Light My Fire/137 Disco Heaven" (5)
Peaches & Herb	1	"Reunited"	4	—
The Dickies	1	"Banana Splits"	7	—
Eruption	1	"One Way Ticket"	9	—
Anita Ward	1	"Ring My Bell"	1	—
McFadden & Whitehead	1	"Ain't No Stoppin' Us Now"	5	—
Tubeway Army	1	"Are "Friends" Electric?"	1	—
Quantum Jump	1	"The Lone Ranger"	5	—
The Ruts	1	"Babylon's Burning"	7	—
The Knack	1	"My Sharona"	6	—
The Police	3	"Can't Stand Losing You"	2	"Message in a Bottle" (1), "Walking on the Moon" (1)
Patrick Hernandez	1	"Born to Be Alive"	10	—
BA Robertson	2	"Bang Bang"	2	"Knocked It Off" (8)
The Specials	2	"Gangsters"	6	"A Message to You Rudy"/"Nite Klub" (10)
The Flying Lizards	1	"Money"	5	—
Gibson Brothers	2	"Ooh, What a Life"	10	"Que Sera Mi Vida (If You Should Go)" (5)
Gary Numan	2	"Cars"	1	"Complex" (6)
The Crusaders	1	"Street Life"	5	—
Randy VanWarmer	1	"Just When I Needed You Most"	8	—
Dollar	1	"Love's Gotta Hold on Me"	4	—
Frantique	1	"Strut Your Funky Stuff"	10	—
The Buggles	1	"Video Killed the Radio Star"	1	—
Rainbow	1	"Since You Been Gone"	6	—
Lena Martell	1	"One Day at a Time"	1	—
Sad Café	1	"Every Day Hurts"	3	—
Viola Wills	1	"Gonna Get Along Without You Now"	8	—
The Jam	1	"The Eton Rifles"	3	—
The Selecter	1	"On My Radio"	8	—
Rico	1	"A Message to You, Rudy"/"Nite Klub"	10	—
Kool & the Gang	1	"Ladies' Night"	9	—
Madness	1	"One Step Beyond..."	7	—
The Tourists	1	"I Only Want to Be with You"	4	—
The Sugarhill Gang	1	"Rapper's Delight"	3	—
Fiddler's Dram	1	"Day Trip to Bangor (Didn't We Have a Lovely Time)" ^{[A]}	3	—

=== Songs from films ===
Original songs from various films entered the top 10 throughout the year. These included "Bright Eyes" (from Watership Down) and "Theme From "The Deer Hunter" (Cavatina)" (The Deer Hunter).

=== Best-selling singles ===
Art Garfunkel had the best-selling single of the year with "Bright Eyes". The single spent nine weeks in the top 10 (including six weeks at number one) and was certified platinum by the BPI. "Heart of Glass" by Blondie came in second place. Cliff Richard's "We Don't Talk Anymore", "I Don't Like Mondays" from The Boomtown Rats and "When You're in Love with a Beautiful Woman" by Dr. Hook made up the top five. Singles by Gloria Gaynor, Tubeway Army, Roxy Music, Blondie ("Sunday Girl") and Lena Martell were also in the top ten best-selling singles of the year.

== Top-ten singles ==
Key

Symbol	Meaning
‡	Single peaked in 1978 but still in chart in 1979.
♦	Single released in 1979 but peaked in 1980.
(#)	Year-end top-ten single position and rank
Entered	The date that the single first appeared in the chart.
Peak	Highest position that the single reached in the UK Singles Chart.

Entered (week ending)	Weeks in top 10	Single	Artist	Peak	Peak reached (week ending)	Weeks at peak
Singles in 1978
2 December 1978	7	"Mary's Boy Child – Oh My Lord" ‡	Boney M.	1	9 December 1978	4
2 December 1978	6	"I Lost My Heart to a Starship Trooper" ‡	Sarah Brightman and Hot Gossip	6	9 December 1978	2
9 December 1978	6	"Too Much Heaven" ‡	Bee Gees	3	9 December 1978	1
9 December 1978	6	"A Taste of Aggro" ‡	The Barron Knights	3	23 December 1978	2
9 December 1978	8	"Le Freak" ‡	Chic	7	16 December 1978	2
16 December 1978	9	"Y.M.C.A."	Village People	1	6 January 1979	3
16 December 1978	5	"You Don't Bring Me Flowers" ‡	Barbra Streisand and Neil Diamond	5	23 December 1978	2
23 December 1978	7	"Lay Your Love on Me"	Racey	3	6 January 1979	3
23 December 1978	5	"Song for Guy"	Elton John	4	13 January 1979	1
Singles in 1979
6 January 1979	7	"Hit Me with Your Rhythm Stick"	Ian Dury & The Blockheads	1	27 January 1979	1
13 January 1979	5	"September"	Earth, Wind & Fire	3	27 January 1979	1
20 January 1979	4	"A Little More Love"	Olivia Newton-John	4	27 January 1979	1
20 January 1979	2	"Hello, This Is Joannie"	Paul Evans	6	20 January 1979	1
20 January 1979	1	"One Nation Under a Groove"	Funkadelic	9	20 January 1979	1
20 January 1979	4	"Car 67" ^{[B]}	Driver 67	7	3 February 1979	1
27 January 1979	6	"Woman in Love"	The Three Degrees	3	3 February 1979	3
27 January 1979	8	"Heart of Glass" (#2)	Blondie	1	3 February 1979	4
27 January 1979	5	"Don't Cry for Me Argentina"	The Shadows	5	10 February 1979	2
3 February 1979	6	"Chiquitita"	ABBA	2	10 February 1979	2
10 February 1979	4	"I Was Made for Dancin'"	Leif Garrett	4	17 February 1979	1
17 February 1979	5	"Contact"	Edwin Starr	6	17 February 1979	2
17 February 1979	6	"Tragedy"	Bee Gees	1	3 March 1979	2
17 February 1979	2	"Milk and Alcohol"	Dr. Feelgood	9	17 February 1979	1
24 February 1979	7	"Oliver's Army"	Elvis Costello & The Attractions	2	10 March 1979	3
24 February 1979	9	"I Will Survive" (#6)	Gloria Gaynor	1	17 March 1979	4
3 March 1979	6	"Lucky Number"	Lene Lovich	3	24 March 1979	1
3 March 1979	1	"Get It"	Darts	10	3 March 1979	1
10 March 1979	4	"Can You Feel the Force?"	The Real Thing	5	10 March 1979	3
10 March 1979	5	"Something Else"/"Friggin' in the Riggin'"	Sex Pistols	3	31 March 1979	1
10 March 1979	1	"Painter Man"	Boney M.	10	10 March 1979	1
17 March 1979	4	"I Want Your Love"	Chic	4	7 April 1979	1
17 March 1979	3	"Keep On Dancin'"	Gary's Gang	8	24 March 1979	1
24 March 1979	1	"Waiting for an Alibi"	Thin Lizzy	9	24 March 1979	1
24 March 1979	1	"Into the Valley"	Skids	10	24 March 1979	1
31 March 1979	4	"In the Navy"	Village People	2	31 March 1979	2
31 March 1979	2	"Turn the Music Up"	Players Association	8	31 March 1979	1
31 March 1979	1	"Don't Stop Me Now"	Queen	9	31 March 1979	1
7 April 1979	9	"Bright Eyes" (#1)	Art Garfunkel	1	14 April 1979	6
7 April 1979	5	"Cool for Cats"	Squeeze	2	14 April 1979	1
7 April 1979	2	"Sultans of Swing"	Dire Straits	8	7 April 1979	2
14 April 1979	5	"Some Girls"	Racey	2	21 April 1979	3
14 April 1979	2	"He's the Greatest Dancer"	Sister Sledge	6	14 April 1979	1
14 April 1979	2	"Silly Thing"/"Who Killed Bambi" ^{[C]}	Sex Pistols/Tenpole Tudor	6	21 April 1979	1
14 April 1979	4	"Shake Your Body (Down to the Ground)"	The Jacksons	4	21 April 1979	2
14 April 1979	3	"The Runner"	The Three Degrees	10	14 April 1979	3
21 April 1979	3	"Hallelujah" ^{[D]}	Milk and Honey	5	21 April 1979	1
28 April 1979	7	"Pop Muzik"	M	2	12 May 1979	2
28 April 1979	3	"The Logical Song"	Supertramp	7	28 April 1979	1
28 April 1979	3	"Goodnight Tonight"	Wings	5	5 May 1979	1
5 May 1979	4	"Hooray! Hooray! It's a Holi-Holiday"	Boney M.	3	12 May 1979	2
5 May 1979	3	"Knock on Wood"	Amii Stewart	6	19 May 1979	1
12 May 1979	4	"Does Your Mother Know"	ABBA	4	12 May 1979	3
12 May 1979	6	"Reunited"	Peaches & Herb	4	2 June 1979	1
12 May 1979	1	"Banana Splits"	The Dickies	7	12 May 1979	1
19 May 1979	8	"Dance Away" (#8)	Roxy Music	2	26 May 1979	3
19 May 1979	2	"Parisienne Walkways" ^{[E]}	Gary Moore	8	19 May 1979	1
19 May 1979	2	"One Way Ticket"	Eruption	9	19 May 1979	1
19 May 1979	7	"Sunday Girl" (#9)	Blondie	1	26 May 1979	3
26 May 1979	7	"Boogie Wonderland"	Earth, Wind & Fire with The Emotions	4	9 June 1979	3
26 May 1979	3	"Boys Keep Swinging"	David Bowie	7	2 June 1979	1
2 June 1979	4	"Theme From The Deer Hunter (Cavatina)"	The Shadows	9	2 June 1979	2
9 June 1979	6	"Ring My Bell"	Anita Ward	1	16 June 1979	2
9 June 1979	2	"Shine a Little Love"	Electric Light Orchestra	6	9 June 1979	2
9 June 1979	4	"Ain't No Stoppin' Us Now"	McFadden & Whitehead	5	16 June 1979	1
16 June 1979	8	"Are 'Friends' Electric?" (#7)	Tubeway Army	1	30 June 1979	4
16 June 1979	2	"We Are Family"	Sister Sledge	8	16 June 1979	1
16 June 1979	2	"H.A.P.P.Y. Radio" ^{[F]}	Edwin Starr	9	30 June 1979	1
23 June 1979	5	"Up the Junction"	Squeeze	2	7 July 1979	1
23 June 1979	4	"The Lone Ranger"	Quantum Jump	5	30 June 1979	1
30 June 1979	4	"Night Owl"	Gerry Rafferty	5	7 July 1979	1
7 July 1979	5	"Silly Games"	Janet Kay	2	14 July 1979	2
7 July 1979	3	"Light My Fire/137 Disco Heaven"	Amii Stewart	5	14 July 1979	1
7 July 1979	4	"C'mon Everybody"	Sex Pistols	3	14 July 1979	2
14 July 1979	1	"Babylon's Burning"	The Ruts	7	14 July 1979	1
14 July 1979	3	"Lady Lynda"	The Beach Boys	6	21 July 1979	1
21 July 1979	4	"Girls Talk"	Dave Edmunds	4	21 July 1979	3
21 July 1979	2	"Good Times"	Chic	5	21 July 1979	1
21 July 1979	5	"Wanted"	The Dooleys	3	4 August 1979	1
28 July 1979	7	"I Don't Like Mondays" (#4)	The Boomtown Rats	1	28 July 1979	4
28 July 1979	2	"My Sharona"	The Knack	6	28 July 1979	1
28 July 1979	2	"Breakfast in America"	Supertramp	9	4 August 1979	1
4 August 1979	3	"Can't Stand Losing You"	The Police	2	4 August 1979	1
4 August 1979	4	"Angeleyes"/"Voulez-Vous"	ABBA	3	11 August 1979	1
4 August 1979	1	"Beat the Clock"	Sparks	10	4 August 1979	1
11 August 1979	8	"We Don't Talk Anymore" (#3)	Cliff Richard	1	25 August 1979	4
11 August 1979	4	"Reasons to Be Cheerful, Part 3"	Ian Dury & The Blockheads	3	18 August 1979	1
11 August 1979	3	"Hersham Boys"	Sham 69	6	18 August 1979	1
11 August 1979	3	"The Diary of Horace Wimp"	Electric Light Orchestra	8	11 August 1979	1
11 August 1979	1	"Born to Be Alive"	Patrick Hernandez	10	11 August 1979	1
18 August 1979	4	"After the Love Has Gone"	Earth, Wind & Fire	4	18 August 1979	1
18 August 1979	3	"Duke of Earl"	Darts	6	25 August 1979	1
25 August 1979	5	"Bang Bang"	BA Robertson	2	8 September 1979	1
25 August 1979	3	"Gangsters"	The Specials	6	1 September 1979	2
1 September 1979	4	"Angel Eyes"	Roxy Music	4	1 September 1979	2
1 September 1979	3	"Money"	The Flying Lizards	5	8 September 1979	1
1 September 1979	1	"Ooh, What a Life"	Gibson Brothers	10	1 September 1979	1
8 September 1979	6	"Cars"	Gary Numan	1	22 September 1979	1
8 September 1979	4	"Street Life"	The Crusaders	5	15 September 1979	1
8 September 1979	3	"Just When I Needed You Most"	Randy VanWarmer	8	15 September 1979	1
15 September 1979	4	"Don't Bring Me Down"	Electric Light Orchestra	3	22 September 1979	1
15 September 1979	5	"If I Said You Have a Beautiful Body Would You Hold It Against Me"	The Bellamy Brothers	3	29 September 1979	1
15 September 1979	4	"Love's Gotta Hold on Me"	Dollar	4	29 September 1979	1
22 September 1979	6	"Message in a Bottle"	The Police	1	29 September 1979	3
29 September 1979	5	"Dreaming"	Blondie	2	6 October 1979	1
29 September 1979	1	"Sail On"	Commodores	8	29 September 1979	1
29 September 1979	1	"Strut Your Funky Stuff"	Frantique	10	29 September 1979	1
6 October 1979	3	"Whatever You Want"	Status Quo	4	6 October 1979	1
6 October 1979	5	"Video Killed the Radio Star"	The Buggles	1	20 October 1979	1
6 October 1979	5	"Don't Stop 'Til You Get Enough"	Michael Jackson	3	20 October 1979	1
6 October 1979	3	"Since You Been Gone"	Rainbow	6	13 October 1979	1
13 October 1979	7	"One Day at a Time" (#10)	Lena Martell	1	27 October 1979	3
13 October 1979	1	"On Stage (EP)"	Kate Bush	10	13 October 1979	1
20 October 1979	5	"Every Day Hurts"	Sad Café	3	3 November 1979	1
20 October 1979	9	"When You're in Love with a Beautiful Woman" (#5)	Dr. Hook	1	17 November 1979	3
20 October 1979	3	"The Chosen Few"	The Dooleys	7	27 October 1979	2
27 October 1979	5	"Gimme! Gimme! Gimme! (A Man After Midnight)"	ABBA	3	10 November 1979	1
27 October 1979	4	"Tusk"	Fleetwood Mac	6	10 November 1979	1
3 November 1979	2	"Gonna Get Along Without You Now"	Viola Wills	8	10 November 1979	1
3 November 1979	6	"Crazy Little Thing Called Love"	Queen	2	24 November 1979	2
10 November 1979	4	"The Eton Rifles"	The Jam	3	24 November 1979	1
10 November 1979	2	"On My Radio"	The Selecter	8	17 November 1979	1
10 November 1979	4	"Still"	Commodores	4	24 November 1979	2
17 November 1979	1	"A Message to You Rudy"/"Nite Klub"	The Specials featuring Rico	10	17 November 1979	1
24 November 1979	4	"No More Tears (Enough Is Enough)"	Donna Summer & Barbra Streisand	3	1 December 1979	2
24 November 1979	2	"Knocked It Off"	BA Robertson	8	24 November 1979	1
24 November 1979	1	"Ladies' Night"	Kool & the Gang	9	24 November 1979	1
24 November 1979	4	"One Step Beyond"	Madness	7	1 December 1979	1
1 December 1979	7	"Walking on the Moon"	The Police	1	8 December 1979	1
1 December 1979	2	"Complex"	Gary Numan	6	1 December 1979	1
1 December 1979	2	"Confusion"/"Last Train to London"	Electric Light Orchestra	8	1 December 1979	1
8 December 1979	8	"Another Brick in the Wall (Part 2)"	Pink Floyd	1	15 December 1979	5
8 December 1979	5	"Que Sera Mi Vida (If You Should Go)"	Gibson Brothers	5	8 December 1979	1
8 December 1979	7	"I Only Want to Be with You"	The Tourists	4	15 December 1979	2
15 December 1979	5	"Rapper's Delight"	The Sugarhill Gang	3	15 December 1979	1
15 December 1979	1	"Off The Wall"	Michael Jackson	7	15 December 1979	1
15 December 1979	5	"My Simple Heart"	The Three Degrees	9	22 December 1979	2
22 December 1979	5	"I Have a Dream"	ABBA	2	22 December 1979	4
22 December 1979	5	"Day Trip to Bangor (Didn't We Have a Lovely Time)" ♦	Fiddler's Dram	3	5 January 1980	1
22 December 1979	3	"Wonderful Christmastime" ♦ ^{[G]}	Paul McCartney	6	5 January 1980	1
22 December 1979	8	"Brass in Pocket" ♦	The Pretenders	1	19 January 1980	2

== Entries by artist ==
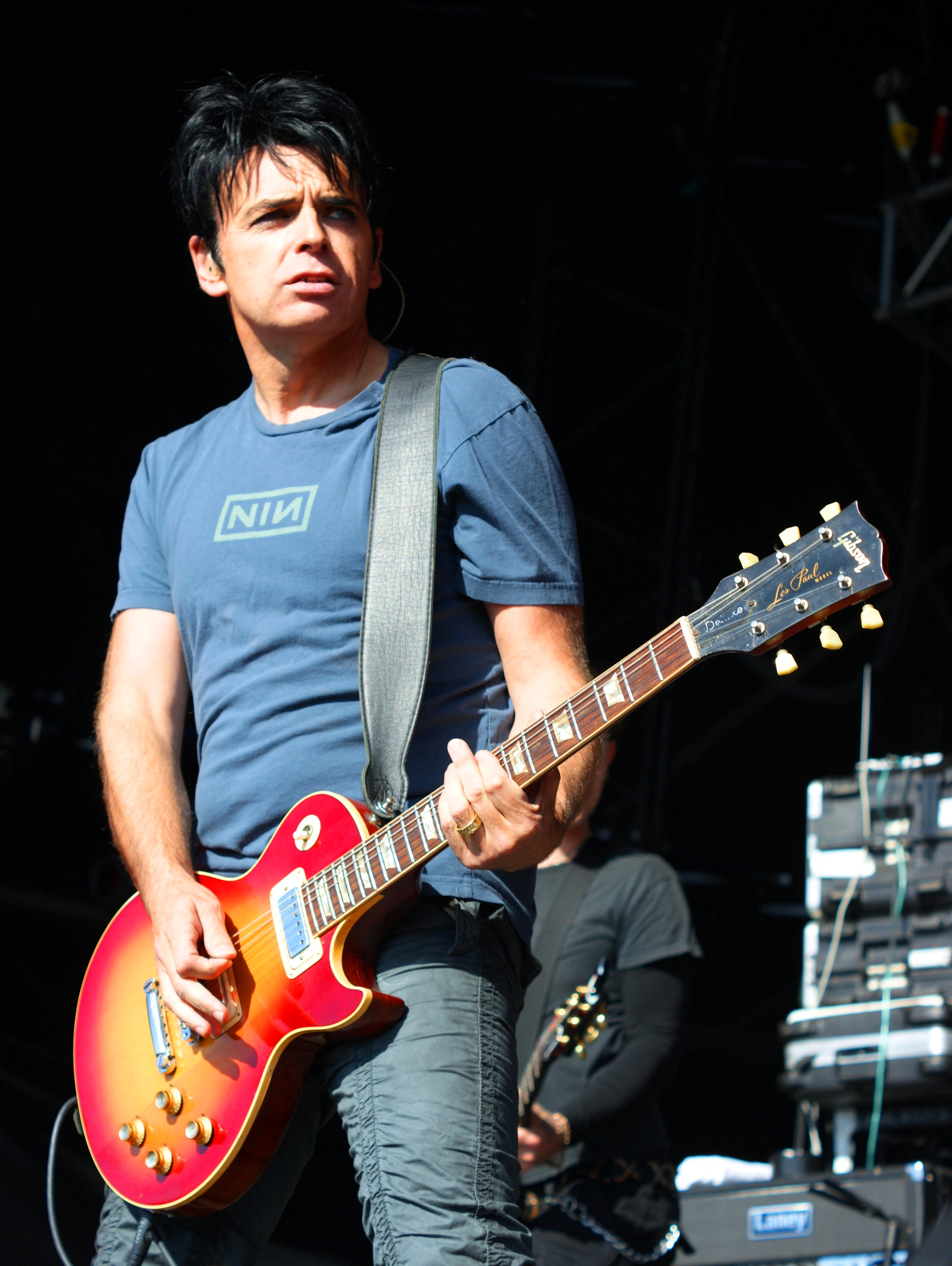
Gary Numan (pictured in 2011) achieved three UK top 10 singles this year, two of which reached number one. As the frontman of Tubeway Army, he spent four weeks at the top spot in June and July with "Are "Friends" Electric?", while he topped the chart on his own in September with "Cars".

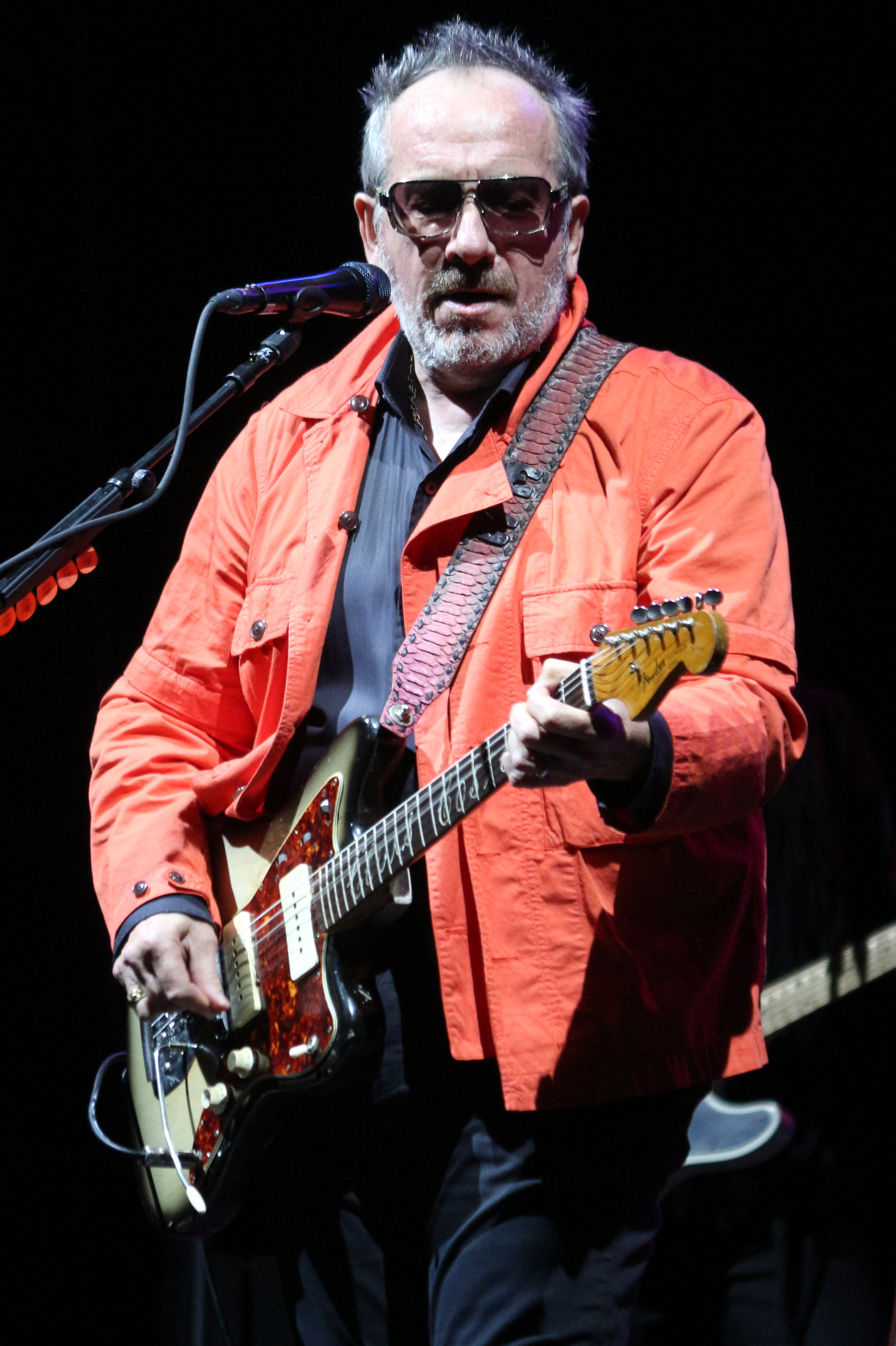
Elvis Costello (pictured in 2021) secured his highest-charting UK single in 1979 with "Oliver's Army", featuring his band The Attractions, which spent three weeks at number two in March.

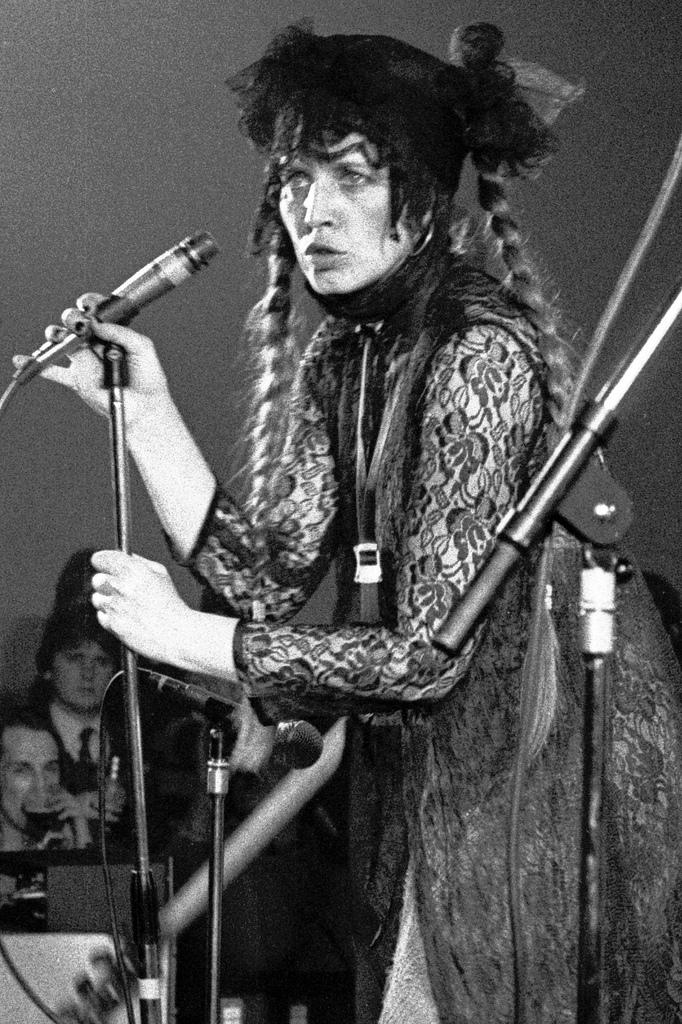
American-born singer Lene Lovich achieved her only UK top 10 hit this year with "Lucky Number", which spent five weeks in the top 10, peaking at number three.

The following table shows artists who achieved two or more top 10 entries in 1979, including singles that reached their peak in 1978 or 1980. The figures include both main artists and featured artists, while appearances on ensemble charity records are also counted for each artist. The total number of weeks an artist spent in the top ten in 1979 is also shown.

Entries	Artist	Weeks	Singles
5	ABBA	21	"Angeleyes"/"Voulez-Vous", "Chiquitita", "Does Your Mother Know", "Gimme! Gimme! Gimme! (A Man After Midnight)", "I Have a Dream"
4	Electric Light Orchestra	11	"Confusion"/"Last Train to London", "Don't Bring Me Down", "Shine a Little Love", "The Diary of Horace Wimp"
3	Blondie	20	"Dreaming", "Heart of Glass", "Sunday Girl"
3	Boney M. ^{[H]}	7	"Hooray! Hooray! It's a Holi-Holiday", "Mary's Boy Child - Oh My Lord", "Painter Man"
3	Chic ^{[H]}	10	"Good Times", "I Want Your Love", "Le Freak"
3	Earth, Wind & Fire	16	"After the Love Has Gone", "Boogie Wonderland", "September"
3	Gary Numan	16	"Are "Friends" Electric?", "Cars", "Complex"
3	Michael Jackson ^{[I]}	10	"Don't Stop 'Til You Get Enough", "Off the Wall", "Shake Your Body (Down to the Ground)"
3	The Police	14	"Can't Stand Losing You", "Message in a Bottle", "Walking on the Moon"
3	Sex Pistols	11	"C'mon Everybody", "Silly Thing", "Somethin' Else"/"Friggin' in the Riggin'"
3	The Three Degrees	12	"My Simple Heart", "The Runner", "Woman in Love"
2	Amii Stewart	6	"Knock on Wood", "Light My Fire/137 Disco Heaven"
2	BA Robertson	7	"Bang Bang", "Knocked It Off"
2	Barbra Streisand ^{[H]}	6	"No More Tears (Enough is Enough)", "You Don't Bring Me Flowers"
2	Bee Gees ^{[H]}	8	"Too Much Heaven", "Tragedy"
2	The Blockheads	11	"Hit Me With Your Rhythm Stick", "Reasons to Be Cheerful, Part 3"
2	The Commodores	5	"Sail On", "Still"
2	Darts	4	"Duke of Earl", "Get It"
2	The Dooleys	8	"The Chosen Few", "Wanted"
2	Edwin Starr	7	"Contact", "H.A.P.P.Y. Radio"
2	Gary Moore ^{[J]}	3	"Parisienne Walkways", "Waiting for an Alibi"
2	Gibson Brothers	5	"Ooh, What a Life", "Que Sera Mi Vida (If You Should Go)"
2	Ian Dury	11	"Hit Me With Your Rhythm Stick", "Reasons to Be Cheerful, Part 3"
2	Paul McCartney ^{[K]}^{[L]}	5	"Goodnight Tonight", "Wonderful Christmastime"
2	Queen	7	"Crazy Little Thing Called Love", "Don't Stop Me Now"
2	Racey ^{[M]}	11	"Lay Your Love on Me", "Some Girls"
2	Roxy Music	12	"Angel Eyes", "Dance Away"
2	The Shadows	9	"Don't Cry for Me Argentina", "Theme from The Deer Hunter (Cavatina)"
2	Sister Sledge	4	"He's the Greatest Dancer", "We Are Family"
2	The Specials	4	"A Message to You Rudy"/"Nite Klub", "Gangsters"
2	Squeeze	10	"Cool for Cats", "Up the Junction"
2	Supertramp	5	"Breakfast in America", "The Logical Song"
2	The Village People ^{[M]}	10	"In the Navy", "Y.M.C.A."

== See also ==
- 1979 in British music
- List of number-one singles from the 1970s (UK)

== Notes ==
- ^{a} "Day Trip to Bangor (Didn't We Have a Lovely Time)" reached its peak of number-three on 5 January 1980 (week ending).
- ^{b} "Car 67" re-entered the top 10 at number 7 on 3 February 1979 (week ending) for 3 weeks.
- ^{c} Tenpole Tudor are only featured on "Who Killed Bambi". The song was released as a double-A side single in the United Kingdom with "Silly Thing".
- ^{d} "Hallelujah" was Israel's winning entry at the Eurovision Song Contest in 1979.
- ^{e} "Parisienne Walkways" re-entered the top 10 at number 10 on 2 June 1979 (week ending).
- ^{f} "H.A.P.P.Y. Radio" re-entered the top 10 at number 9 on 30 June 1979 (week ending).
- ^{g} Only Paul McCartney was credited for "Wonderful Christmastime" but the rest of his group, Wings, were featured in the promotional music video.
- ^{h} Figure includes single that peaked in 1978.
- ^{i} Figure includes a top 10 hit with the group The Jacksons.
- ^{j} Figure includes a top 10 hit with the group Thin Lizzy.
- ^{k} Figure includes a top 10 hit with the group Wings.
- ^{l} Figure includes single that peaked in 1980.
- ^{m} Figure includes single that first charted in 1978 but peaked in 1979.
