= List of number-one singles in 1979 (New Zealand) =

This is a list of number-one hit singles in 1979 in New Zealand, starting with the first chart dated 20 January 1979.

== Chart ==
Key
‡ – Single of New Zealand origin

Week	Artist	Title
21 January 1979	Bee Gees	"Too Much Heaven"
28 January 1979	Chic	"Le Freak"
4 February 1979	Chic	"Le Freak"
11 February 1979	Chic	"Le Freak"
18 February 1979	Chic	"Le Freak"
25 February 1979	The Village People	"Y.M.C.A."
4 March 1979	The Village People	"Y.M.C.A."
11 March 1979	The Pointer Sisters	"Fire"
18 March 1979	Bee Gees	"Tragedy"
25 March 1979	Bee Gees	"Tragedy"
1 April 1979	Bee Gees	"Tragedy"
8 April 1979	Bee Gees	"Tragedy"
15 April 1979	Bee Gees	"Tragedy"
22 April 1979	Bee Gees	"Tragedy"
29 April 1979	Blondie	"Heart of Glass"
6 May 1979	ABBA	"Chiquitita"
13 May 1979	Blondie	"Heart of Glass"
20 May 1979	Blondie	"Heart of Glass"
27 May 1979	Blondie	"Heart of Glass"
3 June 1979	Promises	"Baby It's You"
10 June 1979	Promises	"Baby It's You"
17 June 1979	Promises	"Baby It's You"
24 July 1979	Promises	"Baby It's You"
1 July 1979	Promises	"Baby It's You"
8 July 1979	Racey	"Lay Your Love On Me"
15 July 1979	Racey	"Lay Your Love On Me"
22 July 1979	Racey	"Lay Your Love On Me"
29 July 1979	Anita Ward	"Ring My Bell"
5 August 1979	Racey	"Some Girls"
12 August 1979	Racey	"Some Girls"
19 August 1979	Racey	"Some Girls"
26 August 1979	Racey	"Some Girls"
2 September 1979	Racey	"Some Girls"
9 September 1979	Racey	"Some Girls"
16 September 1979	Kiss	"I Was Made For Lovin' You"
23 September 1979	Robert John	"Sad Eyes"
30 September 1979	Kiss	"I Was Made For Lovin' You"
7 October 1979	Kiss	"I Was Made For Lovin' You"
14 October 1979	Kiss	"I Was Made For Lovin' You"
21 October 1979	Patrick Hernandez	"Born to Be Alive"
28 October 1979	Patrick Hernandez	"Born to Be Alive"
4 November 1979	Michael Jackson	"Don't Stop 'til You Get Enough"
11 November 1979	Michael Jackson	"Don't Stop 'til You Get Enough"
18 November 1979	Michael Jackson	"Don't Stop 'til You Get Enough"
25 November 1979	Michael Jackson	"Don't Stop 'til You Get Enough"
2 December 1979	Jon Stevens	"Jezebel"^{‡}
9 December 1979	Jon Stevens	"Jezebel"^{‡}
16 December 1979	Jon Stevens	"Jezebel"^{‡}
23 December 1979	Jon Stevens	"Jezebel"^{‡}
30 December 1979	Jon Stevens	"Jezebel"^{‡}

== Notes ==
- Number of number-one singles: 16
- Longest run at number-one: "Tragedy" by Bee Gees and "Some Girls" by Racey (6 weeks).
- Jezebel continued its peak at number one during January 1980
