= Day Trip to Bangor (Didn't We Have a Lovely Time) =

- UK vinyl single

Single by Fiddler's Dram

from the album Fiddler's Dram
- B-side: "The Flash Lad"
- Released: 1979
- Recorded: 1979
- Genre: Folk
- Length: 2:58
- Label: Dingle's Records (UK) RCA (GER/POR) RCA Victor (AUS/ESP/NED) Release Records (IRL) Planet Records (SWE)
- Songwriter: Debbie Cook
- Producer: David Foister

Fiddler's Dram singles chronology
"Day Trip to Bangor (Didn't We Have a Lovely Time)" (1979)	"Beercart Lane (Dancing in the Moonlight)" (1980)

Music video
- "Day Trip to Bangor" on YouTube

"Day Trip to Bangor (Didn't We Have a Lovely Time)" is a single by the British folk group Fiddler's Dram. The novelty song was released in 1979 and peaked at number 3 at the start of 1980. The song was written by Debbie Cook and recorded by the lead singer of the band, Cathy Lesurf. The single was the group's only chart entry in their career, making them one hit wonders.

== Controversy ==
The release was shrouded in controversy after reports that the song was actually inspired by a trip to Rhyl, another town in North Wales. It was rumoured that Bangor was chosen as the lyric due to it having an extra syllable that flowed better with the song. There were rumours of an outcry among local councillors and businesses in Rhyl about the missed opportunity for tourism which would have been generated. Cook stated that the song was specifically written about Bangor.

== Use in popular culture ==
In 1981, the song was parodied by the comedian Jasper Carrott, with his version renamed "Daytrip to Blackpool."

The Barron Knights also did a parody version of the song called “Didn’t we have a lovely time (At the office Christmas party)” on their 1980 UK hit single Never Mind The Presents.

The song was adapted, with changed lyrics, for a UK commercial for Anchor butter which ran from 1980.

Paul Dakeyne did a mash-up of the song at the Chris Moyles Weekender in Bangor in 2010.

"Day Trip to Bangor (Didn't We Have a Lovely Time)" was adapted by Vic Reeves and Bob Mortimer for their BBC sitcom House of Fools which began in January 2014. The opening scene of each episode sees the duo sing a song to the tune of "Day Trip to Bangor". The show ran for two series, ending in March 2015 after thirteen episodes.

== Charts ==
=== Chart performance ===
The single entered the UK Singles Chart at number 26 on 13 December 1979 (week ending) two weeks before Christmas. It rose to number 4 for the following two weeks before reaching its peak of number 3 on 5 January 1980 (week ending). It spent two further weeks in the top 10, dropping to number 4 and then number 9 a week later. It was in the top 40 for one more week at number 24, and two final weeks in the top 100. It was also a sizeable hit in Australia where it reached number 8 in March 1980.

=== Weekly charts ===
Chart (1980)	Peak position
Australia (Kent Music Report)	8
Ireland (IRMA)	6
UK Singles (Official Charts Company)	3

=== Year-end charts ===
Chart (1980)	Peak position
Australia (Kent Music Report)	60
