= Beat Boys in the Jet Age =

Studio album by The Lambrettas
- Released: 1980
- Genre: Mod revival
- Label: Rocket
- Producer: Peter Collins

The Lambrettas chronology
Beat Boys in the Jet Age (1980)	Ambience (1981)

Singles from Beat Boys In The Jet Age
- 1. "Poison Ivy" Released: 1980; 2. "Da-a-ance" Released: 1980; 3. "Another Day (Another Girl)" Released: 1980

Beat Boys in the Jet Age was the debut album by English power pop group The Lambrettas. It included their hit cover version of the song "Poison Ivy" which reached #7 in the UK Singles Chart. They'd would continue this success with the release of their own "Da-a-ance", reaching #12 in the UK Singles Chart. The album reached #28 on the UK Albums Chart, and scored another minor hit single, "Another Day (Another Girl)" which reached #49 on the UK Singles Chart.

== Reception ==
Professional ratings
Review scores
Source	Rating
Allmusic	4.5/5 stars
Smash Hits	6/10

Reviewing the album for Smash Hits in 1980, Red Starr says, "Strong enough to surprise the cynics but too mod cliched to make much impression elsewhere". Starr says the band write "some strong pop tunes" and adds that their lyrics "show the potential to contribute something original".

Allmusic - 4.5 out of 5 - The band's debut picks up on all of the elements that made the early Jam albums brilliant, a certain reverence for '60s pop with a youthful, forward-looking attitude, punk's high-charged energy and strong songwriting. Beat Boys in the Jet Age is an unfortunately forgotten album which features some of the era's best teen anthems and serves as a highpoint of the often disappointing mod revival.

== Track listing ==
1. "Da-a-ance" (Jez Bird) - 2:57
2. "Cortina MK II" (Bird, Doug Sanders) - 2:36
3. "London Calling" (Bird) - 3:54
4. "Poison Ivy" (Jerry Leiber, Mike Stoller) - 2:45
5. "Leap Before You Look" (Bird) - 2:24
6. "Beat Boys in the Jet Age" (Bird, Sanders) - 2:19
7. "Another Day, Another Girl (Page 3)" (Bird) - 2:49
8. "Living for Today" (Sanders) - 2:43
9. "Watch Out I'm Back" (Bird, Sanders) - 2:50
10. "Don't Push Me" (Bird) - 3:58
11. "Runaround" (Bird, Sanders) - 2:56
12. "Face to Face" (Sanders) - 3:08

== Personnel ==
The Lambrettas

- Jez Bird – vocals, guitar
- Doug Sanders – guitar, vocals
- Mark Ellis – bass
- Paul Wincer – drums

with:

- Dick Hanson, Martin Dobson, Peter Thoms, Ron Asprey - horns on "Poison Ivy"

Technical

- Pete Hammond - engineer
- Albert De Gouveia - cover, photography

== See also ==
- The Lambrettas
