= Dance Yourself Dizzy =

1980 single by Liquid Gold

Single by Liquid Gold

from the album Liquid Gold
- B-side: "Dance Yourself Dizzy" (Instrumental)
- Released: February 1980
- Genre: Disco
- Length: 3:59
- Label: Polo
- Songwriters: Adrian Baker, Eddie Seago
- Producer: Adrian Baker

Liquid Gold singles chronology
| "My Baby's Baby" (1979) | "Dance Yourself Dizzy" (1980) | "Substitute" (1980) |

"Dance Yourself Dizzy" is a 1980 song by Liquid Gold taken from their self-titled album. It was the band's biggest hit in the UK, peaking at number two and being certified silver for sales of 250,000.

== Recording ==
Some of the members of Liquid Gold did not have great belief in the song, such as Syd Twynham; however, lead singer Ellie Hope was more hopeful for its success. Syd Twynham recalled, "We didn't think it really going to happen but we were playing a residency at Caesar's Palace in Luton and the song came on and everyone was dancing so we were really surprised when it took off the way it did".

== Reception ==
Barry Lederer in Billboard was positive: "As with the first hit, this new release is, equally, energetic, uplifting and a step forward for the group."

== Charts ==
=== Weekly charts ===
| Chart (1980) | Peak position |
|---|---|
| Belgium (Ultratop 50 Flanders) | 5 |
| Ireland (IRMA) | 2 |
| Netherlands (Dutch Top 40) | 10 |
| Netherlands (Single Top 100) | 12 |
| UK Singles (Official Charts) | 2 |
| US Billboard Disco Top 100 | 28 |

=== Year-end charts ===
| Chart (1980) | Position |
|---|---|
| Belgium (Ultratop Flanders) | 63 |
| Netherlands (Single Top 100) | 99 |

== Covers and samples ==
In 1999, Northern Irish DJ Paul Masterson, working under the alias Yomanda, sampled "Dance Yourself Dizzy" for his track "Synth & Strings", which reached number eight on the UK Singles Chart.
