= Boy Oh Boy (Racey song) =

- Single cover

Single by Racey

from the album Smash and Grab
- B-side: "Sensational Buzz"
- Released: 1979
- Genre: Pop
- Length: 2:55
- Label: RAK
- Songwriter(s): Glo Macari, Roger Ferris
- Producer(s): Mickie Most

Racey singles chronology
"Some Girls" (1979)	"Boy Oh Boy" (1979)	"Such a Night" (1979)

"Boy Oh Boy" is a song by the British pop band Racey. It was written by Glo Macari and Roger Ferris, produced by Mickie Most and released 1979 on RAK Records. It reached number 2 in South Africa, spending 19 weeks on the top 20.

== Charts ==
=== Weekly charts ===
Chart (1979)	Peak position
Australian (Kent Music Report)	12

=== Year-end charts ===
Chart (1979)	Position
Australia (Kent Music Report)	79

== Certifications ==
Region	Certification
Denmark (IFPI Danmark)	Silver
