= Ambience (album) =

Studio album by The Lambrettas
- Released: 1981
- Genre: Power pop
- Label: Rocket
- Producer: Peter Collins

The Lambrettas chronology
Beat Boys in the Jet Age (1981)	Ambience (1981)	Kick Start (1985)

Singles from Ambience
- 1. "Good Times" Released: 1981; 2. "Decent Town" Released: 1981

Professional ratings
Review scores
Source	Rating
AllMusic	3/5 stars

Ambience is The Lambrettas' second album. Unlike their first album Beat Boys in the Jet Age, it was not a success. The band had tried to move on from their power pop sound but failed to attract a wider audience. The album includes singles "Good Times" and "Decent Town".

== Reception ==
AllMusic gave the album a rating of 3 stars out of 5, with a review by Chris Woodstra: "As the mod revival was running out of steam, the band took a step away from the sound for a more mature and varied album. No longer is their main concern motor scooters, girls, and living for today as evident in the haunting "Good Times" and "Decent Town". Though it failed commercially, Ambience is a fine collection of Brit-pop worth seeking out."

== Track listing ==
1. "Good Times" (Jez Bird, Doug Sanders) - 3:59
2. "Written to Neon" (Bird) - 3:27
3. "Total Strangers" (Bird, Sanders) - 4:13
4. "Concrete and Steel" (Bird) - 4:09
5. "Dancing in the Dark" (Bird) - 2:45
6. "Decent Town" (Sanders) - 4:02
7. "Ambience" (Bird, Sanders) - 3:14
8. "Men in Blue" (Bird) - 4:43
9. "I Want to Tell You" (George Harrison) - 2:33
10. "Someone Talking" (Bird, Sanders) - 4:59

== Personnel ==
- Jez Bird – vocals, guitar
- Doug Sanders – guitar, vocals
- Mark Ellis – bass
- Stephen Bray – percussion

with:

- Wesley Magoogan – saxophone

Production/engineering

- Steve James – producer
- Robin Heggie – engineer
- Craig Thompson – engineer

Graphics

- Keith McEwan – art direction and design
- Brian Burrows – sleeve remix (on CD reissue)
