= Adrian Baker =

English singer-songwriter (born 1951)

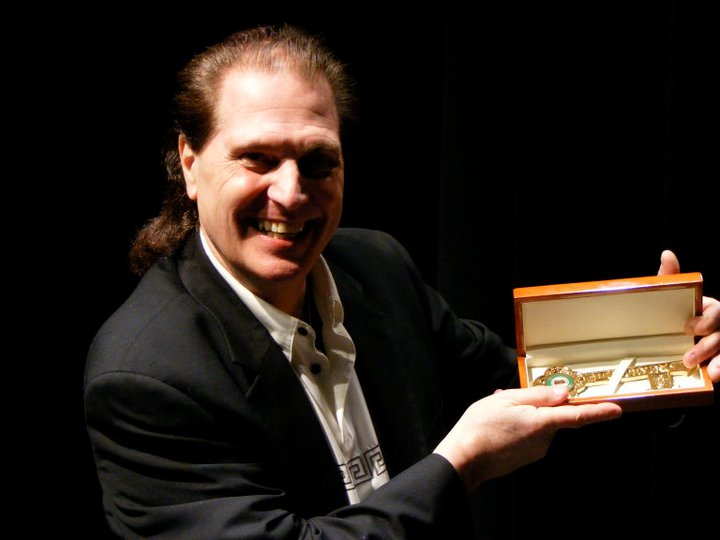
- Baker with the Key to the City of Hickory, North Carolina, United States

Background information
- Born: 18 January 1951 (age 75)
- Origin: London, England
- Genres: Pop, disco, library music
- Occupations: Singer, songwriter, record producer
- Years active: 1968–present
- Labels: Magnet/EPIC (1975–1979); Polo Records (1980–1990); ABP Records (1991–present)
- Website: AdrianBakerProductions.com

Adrian Baker (born 18 January 1951) is an English singer, songwriter, and record producer.

== Career ==
Baker made his debut as a singer on Magnet Records/Epic Records in the United Kingdom. In 1975, he released his first solo album, Into a Dream (MAG 5009). From that album, he had one hit with "Sherry" a cover of the Four Seasons hit on the UK Singles Chart reaching No. 10 in July 1975, and performed several times on the BBC Television's Top of the Pops programme. As a record producer, Baker is known for his dance hit productions with the group Liquid Gold.

He twice attempted to write the UK's entry for the Eurovision Song Contest, reaching the A Song For Europe final in both 1979 and 1981. His first finalist song, "Miss Caroline Newley", performed by the band M Squad finished 11th of the 12 in 1979. But in 1981, his song "Don't Panic", performed by Liquid Gold, finished in second place and had the rare distinction of being a losing song from the A Song For Europe contest to make the UK Singles Chart, reaching No. 42.

Baker, with his band Gidea Park, recorded a version of the Beach Boys "California Girls" for the James Bond film, A View to a Kill. It was featured in the opening sequence with Bond snowboarding. It has been suggested that this teaser sequence helped initiate interest in snowboarding.

In the United States, he is best known for being the falsetto voice for the touring Beach Boys band from 1981 to 1982, 1990 to 1993, and 1998 to 2004. Baker was also a member of The Four Seasons with Frankie Valli from 1994 to 1995. In 2006, Baker released his sixth solo album, Runaway Tracks.

On 19 March 2011, Baker was presented with the Key to the City of Hickory, North Carolina, United States, for his efforts raising money for education. Baker was Honorary Chairman of the Hickory Rotary Club's Rotarian Idol Education Scholarship competition for the second consecutive year. He is currently touring with the band Papa Doo Run Run.

== Tenure ==
- The Pebbles – 1969–1971
- Playground – 1972–1975
- Adrian Baker Band – 1975–1980
- Gidea Park – 1981–1989
- The Beach Boys – 1981–1982
- The Beach Boys – 1990–1993
- Frankie Valli & The Four Seasons – 1994–1995
- The Beach Boys – 1998–2004
- Papa Doo Run Run – 2004–present
- Baker Street – present

== Discography ==
=== Albums ===
- Into a Dream (Magnet/Epic Records) MAG 5009 · 1975
- Gidea Park (Polo Records) POLP 102 · November 1981 (as Gidea Park)
- ABCD (AKB Records) AKB-1 · 1991
- Everyone Needs Someone at Xmas (ABP Records) ABP 101 · 2003
- Surfer's Paradise (ABP Records) ABP 102 · 2004
- The Christmas Song EP (ABP Records) ABP 101-B · 2005
- Runaway Tracks (ABP Records) ABP 111 · 2006
- California Girls (ABP Records) ABP 300 · 2010
- Gold Medleys (ABP Records) ABP 301 · 2011
- Summer of Gold (ABP Records) ABP 302 · 2013
- Into A Dream 50th Anniversary Edition (ABP Records) ABP 50 • 2026

=== Singles ===
- "Sherry" / "I Was Only Fooling" · Magnet Records (MAG 34) · July 1975
- "Candy Baby" / "Dance To It" · Magnet Records (MAG 41) · 1975
- "White Christmas" / "Leave Me Alone" · Magnet Records (Mag 52) · (as The Tonics) · December 1975
- "Don't Do It" / "So You Think You've Got It Made" · Magnet Records (MAG 61) · 9 April 1976
- "Why Haven't I Heard From You" / "Vibrations" · Magnet Records (MAG 77) · 22 October 1976
- "Adrian Baker E.P." (A-Side (1) "Work, Work, Work" (2) "Marlena" B-Side (1) "Look for a Miracle" (2) "Cry Baby Cry")· Magnet Records (Mag) 117 · 1978
- "I'll Keep You Satisfied" / "Feel Like Dancing" · MCA (MCA 395) · 1978
- "Beach Boy Gold" / "Lady Be Good" · Stone (Son 2162) · (as Gidea Park) · 1978 - AUS No. 49
- "The Boogie Romance" / "From Me To You" · Ariola (Aro 167) 1979
- "California Gold" / "Summer Girls" · Polo Records (POLO 12-5) (as Aero) · August 1980
- "High Time" / "High Time" (instrumental) · Polo Records (POLO 12-7) · April 1981
- "Beach Boy Gold" / "Lady Be Good" · Stone (Son) 2162. (as Gidea Park) · July 1981 (re-issued in picture sleeve)
- "Don't Worry Baby" / "Happy Birthday Brian Wilson" · Polo Records (POLO 11) · August 1981 (withdrawn)
- "Seasons of Gold" / "Lolita" · Polo Records (POLO 14) (as Gidea Park) · September 1981 (issued in picture sleeve)
- "California Gold" / "Summer Girls" · Polo Records (POLO 16) · (as Gidea Park) · 1982
- "Lightning Strikes" / "Baby Come Back" · Polo Records (POLO 12–18) · (as Gidea Park) · January 1982 - AUS No. 82
- "Beach Boy Gold Part II" / "Summer Girls" · Polo Records (POLO 12–22) · (as Gidea Park) · July 1982
- "Summertime City" / "American Girls" Mayfair Records (Fair 1) (as Mayfair) · 1984 (issued in picture sleeve)
- "I Get Around" / "Lazin' On The Beach" / "Stay Healthy" · Polo Records (POLO 12MX1) · (as Gidea Park) · 1985
- "Sherry" / "Stay Healthy" · ABP Records (ABP 120-S) · 2006
- "Have Yourself A Merry Little Christmas" (CD single) · ABP Records (ABP 150) · 2007
- "God Only Knows" · ABP Records (ABP promo) · 2008
- "Have Yourself A Merry Little Christmas" / "The Christmas Song" · ABP Records (ABP 151) · 2008
- "Missing Kissing You" / "Cherie" · ABP Records (ABP 152) · 2009
- "Jingle Bells" · ABP Records (ABP 124-S) · 2010
- "Jingle Bell Rock" · ABP Records · 2010 (Digital Release Only)
- "Christmas Party Time" · ABP Records (ABP-X-101) · 2011
- "Poltergeist" · ABP Records (ABP-999) · 2014
- "Thriller" · ABP Records · 2017 (As Adrian Baker & Baker Street Band) (Digital Release Only)
- "My Christmas Wish" · ABP Records · 2017 (Digital Release Only)
- "Over The Top In Love" · ABP Records (ABP-303) · 2020

=== Other credits ===
- Mike & Dean – Christmas Party (Hit Bound Records) · 1983 (producer and vocals)
- Elton John – Reg Strikes Back (Rocket Records – MCA) · 1988 "Since God Invented Girls" (w/ The Beach Boys on background vocals)
- Various artists · Two Rooms: Celebrating the Songs of Elton John & Bernie Taupin (Polydor) · 1991 "Crocodile Rock" (w/ The Beach Boys on vocals)
- The Beach Boys · Summer in Paradise (Brother Records) · 1992 (vocals)
- Salute to NASCAR (Tasco Marketing) · 1998 (producer and vocalist)
- Papa Doo Run Run · 40th Anniversary DVD (Blue Pacific Records) BRP 2601 · 2006 (vocals and guitar)
- Papa Doo Run Run · Soundtrack + 6 (Blue Pacific Records) BRP 20071 · 2007 (vocals and guitar)
- Chris Farmer · California Dreamin (CF Records) CFM 101 · 2008 (guitar)
- Papa Doo Run Run · Greenifornia (Blue Pacific Records) BRP · 2008 (producer, vocals, guitar)
- Adrian Baker with Baker Street and Friends · Biggest Little Christmas (ABP Records) ABP/BKS 0001 · 2009 (vocals, produced, arranged, multiple instruments)
- The Beach Boys – That's Why God Made the Radio (2012) (vocals on "Daybreak Over The Ocean")

== Chart information ==
=== Solo releases ===
- "Sherry" · No. 10 UK; on the chart for eight weeks · 1975
- "Beach Boy Gold" · No. 11 UK; on chart for 13 weeks · 1981
- "Seasons of Gold" · No. 28 UK; on chart for six weeks · 1981 · #82 on Billboard Hot 100 (January 1982)

=== With Liquid Gold ===
All songs produced, arranged, written, and engineered by Adrian Baker

- "Anyway You Do It" · No. 41 UK; on the chart for seven weeks · 1978
- "My Baby's Baby" · No. 45 US; on the chart for six weeks · 1978
- "Dance Yourself Dizzy" · No. 2 UK; on chart for 14 weeks · 1980
- "Substitute" · No. 8 UK; on chart for nine weeks · 1980
- "The Night, The Wine and The Roses" · No. 32 UK; on chart for seven weeks · 1980
- Liquid Gold (album) · No. 34 UK; on the chart for three weeks · 1980
- "Don't Panic" · No. 42 UK; on the chart for five weeks · 1981
