= Cathy Lesurf =

- Born: 1953 (age 72–73)
- Origin: Stevenage, Hertfordshire, United Kingdom
- Genres: Folk

Cathy Lesurf (born 1953) is a British folk music singer-songwriter who was brought up in Stevenage, Hertfordshire. She has been a member of bands in the 1970s such as Oyster Ceilidh Band, Fiddler's Dram, and The Albion Band. She released a solo album, Surface, in 1985, the same year that she appeared as a guest vocalist on the Fairport Convention album Gladys' Leap. She created and ran the World in 1 County festival from 2002 to 2007. In November 2009, she released the solo single "This Christmas", which was written by her husband, David Wilson.

== Discography ==
Solo singles

- "This Christmas" (2009)

Solo albums

- Surface (1985)

With Fairport Convention

- Gladys' Leap (1985)

With The Albion Band

- Light Shining (1983)
- Under the Rose (1984)
- A Christmas Present from the Albion Band (1985)
- Stella Maris (1987)
- The Wild Side Of Town (1987)
- Live in Concert (1993) (tracks 8 – 11, recorded 1982)
- Live at the Cambridge Folk Festival (1998) (tracks 7 – 11, recorded 1987)

With Oyster Band

- English Rock 'n' Roll The Early Years 1800–1850 (1982)

With Oyster Ceilidh Band

- Jack's Alive (1980)

With Fiddler's Dram

- To See the Play (1978)
- Fiddler's Dram (1980)

With Wolfscote

- Turn the Glass (2015)
