= Rodney Franklin =

American jazz pianist and composer (1958–2026)

Background information
- Born: Rodney Thomas Franklin; September 16, 1958; Berkeley, California, U.S.
- Died: July 8, 2026 (aged 67)
- Genres: Jazz; jazz fusion
- Occupation: Musician
- Instrument: Piano
- Years active: 1972–2026

Rodney Thomas Franklin (September 16, 1958 – July 8, 2026) was an American jazz pianist and composer.

== Life and career ==
Franklin was born in Berkeley, California, on September 16, 1958. In 1964, aged six, he took jazz piano lessons at the Washington Elementary School and was taught by Herb Wong who was a jazz journalist, disc jockey and music teacher. In 1972 at the young age of 14 he led the funk-jazz band In One Piece (alt. In One Peace) performing his first 3 recordings at a studio in Ray Dobar's House of Music in Berkeley, California. Produced by George Semper, only one of the songs has been released on the 2003 Inner City Sounds 2X LP Compilation released on Luv N'Haight Ubiquity Recordings.

Prior to signing up with CBS Records in 1978, Franklin worked with John Handy in San Francisco, as well as Bill Summers, Freddie Hubbard and Marlena Shaw.

His debut CBS album was In the Center (1978), a jazz fusion album featuring "On the Path" and "I Like the Music Make It Hot". Although aged 20 when he recorded the album, he had already developed his own sound which was influenced by McCoy Tyner and George Duke, Chick Corea, Lonnie Liston Smith, and George Semper.

In 1980 on the album You'll Never Know he had major chart success with "The Groove" (it reached number 7 in the UK Singles Chart). The track was released on both 7" and 12" format. It created a UK dance craze called 'The Freeze' which was started up by DJ Chris Hill.

Additional albums which were also recorded on the CBS label have included Rodney Franklin (1980), Endless Flight (1981), Learning to Love (1982), Marathon (1984) (probably his most famous in the UK, produced by bass player Stanley Clarke and the LP which released a single called Stay on in the Groove), Skydance (1985) and It Takes Two (1986).

In 1988 he moved over to the BMG record label and recorded Diamond Inside of You which introduced vocals by Jennifer Holliday on the single, "Gotta Give It Up". In addition, Franklin has also produced and released an album on Nova Records called Love Dancin' in 1992.

Franklin died on July 8, 2026, at the age of 67.

== Discography ==
=== Albums ===
Year	Title	Peak chart positions				
Year	Title	UK	US	US Jazz	US Cont. Jazz	US R&B
1978	In the Center	—	—	—	x	—
1980	You'll Never Know	64	104	10	x	25
1980	Rodney Franklin	—	207	12	x	62
1981	Endless Flight	—	—	15	x	47
1982	Learning to Love	—	190	9	x	45
1984	Marathon	—	187	15	x	54
1985	Skydance	—	—	31	x	—
1986	It Takes Two	—	—	34	x	—
1988	Diamond Inside of You	—	—	—	20	—
1992	Love Dancin'	—	—	—	—	—
1995	Rhythms of Africa (with Bernie Krause)	—	—	—	—	—
1995	Rain Forest Dreams (with Bernie Krause)	—	—	—	—	—
1998	Ocean Odyssey (with Bernie Krause)	—	—	—	—	—
"—" denotes releases that did not chart. "x" denotes that chart did not exist at the time.

=== Singles ===
Year	Single	Peak chart positions					
Year	Single	BE (FLA)	CAN AC	NL	UK	US Dance	US R&B
1978	"I Like the Music Make It Hot"	—	—	—	—	—	—
1980	"The Groove"	30	—	31	7	27	41
1980	"In the Center"	—	—	—	—	—	91
1981	"Windy City"	—	—	—	—	—	89
1981	"The Theme from Hill Street Blues"	—	29	—	—	—	—
1982	"Enuff Is Enuff"	—	—	—	—	—	68
1983	"That's the Way I Feel 'Bout Your Love"	—	—	—	—	—	64
1984	"Stay On in the Groove"	—	—	—	—	—	72
1985	"Fiesta" (Promo)	—	—	—	—	—	—
1986	"Look What's Showing Through"	—	—	—	—	—	59
1986	"The Eagle and the Condor"	—	—	—	—	—	—
1987	"Bustin' Out"	—	—	—	—	—	—
1988	"Gotta Give It Up"	—	—	—	—	—	—
1988	"Stop to Love"	—	—	—	—	—	—
"—" denotes releases that did not chart.
