= Liquid Gold =

English disco group

- Origin: Brackley, England
- Genres: Disco, pop
- Years active: 1977–1984
- Label: Polo Records Ltd
- Past members: Ellie Hope; Ray Knott; Wally "Eddie" Rothe; Syd Twynham

Liquid Gold was an English disco group, from Brackley in Northamptonshire. Their biggest success came in 1980 with "Dance Yourself Dizzy", which peaked at number two on the UK chart.

== Career ==
Liquid Gold was formed by Ray Knott and Ellie Hope, who had met auditioning to play in Babe Ruth, a group that released four albums between 1972 and 1975. Both of them worked on the band's last album, Kid Stuff. Ellie Hope also had a modicum of previous success with her sisters in the soul group "Ellie" scoring a notable single "Tip of My Tongue" and also singing on Mud's hit single "Oh Boy". They then recruited Wally "Eddie" Rothe and Syd Twynham under the name Dream Coupe; after a few shows they signed to Creole Records, a Polo Records subsidiary, and changed their name to Liquid Gold.

Their first single, "Anyway You Do It", was released in October 1978. It narrowly missed the top 40 in the UK Singles Chart, peaking at No. 41, but resulted in their being transferred to Polo for their next release, "My Baby's Baby". A remixed version of the song was concurrently released by Parachute Records in the United States and became a hit, reaching No. 5 on the US Billboard Hot Dance Club Play chart, and No. 45 on the Billboard Hot 100 in 1979. Despite their success in the US, however, they never toured there.

At home, their next single was "Mr Groovy", which did not chart; it was quickly followed with "Dance Yourself Dizzy", which became their biggest UK hit, peaking at No. 2 on the UK chart in 1980. The song also reached No. 26 on the US Hot Dance Club Play chart. Their next single, "Substitute", peaked at No. 8 in the UK in the summer of 1980. Their final UK Top 40 entry was "The Night, the Wine, and the Roses", which hit No. 32 late in the year.

In March 1981, the single "Don't Panic" was released, and it was also entered into the Song For Europe contest to pick the UK's entry for the Eurovision Song Contest 1981, but was beaten by Bucks Fizz with "Making Your Mind Up", that year's eventual Eurovision winner. The following year saw the release of the singles "Where Did We Go Wrong" (UK No. 56) and "Turn the Tables". In 1983, Rothe quit the band, and Twynham left soon after, to join Les Gray's Mud. With the smaller line-up, they released two more singles before splitting up in 1984.

Most of their songs were produced, arranged, written, and engineered by Adrian Baker, who also played guitar.

"Synth and Strings", a 1999 UK chart hit by Yomanda, was based around a sample from "Dance Yourself Dizzy". In 2008, "Dance Yourself Dizzy" remixes were released on a 12" single with bonus CD, and digital download.

== Discography ==
=== Albums ===
- 1980: Liquid Gold (UK No. 34)

=== Singles ===
Year	Single	Chart positions								Certifications
Year	Single	BE (FLA)	IRE	NL 40	NL 100	UK	US	US Dance	US R&B	Certifications
1978	"Anyway You Do It"	17	—	27	30	41	—	—	—	
1979	"My Baby's Baby" (US and Canada-only release)	—	—	—	—	—	45	5	—	
1979	"Mr. Groovy (It Feels So Nice)"	—	—	—	—	—	—	—	—	
1980	"Dance Yourself Dizzy"	5	2	10	12	2	—	26	—	BPI: Silver
1980	"Substitute"	21	6	—	39	8	—	—	—	
1980	"The Night the Wine and the Roses"	—	30	—	—	32	—	—	—	
1981	"Don't Panic"	36	—	—	—	42	—	—	—	
1981	"One of Us Fell in Love"	—	—	—	—	—	—	—	—	
1982	"My Baby's Baby" (re-release)	—	—	—	—	—	—	—	—	
1982	"Where Did We Go Wrong"	—	—	—	45	56	—	—	—	
1983	"What's She Got"	—	—	—	—	—	86	23	52	
1984	"Turn the Tables"	—	—	—	—	—	—	—	—	
"—" denotes releases that did not chart or were not released in that territory.

== Personnel ==
- Ellie Hope – vocals
- Ray Knott – bass
- Wally "Eddie" Rothe – drums
- Syd Twynham – guitar
- Adrian Baker – guitar
- Miffy Smith – keyboards/synthesizers

Preceded by (United Kingdom) Maggie Moone	OGAE Second Chance Contest winner Retrospective; 1981	Succeeded by (Netherlands) The Millionaires
