= The Lambrettas =

English mod revival band

- Origin: Brighton, England
- Genres: Mod revival, power pop
- Years active: 1979–1982; 2009–present
- Label: The Rocket Record Company
- Members: Doug Sanders (guitar/vocals); Phil Edwards (guitar); Ant Wellman (bass); Paul Wincer (drums)
- Past members: Jez Bird (vocals - deceased); Mark Ellis (bass); Steve Bray (drums); Pat Freyne (drums)
- Website: Thelambrettas.co.uk

The Lambrettas are an English mod revival band, first active in the late 1970s and early 1980s. Named after the iconic Italian Lambretta scooter brand popular among Mods, the band was formed in Brighton, England. Their original line-up consisted of Jez Bird (singer/guitarist), Doug Sanders (guitarist/vocalist), Mark Ellis (bassist) and Paul Wincer (drummer).

Their biggest hit was in 1980, with a cover version of the 1950s Leiber and Stoller song "Poison Ivy", which reached No. 7 in the UK Singles Chart. They scored a No. 12 hit with the follow-up, "Da-a-a-nce". In the same year, they released the album Beat Boys in the Jet Age, which reached No. 28 on the UK Albums Chart, and scored another minor hit single, "Another Day (Another Girl)" (hastily renamed from "Page 3" after complaints from The Sun newspaper). After the mod revival faded, subsequent singles, which included a 1982 cover of Jefferson Airplane's "Somebody to Love", and a second album, 1981's Ambience, did not chart. The band played their final concert in their original incarnation in London on 14 April 1982. Bird re-formed the band for a time in the 1990s.

The band reformed in 2009 and toured the UK and Europe. A new EP, Go 4 It was released in February 2017 with three new tracks and a cover of The Kinks' song "All Day and All of the Night".

== History ==
=== Early years (1970s–1980) ===
Dressing in matching mohair suits, the band named themselves after one of the mod-favoured motor scooters. The Lambrettas played various gigs around England until they were finally spotted by Elton John's record label, The Rocket Record Company. At the time, Rocket was a new label featuring new and unknown acts. It was through this label that The Lambrettas released their first single, "Go Steady". The single did reasonably well and Rocket decided to sign the band to a longer-term contract.

=== Debut album ===
The band's next recording was a cover version of the 1950s song "Poison Ivy", which had been suggested to them by Pete Waterman, the business partner of their producer Peter Collins. The Lambrettas version had brass arrangements and a clear upbeat "poppy" feel to it. The single did well in the UK, reaching No. 7 on the UK Singles Chart. It earned the band a silver disc, for sales of over 250,000 copies, and it was to be the band's best selling single.

The next single, "D-a-a-ance", was more typical of the band's sound and it reached No. 12 on the chart. With three singles released, the band then released their debut album, Beat Boys In The Jet Age; however, controversy occurred when the band attempted to release their fourth single, “Page 3”. The newspaper The Sun objected to the reference to its Page Three pin-up girl feature and forced a change of title, necessitating the destruction of all the manufactured sleeves. The album did do reasonably well, however, and due to this the band secured a spot supporting Madness on their European tour.

=== Ambience and split ===
After the band's European tour, they released their second album, Ambience. It was during this period that Steve Bray (former drummer for Toyah Willcox) replaced Paul Wincer. However, despite the album's high level of production and general solid feel, it was not a success. The band had tried to reach larger audiences by toning down on their mod image.

Throughout 1981, singles were released from the second album but all failed to make a major impact with the British public. Steve Bray was replaced by Pat Freyne and the band continued their struggle. By 1982 it was decided that they would record another cover. Jefferson Airplane's song "Somebody to Love" was chosen. Despite attempts to gain popularity through radioplay, the single did not chart.

By mid-1982, hopes of success had faded and the band parted with their record label and each other. In 1985 a best of album was released entitled Kick Start.

=== Later work ===
Jez Bird re-formed the band in the 1990s, performing at small venues in England, and recording several demos for a new album that was never issued. In 1997 he re-recorded the band's hit "Da-a-ance". This featured on the compilation album, Generation to Generation, released on the Dr. Martens Records label. He subsequently recorded a new version of the theme from TV series Starsky & Hutch, which featured on the Cult Themes from the 70s Vol.1 album, released in 1997.

Jez Bird died of cancer on 27 August 2008, at the age of 50.

== Current line-up ==
Guitarist Doug Sanders and drummer Paul Wincer reunited to play a one-off gig as The Lambrettas at the "Modrophenia '79" event in Brighton on 15 August 2009, with Doug Sanders taking over vocal duties. Joining them were guitarist Philip Edwards and Chris Venzi-James on bass. The band were well received and what was supposed to be a one-off gig inaugurated a return to touring. The band have been touring the UK and Europe since then. Ant Wellman replaces Chris Venzi-James on bass guitar in 2015. A three-piece brass section is added to the band in 2015, adding an additional layer to the band's sound.

February 2017 saw the release of a new EP "Go 4 It" featuring three new songs on the Jet Age Records label.

- Doug Sanders – vocals, guitar
- Paul Wincer – drums
- Philip Edwards – guitar
- Ant Wellman – bass
- Richard Anstey - sax
- David Medland - trumpet
- Dan Rehahn - trombone

== Discography ==
=== Studio albums ===
Year	Album	UK
1980	Beat Boys in the Jet Age	28
1981	Ambience	—

=== Compilation albums ===
- Kick Start (1985)
- The Best of the Lambrettas - The Singles Collection (1995)
- The Definitive Collection (Beat Boys in the Jet Age) (1998)

=== Singles and EPs ===
Year	Song	UK
1979	"Go Steady"	—
1980	"Poison Ivy"	7
1980	"D-a-a-ance"	12
1980	"Another Day, Another Girl"	49
1981	"Good Times"	—
1981	"Anything You Want"	—
1981	"Decent Town"	—
1982	"Somebody to Love"	—
2017	Go 4 It (EP)	—
"—" denotes releases that did not chart.

== See also ==
- List of bands from England
- List of performances on Top of the Pops
