= The Groove (song) =

1980 single by Rodney Franklin

- Cover of the single released in the Netherlands

Single by Rodney Franklin

from the album You'll Never Know
- B-side: "God Bless the Blues"
- Released: April 1980
- Recorded: 1979
- Studio: Bear West, San Francisco, California
- Genre: Jazz-funk
- Length: 3:28 (single version); 4:48 (album version)
- Label: Columbia; CBS
- Songwriter: Rodney Franklin
- Producer: Paul Buckmaster

Rodney Franklin singles chronology
"I Like the Music Make It Hot" (1978)	"The Groove" (1980)	"In the Center" (1980)

"The Groove" is a song by American jazz pianist Rodney Franklin, released as a single in April 1980 from his second album You'll Never Know.

"The Groove" had the most success in the UK, peaking at number 7 on the singles chart, and even created its own dance craze there, called "The Freeze", started by disc jockey Chris Hill, in which due to the number of breaks in the song, dancers would freeze until the music started again.

== Track listings ==
7": Columbia / 1-11252

1. "The Groove" – 3:28
2. "God Bless the Blues" – 3:01

12": Columbia / 43-11300

1. "The Groove" – 4:48
2. "God Bless the Blues" – 6:22

12": CBS / S CBS 13 8529 (UK and Europe)

1. "The Groove" – 4:48
2. "God Bless the Blues" – 3:01

== Personnel ==
Musicians

- Rodney Franklin – piano
- Brooks Hunnicutt – vocals
- Lisa Roberts – vocals
- Phyllis St. James – vocals
- Vince Spaulding – electric guitar
- Harold Foreman – bass guitar
- Dean Holzkamp – flute, soprano saxophone
- Tony St. Junior – drums
- Kenneth Nash – percussion

Technical

- Paul Buckmaster – producer
- Rodney Franklin – associate producer
- George Butler – executive producer
- Mark Needham – recording engineer
- Don Hahn – remix engineer
- Bernie Grundman – mastering engineer

== Charts ==
Chart (1981)	Peak position
Belgium (Ultratop 50 Flanders)	30
Netherlands (Dutch Top 40)	19
Netherlands (Single Top 100)	30
UK Singles (Official Charts)	7
US Dance Club Songs (Billboard)	27
US Hot R&B/Hip-Hop Songs (Billboard)	41
