= Wanted (The Dooleys song) =

Single by The Dooleys

from the album The Best of The Dooleys
- Released: 1979
- Recorded: 1979
- Genre: Pop, Disco
- Songwriter(s): Findon\Myers\Puzey

"Wanted" is a 1979 song by English pop group The Dooleys. It was recorded in 1979 and reached No.3 in both the UK and Irish charts that summer, becoming the band's highest charting single in both countries. It was written by Findon\Myers\Puzey (who also wrote "I'm In the Mood for Dancing" by The Nolans) and was produced by Ben Findon. The label was GTO. The lead singers on this record were Kathy Dooley and Anne Dooley.

The single reached number 3 on the UK singles chart and remained in the chart for 14 weeks. In Ireland, it reached number 3 on the chart prepared by MCPS for IFPI. In Japan, the single reached number 12 on the Oricon Singles Chart and remained in the chart for 31 weeks. It also reached number 1 on the Oricon foreign singles chart and stayed there for 10 consecutive weeks. It reached number 8 on the Music Labo chart in 1979.

The song was re-recorded by Nicki French and Suzanna Dee for French's 2018 album Glitter to the Neon Lights.
