= Racey =

English pop group

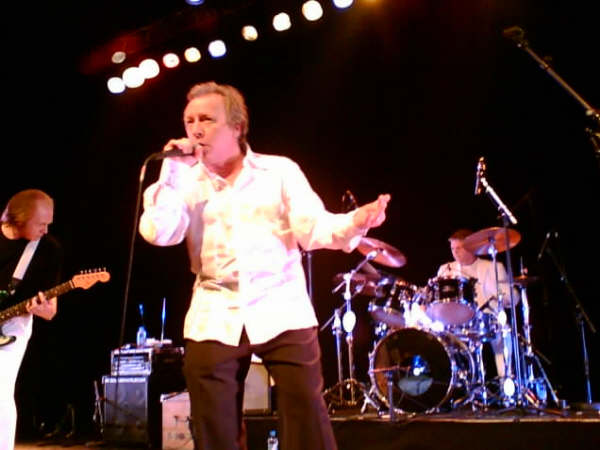
- Richard Gower, 2006

Background information
- Origin: Weston-super-Mare, Somerset, England
- Genres: Power pop; glam rock (before 1980); new wave
- Years active: 1976–1985 (original lineup); 1990–present (Racey); 1991–present (Racey featuring Richard Gower)
- Label: RAK Records
- Past members: Richard Gower; Phil Fursdon; Pete Miller (†2003); Steven Lawrence; Clive Wilson; Nigel "Woody" Woods
- Website: racey.org www.raceyweb.com/history.htm

Racey are an English pop/rock group, formed in 1976 in Weston-super-Mare, Somerset, England, by Clive Wilson and Phil Fursdon. They achieved success in the late 1970s and early 1980s, with hits such as "Lay Your Love on Me" and "Some Girls". Their 1979 song "Kitty" was an international hit in 1981 for Toni Basil when she reworked it into "Mickey".

== Career ==
The original line-up was Richard Gower (born 1955, Hackney, London, England; vocals, keyboards, piano, guitar), Phil Fursdon (guitar, vocals), Pete Miller (bass, vocals) and Clive Wilson (drums, percussion, vocals). After early success in their local pub circuit, they came to the attention of Mickie Most. Racey's first single, "Baby It's You", was penned by Smokie members Chris Norman and Pete Spencer, and released in 1978. Their second single, "Lay Your Love on Me", was the group's first hit single, peaking at No.3 in the UK Singles Chart in late 1978 through to early 1979. Their third single, "Some Girls", was also written by Mike Chapman and reached No.2 in the UK chart. ("Some Girls" was later recorded by Barry Manilow for his 1982 Here Comes the Night album.) In the U.S., Infinity Records released both "Lay Your Love On Me" (1978) and "Some Girls" (1979) but neither charted at all in U.S. Their only album Smash and Grab was never released in the U.S.

The only album they made with the original line-up was their 1979 debut Smash and Grab. The band's hits were either written and/or produced by Mike Chapman and Nicky Chinn. The band parted company with Chinn and Chapman after the album was released and, although they continued to play and tour, they released only a few more singles, which did not match their previous successes.

The band formally split in 1985.

In 1990, Racey reformed after Wilson and Fursdon were approached to play at a Fourth of July party. Miller died of cancer on 6 May 2003. In 1991, Richard Gower formed his own version of the group with Gary Combes, Steven Lawrence and Simon Ryland Both groups are still active and performing. Several albums and CDs, with re-recordings of the original hits as well as new material, are available from both of the present-day versions of the group.

In August 2021, the band released "It's a Glorious Day".

== Discography ==
=== Albums ===
==== Studio albums ====
| Title | Album details | Peak chart positions | | | | |
| Title | Album details | AUS | AUT | GER | NZ | SWE |
|---|---|---|---|---|---|---|
| Smash and Grab | Released: September 1979; Label: Rak; Formats: LP, MC | 5 | 15 | 29 | 10 | 32 |

==== Compilation albums ====
| Title | Album details |
|---|---|
| The Best of Racey | Released: August 1993; Label: EMI; Format: CD |
| Say Wow! (Greatest & Latest) | Released: 1996; Label: CMC; Format: CD; Denmark-only release |
| Lay Your Love on Me | Released: February 1996; Label: Disky; Format: CD; Europe-only release |
| Some Girls | Released: February 1998; Label: Wise Buy; Format: CD; Europe-only release |
| The Very Best Of | Released: 1998; Format: CD; Label: Go On Deluxe; Sweden-only release |
| Racey | Released: 1998; Label: Rem!nd; Format: CD; Netherlands-only release; Released in the UK in 2006 as The Best Of |
| Lay Your Love on Me | Released: 1999; Label: Digimode; Format: CD; Netherlands-only release |

=== Singles ===
| Title | Year | Peak chart positions | | | | | | | | | | | | Certification | Album |
| Title | Year | UK | AUS | AUT | BEL (FL) | DEN | GER | IRE | NL | NZ | SA | SWE | SWI | Certification | Album |
|---|---|---|---|---|---|---|---|---|---|---|---|---|---|---|---|
| "Baby It's You" | 1978 | — | — | — | — | — | — | — | — | — | — | — | — | | Non-album single |
| "Lay Your Love on Me" | 1978 | 3 | 1 | — | 3 | 4 | 14 | 2 | 2 | 1 | — | — | — | DEN: Silver | Smash and Grab |
| "Some Girls" | 1979 | 2 | 1 | 9 | 3 | 2 | 2 | 2 | 4 | 1 | 1 | 11 | 2 | DEN: Silver | Smash and Grab |
| "Boy Oh Boy" | 1979 | 22 | 12 | 3 | 14 | 1 | 3 | 9 | 24 | 12 | 2 | — | 2 | DEN: Silver | Smash and Grab |
| "Such a Night" | 1980 | — | 94 | — | — | 4 | 13 | — | 31 | — | — | — | — | | Smash and Grab |
| "Rest of My Life" | 1980 | — | 45 | — | — | 6 | 44 | — | — | — | — | — | — | | Non-album singles |
| "Runaround Sue" | 1980 | 13 | 91 | — | 4 | 7 | 36 | 9 | 13 | — | — | — | — | | Non-album singles |
| "Shame" | 1981 | — | — | — | 32 | — | 59 | — | — | — | — | — | — | | Non-album singles |
| "Little Darlin'" | 1981 | — | — | — | — | — | — | — | — | — | — | — | — | | Non-album singles |
| "There's a Party Going On" | 1981 | — | — | — | — | — | — | — | — | — | — | — | — | | Non-album singles |
| "Not Too Young to Get Married" | 1982 | — | — | — | — | — | — | — | — | — | — | — | — | | Non-album singles |
| "Little Girls Don't, But Big Girls Do" | 1992 | — | — | — | — | — | — | — | — | — | — | — | — | | Non-album singles |
| "Party On!" | 1992 | — | — | — | — | — | — | — | — | — | — | — | — | | Non-album singles |
| "Cry Cry Time" | 1996 | — | — | — | — | — | — | — | — | — | — | — | — | | Say Wow! (Greatest & Latest) |
| "It's a Glorious Day" | 2021 | — | — | — | — | — | — | — | — | — | — | — | — | | Non-album single |
"—" denotes releases that did not chart or were not released in that territory.
