= Poison Ivy (song) =

Single by the Coasters

from the album The Coasters' Greatest Hits
- B-side: "I'm a Hog for You"
- Released: August 1959
- Recorded: July 16, 1959
- Genre: Rock and roll
- Length: 2:43
- Label: Atco
- Songwriter: Jerry Leiber and Mike Stoller

The Coasters singles chronology
| "Along Came Jones" (1959) | "Poison Ivy" (1959) | "What About Us" (1959) |

Official audio
- "Poison Ivy" (2007 Remaster) on YouTube

"Poison Ivy" is a popular song by American songwriting duo Jerry Leiber and Mike Stoller. It was originally recorded by the Coasters in 1959. It went to No.1 on the R&B chart, No.7 on the Billboard Hot 100 chart, and No.15 in the UK. This was their third top-ten hit of that year following "Charlie Brown" and "Along Came Jones".

== Composition ==
=== Lyrics ===
The song discusses a girl known as "Poison Ivy". She is compared to measles, mumps, chickenpox, the common cold, and whooping cough, but is deemed worse, because "Poison Ivy, Lord, will make you itch". According to lyricist Jerry Leiber, "Pure and simple, 'Poison Ivy' is a metaphor for a sexually transmitted disease". The song also makes references to other flowers such as a rose and a daisy.

== Notable cover versions ==
- Billy Thorpe and the Aztecs – Australia number 1 in 1964. It famously kept the Beatles from the number 1 spot on the Sydney charts at the very moment that the group was making its first and only tour of Australia—a feat which resulted in Thorpe being invited to meet the Fab Four at their hotel.
- The Rolling Stones - In January 1964 they released the single "You Better Move On" which had "Poison Ivy" has the B-side.
- The Lambrettas – 1980. They reached number 7 in the British charts.
- Golden Boys – in Portuguese, as "Erva Venenosa", in 1965, with the version's lyrics portraying an evil woman. Covered by Brazilian pop band Herva Doce in 1982, and Rita Lee on her album 3001 in 2000.
