= Some Girls (Racey song) =

- Single cover

Single by Racey

from the album Smash and Grab
- B-side: "Fighting Chance"
- Released: 1979
- Genre: Glam rock
- Length: 3:23
- Label: RAK
- Songwriter(s): Nicky Chinn, Mike Chapman
- Producer(s): Mickie Most

Racey singles chronology
| "Lay Your Love on Me" (1978) | "Some Girls" (1979) | "Boy Oh Boy" (1979) |

"Some Girls" is a song by the British pop band Racey. The song was written by Nicky Chinn and Mike Chapman, produced by Mickie Most, and released in 1979 on the RAK label as their third single.

The song was a big hit for Racey in Britain and Ireland, reaching number two in both countries; in Australia, New Zealand and South Africa, it reached number one.

== Charts ==
=== Weekly charts ===
| Chart (1979) | Peak position |
|---|---|
| Australian (Kent Music Report)| | 1 |
| Austria (Ö3 Austria Top 40) | 9 |
| Belgium (Ultratop 50 Flanders) | 3 |
| Netherlands (Dutch Top 40) | 3 |
| Netherlands (Single Top 100) | 4 |
| New Zealand (Recorded Music NZ) | 1 |
| Sweden (Sverigetopplistan) | 11 |
| Switzerland (Schweizer Hitparade) | 2 |
| UK Singles (OCC) | 2 |
| West Germany (GfK) | 2 |

=== Year-end charts ===
| Chart (1979) | Position |
|---|---|
| Australia (Kent Music Report) | 4 |
| Belgium (Ultratop Flanders) | 30 |
| Netherlands (Dutch Top 40) | 32 |
| Netherlands (Single Top 100) | 22 |
| Switzerland (Schweizer Hitparade) | 20 |
| West Germany (Official German Charts) | 10 |

== Certifications ==
| Region | Certification | Certified units/sales |
|---|---|---|
| Denmark (IFPI Danmark) | Silver | |
| United Kingdom (BPI) | Gold | 500,000^{^} |
^{^} Shipments figures based on certification alone.
