= Fiddler's Dram =

British folk band

Fiddler's Dram were a British folk band of the late 1970s, most widely known for their 1979 hit single, "Day Trip to Bangor (Didn't We Have a Lovely Time)", which reached no. 3 on the UK Singles Chart.

== Band members ==
The full-time members of Fiddler's Dram, drawn from the Oyster Ceilidh Band, were:

- Cathy Lesurf – Lead Vocals, Bodhrán
- Alan Prosser (born: 17th April, 1951) – Backing Vocals, Guitar, Violin, Bowed psaltery, Bones
- Chris Taylor (born: 27th November, 1946) – Backing Vocals, Tenor Banjo, Bouzouki, Harmonica, Appalachian Dulcimer, Mandola
- Ian Telfer (born: 28th May, 1948) – Violin, Bowed psaltery, Viola, English Concertina
- Will Ward – Bassoon, Recorder, Crumhorn

== Career ==
Dave Arbus, violinist with East of Eden, was a founding member but left long before the band achieved success.

The full-time members of the band were drawn from a group of musicians at the University of Kent at Canterbury and members of Duke's Folk Club in Whitstable. Jam sessions in a Canterbury squat often took place, with additional club members given the opportunity to take part and sometimes at local performances. The band had an enthusiastic local following and played regularly at local clubs and bars in and around the Canterbury area, with the open nature of the band's ever-changing part-time line-up contributing to its popularity. With other club members, including John Jones and Ian Kearey, the full-time members of the band formed the Oyster Ceilidh Band in about 1976, with Cathy Lesurf singing, and later assuming the role of caller at dances.

The first Fiddler's Dram album, To See the Play, was released on the Dingle's label in 1978. It featured acoustic arrangements of mainly British traditional songs and tunes, but also included live favourite "Day Trip to Bangor", written by Whitstable Folk Club regular Debbie Cook. David Foister of Dingle's suggested that the track be released as a single. It was re-recorded at a faster tempo than on the original LP, and with the acoustic instruments augmented by other instruments including bass guitar, synthesiser and drums.

It has been claimed that "Day Trip to Bangor" was actually inspired by a day trip to Rhyl, a seaside resort 35 miles east of Bangor, North Wales, but Bangor had an extra syllable and slipped off the tongue more easily, so it was used instead of Rhyl. It allegedly caused an outcry from councillors and businesses in Rhyl, who complained that the publicity would have boosted the resort's tourist economy. Songwriter Cook has unconditionally denied this, however. Interviewed for the BBC Radio 4 documentary, broadcast on 29 September 2011, Cook said the song was "absolutely yes" about the Bangor in Wales. She said: "I was so ignorant at the time that I didn't know that any other Bangor existed, so it was categorically this Bangor, and it was Bangor because it scanned and for no other reason than that. And it was the only place I knew along the north Wales coast." In the documentary, when interviewer Jonathan Maitland reminded Cook that there was a furore about the song really being about Rhyl, Cook laughed and called it "a great piece of nonsense".

The single reached a peak of number 3 in the UK Singles Chart in January 1980, having been released the previous month.

A version of the song, with altered lyrics, was used the following year in a TV commercial for Anchor butter. The band received no royalties for this, and the story was featured on the BBC TV series That's Life!.

Songwriter Cook subsequently went on to write scripts for The Archers and EastEnders.

Will Ward had joined the Oyster Ceilidh Band by 1978, and became the fifth member of Fiddler's Dram on their eponymous second LP, recorded hurriedly to follow up on their unexpected success in the UK Singles Chart. The band were unable to achieve subsequent success, however. In the words of Ian Telfer, "Day Trip to Bangor" was "the kind of success you don't easily recover from. Fiddler's Dram did one more tour then gratefully took the money (and the gold discs) and ran".

The Oyster Ceilidh Band continued as both a dance and concert band, however, changing their name to The Oyster Band in around 1982 and, later, to just Oysterband. Cathy Lesurf subsequently left the Oysters for a spell with the Albion Band.

On 10 April 2006, banjoist Chris Taylor appeared in the line-up on Never Mind the Buzzcocks (episode 5 series 18).

In 2009, Lesurf released a Christmas single called "Christmas Time". She said she hoped it would be a hit so it would be a "companion" for "Day Trip to Bangor".

== Discography ==
=== Studio albums ===
- To See the Play (Dingle's Records, 1978)
- Fiddler's Dram (Dingle's Records, 1980) - AUS #80

=== Singles ===
Year	Song	UK
1979	"Day Trip to Bangor (Didn't We Have a Lovely Time)"	3
1980	"Beercart Lane (Dancing in the Moonlight)"	—
1981	"Black Hole"	—
1981	"Sweet Chiming Bells"	—
"—" denotes releases that did not chart.
