= Lay Your Love on Me =

- Single cover

Single by Racey

from the album Smash and Grab
- B-side: "I Believed You"
- Released: 1978
- Genre: Pop
- Length: 3:16
- Label: RAK
- Songwriters: Nicky Chinn, Mike Chapman
- Producer: Mickie Most

Racey singles chronology
"Baby It's You" (1977)	"Lay Your Love on Me" (1978)	"Some Girls" (1979)

"Lay Your Love on Me" is a song by the British pop band Racey. The song was written by Nicky Chinn and Mike Chapman, produced by Mickie Most and released in 1978 on the RAK label as the group's second single. It was their first hit single, reaching No. 3 on the UK Singles Chart and No. 2 in Ireland in December 1978. It was a No. 1 hit in the Netherlands, Australia and New Zealand later that same year.

Kikki Danielsson covered the song on her 1979 album, Rock'n Yodel.

== Charts ==
=== Weekly charts ===
Chart (1978–1979)	Peak position
Australian (Kent Music Report)|	1
Belgium (Ultratop 50 Flanders)	3
Netherlands (Dutch Top 40)	1
Netherlands (Single Top 100)	2
New Zealand (Recorded Music NZ)	1
UK Singles (OCC)	3
West Germany (GfK)	14

=== Year-end charts ===
Chart (1979)	Position
Australia (Kent Music Report)	1
Belgium (Ultratop Flanders)	13
Netherlands (Dutch Top 40)	6
Netherlands (Single Top 100)	7

== Certifications ==
Region	Certification	Certified units/sales
Denmark (IFPI Danmark)	Silver	
Netherlands (NVPI)	Gold	100,000^{^}
United Kingdom (BPI)	Gold	500,000^{^}
^{^} Shipments figures based on certification alone.
