= Chris Norman discography =

- Studio albums: 24
- Live albums: 3
- Compilation albums: 21
- Singles: 54

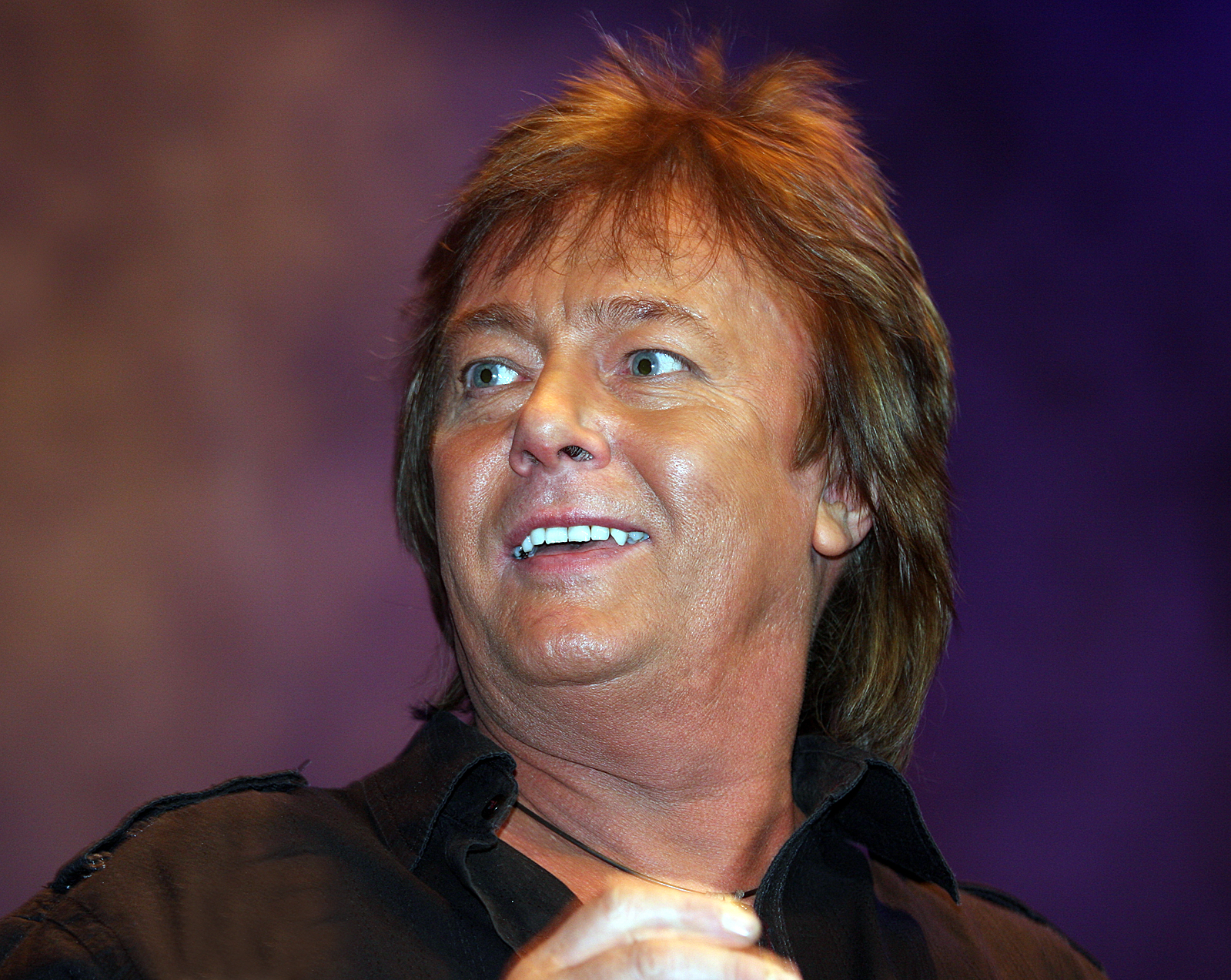

This is the discography of British soft rock singer Chris Norman as a solo artist.

== Albums ==
=== Studio albums ===
Year	Title	Details	Peak chart positions				
Year	Title	Details	AUT	DEN	GER	NOR	SWI
1982	Rock Away Your Teardrops	Released: September 1982; Label: Repertoire; Formats: LP; Germany-only release	—	—	—	—	—
1986	Some Hearts Are Diamonds	Released: October 1986; Label: Hansa; Formats: CD, LP, MC	22	—	14	9	9
1987	Different Shades	Released: 1987; Label: Hansa; Formats: CD, LP, MC	—	—	—	—	—
1989	Break the Ice	Released: 1989; Label: Polydor; Formats: CD, LP, MC	—	—	—	—	—
1991	Interchange	Released: November 1991; Label: Polydor; Formats: CD, LP, MC	—	—	—	—	—
1992	The Growing Years	Released: December 1992; Label: Polydor; Formats: CD, MC	—	—	—	—	—
1994	The Album	Released: 24 May 1994; Label: Polydor; Formats: CD, MC	—	—	—	—	—
1995	Reflections	Released: September 1995; Label: Bud Music, Play That Beat!; Formats: CD, MC	—	—	—	—	—
1997	Into the Night	Released: 2 June 1997; Label: Intercord; Formats: CD	—	—	—	—	—
1997	Christmas Together	Released: 1 December 1997; Label: Microphone; Formats: CD, MC; With the Riga Dom Boys Choir; Latvia-only release	—	—	—	—	—
2000	Full Circle	Released: February 2000; Label: Bros Music; Formats: CD, MC	—	—	32	—	—
2001	Breathe Me In	Released: 15 October 2001; Label: Coconut; Formats: CD, MC	—	—	—	—	—
2003	Handmade	Released: 14 July 2003; Label: Sanctuary; Formats: CD, MC	—	—	—	—	—
2004	Break Away	Released: 3 May 2004; Label: Polydor; Formats: CD	52	—	27	—	76
2006	Million Miles	Released: 13 January 2006; Label: Charm; Formats: CD	—	—	63	—	—
2007	Close Up	Released: 5 October 2007; Label: Edel; Formats: CD	—	—	94	—	—
2011	Time Traveller	Released: 7 February 2011; Label: Black Pelican, Membran; Formats: CD	—	8	96	—	—
2013	There and Back	Released: 13 September 2013; Label: Solo Sound; Formats: CD, digital download	—	—	62	—	—
2015	Crossover	Released: 18 September 2015; Label: Solo Sound; Formats: CD, digital download	—	—	56	—	—
2017	Don't Knock the Rock	Released: 15 September 2017; Label: Solo Sound; Formats: CD	—	—	—	—	—
2021	Just a Man	Released: 3 December 2021; Label: K-Musix; Formats: CD	—	—	76	—	—
2022	Rediscovered Love Songs	Released: November 2022; Label: Music Manager; Formats: CD	—	—	65	—	—
2024	Junction 55	Released: 9 February 2024; Label: Music Manager; Formats: CD, digital download	—	—	46	—	—
2026	Lifelines	Released: 13 March 2026; Label: Stars by Edel; Formats: CD, digital download	6	—	6	—	23
"—" denotes releases that did not chart or were not released in that territory.

=== Live albums ===
Year	Title	Details	Peak chart positions	
Year	Title	Details	DEN	GER
2005	One Acoustic Evening	Released: 25 April 2005; Label: e-m-s; Formats: 2×CD	—	82
2009	The Hits! Tour	Released: 23 December 2009; Label: Black Pelican/Warner; Formats: DVD+2×CD; Denmark-only release	30	—
2018	Don't Knock the Rock Tour – Live Hamburg 2018	Released: 10 August 2018; Label: Solo Sound; Formats: 2×CD+DVD	—	61
"—" denotes releases that did not chart or were not released in that territory.

=== Compilation albums ===
Year	Title	Details	Peak chart positions				
Year	Title	Details	AUT	DEN	GER	NOR	SWE
1988	Hits from the Heart	Released: 18 April 1988; Label: Hansa; Formats: CD, LP, MC	—	—	13	—	—
1989	Hearts on Fire	Released: 1989; Label: Karussell; Formats: CD, MC; Germany-only release	—	—	—	—	—
1993	Golden Stars – Golden Hits	Released: 20 July 1993; Label: Spectrum; Formats: CD, MC; Germany-only release	—	—	—	—	—
1993	Jealous Heart	Released: 26 July 1993; Label: Dice Music; Formats: CD; UK-only release	—	—	—	—	—
1994	Screaming Love Album	Released: 1994; Label: Dice Music; Formats: CD; UK-only release	—	—	—	—	—
1995	I Need Your Love	Released: 9 March 1995; Label: Spectrum; Formats: CD	—	—	—	—	—
1995	The Best of 20 Years	Released: 3 July 1995; Label: Ariola/BMG; Formats: CD, MC; With Smokie	—	—	—	—	—
1995	Stay with Me Tonight	Released: 15 August 1995; Label: Spectrum; Formats: CD	—	—	—	—	—
1996	The Very Best Of	Released: 1996; Label: Go On Deluxe; Formats: CD; UK-only release	—	—	—	—	—
2001	The Collection	Released: February 2001; Label: Music Digital; Formats: CD	—	—	—	—	—
2001	Chris Norman	Released: 16 October 2001; Label: Music Digital; Formats: 3×CD	—	—	—	—	—
2003	Greatest Hits	Released: 30 June 2003; Label: Bros Music; Formats: CD, MC	—	—	—	—	—
2004	Heartbreaking Hits	Released: 5 April 2004; Label: Edel; Formats: 2×CD, 2×MC	—	—	—	—	—
2004	The Very Best Of	Released: 5 April 2004; Label: Bros Music; Formats: CD	3	—	47	—	—
2004	The Very Best Of – Part II	Released: 29 November 2004; Label: Sign It!; Formats: 2×CD	—	—	—	—	—
2005	My Best Songs	Released: 30 December 2005; Label: Sony BMG; Formats: CD	—	—	—	—	—
2006	Coming Home	Released: 9 October 2006; Label: Charm; Formats: CD	—	—	—	—	—
2008	The Complete Story of Chris Norman	Released: 24 November 2008; Label: SPV GmbH; Formats: 5×CD box set	—	—	—	—	—
2009	The Hits! From His Smokie and Solo Years	Released: 13 February 2009; Label: Edel; Formats: 2×CD	—	2	47	7	12
2018	Definitive Collection – Smokie and Solo Years	Released: 30 November 2018; Label: Edel; Formats: 2×CD, digital download	—	—	—	—	—
2021	Baby I Miss You	Released: 5 March 2021; Label: Bros Music; Formats: CD, LP, digital download	—	—	—	—	—
"—" denotes releases that did not chart or were not released in that territory.

== Singles ==
Year	Title	Peak chart positions										Album
Year	Title	AUS	AUT	BEL (FL)	DEN	GER	NL	NZ	SWI	UK	US	Album
1978	"Stumblin' In" (with Suzi Quatro)	2	6	3	1	2	3	2	7	41	4	If You Knew Suzi...
1982	"Hey Baby"	—	—	—	—	—	—	—	—	—	—	Rock Away Your Teardrops
1984	"Love Is a Battlefield"	—	—	—	—	—	—	—	—	151	—	Non-album singles
1984	"My Girl and Me"	—	—	—	—	—	—	—	—	—	—	Non-album singles
1986	"Midnight Lady"	—	1	16	12	1	9	—	1	—	—	Some Hearts Are Diamonds
1986	"Some Hearts Are Diamonds"	—	7	—	—	14	—	—	12	—	—	Some Hearts Are Diamonds
1986	"No Arms Can Ever Hold You"	—	—	—	—	52	—	—	—	—	—	Some Hearts Are Diamonds
1987	"Sarah (You Take My Breath Away)"	—	—	—	—	46	—	—	—	—	—	Different Shades
1988	"Ordinary Heart"	—	—	—	—	—	—	—	—	—	—	Different Shades
1988	"I Want to Be Needed" (with Shari Belafonte)	—	—	—	—	63	—	—	—	—	—	Hits from the Heart
1988	"Broken Heroes"	—	7	—	—	3	—	—	—	—	—	Hits from the Heart
1988	"Wings of Love"	—	—	—	—	—	—	—	—	—	—	Different Shades
1989	"Back Again"	—	—	—	—	—	—	—	—	—	—	Break the Ice
1989	"Keep the Candle Burning"	—	—	—	—	—	—	—	—	—	—	WWF Project El Dorado – Saving the Tropical Rainforest
1990	"The Night Has Turned Cold"	—	—	—	—	—	—	—	—	—	—	Non-album single
1991	"If You Need My Love Tonight"	—	—	—	—	84	—	—	—	—	—	Interchange
1992	"I Need Your Love" (with Suzi Quatro)	—	—	—	—	—	—	—	—	—	—	The Growing Years
1992	"Goodbye Lady Blue"	—	—	—	—	—	—	—	—	—	—	The Growing Years
1993	"Come Together"	—	—	—	—	—	—	—	—	—	—	Non-album single
1993	"Jealous Heart"	—	—	—	—	—	—	—	—	—	—	Jealous Heart
1993	"The Growing Years"	—	—	—	—	—	—	—	—	—	—	Jealous Heart
1994	"As Good as It Gets"	—	—	—	—	—	—	—	—	—	—	The Album
1994	"Red Hot Screaming Love"	—	—	—	—	—	—	—	—	—	—	The Album
1994	"I Need Your Love" (solo version)	—	—	—	—	—	—	—	—	—	—	Jealous Heart
1994	"Wild Wild Angel"	—	—	—	—	—	—	—	—	—	—	Non-album single
1995	"Obsession"	—	—	—	—	—	—	—	—	—	—	Reflections
1995	"Reflections of My Life"	—	—	—	—	—	—	—	—	—	—	Reflections
1996	"Under Your Spell"	—	—	—	—	—	—	—	—	—	—	Reflections
1996	"Fearless Hearts"	—	—	—	—	—	—	—	—	—	—	Alarmcode 112 soundtrack
1997	"Baby I Miss You"	—	—	—	—	—	—	—	—	—	—	Into the Night
1997	"Into the Night"	—	—	—	—	—	—	—	—	—	—	Into the Night
1997	"Christmas Together" (with the Riga Dom Boys Choir)	—	—	—	—	—	—	—	—	—	—	Christmas Together
1999	"Oh Carol"	—	—	—	—	—	—	—	—	—	—	Full Circle
2000	"Mexican Girl"	—	—	—	—	—	—	—	—	—	—	Full Circle
2001	"When the Indians Cry" (promo-only release)	—	—	—	—	—	—	—	—	—	—	Breathe Me In
2002	"Ich mach' meine Augen zu (Everytime)" (with Nino de Angelo)	—	8	—	—	59	—	—	—	—	—	Breathe Me In
2003	"Keep Talking"	—	—	—	—	—	—	—	—	—	—	Handmade
2004	"Only You"	—	—	—	—	—	—	—	—	—	—	Handmade
2004	"Amazing"	—	15	—	—	9	—	—	48	—	—	Break Away
2004	"For You"	—	59	—	—	52	—	—	—	—	—	The Very Best Of
2004	"Too Much (And Not Enough)"/"Without Your Love"	—	—	—	—	—	—	—	—	—	—	Break Away
2006	"Without Your Love" (promo-only release)	—	—	—	—	—	—	—	—	—	—	Coming Home
2007	"Right Time, Wrong Place" (promo-only release)	—	—	—	—	—	—	—	—	—	—	Million Miles
2009	"Endless Night"	—	—	—	—	—	—	—	—	—	—	The Hits! Tour
2011	"Chasing Cars" (promo-only release)	—	—	—	—	—	—	—	—	—	—	Time Traveller
2013	"Gypsy Queen"	—	—	—	—	—	—	—	—	—	—	There and Back
2013	"Lovers and Friends" (promo-only release)	—	—	—	—	—	—	—	—	—	—	There and Back
2014	"Another Night in Nashville" (with C. C. Catch)	—	—	—	—	—	—	—	—	—	—	Non-album single
2015	"Waiting"	—	—	—	—	—	—	—	—	—	—	Crossover
2015	"That's Christmas"	—	—	—	—	—	—	—	—	—	—	Non-album single
2017	"Sun Is Rising"	—	—	—	—	—	—	—	—	—	—	Don't Knock the Rock
2017	"Crawling Up the Wall"	—	—	—	—	—	—	—	—	—	—	Don't Knock the Rock
2017	"You Are the Light	—	—	—	—	—	—	—	—	—	—	Don't Knock the Rock
2021	"Baby I Miss You" (new version)	—	—	—	—	—	—	—	—	—	—	Baby I Miss You
"—" denotes releases that did not chart or were not released in that territory.
