= Alexandra Castillo =

Chilean-Canadian actress, dancer (born 1971)

Alex Castillo
- Born: Alexandra Cecilia Castillo-Smith; 14 June 1971 (age 55); Santiago, Chile
- Occupations: Actress, dancer
- Years active: 1997–present

Alexandra Castillo (born 14 June 1971) is a Chilean-Canadian actress and dancer, known for her roles on both Canadian and American television. She has been credited, in almost equal distribution throughout her career, as Alex Castillo.

== Life and career ==
Castillo was born in Santiago, Chile as Alexandra Cecilia Castillo-Smith. As a child, her family moved to Toronto, where she was raised. She got her start on stage through dance, having studied both ballet and flamenco from childhood. Through high school and university, she did theatre and commercials. After completing a master's degree in Latin American studies. As of late 1990s, Castillo appeared in several television series and films. She made her television debut in 1999 appearing in an episodes of television series Dead Man's Gun and Seven Days, and the following year played a minor role in the science fiction action film The 6th Day.

Castillo made guest-starring appearances in more than 50 television series, include The Dead Zone, Missing, The Eleventh Hour, Degrassi: The Next Generation, The Border, Heartland, Fringe,The Listener, Warehouse 13, Murdoch Mysteries, Rookie Blue, Saving Hope, Designated Survivor, The Expanse, The Handmaid's Tale and The Boys. She starred in Guidestones, a Canadian award-winning web series from 2012 to 2014. In 2004 she had the recurring role during the first season of CBC legal drama series, This Is Wonderland. In film she appeared in Traitor (2008), 2012 (2009) and Miss Sloane (2016), and as well appeared in a made-for-television movies Miracle on the 17th Green (1999), The Wool Cap (2004), Plague City: SARS in Toronto (2005), The Path to 9/11 (2006), Eye of the Beast (2007), Taken in Broad Daylight (2009) and Believe Me: The Abduction of Lisa McVey (2018).

In 2013, Castillo starred as a series regular on the short-lived ABC drama series, Lucky 7. In 2016 she had recurring role in the Starz drama series, The Girlfriend Experience and from 2017 to 2018 starred in the Global drama series Mary Kills People. In 2020 she starred as Chancellor Diara in the Hulu science fiction series, Utopia Falls and had recurring role in the Netflix teen drama Grand Army. In 2021 she had recurring role in the CW series Legends of Tomorrow as Gloria Cruz and the following year co-starred in the Apple TV+ miniseries Five Days at Memorial. In 2023 she had recurring roles in the Paramount+ thriller Rabbit Hole and the AMC science fiction series Orphan Black: Echoes.

== Partial filmography ==
‡ denotes credited as Alex Castillo

Year	Title	Role	Notes
2003	Mutant X	Gina	Episode: "The Breed"
2004	Missing	Rita Brinden	‡ Episode: "Lost Sister"
2004	This Is Wonderland	Larissa Munoz	‡ Recurring role (season 1)
2004	The Wool Cap		‡ TV movie
2004	The Eleventh Hour	Sister Beatriz	Episode: "Megan Ice Cream"
2005	Kevin Hill	Mariel Arden	‡ Episode: "Homeland Insecurity"
2005	Degrassi: The Next Generation	Nurse Davies	Episode: "Moonlight Desires"
2005	Kojak	NYPD Lazzerio	2 episodes
2005	Plague City: SARS in Toronto	Aline	‡ TV movie
2005–2006	Jeff Ltd.	Constanble Seagram	2 episodes
2006	Naked Josh	Dawn Joyce	Episode: "Pistols at Dawn"
2006	The Path of 9/11	Monica Smith	‡ Miniseries, main cast
2007	Eye of the Beast	Katrina Tomas	TV movie
2007	72 Hours: True Crime	Girlfriend	Episode: "Bull's Eye"
2008	Sold	Zeze	TV movie
2008	Tomboy	Mom	Short film
2008	The Border	Araceli	‡ Episode: "Normalizing Relations"
2008	Traitor	Dark Haired Woman	‡ Feature film
2009	Taken In Broad Daylight	Agent Reynolds	‡ TV movie
2009	2012	Paris Reporter	Feature film
2010	Ninety-one	Vivian	Short film
2016	Miss Sloane	Pru West	‡ Feature film
2016	11.22.63	Mayor	Episode: "The Day in Question"
2020	Utopia Falls	Chancellor Diara	Feature film
2021	Legends of Tomorrow	Gloria Cruz	4 episodes
2022	Reacher	Professor Castillo	‡ Episode: "Papier"
2023	Gen V	Vanessa	‡ Episode: "God U."
2023	Orphan Black: Echoes	Neva	‡ Recurring role
2024	Sharp Corner	Tamara Jones-Reed	Feature film
2024	Head Over Heels	Delaney Diaz	Television film
2025	Untamed	Lana	‡ 2 episodes
2026	Yellowjackets	Maria Martinez	1 episode
