= Maneater (2007 film) =

2007 horror film directed by Gary Yates

- DVD cover
- Genre: Horror
- Based on: Eye of the Beast
- Written by: Philip Morton
- Directed by: Gary Yates
- Starring: Gary Busey; Ty Wood; Ian D. Clark
- Theme music composer: Glenn Buhr
- Country of origin: United States
- Original language: English

Production
- Producer: Phyllis Laing
- Cinematography: Peter Benison
- Editor: Jeff Warren
- Running time: 88 minutes

Original release
- Network: Movie Central On Demand
- Release: 2007
- Network: Sci Fi Channel
- Release: September 8, 2007

Maneater is a 2007 American television natural horror film directed by Gary Yates and produced by RHI Entertainment, starring Gary Busey, Ty Wood, and Ian D. Clark. The film aired on various video on demand channels, before officially premiering in the United States on the Syfy Channel on September 8, 2007. Filmed in Winnipeg, Manitoba, Canada, the film is produced under an agreement with Syfy. Based on Jack Warner's novel Shikar, the film details the killing spree of an escaped Bengal tiger after it gets loose in a small town along the Appalachian Trail. Trying to stop it are Sheriff Barnes (Busey) and big game hunter Colonel Graham (Clark), while a young boy named Roy (Wood), who has a strange connection to the tiger, tries to save it. It is the fourth film in the Maneater film series.

Maneater is one of the few films in the series to break the standard formula of Syfy natural horror films with its use of a normal, living tiger rather than a CG animal or excusing its behavior by having it be a mutant or genetically altered. Critics panned the film citing substandard acting, heavy use of stereotypical characters, a hole-filled plot, unused subplots, and the use of a live tiger resulting in almost all attacks being implied rather than seen.

== Plot ==
Two people disappear along the Appalachian Trail: a young man jogging with his girlfriend and a hermit who rarely leaves his home. Sheriff Grady Barnes finds a trail that leads him to parts of the hermit's body. That night, young Roy Satterly is reading by flashlight when a Bengal tiger briefly appears in front of his bedroom window. In the morning, his mother, Rose, finds him sleepwalking in the woods in front of their house. A cast taken at the next victim's scene points to a tiger as the hermit's killer, so Sheriff Barnes holds a press conference to warn the public. The Bengal tiger revisits Roy's home that night.

A tabloid paper offers a $10,000 reward for the tiger causing hunters and reporters to inundate the town. The sheriff forbids anyone from going into the woods and hunting the tiger, but while out with Deputy Sharon Weinman, he sees Roy in the woods. They give chase but instead find a dead tabloid reporter. The National Guard arrives to help. The sheriff later sees Roy in the woods again and warns him to stay out before taking him home and giving Rose the same warning. After he leaves, she mistakenly believes Roy told the sheriff lies about there being a tiger and chastises him.

Six National Guardsmen arrive, led by Sergeant Winshiser, as does Colonel James Livingston-Graham, an experienced big game hunter and tracker from England. Sergeant Winshiser and his men arrogantly refuse to use the sheriff's advice and help. Graham tells the sheriff the soldiers will fail due to their arrogance and that he will start his hunt for the tiger when they finish. When the guardsmen search for the tiger, it kills one, Timmons, silently. Graham appears and explains how the tiger did it and helps them find the body. Later, Deputy Weinman and Deputy Ezra Hundt, the mayor's son, find one of the National Guard trucks sitting empty on the road. They investigate, and Weinman tells Hundt to call their position to headquarters. She finds that the tiger attacked the two guardsmen, with one killed and the other shot by his partner. Hearing Hundt blowing the patrol car horn, she runs back to the car, but the tiger has already killed him.

Meanwhile, Roy encounters Graham in the woods. When Roy asks if Graham is going to kill the tiger, Graham tells him that he must because it cannot choose not to hunt whatever is around it, including people. They shake hands and part ways, with Graham continuing to the scene of the National Guard attack. He explains how the tiger attacked the guardsmen and deputy when he arrives.

Later, at another press conference, a reporter reveals Graham was exiled from India, his former home, after failing to kill a tiger that slaughtered over 200 people. The sheriff visits Graham that night, and he explains the situation was beyond his control. Later that night, Roy dreams the tiger killed Graham and runs to his tent to check on him. Graham offers to walk him home, but they end up going to the store where Rose works when Roy says she is working late.

When they arrive, the tiger attacks and kills her. They run into the store but are separated. Graham calls for Roy, but the tiger gets into the building and attacks him. Graham barely fails to kill the tiger with both shots he fires. Sheriff Barnes arrives after the break-in alarm sounds and is chased into the store by the tiger. He finds Graham's hat and a blood trail and tries to find him before hearing Roy calling out from under a truck outside. The sheriff dives under the truck and shields the boy as the tiger attempts to attack. When the tiger jumps into the truck's bed, they run to the sheriff's truck. The sheriff shoots at the tiger but hits a gasoline tank causing it to explode and kill the tiger. Graham appears beside the building, bloody but alive. Deciding his hunting days are over, Graham returns home. Sheriff Barnes and his wife adopt the orphaned Roy.

== Cast ==
- Gary Busey as Sheriff Grady Barnes
- Ian D. Clark as Colonel James Livingston Graham
- Ty Wood as Roy Satterly
- Diana Reis as Mary Barnes
- Marina Stephenson Kerr as Rose Satterly
- Sarah Constible as Deputy Sharon Weinman
- Blake Taylor as Mayor Earl Hunt
- Kristen Harris as Kathy Kurick
- Jessica Burleson as Eleanor
- Aleks Paunovic as Sergeant Winshiser

== Production ==
In October 2006, RHI Entertainment made a deal with the Sci Fi Channel to produce a series of ten made-for-television natural horror films to air on the network the following year. Though the film series was dubbed "Maneater" by RHI Entertainment, the actual Maneater film is the third in the series. Although the agreement called for the films to premiere on Sci Fi, the first six films in the series actually premiered on various video on demand channels months ahead of their Sci Fi airings.

Based on Jack Warner's 2003 debut novel Shikar, Maneater was filmed in Winnipeg, Manitoba, Canada. The film uses no CGI special effects at all, with the "killer tiger" portrayed by actual trained tigers. In scenes where the tiger is chasing various characters, the tiger is actually on a leash with his trainer behind him. The leash and trainer were edited out of the scenes during post-production. While Gary Busey said the tigers were a "joy" to work with, Clark joked that he was hoping they would not think he was lunch, noting that it was his first time working with tigers.

== Distribution ==
Maneater premiered in Canada on the subscription-based video on demand channel Movie Central on Demand earlier in 2007 before it aired in the United States on the Sci Fi Channel on September 8, 2007 as its Saturday night "Movie of the Week" premiere. On January 8, 2008, Genius Entertainment released the film on DVD. It included no extras, an anamorphic widescreen transfer, and a Dolby Digital 5.1 audio track. The film was re-released on July 22, 2008 as part of the first volume of the "Maneater Series Collection" sets. The volume also included Blood Monkey and In the Spider's Web, the first and second films in the series, respectively.

== Reception ==
As with many other films in the series, Maneater was panned by critics. Felix Gonzalez Jr. of DVDReview.com referred to the film as "another Z-grade extravaganza of gore and mayhem" and felt that it was typical of most Sci Fi original movies in that it contained "horrendous writing and nonsensical characters." He considered Busey's being the headliner was the first sign of trouble, stating that "with his ill-fitting suit and incomprehensible facial expressions, (Busey) is actually more frightening than the tiger." Matt Paprocki from Blogcritics felt the original novel was superior to its film adaptation, and felt the movie was "an appallingly bad creature feature that barely qualifies as such" with multiple plot holes, unexplored subplots, and stereotypical characters plagued by bad acting.

Staci Layne Wilson of Horror.com also felt the film was full of stereotypes, including a "stupid circus trainer; bible-thumping naysayer; the great white hunter; small-minded mayor; pinheaded press; wise Indian sage; [and] military sorts" but felt they were depicted in such an extreme manner that they were simply boring. She found the films conclusion to be predictable and "corny". She did praise the film's cinematography and visual appeal despite the limited number of filming locations actually used. In reviewing the film for DVD Talk, film instructor and critic Justin Felix found the use of a real tiger one of the only original elements of the film, while feeling the plot, setting, and characters followed the set Sci Fi Channel movie of the week formula. At the same time, he notes that the use of a live tiger results in most attacks occurring off screen and the tiger being rarely seen at all, taking away the "usual" fun of laughing at badly done "CG terrors." Monsters and Critics.com's Jeff Swindoll felt the film was a poor attempt at replicating Jaws with the tiger taking on the role of a "land shark." While he felt the character of Colonel Graham was contrived and seemed to come from another era, Swindoll did think Ian D. Clark did portray the character decently. Like other critics, Swindoll praised the use of a live tiger, but also notes that it was obvious the tiger was playing with the actors like a "sweet pussycat" and that the post-production editing did a bad job of trying to make it look like the tiger was a vicious killer.

Several reviewers praised the film for being more subdued than most of Sci-Fi's gore-filled creature films and for its use of a live tiger rather than poor CGI effects. However, David Johnson of DVD Verdict, heavily criticized the film for "its significant dearth of righteous tiger-attack action". He found the implied violence resulted in a boring film that will not satisfy more horror film buff: "the gore-hounds that might be attracted to the promise of a big-ass tiger sinking his teeth into some hapless rednecks will be almost certainly disappointed. The big bummer is that we don't even get any tiger on human direct action until the very end, and that's boilerplate Lassie stuff with a stuntman fending off a laid-back stunt tiger". Conversely, unlike other reviewers, he praised the characters, feeling they were interesting and ended up being ones he "somewhat cared about."
