= No Arms Can Ever Hold You =

Single by Chris Norman

from the album Some Hearts Are Diamonds
- B-side: "Hunters of the Night"
- Released: 1986
- Recorded: 1986
- Genre: Soft rock
- Length: 3:46
- Label: Hansa
- Songwriter(s): Dieter Bohlen
- Producer(s): Dieter Bohlen; Luis Rodríguez

"No Arms Can Ever Hold You" is a song by English soft rock musician Chris Norman, released as a single from his 1986 album, Some Hearts Are Diamonds. The song, produced and written by Dieter Bohlen, one half of Modern Talking, peaked at No. 52 in Germany. The song also became very popular in the Philippines.

Norman is highly popular in Germany where he scored his most hit records during the 1980s; among them "Some Hearts Are Diamonds", "Sarah", "Broken Heroes" and the number one, "Midnight Lady".

== Track listing ==
German 12" single

A. "No Arms Can Ever Hold You" (Long Version) – 5:27
B1. "Hunters of the Night" (music by Bohlen, lyrics by Chris Norman) – 4:05
B2. "No Arms Can Ever Hold You" (Instrumental) – 3:44

== Charts ==
Chart performance for "No Arms Can Ever Hold You"
Chart (1987)	Peak position
West Germany (GfK)	52
