= Grizzly Rage =

2007 television film by David DeCoteau

- DVD cover
- Written by: Arne Olsen
- Directed by: David DeCoteau
- Starring: Tyler Hoechlin; Graham Kosakoski; Brody Harms; Kate Todd
- Theme music composer: Joe Silva
- Country of origin: Canada
- Original language: English

Production
- Executive producers: Robert Halmi, Sr.
- Producer: Phyllis Laing
- Editor: Bruce Little
- Running time: 86 minutes
- Production company: Peace Arch Entertainment Group
- Budget: $2,000,000 (estimated)

Original release
- Network: Sci Fi Channel
- Release: June 7, 2007

Grizzly Rage is a 2007 Canadian television horror film produced by RHI Entertainment that premiered in Canada on the video-on-demand channel Movie Central On Demand on June 7, 2007. It aired in the United States on the Sci Fi Channel on September 16, 2007. Filmed in Winnipeg, Manitoba, Grizzly Rage is the second film in the Maneater film series produced under an agreement with Syfy. Featuring a cast of four, the film focuses on a group of teenagers who struggle to survive in a restricted forest while an enraged grizzly bear hunts them relentlessly seeking retribution for killing its cub.

Grizzly Rage breaks the standard mold for many Syfy natural horror films in that the bear featured is a normal grizzly bear rather than a mutant or genetically altered animal. However, the bear and actors never appear together in the same frame, rather a man in a bear suit takes over the role when the actors must interact with the bear. Critics panned the film, feeling its plot, script, characters, and special effects were substandard.

== Plot ==
Sean Stover, Ritch Petroski, Wes Harding and Lauren Findley celebrate their high school graduation by breaking into Saranac Grotto, a forest heavily marked with "No Trespassing" signs and surrounded by a tall fence. While speeding down a dirt road, they hit and kill a grizzly bear cub, sending their Jeep Cherokee into a tree and cracking the radiator. As they argue over whether they should bury the dead cub, they hear its mother coming and run. The vehicle overheats down the road, so Wes and Ritch go into the forest to find water. The grizzly bear finds and attacks Ritch. Having heard Ritch's screams to run, Wes inadvertently runs into the bear, and it attacks him. The other two arrive and rescue Wes but are unable to help Ritch. The bear kills him while the others flee to the Jeep.

The vehicle starts again and they leave, but Wes panics and tries to force Sean to turn around and head back for Ritch, causing the car to go over a cliff. Calmer, he wants to wait for help, but no one knows where they are because they had told their families they were going somewhere else. They winch the vehicle back up to the road, but they cannot get it to start.

Sean goes alone and jogs 15 kilometers (9.3 mi) out of the forest to find help while Wes and Lauren wait at the Jeep. He comes across a deserted shack where he finds hunting paraphernalia, a bear trap and dead animals. As Sean leaves, the bear appears. He tries to sneak past the bear, but instead, he runs into the bear. It throws him on the shack's roof and then he falls into a chicken coop. Hours later, he makes it back to the Jeep, but his leg is injured. Wes decides to climb a tall hill on the other side of the clearing to see if he can get a signal on his cell phone, but to no avail and the bear nearly catches him. He quickly climbs back down and gets back to the Jeep though it will still not start. He and Lauren hide in the Jeep with the wounded Sean in the back.

The bear follows and climbs on top of the Jeep, smashing up the car and eventually overturning it before leaving as the sun sets. Sean wakes up and tells them about the deserted shack, crying about wanting to go home before he dies. Wes and Lauren turn the Jeep right side up, load him back in the car, then push the Jeep down the hilly road as a thunderstorm hits. Using the downward momentum, they arrive near the shack. While Lauren explores the shed with the trap, the bear swings at her through a window, sending her back against the trap, impaling her back. She returns to the vehicle, where the bear rips off the tailgate and drags away Sean's body.

Wes grabs a gasoline can and pours a trail from the Jeep to the woods. They lure the grizzly bear to it and then set the gas on fire. The Jeep explodes, but the bear is unharmed. They decide to try another plan and split up. Wes climbs a tree, leaving his blood-covered clothes on the ground to trick the bear. While the bear is sniffing at the clothes, Wes accidentally drops the tire iron, alerting the bear to his presence. The bear shakes him out of the tree, but he escapes and goes to the shack where Lauren has built a trap. They lure the bear into the shed and use a trigger to close the front door behind it, locking it in. They celebrate and start to leave, but the bear breaks out of the shack, and they both try to escape. Unfortunately, Wes stumbles and Lauren tries to get him back up, refusing to leave him behind despite his desperate insistence that she should run. The bear catches up to them and kills them both.

== Cast ==
- Tyler Hoechlin as Wes Harding
- Kate Todd as Lauren Findley
- Graham Kosakoski as Sean Stover
- Brody Harms as Ritch Petroski

== Production ==
In October 2006, RHI Entertainment made a deal with the Sci Fi Channel to produce a series of ten made-for-television natural horror films to air on the network the following year. Dubbed the "Maneater" series by RHI Entertainment, Grizzly Rage was the sixth film released. Although the agreement called for the films to premiere on SciFi, the first six films in the series actually premiered in Canada on the video on demand (VOD) channel Movie Central on Demand first due to a pre-licensing agreement. It also aired on other VOD channels before its Sci Fi airing.

Grizzly Rage was filmed in Winnipeg, Manitoba, Canada. It breaks from the standard mold many natural horror films follow in that the bear attacking the main characters is not a mutant or genetically altered, rather it is a normal, but furious mother bear. The mother bear is played by Koda, a 1,600-pound (730 kg) male grizzly bear, working at the direction of a trainer. To induce the bear to appear to be roaring, the trainer gave it marshmallows to make it smile. The roaring sounds were dubbed in later. Both Tyler Hoechlin and Graham Kosakoski noted that they were a little afraid of the bear and director David DeCoteau felt that working with such a powerful live animal added an element of danger for the cast and crew during filming. As such, the bear is never actually filmed together with any of the actors. For scenes where the bear is supposed to interact with the characters, a man in a bear suit takes over the role.

== Distribution ==
Grizzly Rage premiered in Canada on the subscription-based video-on-demand channel Movie Central on Demand on June 7, 2007. It aired in the United States on the Sci Fi channel on September 16, 2007 for the channel's Saturday Night "Movie of the Week" premiere. Genius Products released the film to Region 1 DVD on May 6, 2008. The DVD release features a good video transfer, but an incorrectly mixed audio track. It has no extras, subtitles, or closed captions. The film was re-released on August 19, 2008 as part of the second volume of the "Maneater Series Collection" sets. The volume also included Croc and Eye of the Beast, the fourth and fifth films in the series, respectively.

== Reception ==
Critics panned Grizzly Rage. Film historian Paul Mavis called the film "a pathetically undernourished effort", feeling the film was plagued with a bad plot, bad acting, bad direction, and bad special effects. In comparing Grizzly, a 1976 natural horror film, and Grizzly Man, a 2005 documentary showing the life and death of amateur bear enthusiast Timothy Treadwell, he found it sorely lacking. Mavis states that it was a horror film that did not show anyone getting "sliced, diced, munched on and stomped" by the bear. He also heavily criticizes the film for not having any scenes where the bear is actually in the same frame as any of the actors, wondering if the actors and/or trainers were afraid something tragic would happen. As a whole, he recommended skipping the film. Film critic David Walker agreed. Like Mavis, Walker compared the film to the 1976 Grizzly and found it severely lacking. He also felt the plot was poorly conceived and was combined with a badly written script and uninteresting characters:

At the very least you would hope that Grizzly Rage is laughably bad, but it doesn't even inspire a chuckle or half a grin. It is as bad as bad can get, and without some of the more common exploitation elements we should expect from a journeyman hack like director David DeCoteau—the man responsible for classics like Sorority Babes in the Slimeball Bowl-O-Rama and Test Tube Teens from the Year 2000—there is no reason to watch this movie.

— David Walker, DVD Talk

Jeff Swindoll of Monsters and Critics repeated many of the same sentiments in his review of the film. He hated the characters within the first five minutes of the film and found himself wishing that the film had shown more of the bear just walking in the woods rather than the characters talking with one another between the attacks. Matt Gamble of UGO Entertainment was excited by the film's cover, but was also quickly disappointed by "insipid dialog" amongst the characters and their continuously calling each other "dude." The characters actually asking what a bear was doing in the Canadian wilderness, where bears are plentiful, amused him, though he notes that it was probably not the intended reaction for the scene. His final rating of the film was an "F." DVD Verdict's David Johnson also questioned why the bear and actors are never seen on screen together. He derided the scenes in which the bear would make a swiping motion, and the scene would cut to show a character flying through the air: "I don't know how the bear mastered the art of jujitsu in the wild, but it comes in handy when four teenagers snuff your cub and they need a healthy dose of comeuppance." He also wondered at the lack of fake blood or props being used during attacks rather than "ridiculous blood splatter computer graphics tossed on the screen." Multiple critics noted that the film introduced two potentially interesting subplots that ended up being pointless as the film never explored either, and they all agreed that the film had excellent picture quality.

Tim Anderson, reviewer for Bloody Disgusting, disagreed on some points. He found the film to be cheesy, but very watchable. He praised DeCocteau's pacing of the film and felt the cast of four was "serviceable." He also praised the use of a real bear. Like other reviewers, was disappointed by the bear not being in the same scenes with the actors though he notes that at least the bear suit used in such scenes was well made. As a whole, he notes that "ridiculous is the very nature of the Maneater Series. So, I don't fault them for following suit on this production..." and concludes with the remark that Grizzly Rage is "a pretty silly but satisfying little fright flick" and rated it a seven out of ten.

== Soundtrack ==
Sci Fi licensed the song "Bright Light Rockin'City" by rock band Floor Thirteen for use in the film. Though the film's soundtrack has not been released to CD in North America, it was released on soundtrack in Australia on June 19, 2008 by Horizon.
