= The Christmas Heart =

- Written by: Michael Heaton
- Directed by: Gary Yates
- Starring: Teri Polo; Paul Essiembre; Ty Wood
- Theme music composer: Shawn Pierce
- Country of origin: United States
- Original language: English

Production
- Producer: Patricia Heaton
- Cinematography: Michael Marshal
- Editor: Brad Caslor
- Running time: 90 minutes
- Production companies: Julijette; Xmas Heart Films

Original release
- Network: Hallmark Channel
- Release: December 2, 2012

The Christmas Heart is a 2012 Hallmark Channel Christmas film directed by Gary Yates. The film was first released on the Hallmark Channel on December 2, 2012 and stars Teri Polo, Paul Essiembre, and Ty Wood. The film's premise follows a group of neighbors that come together to help provide emotional support for a teenage boy that needs a heart transplant.

== Plot ==
The neighbors along Arthur Avenue in Cleveland have a forty-year tradition of lining their quaint street with Christmas luminaria, but one year the tradition is placed on hold out of respect for the Normans (Ann and Mike), whose son Matt is seriously ill and in need of a heart transplant. The situation causes their younger son, Tommy, to emotionally withdraw.

In Detroit, a man expecting his first child suddenly dies. His heart is found to be a match for Matt, but a lack of transportation threatens to keep it from getting to Cleveland. Finally, a small plane is found (a two-seater which must now carry three people: the pilot, a nurse carrying the heart, and a surgeon dressed as Santa), but is unable to land due to a blizzard arriving in Cleveland. Meanwhile, the donor's girlfriend goes into labor back in Detroit.

Tommy refuses to believe that Matt is going to die, and decides he's going to light the luminaria (with the help of Bob, a neighbor known along the street as somewhat pessimistic). Between them all the luminaria are lit, which provides a surprise – the small plane sees the lit street and manages to land the plane on it (at that same time the donor's girlfriend gives birth), eventually getting the heart to the Cleveland Clinic and transplanted into Matt.

== Cast ==
- Teri Polo as Ann Norman
- Paul Essiembre as Mike Norman
- Ty Wood as Matt Norman
- Cruise Brown as Tommy Norman
- Tess Harper as Elizabeth
- John B. Lowe as Don Foy
- Susan Kelso as Yvonne
- Samantha Kendrick as Karen
- Blake Taylor as Bob
- Cherissa Richards as Dr. Shirazi
- Adam Hurtig as Jimmy Mars
- Arden Alfonso as Nicky
- Stephen Eric McIntyre as John
- Mike Bell as Ray
- Jess Mal Gibbons as Miller (as Jess Gibbons)
- Paul Magel as Dr. Brady
- Aisha Alfa as Nurse Detroit
- Adriana O'Neil as Nurse Cleveland

== Production ==
Heaton first began working on a treatment for The Christmas Heart around 2000 and pitched it to a Hollywood executive, but a film deal was never confirmed. His sister Patricia Heaton remembered the script Heaton had written and sent a copy of his treatment to Hallmark, who purchased the treatment and the script. Filming for The Christmas Heart took place in Winnipeg, Manitoba during March 2012. Due to the unseasonably warm weather in Winnipeg, the film crew had to make snow to make it look "like winter", but was also able to find "a snow bank in the parking lot of a church".

== Reception ==
Critical reception was mixed to positive, and the Christian Film Database stated that they found the film "very touching". A reviewer for The Philadelphia Inquirer remarked that the film "[followed the] made-for-TV Christmas formula" and that it "would work better if we were a little more invested in young Matt and his survival", but that the ending was satisfying. The Akron Beacon Journal also commented that the film held "no surprises" but that "if you are willing to surrender to its unabashed sentimentality, you may find reason for a sniffle or two, and maybe a reason to smile at the end".

== See also ==
- List of Christmas films
