= Croc (film) =

2007 film by Stewart Raffill

- DVD cover
- Genre: Horror
- Written by: Ken Solarz
- Directed by: Stewart Raffill
- Starring: Michael Madsen; Peter Tuinstra; Sherry Phungprasert; Elizabeth Healy; Scott Hazell
- Theme music composer: Charles Olins; Mark Ryder
- Country of origin: United States
- Original language: English

Production
- Producer: Charles Salmon
- Cinematography: Choochart Nantitanyatada
- Editors: Laurie McDowell; Kant Pan
- Running time: 100 minutes
- Production company: Thai Occidental Productions
- Budget: $750,000 (estimated)

Original release
- Network: Sci Fi Channel
- Release: November 4, 2007

Croc is a 2007 American made-for-television natural horror film produced by RHI Entertainment that premiered in Canada on the video-on-demand channel Movie Central On Demand in July 2007. It aired in the United States on the Sci Fi Channel on November 4, 2007. Croc is the sixth film in the Maneater film series produced under an agreement with Sci Fi. Filmed in Thailand, the film revolves around the efforts of Jack McQuade, the owner of a crocodile-farm, Evelyn Namwong, an animal welfare agent Croc Hawkins, and a hunter trying to kill a large saltwater crocodile that has begun killing people in the area.

== Plot ==
The film begins with two dynamite fishermen working. They disturb an enormous saltwater crocodile and the beast attacks, mutilates, and kills both of them.

Jack McQuade runs a crocodile farm in Thailand with the help of his sister, Allison, and her son, Theo. A new neighboring resort owned by Andy and Cao Konsong constantly harasses Jack. They want to get Jack shut down because they have buildings on the land and want to steal the rest. The Konsong brothers set animal welfare, bill collectors and tax collectors on the farm. As animal welfare investigator, Evelyn Namwong, refuses to shut down the farm, having found only minor violations, she is fired. After the beast eats Som and Anoon, two teenagers, the Konsongs send goons to break in and release three of the farm's crocodiles. Jack's crocodiles are blamed, and he gets orders to shut down until further notice.

The beast that killed Som and Anoon reappears and eats Raymond, a young boy near the docks. It is filmed by a tourist nearby and identified as a 20 ft (6.1 m) saltwater crocodile, much larger and of a different species than Jack's crocodiles. Jack's farm is cleared, and he is able to reopen. With the beast continuing to snack on the local population, Jack and Evelyn run into Croc Hawkins, a man who has been hunting the beast for months. Hawkins, Evelyn, and Jack join forces to find and kill the beast. While they are talking, they hear gunfire. Two hunters claim to have killed the beast, but it is actually one of Jack's escaped crocs. They quickly rush over, only to see the beast kill Chet, one of the hunters.

While they hunt the beast, the Konsongs send someone to kill Allison because she paid Jack's taxes and other bills to help him out. The goon tries to run her down but misses. He leaves behind his cell phone, which links him back to Andy Konsong. Andy heads home to warn Cao that their plot has been uncovered. He finds Cao in pieces, floating in a bloodied pool. It is clearly another attack of the beast. Panicked, Andy calls 911 and then gets sick to his stomach. While Andy is throwing up in the pool, the beast emerges and kills him.

Evelyn, Jack, Hawkins, and the crocodile farm manager Peter go looking for the beast's pit. Allison and Theo follow in a small boat. The beast appears and snatches Allison. Jack and the rest of the team continue searching for the pit underwater, while Hawkins and Theo go to search on land. They find the pit and Allison. She is unconscious, but still alive. She wakes up to see the beast with its jaws right in front of her head, but it leaves when it hears Jack calling for her. It comes up behind Jack, gets a hold of his foot, and drags him underwater. As it goes down, Hawkins and Theo shoot at it. Hawkins manages to kill it. Jack is trapped underwater, with his leg in the beast's mouth. Hawkins is too high up to help Jack, and Allison can't get the beast's mouth open. Hawkins advises Allison to cut off Jack's leg to free him. Instead, the park manager uses a bang stick to blast open its mouth, and Jack gets to keep his leg.

== Cast ==
- Michael Madsen as "Croc" Hawkins
- Peter Tuinstra as Jack McQuade
- Sherry Prungpasert as Evelyn Namawong
- Elizabeth Healey as Allison McQuade
- Scott Hazell as Theo
- Jibby Saetang as Andy Konsong
- Wason Junsook as Cao Konsong Sr.
- Jack Prinya as Detective Sergeant Dang
- Deedee Kumphasee as Chompoo
- David Asavanond as Som
- Amy Lackgren as Sunee
- Nophand Boonyai as Corporal Leu
- Pim Yensuk as Kanya
- Elizabeth Lackgren as Anoon
- Wattana Kanchanasatit as Klip
- Clyde St. George as Peter
- Suunthara Phumijan as The Mayor
- Surat Pramtong as Admiral
- Maria Lackgren as Mrs. Konsong
- Kant Pan as Mr. Phan
- Lalita Chant as Chet
- Sawit Prasertphan as Kama
- Patrice Veasey as Raymond
- Tracey Tongkeow as Liz
- Rungsak Saenmuangchin as Buddy
- Selina Lo as Chompoo (voice) (uncredited)

== Production ==
In October 2006, RHI Entertainment made a deal with the Sci Fi Channel to produce a series of ten made-for-television natural horror films to air on the network the following year. Dubbed the Maneater series by RHI Entertainment, Croc was the fourth film released. Although the agreement called for the films to premiere on Sci Fi, the first six films in the series actually premiered in Canada on the video on demand channel Movie Central on Demand in July 2007 due to a pre-licensing agreement.

== Distribution ==
Croc premiered in the United States on the Sci Fi channel on November 4, 2007 for the channel's Saturday night "Movie of the Week" premiere. Genius Products released the film to Region 1 DVD on February 5, 2008. The film was re-released on August 19, 2008 as part of the second volume of the "Maneater Series Collection" sets. The volume also included Eye of the Beast and Grizzly Rage, the fifth and sixth films in the series, respectively. In 2008, RHI Entertainment released the film to the iTunes Store for downloading.

== See also ==
- List of killer crocodile films
