= Head over Heels in Love =

Head over Heels in Love may refer to:

- Head over Heels in Love (film) or Head over Heels, a 1937 British musical film
- "Head over Heels in Love" (song), by Kevin Keegan, 1979
- "Head over Heels in Love", a song by Don Wayne, 1958
- "Head over Heels in Love", a song by Glenda Collins, 1961

== See also ==
- Head over Heels (disambiguation)
