= Maneater (film series) =

Series of American made-for-television horror films

Maneater Series is the name, logo and line look given to a series of made-for-television natural horror films on DVD produced by RHI Entertainment for the Syfy Channel, and distributed by Vivendi Entertainment. The Maneater Series logo and line look were created under the direction of Danny Tubbs, the executive director of creative services of Vivendi Entertainment. The deal, made in October 2006, stipulated that the first ten films would premiere on the US-based channel in 2007, but due to a pre-licensing agreement, the first six actually premiered in Canada on the video on demand channel Movie Central on Demand. Most of the early films in the series were filmed in Winnipeg, Manitoba, Canada.

RHI has continued adding new films to the series, most of which are shown first on Syfy before being released to DVD. In 2013, the website was shut down due to technical difficulties. The series was put on hold after 2011 because of RHI's financial problems but was then revived in 2013 with Scarecrow. Two more films were released in 2015.

== Films ==
#	Title	Subject matter	Television Premiere	DVD release	Writer	Director	Producer
1	Blood Monkey	Gorilla-like ape	January 27, 2008	November 6, 2007	George LaVoo; Gary Dauberman	Robert Young	Charles Salmon
2	Grizzly Rage	Grizzly bear	June 7, 2007	May 6, 2008	Arne Olsen	David DeCoteau	Robert Halmi, Sr. Phyllis Laing
3	In the Spider's Web	Venomous spiders	August 26, 2007	November 6, 2007	Gary Dauberman	Terry Windsor	Charles Salmon
4	Maneater	Bengal tiger	September 8, 2007	January 8, 2008	Philip Morton	Gary Yates	Phyllis Laing
5	Something Beneath	Slime beast	October 21, 2007	September 9, 2008	Mark Mullin; Ethlie Ann Vare	David Winning	Phyllis Laing
6	Croc	Saltwater crocodile	November 4, 2007	February 5, 2008	Ken Solarz	Stewart Raffill	Charles Salmon
7	Eye of the Beast	Giant squid	December 8, 2007	April 1, 2008	Mark Mullin	Gary Yates	Phyllis Laing
8	The Hive	Army ants	February 17, 2008	August 5, 2008	T.S. Cook	Peter Manus	Charles Salmon
9	Black Swarm	Wasps	March 13, 2008	February 3, 2009	Ethlie Ann Vare; Todd Samovitz	David Winning	Irene Litinsky; Ric Nish
10	Hybrid	Werewolves; Wolves	March 16, 2008	July 8, 2008	Arne Olsen	Yelena Lanksaya	Phyllis Laing
11	Shark Swarm	Great white sharks	May 25, 2008	June 3, 2008	David Rosiak; Matthew Chernov	James A. Contner	Kyle Clark; Patsy Fitzgerald; Stephen Niver
12	Vipers	Horned vipers	September 21, 2008	September 23, 2008	Brian Katkin	Bill Corcoran	Mary Anne Waterhouse
13	Swamp Devil	Swamp monster	October 12, 2008	April 9, 2009	Gary Dauberman	David Winning	Irene Litinsky; Ric Nish
14	Yeti: Curse of the Snow Demon	Yeti	November 8, 2008	January 13, 2009	Rafael Jordan	Paul Ziller	Daniel Grodnik
15	Wyvern	Wyvern	January 31, 2009	August 18, 2009	Jason Bourque	Steven R. Monroe	Kirk Shaw
16	Sea Beast	Sea monster	March 14, 2009	June 30, 2009	Paul Ziller; Neil Elman	Paul Ziller	Breanne Hartley
17	Carny	Jersey Devil	April 25, 2009	March 23, 2010	Douglas G. Davis	Sheldon Wilson	Irene Litinsky; Sandrine Gros d'Aillon; Nancy Boucher
18	Rise of the Gargoyles	Gargoyle	June 21, 2009	September 8, 2009	Andy Briggs	Bill Corcoran	François Sylvestre; Andreea Stanculeanu
19	Malibu Shark Attack	Goblin Sharks	July 25, 2009	August 16, 2011	Keith Shaw	David Lister	Dale G. Bradley; Grant Bradley; Richard Stewart; Brian Trenchard-Smith
20	Sand Serpents	Prehistoric worms	July 11, 2009	November 3, 2009	Raul Inglis	Jeff Renfroe	Ric Nish
21	Hellhounds	Hellhounds	July 19, 2009	February 16, 2010	Paul A. Birkett; Jason Bourque	Ricky Schroder	Ric Nish
22	High Plains Invaders	Aliens	August 30, 2009	April 6, 2010	Richard Beattie	Kristoffer Tabori	Ric Nish
23	Behemoth	Kaiju	January 15, 2011	April 5, 2011	Rachelle S. Howie	W.D. Hogan	John Prince
24	Ferocious Planet	Beasts from a parallel dimension	April 9, 2011	July 5, 2011	Douglas G. Davis	Billy O'Brien	Mary Callery
25	Roadkill	Roc	April 23, 2011	August 30, 2011	Rick Suvalle	Johannes Roberts	Adrian Sturges
26	Scarecrow	Scarecrow	October 19, 2013	February 25, 2014	Rick Suvalle	Sheldon Wilson	Lacey Chabert
27	Shark Killer	Blacktip shark	June 16, 2015	September, 2015	Richard Beattie; Sheldon Wilson	Sheldon Wilson	Lance Samuels; Mary Anne Waterhouse
28	The Hollow	Curse	October 24, 2015	2016	Rick Suvalle; Sheldon Wilson	Sheldon Wilson	Jamie Goehring
