= Blood Monkey =

2007 American horror film

- DVD cover
- Directed by: Robert Young
- Written by: George LaVoo; Gary Dauberman
- Produced by: Charles Salmon
- Starring: F. Murray Abraham; Prapimporn Kanjunda; Matt Ryan; Amy Manson; Freishia Bomanbehram; Matt Reeves; Sebastian Armesto; Laura Aikman
- Cinematography: Choochart Nantitanyatada
- Edited by: Anuradha Singh
- Music by: Charles Olins; Mark Ryder
- Production companies: Thai Occidental Production; RHI Entertainment
- Distributed by: Genius Entertainment
- Release dates: September 24, 2007 (Greece); January 27, 2008 (United States)
- Running time: 90 minutes
- Country: United States
- Language: English

Blood Monkey is a 2007 American direct-to-video natural horror film produced by RHI Entertainment and directed by Robert Young. It aired on various video on demand channels, before officially premiering in the United States on the Syfy Channel (called Sci-Fi channel at the time it premiered) on January 27, 2008. Filmed in Thailand, it is the first film in the Maneater film series produced under an agreement with Syfy.

The film followed a group of six students studying primates in Asia under the demented Professor Hamilton who find themselves under attack from bloodthirsty primates in the jungle.

Reviewers panned the film, criticizing the acting, dialogue, plot, low-quality special effects, and the lack of appearances by the titular monster, the monkeys. They also questioned the appearance of F. Murray Abraham in the film, though note that his performance was its only positive aspect.

== Plot ==
Anthropological professor Conrad Hamilton attempts to study a new species of primate in Thailand; looking for the missing link between humanity and the great ape. His team dies trying to catch one for study. Hamilton and his assistant Chenne are the only survivors.

Meanwhile, college anthropology students are flown into a remote region of the Asian jungle and picked up by a guide. He drops them off at the edge of a road, but refuses to go further, as "bad things" are in there. After reaching the trail's end, the students set up camp. At night, the creature attacks, but Chenne appears and scares it off with a flare.

Chenne escorts the students to Hamilton's camp. The following day, Hamilton mentions an uncharted valley within the jungle and its potential for career-launching documentation. He has Chenne confiscate the students' mobile phones and hand out information bracelets for each member containing their emergency contact info. Then, he leads the team to the valley entrance. The group rappels down the cliffside and into the valley, injuring Josh in the process.

On the first night in the valley, Hamilton passes around a skull which belongs to the primate. The students cannot identify the skull, which is nearly twice the size of any known human or primate cranium. They are interrupted by a bloody survivor from the original research team. Hamilton and Chenne care for the man, who eventually dies. Hamilton thinks that the creatures let him go as a warning.

During the night, Sydney visits the outhouse, only to be dragged away into the jungle. The next morning, Hamilton announces that Sydney came to him scared and wanting to go home, so Hamilton had Chenne take her out of the jungle. Meanwhile, Chenne drags Sydney through the jungle and leaves her battered and beaten. Sydney eventually stumbles into a creature that kills her.

The team continues to follow Hamilton and Chenne. Hamilton is secretly tracking each student by a hidden chipset in their bracelets. The students resolve to steal Hamilton's AK-47 and gain control of the situation. Seth begins leaving a trail through the jungle by tying off pieces of cloth to trees.

At night, while the students begin to fashion their plan for the following day, a foul-smelling rain begins pouring down on their tents. Just as they recognize the smell as urine, Josh is yanked out of his tent and dragged up into the trees. The team scatters and begins following Josh's screams through the jungle. As Greg attempts to save Josh, Chenne accidentally shoots him, but then proceeds to tie him to a tree as bait. She camps out nearby with her gun. One of the monsters eventually sneaks up on Chenne and kills her before mauling Greg.

Hamilton runs across Seth during the chaos and knocks him unconscious. Hamilton locates the two remaining students, Dani and Amy, and orders the former to document everything with her video camera. Believing themselves to be the only survivors, both girls are forced to obey Hamilton. He tracks Sydney's bracelet and finds it still attached to her severed arm, dangling from a tree. Hamilton examines an apparent rigging done to the tree, only to spring a trap that results in bamboo shoots impaling him through the back.

After he dies, the girls return to their campsite, only to find it cleared of their tents and equipment. They keep running while the monster seems to be following them. Dani is eventually killed, leaving only Seth and Amy standing. They reach a cave and see Seth's entire cloth trail assembled and attached to the opening. Inside the cave, Seth is killed.

Amy sheds light on one of the monsters for the first time, revealing it to be a large ape with a bloody set of fangs. More apes appear, and Amy screams in terror before one of them kills her.

== Cast ==
- F. Murray Abraham as Professor Conrad Hamilton
- Matt Ryan as Seth Roland
- Amy Manson as Amy Armstrong
- Matt Reeves as Greg Satch
- Laura Aikman as Sydney Maas
- Sebastian Armesto as Josh Dawson
- Freishia Bomanbehram as Dani Sudeva
- Prapimporn Karnchanda as Chenne

== Production ==
In October 2006, RHI Entertainment made a deal with the Sci Fi Channel to produce a series of ten made-for-television natural horror films to air on the network the following year. Dubbed the "Maneater" series by RHI Entertainment, Blood Monkey was the first film of the series to be released. Although the agreement called for the films to premiere on SciFi, the first six films in the series actually premiered in Canada on video on demand due to an existing pre-licensing agreement.

F. Murray Abraham felt his character was "so interesting because he is so monomaniacal". For one scene, in which the characters had to scale a high cliff, the actors learned abseiling—the controlled descent down a rope along an extremely steep cliff or slope—and performed the stunt themselves. Abraham said it was a "thrilling" challenge. Matt Ryan felt the most challenging part of filming the movie was all of the running through the jungle that was required for many scenes.

== Release ==
Blood Monkey premiered in Canada on the subscription-based video on demand channel Movie Central on Demand earlier in 2007 as well as other VOD channels before it aired on Syfy, then the Sci Fi Channel, on January 27, 2008. It was released on DVD on November 6, 2007 by Genius Entertainment, with no extras. The film was re-released to DVD on July 22, 2008 as one of three films included on the first volume of the "Maneater Series Collection" film sets. The other two films were In the Spider's Web and Maneater, the second and third films in the series, respectively.

== Reception ==
Blood Monkey was panned by critics. Horror.com's Staci Layne Wilson felt Blood Monkey was "abysmal" with forgettable, expendable actors following F. Murray Abraham. In reviewing the film for DVD Talk, author Nick Lyons thought the six students were "stereotypical" and expressed sorrow that "respected award winning actor F. Murray Abraham...lowered himself to star in this." Noting that other films in the genre are often "so bad it's good", he felt Blood Monkey failed to accomplish even this dubious achievement. Most of the film was deemed "unwatchable" for mostly having scenes of the characters walking about aimlessly and a seeming lack of production values. Monsters and Critics.com's Jeff Swindoll also questioned Abraham's apparently not knowing "better than to star in this dreck" as a "cheapjack version of Captain Ahab". He panned the film's laughable special effects, though he offered it minor praise for its "rather bleak ending" similar to the series' title Maneater. David Johnson of DVD Verdict criticized the film's low budget and "trite" acting, with no fright value when the actual creature does not appear until even the end of the film. Scott Weinberg, reviewing the film for FEARnet, considers the film "extra-stupid" and also notes the film's lack of appearances by the titular creature. Stating "the dialog is rotten, the actors are bad, and the FX are hilarious", he felt Abraham delivered "a patently perfect performance" and notes that he "gets progressively more outlandish as the movie goes on."
