= Ty Wood =

Canadian actor (born 1995)

- Born: Tyson Wood; September 17, 1995 (age 31); Winnipeg, Manitoba, Canada
- Occupation: Actor
- Years active: 2002–present
- Spouse: Karis Cameron (m. 2026)

Tyson Wood (born September 17, 1995) is a Canadian actor. He has had several roles including his role as Tim Cherry in the biographical television drama Keep Your Head Up Kid: The Don Cherry Story and in the role of Billy Campbell in the horror film The Haunting in Connecticut.

== Biography ==
Wood is from Winnipeg, Manitoba, and currently resides in Vancouver. Wood made his film debut in 2002, having a role in the movie Hell on Heels: The Battle of Mary Kay playing the younger version of R.H. Thomson's character, Richard Rogers.

In 2003, he had a role in the television movie On Thin Ice as Nate Kilmer. In 2005, Wood would be seen in the feature film, The Big White alongside Robin Williams, the same year he was seen in the television series, The Collector in the episode "The Mother" as well as a television movie, Vinegar Hill.

In 2007, he had a role in the television movie, Maneater as Roy Satterly. Wood can be seen in the 2008 film The Lazarus Project. He currently attends school in Canada.

In 2009, Wood had a role in the film The Haunting in Connecticut as Billy Campbell, winning Young Artist Awards for Best Performance in a Feature Film Supporting Young Actor for his performance.

In 2012, Wood was cast as Matt Norman in the Hallmark Channel movie The Christmas Heart, which was released on the Hallmark Channel on December 2, 2012 and stars Teri Polo, Paul Essiembre and Cruise Brown.

From 2014 to 2015, Wood took on a recurring role in the drama series When Calls the Heart, in which he played the supporting role as Wyatt Weaver, where he won a Joey Award for Young Ensemble Cast in a Dramatic Series. In 2015, Wood took on a supporting role in the comedy family film Liar, Liar, Vampire which was directed by Vince Marcello, starring Rahart Adams, Brec Bassinger and Tiera Skovbye.

In 2016, Wood appeared on the second and third seasons of the educational comedy series Project Mc2, in which he played the supporting role as Justin Clarke. On the same year, Wood appeared in the television film Unleashing Mr. Darcy as Joe Markham.

In 2017, Wood worked in the TV films such as: From Straight A's to XXX as Gavin and Christmas Princess as Trent. Also the same year, Wood appeared in a guest role–as Treat Tucker in the crime mystery series Garage Sale Mystery in the episode "The Beach Murder".

In 2018, Wood was cast to play the lead role in the teen drama sci-fi live-action/CGI-animated television series ReBoot: The Guardian Code alongside Sydney Scotia, Ajay Friese and Gabriel Darku, in which he played the lead role of Austin Carter, a.k.a. Vector, the leader of the team whose color is red and is the son of Adam Carter/Sourcerer. From 2018 to 2020, Wood played the recurring role of Billy Marlin in the supernatural horror streaming television series Chilling Adventures of Sabrina.

In 2019, Wood was cast in the horror thriller film Spiral starring Jeffrey Bowyer-Chapman and Ari Cohen, in which was premiered August 25, 2019 at Arrow Video Frightfest and was screened at other horror and LGBTQ film festivals through late 2019 and early 2020. It premiered on Shudder in September 2020.

Wood appeared in a guest role–as Gregory Crain in the horror drama series The Order and also appeared as a guest role of Zach in the comedy-drama series BH90210.

In 2021, Wood will play Beau Andreas in four television films adapted from V. C. Andrews' Landry novels for Lifetime. Ruby, Pearl in the Mist, All That Glitters and Hidden Jewel will be broadcast across two consecutive weekends from 20 March 2021.

In 2022, Wood played the recurring role as Teddy Harrington in the suspense thriller miniseries Devil in Ohio which was created by Daria Polatin based on Polatin's book of the same name for Netflix.

In 2023, Wood appeared in the musical romantic comedy-drama series Grease: Rise of the Pink Ladies, which was series is a prequel to the film Grease (1978), based on the stage musical of the same name by Jim Jacobs and Warren Casey.

== Personal life ==
In November 2019, Wood began a relationship with actress Karis Cameron, known for her role in the series Off Campus. Wood and Cameron announced their engagement on August 1, 2026.

== Filmography ==
=== Film ===
Year	Film	Role	Notes
2002	Hell on Heels: The Battle of Mary Kay	Young Richard Rogers	First film role
2003	On Thin Ice	Nate Kilmer	Television movie
2005	Vinegar Hill	Bert Grier	Television movie
2005	The Big White	Paperboy	
2007	Maneater	Roy Satterly	
2008	The Lazarus Project	Young Ben Garvey	
2009	New in Town	Hockey Player	Uncredited
2009	The Haunting in Connecticut	Billy Campbell	
2009	Throwing Stones	Dylan Campbell	Television movie
2012	The Christmas Heart	Matt Norman	Television movie
2015	Liar, Liar, Vampire	Bon	Original movie
2016	Unleashing Mr. Darcy	Joe Markham	Television movie
2017	From Straight A's to XXX	Gavin	Television movie
2017	Garage Sale Mystery: The Beach Murder	Treat Tucker	Television movie
2017	Christmas Princess	Trent	Television movie
2019	Spiral	Tyler	
2021	Ruby	Beau Andreas	
2021	Pearl in the Mist	Beau Andreas	
2021	All That Glitters	Beau Andreas	
2021	Hidden Jewel	Beau Andreas	

=== Television ===
Year	Television series	Role	Notes
2005	The Collector	Jared Beaumont	Episode: "The Mother"
2010	Keep Your Head Up Kid: The Don Cherry Story	Unknown	Mini Series
2014–2015	When Calls the Heart	Wyatt Weaver	Recurring role (Seasons 1-2)
2015	Cedar Cove	Teenage Boy	Episode: "A Helping Hand"
2016	Supernatural	Doug	Episode "Don't You Forget About Me"
2016	Second Chance	Liam	Episode: "Admissions"
2016	Project Mc^{2}	Justin Clarke	Recurring role (seasons 2-3)
2018	IZombie	Thor	Episode: "Are You Ready for Some Zombies?"
2018	ReBoot: The Guardian Code	Austin Carter	Main role
2018–2020	Chilling Adventures of Sabrina	Billy Marlin	Recurring role
2019	The Order	Gregory	Recurring role (season 1)
2019	BH90210	Zach	6 episodes
2020	Riverdale	Billy Marlin	Episode: "Chapter Sixty-Seven: Varsity Blues"
2021	Kung Fu	Justin Taylor	Episode: "Choice"
2022	Devil in Ohio	Teddy	5 episodes
2023	Grease: Rise of the Pink Ladies	Trip	5 episodes

== Awards and nominations ==
Year	Award	Category	Work	Result
2010	Young Artist Award	Best Performance in a Feature Film - Supporting Young Actor	The Haunting in Connecticut	Won
2011	Young Artist Award	Best Performance in a TV Movie, Miniseries or Special - Supporting Young Actor	Keep Your Head Up Kid: The Don Cherry Story	Nominated
2014	Joey Award	Young Ensemble Cast in a Dramatic Series	When Calls the Heart	Won
2021	Leo Awards	Best Supporting Performance by a Male in a Television Movie	V.C. Andrews' Landry Family	Nominated
