= In the Spider's Web =

2007 television film

- DVD Cover
- Genre: Horror
- Written by: Gary Dauberman
- Directed by: Terry Winsor
- Starring: Lance Henriksen; Cian Barry; Emma Catherwood
- Theme music composer: Mark Ryder
- Country of origin: United States
- Original language: English

Production
- Producer: Charles Salmon
- Editors: Laurie McDowell; Sawit Prasertphan
- Running time: 86 minutes
- Production company: RHI Entertainment

Original release
- Network: Sci Fi Channel
- Release: August 26, 2007

In the Spider's Web is a 2007 American made-for-television natural horror film produced by RHI Entertainment and directed by Terry Winsor. It aired on various video on demand channels, before officially premiering in the United States on Syfy on August 26, 2007. It is the third film in the Maneater film series, a set of horror films produced in partnership with Syfy.

== Plot ==
American backpacker friends Gina, John, Stacey, Geraldine, and Phil hike in the woods with their guide Brian in India. When a venomous spider bites Geraldine, the group decides to seek an American doctor, Dr. Lecorpus, who lives with a tribe in the jungle. Dr. Lecorpus treats Geraldine with the help of his brother, who wears a cloth over his disfigured face. While Gina, John, and Phil return to the village in the civilization, Brian and Stacey stay with the natives. They decide to visit a temple in the forest while waiting for Geraldine to recover. However, the two get split up, and Stacey is attacked by a mass of spiders, swarming and covering her in spider webs.

Gina, John, and Phil arrive back at the village and head to the local police station. They meet Sgt. Chadhri, who agrees to investigate the village. Chadhri enters the woods and sees Lecorpus and several of the natives standing near a helicopter. However, Lecorpus' brother catches Chadhri; they take his gun and force him to walk to the village. Chadhri decides to investigate the temple and is attacked by Lecorpus' brother, who chases him deep into the temple.

The other three become worried after Chadhri does not return, and Phil walks to a bigger village while Gina and John return to the woods. They arrive back at the village and witness a strange ceremony. They see Stacey, still wrapped in spider webs, injected with venom and carried off into the temple by Lecorpus' brother. Natives rush and attack Gina and John to save Stacey. Gina finds Stacey, and Lecorpus then appears and tells Gina that Stacey is just paralyzed and not dead. John and Gina run into the temple and get split up.

Meanwhile, Phil discovers a newspaper suggesting Lecorpus illegally harvested organs. Gina and John find Stacey's camcorder and an alive Brian, but he dies shortly after. Gina and John meet up with Chadhri and try to find their way out of the caves. They come across an operation room and discover that Lecorpus, his brother, and the natives are all in on a scheme to harvest travelers' organs. They inject their victim with the venom to prevent the organs from spoiling while being transported. Gina, John, and Chadhri manage to free Stacey and escape the operating room.

Gina, John, Stacey, and Chadhri run through the various tunnels while Lecorpus' brother and the natives pursue them. They start a fire in a tunnel, and Lecorpus' brother gets caught in the fire. Gina, John, Stacey, and Chadhri use spider webs to climb across a massive chasm in order to escape. Chadhri goes first, followed by Stacey, and then Gina. However, Chadhri tells John to wait before climbing on the web because it cannot sustain all their weight. After Chadhri and Stacey make it to the other side, John attempts to get on, but the web snaps, leaving Gina hanging above the chasm and stranding John on the opposite side.

Gina swings to the side of the chasm and throws Lecorpus in when he tries to kill her; spiders swarm and kill him. Gina and Stacey leave with Chadhri, who promises John that he will come back for him. The three escape the temple, but Lecorpus' brother attacks them. Before he can kill Chadhri, a group of police officers led by Phil appears and shoots him dead. Phil reunites with Gina and Stacey, who tell him that Brian and Geraldine are dead. They also inform the police officers that John is still trapped inside, and spiders then attack him.

Sometime later, Gina is seen back in the village. She is visited by Chadhri, whom she tells that Stacey is getting better. He tells her that while John has not been found, he and the other officers are working around the clock to find him. However, John is shown completely encased in spider webs before the film ends.

== Cast ==
- Lance Henriksen as Dr. Lecorpus
- Emma Catherwood as Gina
- Lisa Livingstone as Stacey
- Cian Barry as John
- Sohrab Ardeshir as Sergeant Chadhri
- Mike Rogers as Brian
- Michael Smiley as Phil
- Jane Perry as Geraldine
- Rajesh Latkar as Indian Police Officer

== Production ==
In October 2006, RHI Entertainment made a deal with the Sci Fi Channel to produce a series of ten made-for-television natural horror films to air on the network the following year. Dubbed the "Maneater" series by RHI Entertainment, In the Spider's Web was the second film of the series to be released. Although the agreement called for the films to premiere on SciFi, the first six films in the series actually premiered in Canada on video on demand due to an existing pre-licensing agreement.

== Distribution ==
In the Spider's Web premiered in Canada on the subscription-based video on demand channel Movie Central on Demand earlier in 2007 as well as other VOD channels before it aired on Syfy, then the Sci Fi Channel, on August 26, 2007. It was released on DVD on November 6, 2007 by Genius Entertainment, with no extras. The film was re-released to DVD on July 22, 2008 as one of three films included on the first volume of the "Maneater Series Collection" film sets. The other two films were Blood Monkey and Maneater, the first and third films in the series, respectively.

== Reception ==
Jeff Swindol, of Monsters and Critics said that "the film is crap and that you get the impression that one or the other used the same screenplay and one was with spiders and the other with monkeys since the supporting players are all archetypes." Alex Hanson, of Chud.com, said that it was a mistake that he watched the film, hoping to be at least a little entertained. Scott Weinberg, of FEARnet, said that the film is amazingly, stunningly bad in every possible respect—and is therefore frequently hilarious, and possibly worthy of a look the next time it pops up on the Sci-Fi Channel.
