= ReBoot: The Guardian Code =

2018 reimagining of 1994's computer-animated TV series ReBoot

- Also known as: ReBoot: TGC
- Genre: Science fiction; Action-adventure; Teen drama; Cyberpunk
- Created by: Michael Hefferon
- Based on: ReBoot by: Gavin Blair; Ian Pearson; Phil Mitchell; John Grace
- Developed by: Sean Jara
- Directed by: Pat Williams; Michael Dowding
- Starring: Ty Wood; Sydney Scotia; Ajay Parikh-Friese; Gabriel Darku
- Composer: Rich Walters
- Country of origin: Canada
- Original language: English
- No. of seasons: 1 (YTV) / 2 (Netflix)
- No. of episodes: 20

Production
- Executive producers: Michael Hefferon; Larry Raskin; Kim Dent Wilder; Bryant Pike
- Producer: Michael Hefferon
- Cinematography: Vincent De Paula
- Editors: Simon Davidson; Colin Adams
- Production companies: Mainframe Studios; Reboot Productions; Corus Entertainment

Original release
- Network: YTV (Canada); Netflix (International)
- Release: March 30 – September 28, 2018

ReBoot: The Guardian Code is a Canadian teen drama science fiction live-action/CGI-animated television series produced by Mainframe Studios. Originally announced in 2013, the ten-episode first "season" debuted on Netflix worldwide (outside of Canada) on March 30, 2018, followed by a ten-episode second and final "season" on September 28. YTV aired all twenty episodes from June 4 to July 5, 2018.

== Plot ==
Four teenaged gamers, who are members of an online game's highest-scoring team, meet in person on their first day at Alan Turing High School. Their enrollment was arranged by Vera, an artificial intelligence who has recruited the team as "Guardians" to physically enter and protect cyberspace. Early in the series, Vera is given a human body and locked out of cyberspace, so she enrolls as an exchange student. The Guardians battle the Sourcerer, a human hacker. Dark code is the Sourcerer's primary weapon against the world's computer systems. After his initial run-in with the Guardians, the Sourcerer reactivates the computer virus named Megabyte, the main antagonist of the original ReBoot, to help him from inside cyberspace.

== Cast ==
- Guardians, high school students who physically enter cyberspace under pseudonyms to fight viruses and hackers:
  - Ty Wood as Austin Carter, a.k.a. Vector, the leader of the team whose color is red and is the son of Adam Carter/Sourcerer.
  - Sydney Scotia as Tamra, a.k.a. Enigma, the agility like ninja of the team whose color is yellow.
  - Ajay Friese as Parker, a.k.a. Googz, the brains of the team and a hacker in the internet, his color is green.
  - Gabriel Darku as Trey Davies, a.k.a. D-Frag, the muscle of the team who is an athlete in the real world and a hulking strong man in cyberspace, his color is blue.
- Hannah Vandenbygaart as V.E.R.A. (Virtual Evolutionary Recombinary Avatar), an artificial intelligence given a human body in the first episode, and the Guardians' leader.
- Bob Frazer as Adam Carter, Austin's father, who became infected by dark code and turned into the Sourcerer, an evil hacker trying to send the world back to the Dark Ages or the early 1900s, before everything was working with computers. He is Megabyte's master.
- Kirsten Robek as Judy Carter, Austin's mother, who is unaware of her son's guardian double life.
- Luvia Petersen as Special Agent Nance, an agent at the Department of Internet Security (DIS), she once threatened Adam Carter into giving up his information in the mainframe. She wishes to weaponize the Guardian tech so DIS can destroy computers of America's enemies.
- Nicholas Lea as Mark Rowan, an agent at the Department of Internet Security and a friend of Adam Carter.
- Timothy E. Brummund as Megabyte (voice), a virus from the original series, is the Sourcerer's servant. Due to the fact he is over 20 years out of date, Megabyte was upgraded by the Sourcerer upon reactivation. He was previously voiced by Tony Jay in the original series.
- Alex Zahara as the Alpha Sentinels (voice), Megabyte's lead minion at any given time. Megabyte destroys one an episode even if they carry out his orders flawlessly.
- Shirley Millner as Hexadecimal (voice), a virus from the original series and Megabyte's sister, who was later imprisoned by the guardians to Viruslym, she was later freed by Megabyte. Unlike her brother, Hex is chaos incarnate and wishes to turn cyberspace upside down.

== Episodes ==
=== Season 1 (YTV) (2018) ===
==== Season 1 (Netflix) (2018) ====
No. overall	No. in season	Title	Directed by	Written by	Original release date
1	1	"Activation"	Pat Williams	Sean Jara, Mike Kiss and Larry Raskin	30 March 2018 4 June 2018 (CAN)
On their first day of high school, Austin, Tamra, Parker, and Trey discover they are chosen to protect cyberspace as the next generation of Guardians by a Virtual Evolutionary Recombinant Avatar (VERA). Following their first battle with the villainous hacker, the Sourceror, who uses cyber locusts to cause a power outage, an accident materializes VERA as a teenage human girl who cannot return to cyberspace.
2	2	"Resurrection"	Pat Williams	Ann Austen	30 March 2018 5 June 2018 (CAN)
While Vera adjusts to life as a teenager, the Sourcerer finds and reanimates an old enemy from the original ReBoot series, the virus Megabyte. The Sourcerer abducts Megabyte from Mainframe, the setting of ReBoot, and forces him into servitude, giving him an upgraded body.
3	3	"Fortress Command"	Pat Williams	Mike Kiss and Ryan W. Smith	30 March 2018 6 June 2018 (CAN)
Parker gives himself an unauthorized weapons upgrade and enters a mobile game to test it. Megabyte follows and takes over the game, turning its fortress into his new headquarters, before starting to build his sentinel army. The other Guardians rescue Parker and they agree to never go into cyberspace alone.
4	4	"Catastrophic"	Pat Williams	Rachel Langer and Shevon Singh	30 March 2018 7 June 2018 (CAN)
Megabyte delivers a deceptively cute cat virus that launches annoying videos across the Internet, using the distraction to aid the Sourcerer in disabling the security of a computer building in the real world. This allows the Sourcerer to steal the powerful Nova X3J computer, which will allow him to conduct untraceable cyber attacks. From the news of the theft, the Guardians learn of the hacker's existence and that Megabyte works for him.
5	5	"Discoveries"	Pat Williams	Ryan W. Smith	30 March 2018 10 June 2018 (CAN)
A mysterious sphere found in cyberspace reveals that Austin's father, Adam, created the Guardian Code, sending Austin and Parker on a mission to look for more such spheres. While tracking one, they discover that Megabyte stole a software replicator to clone his army, but they lose the new sphere in his fortress.
6	6	"Emotional Rescue"	Pat Williams	Jeremy Smith and Matt Venables	30 March 2018 11 June 2018 (CAN)
Vera installs a teenage emotion plug-in to better understand humans, but her mood swings jeopardize a mission. The Guardians must confront Megabyte, who attacks a bank transaction terminal as part of the Sourcerer's plan to cause millions to lose their money. The government's Department of Internet Security (DIS) is introduced; they track the Sourcerer's activities and find traces of Megabyte and the Guardians.
7	7	"Game Day"	Pat Williams	Jeremy Smith and Matt Venables	30 March 2018 12 June 2018 (CAN)
When the other Guardians discover Megabyte has begun replicating himself, Trey abandons his basketball team in mid-game to help his friends; his father does not approve, unaware of his double life as a Guardian. Following the battle, the Sourcerer learns that the Guardians are humans in cyberspace.
8	8	"Artificial Intelligence"	Pat Williams	Rachel Langer	30 March 2018 13 June 2018 (CAN)
The Sourcerer hacks and controls Alyx, a ubiquitous virtual assistant, to cause chaos and eliminate the Guardians in a trap. In the end, Vera talks Alyx into rejecting the dark code to save her reputation.
9	9	"Datastorm"	Pat Williams	Sean Jara and Shevon Singh	30 March 2018 18 June 2018 (CAN)
The Sourcerer hacks a military weather satellite and uses it to control of a hurricane in order to destroy the country's west coast. The Guardians stop him. Austin learns that his mom is dating his father's old roommate Rowan, who unbeknownst to them is a DIS agent.
10	10	"Mainframe Mayhem"	Pat Williams	Mark Leiren-Young	30 March 2018 19 June 2018 (CAN)
Megabyte returns to the system of Mainframe, the setting of the original ReBoot series, to recruit his sister Hexadecimal. The Guardians follow and meet Mainframe's Guardian, Bob, and his friends. A user initiates a game, which the new Guardians help Bob win. Vera begins helping Trey study for his classes, which leads Parker to suspect that they are dating.

==== Season 2 (Netflix) (2018) ====
No. overall	No. in season	Title	Directed by	Written by	Original release date
11	1	"Network Interference"	Pat Williams	Mark Leiren-Young	28 September 2018 20 June 2018 (CAN)
The Sourcerer hacks into the Dyna-Cell network, so that he can tap into cell phones to search for the Guardians. As Megabyte aids his master, Hexadecimal accompanies him but jeopardizes the mission. Meanwhile, Vera discovers the Sourcerer has compromised Parker's cell phone. The Guardians capture Hexadecimal and send her to Virusylum. They discover that the DIS is connected to Adam Carter's past and that the spheres contain Adam's memories regarding the Guardian Code.
12	2	"Zombie Army"	Pat Williams	Sam Ruano	28 September 2018 21 June 2018 (CAN)
The Sourcerer manufactures a robot zombie army in cyberspace to infiltrate unprotected computers around the world and launch a massive distributed denial-of-service attack to crash the Internet. Meanwhile, Parker and Austin discover that Judy's boyfriend Rowan works for the DIS and that DIS Agent Nance had threatened Adam one year earlier. Following the Sourcerer's defeat, Rowan gives the Guardians a flash drive with the surviving research from Adam's computer, but they distrust the DIS when they find a surveillance device on it.
13	3	"Bee-Ware"	Pat Williams	Jennica Harper	28 September 2018 25 June 2018 (CAN)
To prove his worth to the Sourcerer amid constant threats of deletion, Megabyte infects a line of bee toys in order to scare children around the world. The Guardians stop him, but the Sourcerer learns their identities and instructs Megabyte to capture them and gain access to their technology.
14	4	"Share Scare"	Pat Williams	Amy Benham	28 September 2018 26 June 2018 (CAN)
Tamra accidentally uploads a video of Vera rapping about herself and the Guardians, and her classmate Shari shares the sensitive information. The Guardians manage to intercept the video before anyone else sees it. Parker learns that Vera's "dates" with Trey really were to help him study. At the DIS headquarters, Agent Nance recognizes the Guardian Code as Adam's work and she becomes intent on finding the Guardians and taking their tech by force. Vera's rap in this episode was featured in a promotional music video released on May 25, a month before the show's Canadian premiere, on YTV's website and YouTube channel.
15	5	"Nuclear Confusion"	Pat Williams	Jeremy Smith and Matt Venables	28 September 2018 27 June 2018 (CAN)
Rowan has learned the Guardians' identities, but withholds this from the DIS. He asks for the Guardians help when the Sourcerer hacks the DIS computers, taking over their security drones and attempting to launch a nuclear warhead. Sourcerer also uses the Nova X3J to speed up the decoding process. Parker resets the code sequencer just before the Sourcerer cracks the launch code and the DIS purges its system of his dark code.
16	6	"Double Trouble"	Pat Williams	Larry Raskin and Todd Ireland	28 September 2018 28 June 2018 (CAN)
While Tamra is away, Shari discovers the Guardians' secret base in the school's basement; mistaking it for a virtual-reality game club, she enters cyberspace as Enigma, Tamra's Guardian avatar. The remaining Guardians pursue her, but Megabyte captures them all and they meet the Sourcerer, who extracts data from Shari's avatar. Vera beams Tamra in as a backup of Enigma and all five escape, while Megabyte tricks the Sourcerer and liberates himself from the delete code. Vera erases Shari's memories of the event, while the Sourcerer learns about Alan Turing High School from Shari's data.
17	7	"Mega-Viral"	Pat Williams	Ann Austen	28 September 2018 2 July 2018 (CAN)
Freed from the Sourcerer's delete code, Megabyte attempts to hijack all the world's social media, frightening the users her contacts. Before the Guardians can enact a plan, Agent Nance sends DIS drones against them and captures Megabyte. However, while in Virusylum, Hexadecimal offers Megabyte an opportunity for revenge; he reluctantly accepts. Meanwhile, the Sourcerer begins a physical journey to Alan Turing High School.
18	8	"Great Escapes"	Pat Williams	Sam Ruano	28 September 2018 3 July 2018 (CAN)
Megabyte's sentinels break him and Hexadecimal out of Virusylum. Before the Guardians can enact a plan, DIS drones intercept them so that Nance can check whether the Guardians are humans using Adam's Guardian Code. At the end of the episode, the Sourcerer breaks into the school after class hours.
19	9	"Identity Theft"	Pat Williams	Todd Ireland	28 September 2018 4 July 2018 (CAN)
The Sourcerer discovers the Guardians' secret base and Austin recognizes him as Adam, his father, who was thought to have died in a fire. Nance has Austin detained but Rowan secretly frees him, so that Austin can join the other Guardians to fight identity-theft pirates. They find a memory sphere revealing that Adam faked his death to protect his family from Agent Nance, then entered cyberspace to study dark code for a year. Ultimately, they learn that dark code attacked and infected him, creating an alternate personality as the Sourcerer.
20	10	"Black Hole"	Pat Williams	Larry Raskin	28 September 2018 5 July 2018 (CAN)
The Sourcerer uses Austin's feelings toward his father to lead him into their secret base, from where he enters cyberspace and attempts to destroy the Internet with a cyber black hole. Adam struggles for control as the Sourcerer fights the Guardians, and sacrifices his life to save them and the Internet. Austin believes there's a chance Adam survived. Megabyte and Hexadecimal return to Megabyte's fortress with a larger army. The DIS discovers that the Nova X3J computer has gone missing.

== Development ==
On October 3, 2013, Rainmaker announced the development of a new ReBoot television series alongside the reintroduction of the Mainframe company brand for its small screen productions. Speaking to Canada.com later that month, Rainmaker's president and Chief Creative Officer Michael Hefferon stated that the show wouldn't be the same as the "world of technology has changed drastically in the 20 years from when ReBoot first started" and cautioned that the original show's characters would likely be limited to cameo appearances. He then said that the company planned to pitch the series in February, with the hope of getting YTV on board as the broadcast partner.

In November 2014, Rainmaker revealed the show would be called ReBoot: The Guardian Code. The following May, Deadline reported the series would be a live-action/CG-animated hybrid distributed by The Weinstein Company. On June 8, 2015, Corus Entertainment, owners of YTV, ordered a 26-episode first season, stating that the series was created by Hefferon and confirming the details of the Deadline story. Shortly after, various characters from the original series, including Bob, Dot, Enzo and Megabyte, were confirmed to appear in the series, though focus had shifted to a group of four teenagers recruited into protecting cyberspace by the Guardian program V.E.R.A. The four teens were named as Austin, Parker, Trey and Tamra. A poster showcasing Austin in his guardian form was released. Commenting on the inclusion of live-action material in the series, Hefferon stated, "I talked with broadcasters around the world. The one [resounding] thing — and I hate to break it to the fans — was nobody wanted the reboot of what [the show originally] was. Nobody was willing to buy it." He later added that two thirds of an average episode would be animated content. At the time, the series was planned for a late 2016/early 2017 launch.

== Production ==
Casting calls for the series went out in May 2016. They listed a shoot date between August and November of that year in Vancouver, British Columbia, with YTV attached as the broadcast partner and the episode count reduced to 20. Production was delayed with filming taking place in British Columbia in February and March 2017.

On March 28, 2017, Corus confirmed the information revealed in the casting calls and announced the show's executive staff and main cast. Worldwide distribution, licensing, and merchandising rights had moved to Corus's Nelvana Enterprises with YTV set to debut the series in 2018. A mobile virtual reality experience and digital trading card game were confirmed to be in development. Rainmaker's parent company Wow Unlimited Media reported that the first 8 episodes of the series had been delivered to broadcast partners in the third quarter of 2017, with the remaining 12 scheduled for the fourth quarter of that year.

ReBoot: The Guardian Code is modeled, rigged, and animated in Autodesk Maya, and rendered in 4K resolution using Unreal Engine 4. Hefferon stated that using Unreal gave them an advantage in speed: "Some of these shots could have taken 3 to 13 hours in a traditional pipeline, per frame," whereas Unreal rendered each frame in seconds or minutes. It also easily allowed the crew to reuse animation assets for the virtual reality tie-in.

=== Casting ===
Ty Wood, Sydney Scotia, Ajay Parikh-Friese and Gabriel Darku were cast as group of teenagers who enter Mainframe to protect the virtual and real world from viruses such as Megabyte.

Three voice actors from the original series reprise their voice roles in this series: Michael Benyaer returns as Bob, Kathleen Barr as Dot and Shirley Millner as Hexadecimal. Timothy E. Brummund replaces Tony Jay as Megabyte due to the original actor's death in 2006.

== Distribution ==
A trailer for the series and the virtual reality experience debuted on February 21, 2018. The ten-episode first "season" debuted on Netflix globally, excluding Canada, on March 30, followed by a ten-episode second and final "season" on September 28. All twenty episodes aired on YTV in Canada between June 4 and July 5.

== Other media ==
Following the debut of the show's first 10 episodes on Netflix, the official ReBoot: The Guardian Code YouTube channel uploaded a series of 10 one-minute virtual reality shorts. Similarly, YTV released a series of live-action shorts featuring the characters from the show alongside the Canadian broadcast. A number of these shorts are directly tied to events in the series.

A free-to-play mobile game, titled ReBoot: The Guardian Code – Code Hacker was released for iOS and Android devices on March 22, 2018. Developed by A.C.R.O.N.Y.M. Digital, the game is a match-5 puzzle title that features audio detection technology allowing users watching the YTV broadcast to unlock in-game cards. A web-browser version was also hosted on the official website for the series, as well as on YTV's site. As of January 5, 2022 the mobile game is no longer on the Google Play Store.

== Reception ==
=== Pre-release ===
On February 21, 2018, an official trailer was released. It was not well received; by March 10, 2018, the trailer had reached 12,000 dislikes and 983 likes on YouTube.

On February 25, 2018, the French website Codelyoko.fr, a fansite for the TV show Code Lyoko, published a negative review of the trailer. The review accused ReBoot: The Guardian Code of plagiarizing Code Lyoko, as the trailer showed many similarities to Code Lyoko's premise and characters. Shamus Kelley from Den of Geek! also noticed the similarities, claiming that "ReBoot: The Guardian Code is going for the whole Code Lyoko thing" and added that "There isn't a single reference to the old series outside of the term Guardians. It feels more like a teen drama with elements from Code Lyoko and Superhuman Samurai Syber-Squad." Another concurring opinion came from Digital Spy writer Jon Anderton, who claimed that the original show "took place inside a computer system and there was no schoolkid element, making The Guardian Code more similar to 2000's series Code Lyoko (or Tron, to use a more mainstream example)". Shortly after the trailer's release, Code Lyoko co-creator Thomas Romain responded to the official ReBoot: The Guardian Code Twitter account, stating, "Wow you really liked Code Lyoko, didn’t you?" The Guardian Code has also been seen as a derivative of Zixx, an earlier CG/live-action TV show Rainmaker helped produce.

=== Release ===
Reviewing the first ten episodes of the series for Collider, Dave Trumbore had mixed feelings, giving the show a 2-star rating. While he praised the performance of Hannah Vandenbygaart, the character interactions and most of the visual aesthetic, he felt the show's animation was of poor quality for a 2018 series. He criticized the writing, acting and camerawork, saying that it is "stuck in the mid-'90s." His biggest issue was the show's pacing, commenting that the series took too long to introduce emotional moments and callbacks to the original show.

Emily Ashby awarded the show 3 stars in her review for Common Sense Media. She felt the show had a number of positive role models for kids and while the series wasn't educational in nature, its use of technology could spur interest in STEM fields.

Shamus Kelley of Den of Geek! was especially critical of the tenth episode, describing it as "one of the worst episodes of television" he has ever seen. He derided the decision to include a character mocking fans and felt the cameos from the original characters were superficial. Conversely, io9's Charles Pulliam-Moore found it to be the only episode of the first ten to be worth watching. Calling it "legitimately fantastic," he enjoyed the appearance of characters from the original series and said "you can get away with not watching the rest of the season, jumping to the finale, and actually having a good time."
