= Without Rockets =

- Directed by: Gary Yates
- Written by: Gary Yates; Keith Tomasek
- Produced by: Keith Tomasek
- Starring: Ted Felbel
- Cinematography: Michael Marshall
- Edited by: Gary Yates
- Music by: Stephen Arndt
- Release date: April 4, 1994
- Running time: 12 minutes
- Country: Canada
- Language: English

Without Rockets is a Canadian comedy-drama short film, written and directed by Gary Yates and released in 1994. The film stars Ted Felbel as Fred, a lonely older man living in isolation near an abandoned missile base in northern Manitoba, who tries to come up with a new way to bury his pet pig after the animal dies but the ground is too frozen to dig a hole.

The film premiered in Winnipeg in April 1994, as the opening film to screenings of The Wedding Banquet.

The film was a Genie Award nominee for Best Theatrical Short Film at the 15th Genie Awards in 1994.
