= Hellhounds (film) =

- DVD Cover
- Genre: Horror
- Written by: Paul A. Birkett; Jason Bourque
- Directed by: Ricky Schroder
- Starring: Scott Elrod; Adam Butcher; Amanda Brooks
- Theme music composer: Luc St. Pierre
- Country of origin: Canada
- Original language: English

Production
- Producer: Ric Nish
- Cinematography: Pierre Jodoin
- Editor: Simon Webb
- Production companies: Muse Entertainment Enterprises; RHI Entertainment

Original release
- Network: Syfy
- Release: July 19, 2009

Hellhounds is a 2009 Canadian horror film directed by Ricky Schroder. The film was shot in Romania. It is the twenty-first film in the Maneater film series.

== Plot ==
The warrior Kleitos marries the princess Demetria. Kleitos' friend Theron kills Demetria out of jealousy, which sends her to the underworld. Kleitos gathers a group of warriors to head to the underworld in order to rescue Demetria. They manage to free the princess from Hades, but they are attacked by hellhounds under Theron's control once they go back to their world.

== Production ==
Amanda Brooks heard about the role through her agent, who is friends with the director. The film was shot completely in Romania, including Transylvania and Bucharest. Some scenes were filmed in a real volcano. Brooks said of the filming, "I mean, we were on a tight budget, we were filming long hours ... Ricky and the other cast, we must have laughed 75 percent of the time. It was just a really good group."

== Reception ==
Peter Hartlaub, writing for San Francisco Chronicle, said, "Despite the fact that three huge dogs are pictured on the cover, two hellhounds appear in the movie – and they're only a little bit bigger than regular dogs. 'Silver Spoons' was scarier than this." A reviewer for Dread Central said, "A pack of satanic Marmadukes would have been more frightening." Justin Felix of DVD Talk wrote, "Rent it, if you're a fan of the Maneater series and like this sort of thing. (I can honestly say I've seen worse from the series.) All others can safely skip it."

== Home video ==
The film was released on DVD in February 2010. There is an English language track, but no other languages or subtitles are available. The only special features are three trailers for other films in the Syfy Maneater Series.
