= Chris Norman =

English soft rock singer (born 1950)

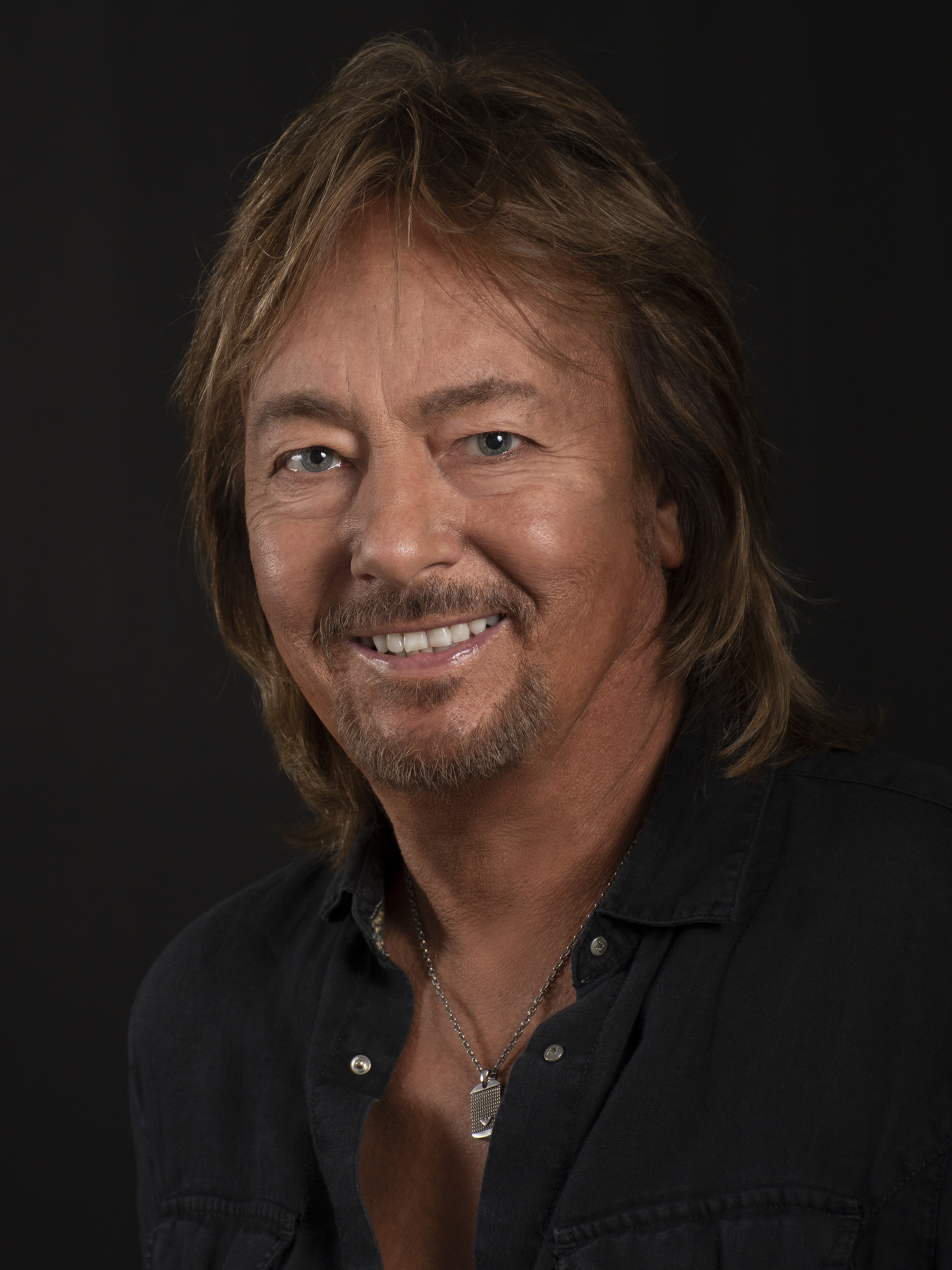
- Norman in 2020

Background information
- Born: Christopher Ward Norman; 25 October 1950 (age 76); Redcar, North Yorkshire, England
- Genres: Soft rock; glam rock
- Occupations: Musician; songwriter
- Instruments: Vocals; guitar; keyboards
- Years active: 1964–present
- Labels: BMG; Edel
- Formerly of: Smokie; Chris Norman Band
- Website: www.chris-norman.co.uk

Christopher Ward Norman (born 25 October 1950) is an English soft rock singer. Norman was the original lead singer of the English rock band Smokie (1964–1986), which found success in Europe in the 1970s. "Stumblin' In", a 1978 duet with Suzi Quatro, became a big hit in the United States and Europe. The single "Midnight Lady" also became an international hit. In the 1990-2000s, he toured the countries of Eastern Europe; he is most popular in the Baltic countries.

== Life and career ==
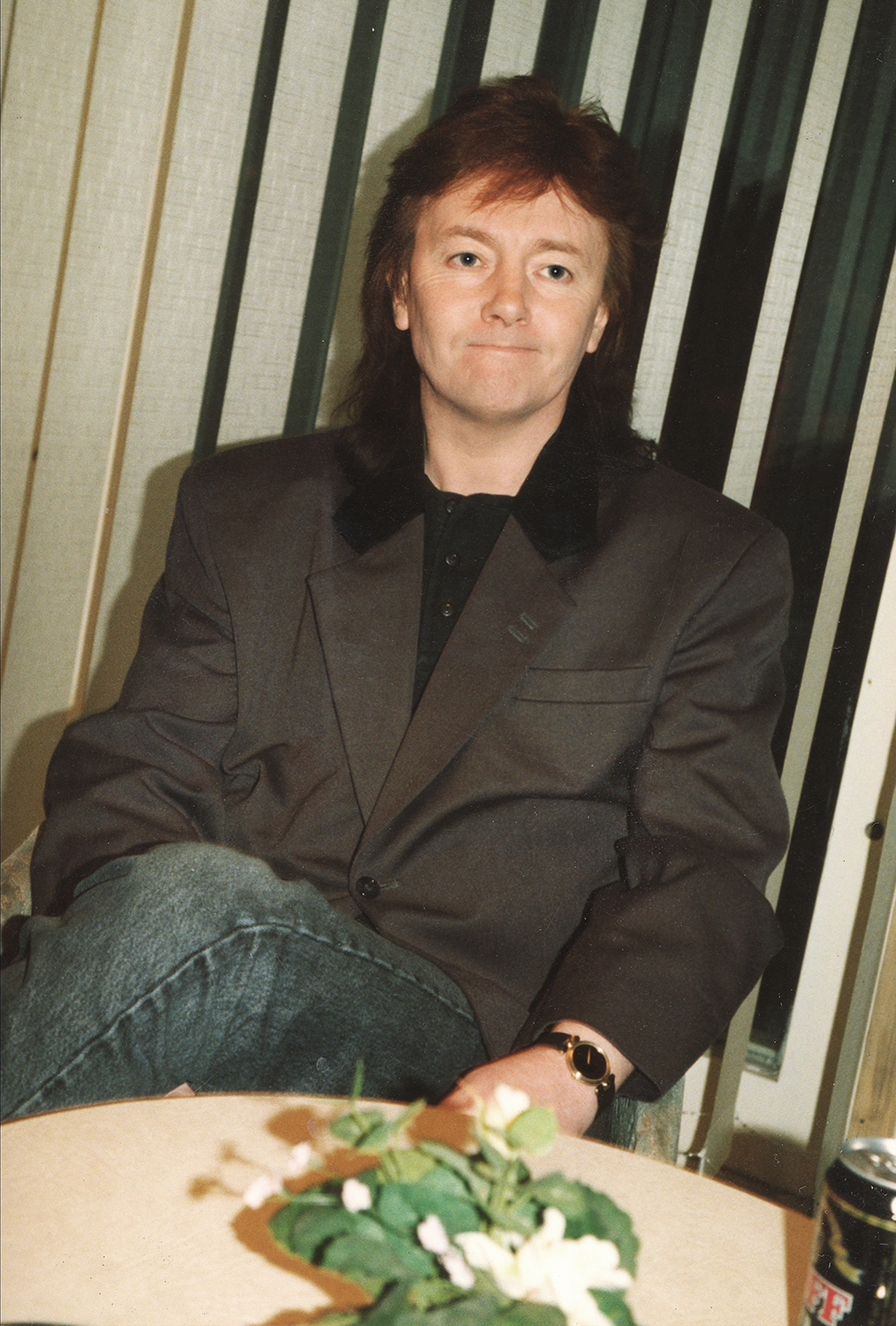
Chris Norman in Tallinn, Estonia, in 1995

Norman acquired his first guitar at the age of seven. His early musical influences were Elvis Presley, Little Richard, Otis Redding, and Lonnie Donegan.

In these early years, Norman's parents moved around the country a lot, which resulted in him going to nine different schools, and living in various locations around England, such as Redcar, Luton, Kimpton, and Nottingham. By 1962, however, the family had moved back to Norman's mother's home city of Bradford. Approaching his 12th birthday, Norman started at St. Bede's Grammar School, where he met Alan Silson and Terry Uttley, future members of Smokie. As teenagers, influenced by the new era of groups such as the Beatles and the Rolling Stones and then folk singer, Bob Dylan, Norman and Silson began meeting up and spent nearly all their spare time learning new songs on their guitars. They managed to persuade Uttley to join them and, along with a drummer friend called Ron Kelly, they formed their first band. The Yen, Essence, and Long Side Down were just some of a variety of names they called themselves before settling on "The Elizabethans". When Ron Kelly left the group in 1973, an old friend called Pete Spencer was asked to take over on the drums, and the group, which was to become Smokie, was complete. In 1970, Norman married his wife, Linda, and they have five children together. Since 1986, they have resided on the Isle of Man.

Between 1974 and the early 1980s, Smokie enjoyed success touring all over the world, but the strain and pressure of constantly being away from home and family was beginning to tell on Norman. By the early 1980s, he decided to spend more time writing and working in the studio. Norman and Spencer then worked together on songs for other artists including hits for Kevin Keegan ("Head Over Heels in Love", a number-31 UK hit), and the England football team song "This Time (We'll Get It Right)". He also worked with Agnetha Fältskog (on her solo album), Racey (co-writer of "Baby It's You"), Donovan (backing vocals on Donovan), and Heavy Metal Kids.

In 1978, Norman recorded a duet with Suzi Quatro, "Stumblin' In", which made number four on the US Billboard Hot 100 and sold over one million copies.

Norman's solo career took off in 1986 with the song, "Midnight Lady", which was a hit throughout Europe, holding the number-one spot in Germany for six weeks (where it sold 900,000 copies). Further success followed by the songs "Some Hearts Are Diamonds", "No Arms Can Ever Hold You", "Broken Heroes", "Fearless Hearts", "Sarah", and "Baby I Miss You". In 1994, Norman was honoured by CMT Europe as their International Video Star of the Year. In 2004, he took part in the Comeback Show on the German TV station ProSieben, and he performed "Stumblin' In" as a duet with C. C. Catch. In the final episode of the show, he was joined by Smokie for the final song.

On 2 June 2007, Norman performed at the Peel Bay Festival, Isle of Man.

In July 2017, he performed at the Rendezvous music festival in Jūrmala.

In 2019, he was the headliner of the White Nights music festival in St. Petersburg, the festival was a tribute to the 50-year career of Alla Pugacheva. Also headlining were Level 42, Bonnie Tyler, and Svetlana Loboda,

== Discography ==
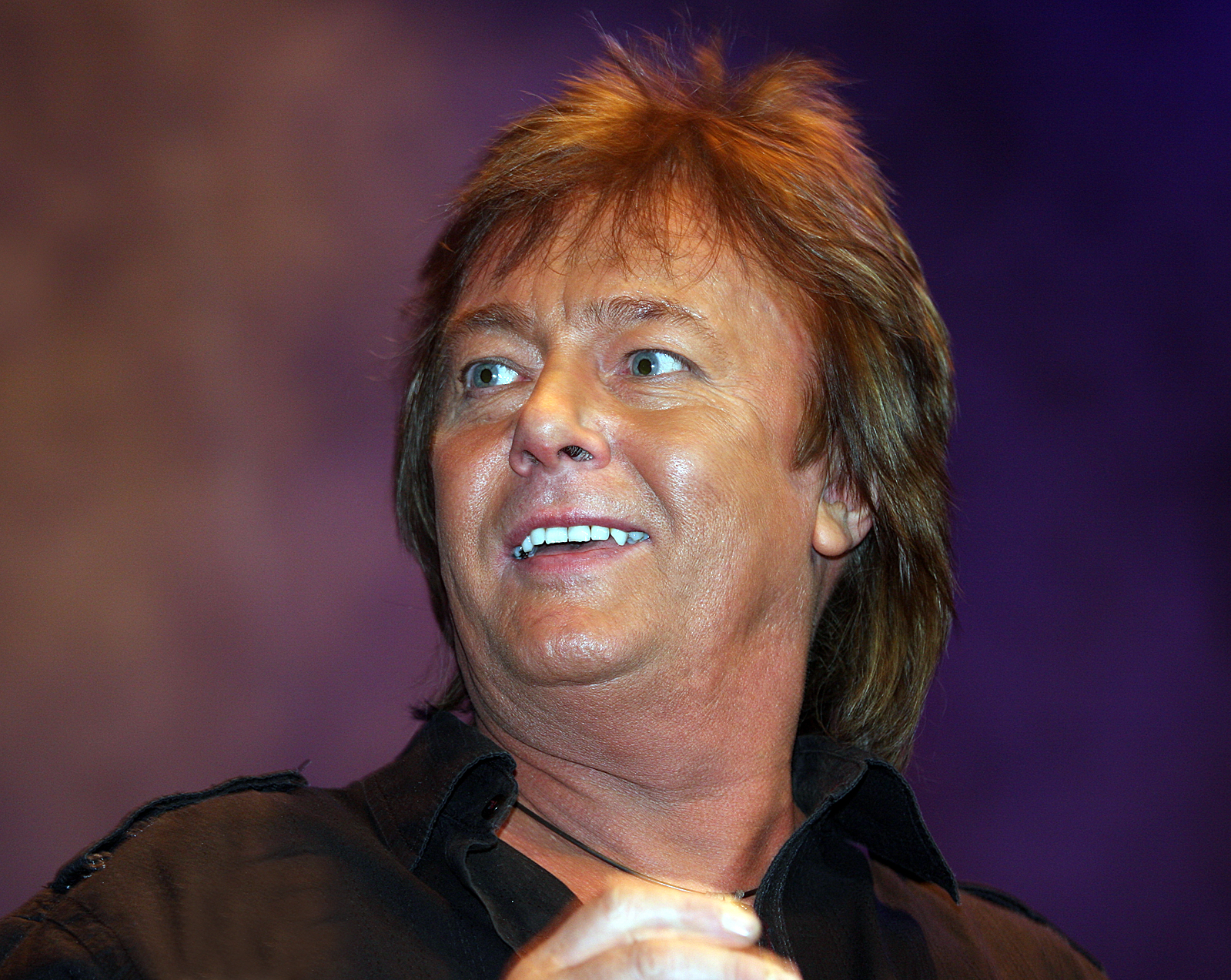
Norman in 2008

- Rock Away Your Teardrops (1982)
- Some Hearts Are Diamonds (1986)
- Different Shades (1987)
- Break the Ice (1989)
- Interchange (1991)
- The Growing Years (1992)
- The Album (1994)
- Reflections (1995)
- Into the Night (1997)
- Christmas Together (1997)
- Full Circle (2000)
- Breathe Me In (2001)
- Handmade (2003)
- Break Away (2004)
- Million Miles (2006)
- Close Up (2007)
- Time Traveller (2011)
- There and Back (2013)
- Crossover (2015)
- Don't Knock the Rock (2017)
- Just a Man (2021)
- Junction 55 (2024)
- Lifelines (2026)

== Industry awards ==
Year	Nominee / work	Award	Result
1986	"Midnight Lady"	Goldene Europa Comeback des Jahres	Won
1986	Best Male Singer	Bravo Otto - Best Male Singer (Bronze)	Won
1986	Himself	Löwe von Radio Luxembourg Silver Award	Won
1986	Male Singer	Gold Hammerschlumpf - Pop/Rocky	Won
1994	"Jealous Heart"	CMT Europe International Video Star of the Year	Won
2001	Himself	Gala zur Verleihung des Internationalen Schlagerpreises	Won
2004	Himself	Radio Regenbogen Award	Won

Billboard Year End Charts 1979

Nominee/work	Year End Charts	Result
"Stumblin' In"	Top Singles	23rd place
Suzi Quatro and Chris Norman	Top singles Artists	50th place
Suzi Quatro and Chris Norman	Top New Duo	4th place
"Stumblin' In"	Top Single Duos	3rd place
Suzi Quatro and Chris Norman	Top Adult Contemporary Singles	28th place
Suzi Quatro and Chris Norman	Top Overall Pop Duos	11th place

Cashbox Year End Awards 1979

Nominee/work	Year End Awards	Result
"Stumblin' In"	Top 100 Singles	62nd place
Suzi Quatro and Chris Norman	Top Duo	4th place

Record World Year End Awards 1979

Nominee/work	Year End Awards	Result
"Stumblin' In"	Top Single Duo	4th place
Suzi Quatro and Chris Norman	Top Duo	3rd place
Suzi Quatro and Chris Norman	Top New Duo	2nd place
Suzi Quatro and Chris Norman	Top Mixed Duo (Male/Female)	2nd place
