= Some Hearts Are Diamonds =

Studio album by Chris Norman
- Released: October 1986
- Studio: Studio 33, Hamburg
- Genre: Soft rock
- Length: 37:37
- Label: Hansa
- Producers: Dieter Bohlen, Luis Rodríguez

Singles from Some Hearts Are Diamonds
- 1. "Midnight Lady" Released: 1986; 2. "Some Hearts Are Diamonds" Released: 1986; 3. "No Arms Can Ever Hold You / Hunters of the Night" Released: 1986

Some Hearts Are Diamonds is the second solo album by Chris Norman, released in 1986 by Hansa Records. Dieter Bohlen, formerly of Modern Talking, produced the album and wrote several of the songs.

The lead single, "Midnight Lady", was a number one hit throughout much of Europe.

== Track listing ==
Some Hearts Are Diamonds track listing
No.	Title	Writer(s)	Length
1.	"Some Hearts Are Diamonds"	Dieter Bohlen	3:46
2.	"Hunters of the Night"	Chris Norman, Bohlen	4:06
3.	"Chain Reaction"	Norman, Pete Spencer	3:43
4.	"It's a Tragedy"	Norman, Spencer	3:46
5.	"No Arms Can Ever Hold You"	Bohlen	3:46
6.	"Midnight Lady"	Bohlen	4:12
7.	"Love for Sale"	Norman, Spencer	3:28
8.	"Love Is..."	Bohlen	3:32
9.	"Stop at Nothing"	Norman, Spencer	3:31
10.	"Till the Night We'll Meet Again"	Bohlen	4:13

== Charts ==
Chart performance for Some Hearts Are Diamonds
Chart (1986)	Peak position
Austria (Top 75 Albums)	22
Germany (Top100 Albums)	14
Norway (Top 40 Albums)	9
Switzerland (Albums Top 100)	9
