= Head over Heels in Love (song) =

"Head Over Heels in Love"

Single by Kevin Keegan
- B-side: "Move on Down"
- Released: 9 June 1979
- Genre: Pop; rock
- Length: 3:00
- Label: EMI - 2965
- Songwriters: Chris Norman; Pete Spencer
- Producers: Chris Norman; Pete Spencer

Kevin Keegan singles chronology
"It Ain't Easy" (1972)	"Head Over Heels in Love" (1979)	"England" (1979)

"Head Over Heels in Love" is a song by Kevin Keegan, the former football player and manager. It was released as a single on 9 June 1979 by EMI Records. The single features another original song, "Move on Down" as the B-side, which unlike "Head Over Heels in Love", is more of a hard rock song.

== Background ==
The single peaked at number 31 in the UK singles chart and climbed to number 20 in Austria, and 10 in Germany where Keegan was based at the time, and where co-writer Chris Norman's band Smokie were popular.
