= Floor Thirteen (band) =

Canadian alternative rock band

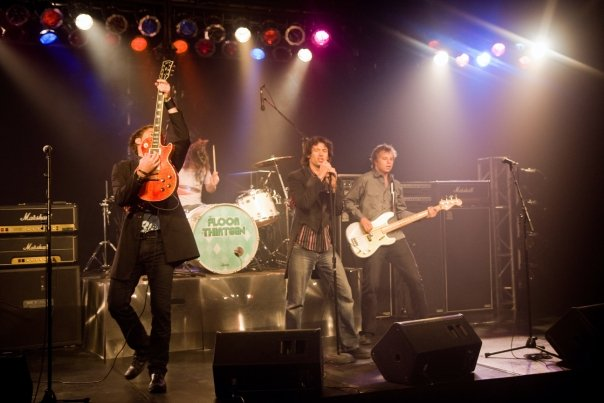
- Floor Thirteen on Arbor Live Season One.

Background information
- Origin: Winnipeg, Manitoba, Canada
- Genre: Alternative rock
- Years active: 1998–2012
- Label: C4
- Members: Jeremy Koz; Marc 'Jaws'; Aaron Vandall; Billy Kiely
- Website: floor13.ca

Floor Thirteen was a Canadian alternative rock band from Winnipeg, Manitoba. The band combined 1960s and 1970s influenced rock and roll with 1990s rock sounds.

== History ==
=== Formation and Mmmm! ===
Floor Thirteen formed in 1998 when drummer Billy Kiely and Marc 'Jaws' Jaworski, who had been jamming together, came together with singer/bassist Aaron Vandall.

Jeremy Koz later joined the group, and Floor Thirteen performed as part of the Powerball concert in Winnipeg in 2005 along with Our Lady Peace and Danko Jones. The band performed at the NXNE festival in 2007.

They entered 441 Studios in Winnipeg with Juno Award-winning producer Brandon Friesen. The resulting album, Mmmm!, was released in 2008, and debuted at number one in Winnipeg record sales for the week of August 10, 2008.

Floor Thirteen's song, "Blame It On Me," was licensed to the video game company EA Games in August, and EA Games placed the song in the games Need For Speed: Undercover and The Sims 3.

In September 2008, the song "Blame It On Me" was played on George Stroumboulopoulos' The Strombo Show. The next month, the band headed to the UK to showcase major industry executives in London's MUSEXPO Europe. Floor Thirteen was also the featured artist on internationally syndicated import radio show, Passport Approved, which has a presence in Germany and the U.K.

In 2012, Floor Thirteen took part in Canada Music Week in Toronto.

== Discography ==
=== Mmmm! (2008) ===
1. "Let it Go" - 4:29
2. "Blame it on Me" - 3:55
3. "Shut 'Em Out" - 3:49
4. "Bite My Nails" - 4:28
5. "Call Me What You Will" - 3:14
6. "Love Until the Money" - 4:05
7. "Road Less Travelled" - 4:15
8. "Running Away" - 3:38
9. "Bright Light Rockin' City" - 3:58
10. "Jenny Lane" - 3:45
11. "Go Home Girl" - 3:49
12. "Night Train" - 3:48

== Band members ==
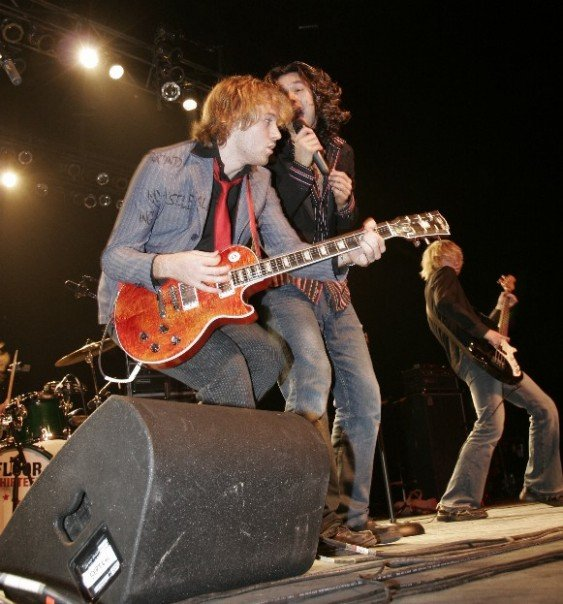
Jaws (left), Koz (center), and Vandall (right) at the MTS Centre in Winnipeg, Manitoba.

- Jeremy Koz – lead vocals (2004–present)
- Marc 'Jaws' Jaworski – lead guitar, backing vocals (1998–present)
- Aaron Vandall – bass guitar, backing vocals (2000–present)
- Billy Kiely – drums, percussion (1998–present)
- Evan Sapach – vocals (2000–2004)
