= Head over Heels =

Head over Heels may refer to:

== Film and television ==
=== Film ===
- Head over Heels (1922 film), a film starring Mabel Normand
- Head over Heels (1937 film), a British musical starring Jessie Matthews
- Head over Heels (1979 film) or Chilly Scenes of Winter, an American drama
- Head over Heels (2001 film), an American romantic comedy
- Head over Heels, a 2007 film nominated for Best Short Animation at the 61st British Academy Film Awards
- Head over Heels (2012 film), an American animated short by Timothy Reckart

=== Television ===
- Head over Heels (American TV series), a 1997 sitcom
- Head over Heels (British TV series), a 1993 comedy-drama series
- Head over Heels (Czech TV series), or Až po uši, a 2014–2018 romantic series
- Head over Heels (South Korean TV series), a 2025 romantic fantasy series

== Music ==
=== Albums ===
- Head over Heels (Chromeo album), 2018
- Head over Heels (Cocteau Twins album), 1983
- Head over Heels (Paula Abdul album), 1995
- Head over Heels (Poco album), 1975

=== Songs ===
- "Head over Heels" (ABBA song), 1982
- "Head over Heels" (Allure song), 1997
- "Head over Heels" (Blue Rodeo song), 1995
- "Head over Heels" (Go-Go's song), 1984
- "Head over Heels" (Tears for Fears song), 1985
- "Head over Heels (In This Life)", by Switchfoot, 2007
- "Head over Heels", by Accept from Balls to the Wall, 1983
- "Head over Heels", by Big Bang from Poetic Terrorism, 2005
- "Head over Heels", by Girlschool from Take a Bite, 1988
- "Head over Heels", by Illustrated Man, 1984
- "Head over Heels", by Midnight Oil from Midnight Oil, 1978
- "Head over Heels", by Nause, 2013
- "Head over Heels", by Runaway June from Blue Roses, 2019
- "Head over Heels", by Tarisai Vushe, 2010
- "Head over Heels", by the Washboard Union, 2016

== Other uses ==
- Head over Heels (musical), a 2015 jukebox musical
- Head over Heels (video game), a 1987 arcade adventure

== See also ==
- Head over Heels in Love (disambiguation)
- Limerence, a state of intense romantic desire for another person
