= Midnight Lady =

Single by Chris Norman

from the album Some Hearts Are Diamonds
- B-side: "Woman"
- Released: 1986
- Recorded: 1985
- Genre: Soft rock
- Label: Hansa, Arista (UK)
- Songwriter(s): Dieter Bohlen
- Producer(s): Dieter Bohlen

"Midnight Lady" is a song by English soft rock musician Chris Norman, released as a single in 1986. The song, produced and written by Dieter Bohlen, one half of Modern Talking, reached number one on the German singles chart in May 1986. Norman is popular in Germany where he scored his most hit records during the 1980s. "Midnight Lady" was also successful in Switzerland and Austria, where it also reached the number one spot. The song also went top 20 in the Netherlands and Belgium, reaching No. 9 and No. 16, respectively.

The song was used in the German crime series Tatort in the 180th episode "Der Tausch".

== Charts ==
Chart performance for "Midnight Lady"
Chart (1986)	Peak position
Austria (Ö3 Austria Top 40)	1
Belgium (Ultratop 50)	16
Europarade Top 30 (Music Week)	3
European Hot 100 Singles (Music & Media)	28
Germany (Media Control Charts)	1
Netherlands (Single Top 100)	9
Switzerland (Swiss Hitparade)	1
