= Eye of the Beast =

2007 film by Gary Yates

- DVD Cover
- Genre: Horror
- Created by: Bullutin Wimpug
- Based on: Isolation (2005 film)
- Written by: Mark Mullin
- Directed by: Gary Yates
- Starring: James Van Der Beek; Alexandra Castillo; Arne MacPherson; Ryan Rajendra Black; Brian Edward Roach; Larissa Tobacco; Kyra Harper; Kelly Wolfman; Ryland Thiessen; Rick Skene; Sharon Bajer; Brooke Palsson; Blake Taylor; Erik Fjeldsted; Stephen Eric McIntyre; Gabriel Daniels; Akulu Meekis; Alicia Johnston; Daina Leitold; Tom Anniko; Adriana O'Neil
- Theme music composer: Jonathan Goldsmith
- Country of origin: Canada
- Original language: English

Production
- Producer: Phyllis Laing
- Cinematography: Michael Marshall
- Editor: Jeff Warren
- Running time: 90 minutes
- Production company: Peace Arch Entertainment Group
- Budget: $2,000,000 (estimated)

Original release
- Network: Syfy
- Release: December 28, 2007

Eye of the Beast is a Canadian monster movie about a young scientist who goes to a small fishing town to find out why fish are not plentiful and ends up in a fight against a giant squid living in Lake Winnipeg. It is the seventh film in the Maneater film series, released on 28 December 2007.

== Plot ==
Robbie and Krissy are enjoying a date off the fictional Fells Island on Lake Winnipeg in a small speedboat. While kissing, a huge tentacle slithers into their boat and wraps onto Krissy's leg. She panics, and Robbie falls overboard. More tentacles emerge and crush the boat, pulling it underwater and tearing Krissy apart. The next day, Krissy's older brother, Will Neepanak, stops to report her missing to Katrina “Kat” Tomas, the acting sheriff for Fells Island. Later, Dan Leland arrives, having been sent from the National Oceanographic Research Agency (NORA) to investigate why fish catches are plummeting. Kat introduces him to Captain Gunner Thorson, Dan's escort, while he researches on the water, to Gunner's dismay. His crew, Jordy and Spider, blame the First Nations fishermen and are openly racist towards the Cree population and Kat, who is half Native. Dan boards Gunner's boat, the Freya, and they set out.

A family of tourists is walking along the beach. The father walks in the rear when a massive tentacle snatches him and pulls him under before his family notices he is gone. They report him missing. Night falls aboard the Freya, and Dan picks up something large on his radar that is not responding to their radio calls. They come upon the wreckage of the speedboat & Robbie, unconscious in a life preserver, pulling him aboard. Robbie is in the advanced stages of hypothermia but tells them of witnessing a monster kill Krissy with his dying breath. Dan pulls bits of the boat aboard and discovers massive toothed sucker marks on the pieces.

Kat is called to the morgue after Gunner returns with Robbie's body. At the morgue, Gunner, Spider, and Jordy try to cover up the attack by saying Robbie was incoherent and by stealing Dan's pieces of the wrecked speedboat, intent on selling them. Dan emails pictures he had taken of the sucker marks to a coworker, Dana Perch, for her opinion on them. Later, he and Kat are walking on the beach and come across the missing tourist's battered torso and another local, Old Salt, pulls up Krissy's leg. He turns it in, and Will is notified. Dan and Kat try to prohibit fishing temporarily while waiting on resources due to the deaths and possibility of a giant squid which angers much of the town. Dan's boss at NORA, Dr. Gorman, denies Dan's request for additional aid and calls his claims of a giant freshwater squid absurd, cutting his funding entirely. He tells Kat, who is devastated, and tries to persuade him to stay, revealing she had seen the beast when it killed her father years before; Dan is not convinced, saying he would need proof of the creature's existence in order to persuade NORA even though he believes her.

Later, the squid attacks Gunner and his wife Jen on the pier, but Gunner cuts the tentacle off and brings it to the bar as proof of the squid. That night, Gunner, Jordy, and Spider start prepping the boat to hunt the squid, refusing the help of Dan, Kat, Will, and his crew, Jack and Ryan. Dan warns them of the dangers, and they agree to work together. Dan and Kat board the Freya, and Will and his crew follow in the Wiiskachaan, planning on netting the squid between the two boats to disorient it after it loses buoyancy. After throwing buckets of chum overboard, the squid is lured to their location, then the Freya's engine dies. The squid attacks the live engine on Will's boat, sinking it and killing Will and his two men aboard, so they change plans to destroy the squid. While it attacks the ship, Kat, Jordy, and Spider fend off the tentacles, and Dan rigs some electrical wire to a harpoon while Gunner fixes the engine. Spider and Jordy are both pulled overboard by the squid and eaten. They finally get the engine running, and when the squid surfaces, they shoot the harpoon into its massive eye and turn on the boat's power, electrocuting it. The Freya heads for the harbor as the sun rises, and Dan and Kat talk about their future together.

== Cast ==
- James Van Der Beek as Dan Leland - a researcher from the National Oceanographic Research Agency (NORA) investigating the recent decline in marine life in the area around Fells Island
- Alexandra Castillo as Katrina "Kat" Tomas - a fishery officer who became the acting sheriff of Fells Island when the previous sheriff unexpectedly died, she is half Cree and many of the town discriminate against her
- Arne McPherson as Gunnar Thorson - "the finest fisherman on the island" and captain of the Freya
- Erik Fjeldsted as Jordy - half of Gunnar's two man crew, he's openly racist toward the native Cree population, blaming them for "overfishing" the lake
- Stephen Eric McIntyre as Spider - the other half of Gunnar's crew
- Ryan Rajendra Black as Will Neepanak (credited as Ryan Black) - Krissy's older brother, a native Cree fisherman and captain of the Wiiskachaan; at one point Kat calls him "cousin"
- Gabriel Daniels as Ryan - half of Will's crew, also Cree
- Akulu Meekis as Jack (credited as Akalu Meekis) - the other half of Will's crew, also Cree
- Brian Edward Roach as Robbie MacGregor (credited as Brian Roach) - on a date with Krissy when the squid attacks
- Larissa Tobacco as Krissy Neepenak, Will's sister - the squid's first victim, gets eaten in the opening scene
- Kyra Harper as Mother Tomas, Katrina's mother - a nurse, she is constantly pressuring Kat to date and settle down
- Kelly Wolfman as Jen Thorson - Gunnar's wife
- Rick Skene as Mr. Connor - the vacationing father and 2nd victim of the squid (not counting Robbie who dies of hypothermia)
- Sharon Bajer as Mrs. Connor - vacationing family
- Ryland Thiessen as James Connor - vacationing family
- Brooke Palsson as Larissa Connor - vacationing family
- Blake Taylor as Old Salt - a local fisherman
- Adriana O'Neil as Dr. Dana Perch (credited as Adrianna O'Neil) - Dan's colleague at NORA
- Tom Anniko as Dr. Gorman - Dan's superior at NORA
- Alicia Johnston as Candace
- Daina Leitold as Lucy

== Critical reception ==
ReelFilm.com included the film among 5 others in a set of "mini reviews" from February 2008. The review is mostly positive albeit short and largely criticizes the film's micro budget although says that despite this, it's a "surprisingly entertaining little monster movie that benefits substantially from some unexpectedly above-average performances". It goes on to praise the film's emphasis on character development and not just creature violence resulting in a film that "comes off as a cut above the usual straight-to-video creature feature" ultimately awarding it 2.5/4 stars.
