= Broken Heroes =

Single by Chris Norman

from the album Hits from the Heart
- Released: 1988
- Genre: Soft rock
- Label: Hansa
- Songwriter(s): Dieter Bohlen
- Producer(s): Dieter Bohlen

"Broken Heroes" is a song by English soft rock musician Chris Norman, released as a single in 1988. It appears as the first track on the 1988 compilation album, Hits from the Heart. The song, produced and written by Dieter Bohlen, one half of Modern Talking, was a top 10 hit in West Germany and Austria, peaking at numbers three and seven, respectively.

"Broken Heroes" was the soundtrack to the German film, Tatort: Gebrochene Blüten.

== Track listing ==
- West German 12" single

A. "Broken Heroes" – 7:31
B1. "Broken Heroes" (instrumental; by Modern Symphonic Orchestra) – 3:27
B2. "Broken Heroes" (radio version) – 3:20

== Charts ==
Chart performance for "Broken Heroes"
Chart (1988)	Peak position
Austria (Ö3 Austria Top 40)	7
West Germany (GfK)	3
