= Some Hearts Are Diamonds (song) =

Single by Chris Norman

from the album Some Hearts Are Diamonds
- B-side: "Till the Night We'll Meet Again"
- Released: 1986
- Genre: Soft rock
- Label: Hansa
- Songwriter(s): Dieter Bohlen
- Producer(s): Dieter Bohlen, Luis Rodríguez

"Some Hearts Are Diamonds" is a song by English soft rock musician Chris Norman, released as a single in 1986. The song is the title track off of his 1986 album of the same name. The song, produced and written by Dieter Bohlen, one half of Modern Talking, was a top 20 hit in Austria, Switzerland and Germany, peaking at numbers 7, 12 and 14, respectively. It is also a radio hit in the Philippines, with several stations playing it.

== Charts ==
Chart performance for "Some Hearts Are Diamonds"
Chart (1986)	Peak position
Austria (Ö3 Austria Top 40)	7
West Germany (GfK)	14
Switzerland (Schweizer Hitparade)	12
