= Gary Yates (director) =

Canadian film director (active 1991–2022)

Gary Yates (born in Montreal, Quebec) is a Canadian film director, producer, and screenwriter. His films include Seven Times Lucky, High Life, Niagara Motel and Taken in Broad Daylight. The latter, released in 2009, starred Sara Canning as Anne Sluti, James Van Der Beek, LeVar Burton, and was based on true events. The film was described as "another woman-In-peril TV movie".

== Awards ==
His short film Without Rockets was a Genie Award nominee for Best Theatrical Short Film at the 15th Genie Awards in 1994.

Yates' films have won eight international awards and been nominated for twelve Genie Awards and six Director's Guild Awards. His feature film Seven Times Lucky premiered at the Sundance Film Festival and won Best Film and Best Screenplay at the Method Fest Film Festival in Los Angeles. His heist-comedy High Life premiered at the Berlin Film Festival. Johanna Schneller named High Life one of the 10 Best Films of 2010.
