= Smokie discography =

- Studio albums: 21
- Live albums: 3
- Compilation albums: 22
- Singles: 54

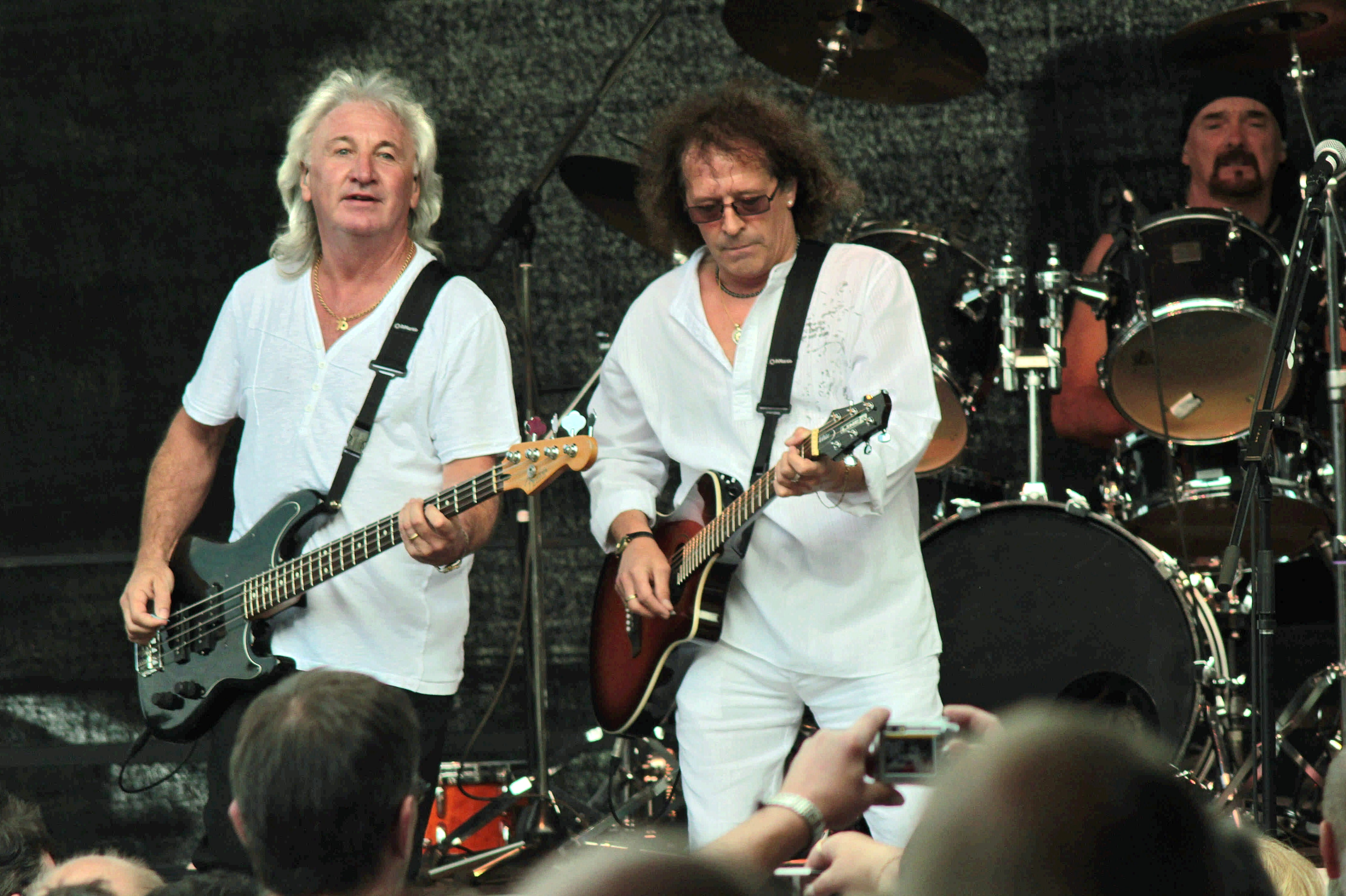
Smokie (an English rock band) in Einsiedel, Germany. Terry Uttley and Mike Craft in the foreground.

British rock band Smokie released 21 studio albums and 54 singles between 1975 and 2010.

== Albums ==
=== Studio albums ===
Title	Album details	Peak chart positions										Sales	Certifications
Title	Album details	UK	AUS	AUT	DEN	FIN	GER	NL	NOR	SWE	US	Sales	Certifications
Pass It Around	Released: 14 February 1975; Label: RAK; Formats: LP, MC	—	94	—	—	—	—	—	—	—	—		
Changing All the Time	Released: September 1975; Label: RAK; Formats: LP, MC	18	—	—	—	—	—	—	—	—	—		BPI: Silver
Midnight Café	Released: 9 April 1976; Label: RAK; Formats: LP, MC	—	—	—	—	—	6	—	12	—	173		
Bright Lights & Back Alleys	Released: 7 October 1977; Label: RAK; Formats: LP, MC	—	36	6	—	3	6	—	1	3	—		BPI: Silver; BVMI: Gold
The Montreux Album	Released: October 1978; Label: RAK; Formats: LP, MC	52	26	6	—	15	3	29	5	3	—		BPI: Silver; BVMI: Gold
The Other Side of the Road	Released: 19 October 1979; Label: RAK; Formats: LP, MC	—	57	7	—	—	17	—	7	26	—		
Solid Ground	Released: 25 September 1981; Label: RAK; Formats: LP, MC	—	—	—	—	—	—	—	31	—	—		
Strangers in Paradise	Released: March 1982; Label: RAK; Formats: LP, MC	—	—	—	—	—	—	—	—	—	—		
Midnight Delight	Released: October 1982; Label: Repertoire; Formats: LP, MC	—	—	—	—	—	—	—	24	—	—		
All Fired Up	Release date: 1988; Label: Wag, Maze Music; Formats: CD, LP, MC; Also released as My Heart Is True	—	—	—	—	—	—	—	8	—	—		
Boulevard of Broken Dreams	Release date: 1989; Label: Wag, Polydor; Formats: CD, LP, MC	—	—	—	—	—	—	—	1	—	—	NOR: 84,691	
Whose Are These Boots?	Release date: 1990; Label: Wag, Polydor; Formats: CD, LP, MC	—	—	—	—	—	—	—	1	—	—	NOR: 73,651	
Chasing Shadows	Release date: 1992; Label: Electrola; Formats: CD, LP, MC	—	—	—	—	—	51	—	6	33	—	NOR: 42,907	
Burnin' Ambition	Release date: 1993; Label: Electrola; Formats: CD, MC	—	—	—	—	—	—	—	—	—	—		
The World and Elsewhere	Release date: October 1995; Label: CMC; Formats: CD, MC	—	—	—	—	—	77	—	8	56	—		IFPI NOR: Platinum
Light a Candle – The Christmas Album	Release date: November 1996; Label: CMC; Formats: CD, MC	—	—	—	—	—	—	—	12	—	—		IFPI NOR: Gold
Wild Horses – The Nashville Album	Release date: March 1998; Label: CMC; Formats: CD, MC	—	—	—	—	—	—	—	19	—	—		
Uncovered	Release date: September 2000; Label: CMC; Formats: CD, MC	—	—	—	3	—	84	—	3	5	—	DEN: 43,892	IFPI DEN: Platinum
Uncovered Too	Release date: October 2001; Label: CMC; Formats: CD, MC	—	—	—	3	—	—	—	14	4	—		GLF: Gold; IFPI DEN: Gold
On the Wire	Release date: August 2004; Label: CMC; Formats: CD	—	—	—	7	—	—	—	12	27	—		
Take a Minute	Release date: 9 August 2010; Label: Black Pelican; Formats: CD	—	—	—	3	—	—	—	6	—	—		
"—" denotes releases that did not chart or were not released in that territory.

=== Live albums ===
Title	Album details	Peak chart positions
Title	Album details	NOR
Greatest Hits Live	Released: November 1988; Label: Polydor; Formats: CD, LP, MC	10
The Concert Live – Essen/Germany 10th March 1978	Released: 1998; Label: BMG Ariola; Formats: CD	—
Live	Released: 1998; Label: CMC; Formats: CD; Live in Denmark	—
"—" denotes releases that did not chart or were not released in that territory.

=== Re-recordings ===
Title	Album details	Peak chart positions					Sales	Certifications
Title	Album details	DEN	GER	NL	NOR	SWE	Sales	Certifications
The Best of Smokie	Released: October 1990; Label: Telstar; Formats: CD, LP, MC; Released in Scandinavia as 18 Carat Gold – The Very Best of Smokie	—	—	23	3	49	NOR: 84,140	BPI: Silver
From Smokie with Love	Released: September 1995; Label: Columbia; Formats: CD, MC	—	49	—	—	—		
Eclipse Acoustic	Released: June 2008; Label: My Way Music; Formats: CD	13	—	—	15	20		
The Greatest Hits Rerecorded 2022	Released: 30 September 2022; Label: Music Manager; Formats: digital download	—	—	—	—	—		
"—" denotes releases that did not chart or were not released in that territory.

=== Compilation albums ===
Title	Album details	Peak chart positions									Sales	Certifications
Title	Album details	UK	AUS	AUT	DEN	FIN	GER	NL	NOR	SWE	Sales	Certifications
Bravo präsentiert Smokie	Released: February 1977; Label: RAK; Formats: LP, MC; Germany-only release	—	—	—	—	—	16	—	—	—		
Greatest Hits	Released: April 1977; Label: RAK; Formats: LP, MC, 8-track	6	—	1	—	1	1	—	1	1	NOR: 195,000	IFPI FIN: Gold; BPI: Silver; BVMI: Platinum; GLF: Gold
The Very Best of Smokie	Released: October 1980; Label: RAK; Formats: LP, MC	23	—	—	—	—	—	—	—	—		BPI: Gold
Greatest Hits Volume 2	Released: October 1980; Label: RAK; Formats: LP, MC	—	77	—	—	—	37	—	—	—		
The Very Best of Smokie	Released: November 1981; Label: Arcade; Formats: LP, MC; Austria and Germany-only release	—	—	5	—	—	16	—	—	—		
I'll Meet You at Midnight – The Very Best of Smokie	Released: December 1981; Label: Arcade; Formats: LP; Netherlands-only release	—	—	—	—	—	—	7	—	—		
All the Best	Released:1981; Label: RAK; Formats: LP, MC; Australasia-only release	—	2	—	—	—	—	—	—	—	AUS: 230,000	
Smokie's Greatest Hits	Released: October 1984; Label: Fame; Formats: LP, MC; Released in Australia as 17 Greatest Hits	—	56	—	—	—	—	—	—	—		
Forever	Release date: September 1990; Label: Ariola; Formats: 2xCD, 2xLP, 2xMC; Europe-only release	—	—	—	3	—	15	—	16	—		
The Best of Smokie & Suzie Quatro	Release date: 1991; Label: Hit Bound; Formats: CD; Australia-only release	—	66	—	—	—	—	—	—	—		
Greatest Hits	Release date: 1992; Label: RCA; Formats: CD, MC; Australia-only release	—	9	—	—	—	—	—	—	—		ARIA: Gold
Celebration	Release date: November 1994; Label: EMICMC; Formats: CD, MC; Continental Europe and Scandinavia release	—	—	—	2	34	85	—	—	—		
Who the F**k Is Alice? Plus 18 Greatest Hits	Release date: June 1995; Label: CMC; Formats: CD, MC; Continental Europe release	—	—	—	—	—	33	—	—	—		
Norske hits	Release date: March 1997; Label: CMC; Formats: CD; Norway-only release	—	—	—	—	—	—	—	10	—		
Our Swedish Collection	Release date: April 1999; Label: CMC; Formats: 2xCD; Released in Denmark as Our Danish Collection	—	—	—	3	—	—	—	—	2		GLF: Platinum; IFPI DEN: Platinum
Uncovered – The Very Best of Smokie	Release date: March 2001; Label: Universal Music TV; Formats: 2xCD, 2xMC	63	—	—	—	—	—	—	—	—		
The Best Of	Release date: 7 April 2003; Label: Camden; Formats: CD	—	—	—	—	—	—	—	—	—		BPI: Silver; BVMI: Gold
The Hit Box	Release date: August 2003; Label: CMC; Formats: 10xCD; Europe-only release	—	—	—	5	—	—	—	9	—		IFPI NOR: Gold
From the Heart	Release date: February 2006; Label: CMC; Formats: 10xCD; Scandinavia-only release	—	—	—	7	—	—	—	20	30		
Living Next Door to Alice	Release date: November 2010; Label: Central Station; Formats: CD; Australia-only release	—	36	—	—	—	—	—	—	—		
Gold 1975–2015	Release date: 20 March 2015; Label: Sony Music; Formats: 2xCD, digital download	—	—	73	—	—	36	—	—	—		
Gold	Release date: 28 August 2020; Label: Crimson/Sony Music; Formats: 3xCD	44	—	—	—	—	—	—	—	—		
"—" denotes releases that did not chart or were not released in that territory.

== Singles ==
Title	Year	Peak chart positions										Certifications	Album
Title	Year	UK	AUS	AUT	IRE	FIN	GER	NL	NOR	SWE	US	Certifications	Album
"Pass It Around"	1975	—	—	—	—	—	—	—	—	—	—		Pass It Around
"If You Think You Know How to Love Me"	1975	3	98	—	2	—	8	17	6	—	96		Changing All the Time
"Don't Play Your Rock 'n' Roll to Me"	1975	8	50	13	7	—	10	22	—	—	—		Changing All the Time
"Something's Been Making Me Blue"	1976	17	—	—	16	—	21	—	—	20	—		Midnight Café
"Wild Wild Angels"	1976	54 (Note: Chart position is from the official UK "Breakers List".)	—	—	—	—	15	—	—	—	—		Midnight Café
"I'll Meet You at Midnight"	1976	11	—	10	1	10	9	5	6	—	—		Non-album singles
"Living Next Door to Alice"	1976	5	2	1	1	9	1	1	1	3	25	BPI: Silver; BVMI: Gold	Non-album singles
"Lay Back in the Arms of Someone"	1977	12	11	1	5	15	1	1	3	16	—		Non-album singles
"It's Your Life"	1977	5	7	4	6	8	3	7	2	15	—		Bright Lights & Back Alleys
"Needles and Pins"	1977	10	7	1	3	27	2	5	4	—	68	BPI: Silver	Bright Lights & Back Alleys
"For a Few Dollars More"	1978	17	57	2	12	—	2	14	2	19	—		The Montreux Album
"Oh Carol"	1978	5	5	5	3	—	3	23	—	—	—	BPI: Silver	The Montreux Album
"Mexican Girl"	1978	19	19	2	4	17	1	10	—	16	—		The Montreux Album
"Do to Me" (Note: "Do to Me" was set for release in the UK but ended up not being issued there.)	1979	—	16	6	—	—	10	—	—	—	—		The Other Side of the Road
"Babe It's Up to You"	1979	—	60	5	—	—	8	41	—	—	—		The Other Side of the Road
"San Francisco Bay" (Note: "San Francisco Bay" was only released as a single in Continental Europe, Scandinavia, South Africa and Australia.)	1980	—	—	10	—	—	9	36	—	—	—		The Other Side of the Road
"Take Good Care of My Baby"	1980	34	48	10	15	—	18	—	—	—	—		Solid Ground
"Run to Me"	1980	—	—	13	—	—	29	—	—	—	—		Non-album singles
"Little Town Flirt" (Note: "Little Town Flirt" was only released as a single in Germany.)	1981	—	—	—	—	—	30	—	—	—	—		Non-album singles
"Jet Lagged" (Note: "Jet Lagged" was only released as a single in Germany.)	1982	—	—	—	—	—	—	—	—	—	—		Solid Ground
"Yesterday's Dreams" (Note: "Yesterday's Dreams" was only released as a single in South Africa.)	1982	—	—	—	—	—	—	—	—	—	—		Strangers in Paradise
"Number on My Wall" (Note: "Number on My Wall" was only released as a single in Germany.)	1982	—	—	—	—	—	—	—	—	—	—		Midnight Delight
"Looking Daggers"	1982	—	—	—	—	—	—	—	—	—	—		Non-album single
"Don't Throw It Away" (Note: "Don't Throw It Away" was only released as a single in Germany.)	1983	—	—	—	—	—	—	—	—	—	—		Midnight Delight
"The Book" (Note: "The Book" was only released as a single in Australia.)	1986	—	—	—	—	—	—	—	—	—	—		Non-album single
"Hold On Tight" (Note: "Hold On Tight" was only released as a single in Denmark and Ireland.)	1987	—	—	—	13	—	—	—	—	—	—		All Fired Up
"Cry in the Night"	1987	184	—	—	22	—	—	—	—	—	—		All Fired Up
"My Heart Is True"	1988	160	—	—	—	—	—	—	—	—	—		All Fired Up
"Young Hearts" (Note: "Young Hearts" was only released as a single in Germany and Scandinavia.)	1989	—	—	—	—	24	43	—	—	—	—		Boulevard of Broken Dreams
"Boulevard of Broken Dreams"	1989	77	—	—	—	—	—	—	—	—	—		Boulevard of Broken Dreams
"Falling Apart" (Note: "Falling Apart" was only released as a single in Norway.)	1990	—	—	—	—	—	—	—	—	—	—		Boulevard of Broken Dreams
"I Feel Love" (Note: "I Feel Love" was only released as a single in Norway.)	1990	—	—	—	—	—	—	—	—	—	—		Whose Are These Boots?
"In the Middle of a Lonely Dream" (Note: "In the Middle of a Lonely Dream" was only released as a single in Continental Europe.)	1990	—	—	—	—	—	—	—	—	—	—		Whose Are These Boots?
"Living Next Door to Alice 1990" (Note: "Living Next Door to Alice 1990" was only released as a single in Norway.)	1990	—	—	—	—	—	—	—	—	—	—		The Best of Smokie
"Smoke Forever – It's Medley-Time" (Note: "Smokie Forever – It's Medley-Time" was only released as a single in Germany.)	1992	—	—	—	—	—	—	—	—	—	—		Non-album single
"You're So Different Tonight" (Note: "You're So Different Tonight" was only released as a single in Germany.)	1992	—	—	—	—	—	—	—	—	—	—		Chasing Shadows
"Don't Play That Game with Me" (Note: "Don't Play That Game with Me" was only released as a single in Continental Europe.)	1992	—	—	—	—	—	84	—	—	—	—		Chasing Shadows
"I'd Die for You" (Note: "I'd Die for You" was only released a single in Continental Europe.)	1993	—	—	—	—	—	—	—	—	—	—		Chasing Shadows
"Naked Love (Baby Love Me...)" (Note: "Naked Love (Baby Love Me...)" was only released as a single in Continental Europe.)	1993	—	—	—	—	—	71	—	—	—	—		Burnin' Ambition
"Listen to Your Radio" (Note: "Listen to Your Radio" was only released as a single in the Netherlands.)	1993	—	—	—	—	—	—	—	—	—	—		Burnin' Ambition
"Bang Bang" (Note: "Bang Bang" was only released as a single in Continental Europe.)	1993	—	—	—	—	—	—	—	—	—	—		Burnin' Ambition
"Who the F**k Is Alice?"	1994	—	—	—	13	—	18	—	—	22	—		Who the F**k Is Alice? Plus 18 Greatest Hits
"Can't Cry Hard Enough" (Note: "Can't Cry Hard Enough" was only released as a single in Sweden.)	1994	—	—	—	—	—	—	—	—	—	—		Celebration
"Rose-a-Lee" (Note: "Rose-a-Lee" was only released as a single in Scandinavia.)	1995	—	—	—	—	—	—	—	—	—	—		The World and Elsewhere
"Living Next Door to Alice (Who the F**k Is Alice)" (with Roy Chubby Brown)	1995	3	—	—	26	—	—	—	—	—	—	BPI: Platinum	Non-album single
"Rock'n'Roll Rodeo" (Note: "Rock'n'Roll Rodeo" was only released a single in Germany and Scandinavia.)	1995	—	—	—	—	—	—	—	—	—	—		The World and Elsewhere
"Have You Ever Seen the Rain"	1996	138	—	—	—	—	—	—	—	—	—		The World and Elsewhere
"When the Lightning Strikes" (Note: "When the Lightning Strikes" was only released as a single in Germany.)	1996	—	—	—	—	—	—	—	—	—	—		The World and Elsewhere
"Light a Candle" (Note: "Light a Candle" was only released a single in Austria and Scandinavia.)	1996	—	—	—	—	—	—	—	—	—	—		Light a Candle – The Christmas Album
"It Won't Be Christmas" (Note: "It Won't Be Christmas" was only released as a single in the Netherlands.)	1996	—	—	—	—	—	—	—	—	—	—		Light a Candle – The Christmas Album
"Wrong Reasons" (with Maggie Reilly) (Note: "Wrong Reasons" was only released as a single in Denmark.)	1998	—	—	—	—	—	—	—	—	—	—		Wild Horses – The Nashville Album
"And the Night Stood Still"	1999	—	—	—	—	—	—	—	—	—	—		Wild Horses – The Nashville Album
"It Never Rains in Southern California" (Note: "It Never Rains in Southern California" was only released as a single in Denmark.)	1999	—	—	—	—	—	—	—	—	—	—		Uncovered
"Be My Baby" (Note: "Be My Baby" was only released as a single in Denmark.)	2001	—	—	—	—	—	—	—	—	—	—		Uncovered Too
"—" denotes releases that did not chart or were not released in that territory.
