= Take a Minute =

Studio album by Smokie
- Released: 9 August 2010
- Recorded: Chairworks Studio in West Yorkshire
- Genre: Pop rock, country rock
- Length: 42:36
- Label: Black Pelican
- Producer: Lars Pedersen, Smokie

Smokie chronology
| Eclipse (2008) | Take a Minute (2010) |

Take a Minute is the 21st studio album by British rock band Smokie, released in 2010.

The album arrived in stores initially in Denmark on 9 August 2010 and went straight up to No. 6 in the charts. It finally reached No. 3 and spent eight weeks there. The album was also successful in Norway, where it peaked at No. 6 during a six weeks chart run. Take a Minute was released in Germany on 15 October 2010 and internationally in February 2011.

The first single from the album is "Sally's Song (The Legacy Goes On)". It can be downloaded on iTunes since 10 September 2010. The song is a continuation of the story of the other character, Sally, in "Living Next Door to Alice". The second single is "Nothing Hurts Like a Broken Heart".

== Track listing ==
=== CD: Take a Minute ===
1. "Take a Minute" (Martin Hansen / Mikael Nord-Andersson / Wayne Hector / Lee McDougall) – 3:55
2. "Sally's Song (The Legacy Goes On)" (Ole Evenrud) – 3:50
3. "If I Can't Love You" (Jan Lysdahl / Peter Malmrup) – 3:40
4. "Let's Do It Again (The Hangover Song)" (Lars Pedersen / Nikolaj Christensen) – 3:31
5. "Nothing Hurts Like a Broken Heart" (Amir Aly / Maciel Numhauser / Robin Abrahamsson) – 3:21
6. "Celtic Days" (Mick McConnell) – 2:56
7. "Friends Will Be Friends" (Nikolaj Christensen / Mads Haugaard) – 3:24
8. "The Biggest Lie" (Terry Uttley / Mick McConnell) – 4:18
9. "I Don't Want to Lose You" (Billy Cross / Mick McConnell) – 3:03
10. "Can't Change the Past" (Miqael Persson / Eric Mårtensson / Peter Karlsson) – 3:37
11. "This is Wot I Did" (Mike Craft) – 3:32
12. "'Til the Grass Grows over Me" (John Davis / Mick McConnell / Conor McGuire) – 3:29

=== Bonus DVD: Live in South Africa ===
1. "Something's Been Making Me Blue"
2. "Lay Back in the Arms of Someone"
3. "Tomorrow"
4. "Medley: It's Your Life, Take Good Care of My Baby, Mexican Girl, Few Dollars More"
5. "Wild Angels"
6. "If You Think You Know How to Love Me"
7. "Home is Anywhere You Are"
8. "Will You Still Love Me Tomorrow"
9. "Baby It's You"
10. "And the Night Stood Still"
11. "Don't Give Me That"
12. "I'll Meet You at Midnight"
13. "Oh Carol"
14. "Needles and Pins"
15. "Have You Ever Seen the Rain"
16. "Don't Play Your Rock 'n' Roll to Me"
17. "Living Next Door to Alice"

== Credits ==
=== Smokie ===
- Mike Craft – lead vocals, backing vocals and acoustic guitar
- Terry Uttley – Fender bass and backing vocals
- Martin Bullard – Rhodes, piano, organ and Mellotron
- Mick McConnell – electric and acoustic guitars, mandolin and backing vocals
- Steve Pinnell – drums and percussion

=== Additional musicians ===
- Pat McManus – fiddle on "Celtic Days"

=== Production ===
- Recorded at The Chairworks|Chairworks Studio in West Yorkshire
- Engineer – James Mottershead
- Edited and cleaned up at Chiefment Studio in Vanløse, Denmark by Lars Pedersen
- Mixed at Hansa Mix Room in Berlin, Germany by Michael Ilbert
- Mastered at Cutting Room in Stockholm, Sweden by Björn Engelmann
- Producer – Lars Pedersen
- Co-produced by Smokie
- Executive producer – Jakob Deichmann
- Photography – Mike & Julie
- Artwork – Martin B. Dennis

== Charts ==
| Chart (2010) | Peak position |
|---|---|
| Danish Albums (Hitlisten) | 3 |
| Norwegian Albums (VG-lista) | 6 |
