= Greatest Hits (Smokie album) =

Compilation album by Smokie
- Released: 3 April 1977
- Recorded: 1975–1977
- Genres: Soft rock, glam rock, pop rock
- Length: 33:22
- Label: RAK
- Producers: Mike Chapman, Nicky Chinn

Smokie chronology
Midnight Café (1976)	Greatest Hits (1977)	Bright Lights & Back Alleys (1977)

Greatest Hits is a compilation album by British rock band Smokie, released in April 1977. It contains all eight of the band's singles up to that date. All but one of the tracks ("Back to Bradford") were written by Nicky Chinn and Mike Chapman.

The album was a commercial success throughout Europe. It reached No. 6 in the UK Albums Chart, spending five months there and ultimately gaining a Silver status in Britain. The record topped the charts in several European countries, including Germany, Austria, Sweden and Norway.

== Track listing ==
All tracks written by Nicky Chinn and Mike Chapman, except "Back to Bradford" written by Chris Norman and Pete Spencer.

Side one
No.	Title	Length
1.	"Lay Back in the Arms of Someone (released as a stand-alone single in February 1977)"	4:07
2.	"Something's Been Making Me Blue (from Midnight Café, 1976)"	3:00
3.	"If You Think You Know How to Love Me (from Changing All the Time, 1975)"	3:26
4.	"Pass It Around (from Pass It Around, 1975)"	3:07
5.	"I'll Meet You at Midnight (from Midnight Café, 1976)"	3:16

Side two
No.	Title	Length
6.	"Living Next Door to Alice (released as a stand-alone single in December 1976)"	3:27
7.	"Changing All the Time (from Changing All the Time, 1975)"	3:24
8.	"Don't Play Your Rock 'n' Roll to Me (from Changing All the Time, 1975)"	3:17
9.	"Back to Bradford (from Changing All the Time, 1975)"	2:42
10.	"Wild Wild Angels (from Midnight Café, 1976)"	3:36
Total length:		33:22

== Personnel ==
- Produced by Mike Chapman in association with Nicky Chinn for Chinnichap
- Engineered by Pete Coleman
- Sleeve design by Ray Kyte
- Photography – Gered Mankowitz

== Charts ==
=== Weekly charts ===
Chart (1977–79)	Peak position
Austrian Albums (Ö3 Austria)	1
German Albums (Offizielle Top 100)	1
Norwegian Albums (VG-lista)	1
Swedish Albums (Sverigetopplistan)	1
UK Albums (Official Charts)	6

=== Monthly charts ===
Monthly chart performance for Greatest Hits
Chart (1981)	Peak position
Soviet Albums (Moskovskij Komsomolets)	1

=== Year-end charts ===
Chart (1977)	Position
Austrian Albums (Ö3 Austria)	1
German Albums (Offizielle Top 100)	8
UK Albums (OCC)	43
Chart (1978)	Position
German Albums (Offizielle Top 100)	50

1981 year-end chart performance for Greatest Hits
Chart (1981)	Position
Soviet Albums (Moskovskij Komsomolets)	4

== Certifications and sales ==
Region	Certification	Certified units/sales
Finland (Musiikkituottajat)	Gold	20,000
Germany (BVMI)	Platinum	500,000^{^}
Norway	—	195,000
Sweden (GLF)	Gold	25,0000
United Kingdom (BPI)	Silver	60,000^{^}
^{^} Shipments figures based on certification alone.
