= Pass It Around =

Pass It Around may refer to:

- Pass It Around (Smokie album), 1975
- Pass It Around (song), a 1975 song by Smokie
- Pass It Around (Donavon Frankenreiter album), 2008
