= What Can I Do? =

What Can I Do? may refer to:

- "What Can I Do?" (Édith Piaf song), 1950
- "What Can I Do" by Smokie from Midnight Café, 1976
- "What Can I Do?" (Ice Cube song), 1994
- "What Can I Do?" (The Corrs song), 1998
- "What Can I Do" (The Black Belles song), 2010
- "What Can I Do" by Gotthard from Human Zoo, 2003
