= Boulevard of Broken Dreams =

Boulevard of Broken Dreams or The Boulevard of Broken Dreams may refer to:

== Film and television ==
- Boulevard of Broken Dreams (film), a 1988 Australian film
- Boulevard of Broken Dreams (TV series), a 2007 American documentary series

== Music ==
- "Boulevard of Broken Dreams" (Al Dubin and Harry Warren song), a 1933 song by Al Dubin and Harry Warren
- Boulevard of Broken Dreams (album), a 1989 album by Smokie
  - "Boulevard of Broken Dreams" (Smokie song), 1989
- "Boulevard of Broken Dreams" (Green Day song), 2004
- "Boulevard of Broken Dreams", a 1984 song by Hanoi Rocks, from Two Steps from the Move
- "Boulevard of Broken Dreams", a 1986 song by Brian Setzer from the album The Knife Feels Like Justice
- "Boulevard of Broken Dreams", a 1990 song by David Cassidy from the album David Cassidy
- "Boulevard of Broken Dreams", a 1991 song by Beatmasters from the album Life & Soul

== Literature ==
- The Boulevard of Broken Dreams (comics), by Kim Deitch
- "The Boulevard of Broken Dreams", a story from Harlan Ellison's 1978 short story collection Strange Wine

== Other ==
- Boulevard of Broken Dreams, a painting by Gottfried Helnwein
- Boulevard of Broken Dreams, a game path in the 1996 PC game The Pandora Directive
