= Light a Candle =

Light a Candle may refer to:

- "Light a Candle", a 2000 single by Daniel O'Donnell
- "Light a Candle", a song by Sarit Hadad for Israel in the Eurovision Song Contest 2002
- Light a Candle (Smokie album), 1996

== See also ==
- To Light a Candle, a 2004 fantasy novel by Mercedes Lackey and James Mallory in the Obsidian Trilogy
