= John Cougar (album) =

1979 studio album by John Cougar

Studio album by John Cougar
- Released: July 27, 1979
- Recorded: Criteria Studios, Miami, 1979 ("I Need a Lover" recorded at AIR Studios, London, England in 1978)
- Genres: Rock, heartland rock
- Length: 43:20
- Label: Riva
- Producers: Ron Albert & Howard Albert; John Punter ("I Need a Lover")

John Cougar chronology
A Biography (1978)	John Cougar (1979)	Nothin' Matters and What If It Did (1980)

Singles from John Cougar
- 1. "Miami" Released: 1979; 2. "I Need a Lover" Released: July 1979

Professional ratings
Review scores
Source	Rating
AllMusic	2/5 stars
MusicHound Rock: The Essential Album Guide	1.5/5 stars
Music Week	3/4 stars
The Rolling Stone Album Guide	2.5/5 stars

John Cougar is the third studio album by John Mellencamp (credited as John Cougar). It was his first album to be released in the US by his new record company Riva Records. Released in 1979, following the success in Australia of the single "I Need a Lover" from his previous album A Biography (which did not receive a U.S. release), John Cougar included the aforementioned track for U.S. audiences, as well as a re-working of A Biography's "Taxi Dancer".

"I Need a Lover", upon the release of this album, became a Top 40 hit in the U.S., peaking at No. 28 in December 1979, after having been a No. 5 hit in Australia in 1978 when it was released as a single from A Biography. "Miami" was also a hit single in Australia, his second Top 40 hit in that country. "I Need a Lover" was subsequently covered by Pat Benatar on her album In the Heat of the Night. In the U.S., however, "Small Paradise" was released as a single in place of "Miami", but it was not very successful, peaking at No. 87 on the Billboard Hot 100 in February 1980. During concerts in 1979 and 1980, guitarist Mike Wanchic would trade lead vocals with Mellencamp on "Miami".

Record World said of the single "Small Paradise" that it's "a deliberate, ballad pace with Cougar's raw vocal exuding tension and drama" and praised the hook and vocal performance.

Record World said of the single "A Little Night Dancin'" that its "light Latin rhythm provides a backdrop for Cougar to project his vivid urban images."

Mellencamp recorded a solo acoustic rendition of "Sugar Marie" for his 2010 box set On the Rural Route 7609, stating in the set's liner notes: "'Sugar Marie' suffered from young musicians not knowing how to present the music. I've always had an affection for the song, and I've always known it had something I didn't get at on the album."

On his inspiration for writing "I Need A Lover", his first Top 40 hit, Mellencamp said: "The song's about a friend of mine who goes to Concordia College. When that song was written, he was pretty sad. He was . . . livin’ in his bedroom. I told him, ‘You got to get the hell out of the house!’ He'd say, ‘Man, if I only had a girl, she’d make me forget my problems.’ I just said, ‘Well . . . ’"

== Track listing ==
All songs written by John Mellencamp, except where noted.

1. "A Little Night Dancin'" – 3:43
2. "Small Paradise" – 3:40
3. "Miami" – 3:53
4. "Great Mid-west" – 4:29
5. "Do You Think That's Fair" – 4:48
6. "I Need a Lover" – 5:35
7. "Welcome to Chinatown" – 3:59
8. "Sugar Marie" – 4:16
9. "Pray for Me" – 3:30 (Mellencamp, Brian Bec Var)
10. "Taxi Dancer" – 5:02
11. "Take Home Pay" (2005 re-issue bonus track) – 3:10

== Personnel ==
- John Mellencamp - vocal, guitar
- Brian Bec Var - piano, keyboards
- Larry Crane - guitars, backing vocals
- Mike "Chief" Wanchic - guitars, backing vocals
- Robert "Ferd" Frank - bass
- Tom Knowles - drums
- Don Gehman - engineer

== Charts ==
Chart (1979/1980)	Position
Australian (Kent Music Report)	77
(United States) Pop Albums	64
