= A Biography =

Studio album by Johnny Cougar
- Released: March 6, 1978
- Recorded: 1977–78
- Studio: Wessex Sound, London; Basing Street, London; AIR, London
- Genre: Rock, heartland rock
- Length: 42:58
- Label: Riva
- Producer: John Punter

Johnny Cougar chronology
Chestnut Street Incident (1976)	A Biography (1978)	John Cougar (1979)

Singles from A Biography
- 1. "I Need a Lover" Released: April 12, 1978; 2. "Factory" Released: May 31, 1978; 3. "Night Slumming/Goodnight" Released: September 22, 1978 (Australia)

Professional ratings
Review scores
Source	Rating
AllMusic	1/5 stars
The Rolling Stone Album Guide	2.5/5 stars

A Biography is the second album by the American singer-songwriter John Mellencamp (credited as Johnny Cougar). Recorded in London, it was released in the UK and Australia by Riva Records on March 6, 1978.

Due to poor sales of Mellencamp's debut album, Chestnut Street Incident, A Biography did not receive a U.S. release upon its 1978 debut. Two of its tracks, "Taxi Dancer" and the single "I Need a Lover", were also included on his 1979 album John Cougar, which was released in the U.S.

In Australia, however, "I Need a Lover" became a Top 10 hit, giving Mellencamp his first taste of success. The song would eventually crack the Top 40 in the U.S. in late 1979 when released as a single from his John Cougar album. AllMusic reviewer Stephen Thomas Erlewine described "I Need a Lover" as Mellencamp's "first good song."

A Biography, along with all Mellencamp's other Riva Records/Mercury Records albums, were remastered and re-released in 2005, marking the first time A Biography was released in the United States.

Mellencamp has often spoken negatively about his early albums, and A Biography is no exception. He stated in Tim Holmes’ 1986 biography: “A Biography is so bitter. I mean I don’t even like to listen to it. I can’t believe it’s me. The songs were written in ’76 or ’77. The lyrics were real awful. They were real ‘I hate you. I hate this.’ And that’s the way I felt at that time."

== Track listing ==
All tracks are written by John Mellencamp.

Side One
No.	Title	Length
1.	"Born Reckless"	4:35
2.	"Factory"	3:02
3.	"Night Slumming"	4:40
4.	"Taxi Dancer"	4:05
5.	"I Need a Lover"	5:37

Side Two
No.	Title	Length
1.	"Alley of the Angels"	3:58
2.	"High C Cherrie"	4:58
3.	"Where the Sidewalk Ends"	3:56
4.	"Let Them Run Your Lives"	5:55
5.	"Goodnight"	2:05

== Personnel ==
- Johnny Cougar – lead and backing vocals, acoustic guitar

Streethart

- Brian BecVar – keyboards, backing vocals
- Larry Crane – guitars, backing vocals
- Robert "Ferd" Frank – bass, backing vocals
- Tom Knowles – drums, backing vocals
- Andy Mackay – saxophones, backing vocals

Additional personnel

- Ann Odell – string arrangement on "Taxi Dancer"
- David Steen – photography
