= Take Heart (Juice Newton album) =

Studio album by Juice Newton
- Released: September 17, 1979
- Genre: Country rock
- Label: Capitol (SN-16244)
- Producer: Otha Young

Juice Newton chronology
Well Kept Secret (1978)	Take Heart (1979)	Juice (1981)

Professional ratings
Review scores
Source	Rating
AllMusic	2/5 stars

Take Heart is the fifth studio album and second solo album by Juice Newton, released on September 17, 1979, by Capitol Records. Five singles were issued from Take Heart: "Any Way That You Want Me", "Lay Back in the Arms of Someone", "Until Tonight", "Sunshine", and "You Fill My Life". All the singles charted, but the album's fourth single, "Sunshine," was the biggest commercial success, peaking at No. 35 on the Hot Country Songs chart.

The album was released on CD for the first time on May 7, 2012, by BGO Records.

== Track listing ==
Side one
No.	Title	Writer(s)	Length
1.	"Sunshine"	Jonathan Edwards	2:57
2.	"Just Holding On"	Michael Clarke	3:39
3.	"Any Way That You Want Me"	Chip Taylor	3:25
4.	"Until Tonight"	Tim James; Steven McClintock	3:15
5.	"Tear It Up"	Dorsey Burnette; Johnny Burnette	3:16

Side two
No.	Title	Writer(s)	Length
6.	"You Fill My Life"	Otha Young	3:27
7.	"One Step at a Time"	James Pennington	3:05
8.	"San Diego Serenade"	Tom Waits	3:40
9.	"The Dream Never Dies"	Richard Cooper	3:46
10.	"Lay Back in the Arms of Someone"	Mike Chapman; Nicky Chinn	3:29

== Chart listings ==
The following songs charted on the Billboard Country Singles chart:

- "Any Way That You Want Me" - #81
- "Lay Back in the Arms of Someone" - #80
- "Until Tonight" - #42
- "Sunshine" - #35
- "You Fill My Life" - #41
