= Wild Horses – The Nashville Album =

Studio album by Smokie
- Released: 25 February 1998
- Recorded: Mastertonics Studios in Nashville, Tennessee
- Genre: Pop rock, country rock
- Length: 48:23
- Label: CMC
- Producer: Barry Beckett

Smokie chronology
Light a Candle (1996)	Wild Horses – The Nashville Album (1998)	Uncovered (2000)

Wild Horses – The Nashville Album is the seventeenth studio album by British rock band Smokie, released on 25 February 1998 by CMC Records.

== Track listing ==
1. "Desperate Measures" (Chuck Jones, Greg Swint) – 3:46
2. "Wrong Reasons" (Duet with Maggie Reilly) (Rick Giles, Winston Sela) – 3:59
3. "And the Night Stood Still" (Diane Warren) – 4:02
4. "She Rides Wild Horses" (Ted Hewitt, Bob Corbin) – 3:30
5. "When It's the Right Time" (Taylor Rhodes, James Dean Hicks) – 3:49
6. "Looking for You" (Jess Brown, Jim Denton) – 4:15
7. "Ain't It Funny How It Works" (John Jarrard, George Teren) – 3:02
8. "All She Ever Really Wanted" (Steve Seskin, Al Anderson) – 2:56
9. "No Rest for the Wounded Heart" (Curt Cuomo, Robert Tepper) – 5:33
10. "When the Walls Come Down" (Kim Carnes, Greg Barnhill) – 3:59
11. "Goodbye Yesterday's Heartache" (Jim Daddario, Greg Barnhill) – 4:01
12. "If You Think You Know How to Love Me" (US version) (Mike Chapman, Nicky Chinn) – 5:27

== Personnel ==
=== Smokie ===
- Mike Craft – lead vocal and guitar
- Terry Uttley – bass and vocals
- Martin Bullard – keyboards
- Steve Pinnell – drums and percussion
- Mick McConnell – guitars and vocals

=== Additional musicians ===
- Paul Franklin – steel guitar

=== Production ===
- Produced by Barry Beckett
- Production coordinator – Regena Warden
- Recorded at Mastertonics Studios in Nashville, Tennessee by Pete Greene, assisted by David Boyer
- Special computer editing – David Boyer
- Mixed at Iliad Studios in Nashville, Tennessee by Pete Greene, assisted by David Boyer and John Koontz
- Mastered at Gateway Mastering in Portland, Maine by Brian K. Lee
- "Wrong Reasons" recorded at Mastertonics Studios / Townhouse Studios in London
  - Mixed at Iliad Studios
  - Additional mix at Puk Recording Studios in Denmark
- Additional mix and recording by Peter Iversen
- Cover and artwork – Michael Rix and Jens Merch

== Charts ==
Chart (1998)	Peak position
Norway (VG-lista)	19
