= Come to Me (Juice Newton album) =

Studio album by Juice Newton & Silver Spur
- Released: 1977
- Genre: Country
- Length: 35:13
- Label: Capitol
- Producer: Elliot F. Mazer

Juice Newton & Silver Spur chronology
After the Dust Settles (1976)	Come to Me (1977)	Well Kept Secret (1978)

Professional ratings
Review scores
Source	Rating
AllMusic	4/5 stars

Come to Me is the third studio album by Juice Newton & Silver Spur, released by Capitol Records in 1977. It was Newton's third and final album with Silver Spur, and she released her solo debut the following year. Some foreign issues of the album included "It's a Heartache", which was released as a one-off single in the United States in 1978.

The album was released on CD for the first time on May 7, 2012, by BGO Records.

== Track listing ==
Side one
No.	Title	Writer(s)	Length
1.	"Low Down and Lonesome"	Juice Newton; Otha Young; Robbie Gillman	2:52
2.	"Come to Me"	Robbie Gillman; Rusty Oppenheimer	3:34
3.	"Back Down to Lonely"	Newton; Otha Young; Robbie Gillman	4:14
4.	"Crying Too Long"	Otha Young; Robbie Gillman	3:40
5.	"Wouldn't Mind the Rain"	Otha Young	3:35

Side two
No.	Title	Writer(s)	Length
6.	"Good Luck Baby Jane"	Bob Seger	3:53
7.	"Save a Heart"	Newton; Otha Young; Robbie Gillman	3:18
8.	"The Fire Down Below"	Bob Seger	3:59
9.	"Good Woman at Home"	Tom Kealey; Linda Kealey	3:05
10.	"You've Been Around"	Otha Young; Robbie Gillman	3:12
Total length:			35:13

== Personnel ==
- Juice Newton - lead vocals, rhythm guitar
- Otha Young - lead guitar, backing vocals
- Tom Kealey - bass, backing vocals
- Robbie Gillman - keyboards, backing vocals
- Denny Seiwell (tracks: A2, B1, B2), Teddy Irwin - drums
- Brian Rogers - "strings and things" arrangements
- Elliot F. Mazer, Juice Newton, Silver Spur - arrangements
