= And the Night Stood Still =

Single by Dion

from the album Yo Frankie
- B-side: "Tower of Love"
- Released: August 1989
- Genre: Rock and roll
- Length: 4:20
- Label: Arista Records 9797
- Songwriter: Diane Warren
- Producer: Dave Edmunds

Dion singles chronology
"Simple Ironies" (1986)	"And the Night Stood Still" (1989)	"King of the New York Streets" (1989)

"And the Night Stood Still" is a song written by Diane Warren and performed by Dion with backing vocals by Patty Smyth and Dave Edmunds. It was produced and arranged by Edmunds.

The song reached No. 16 on the Adult Contemporary chart and No. 75 on the Billboard Hot 100 in 1989. It was featured on his 1989 album Yo Frankie.

A music video was produced for the song and aired on MTV.

== Smokie versions ==
- Smokie released a version of the song on their album Wild Horses – The Nashville Album (1998) and a live version on their album Take a Minute (2010).
