= Do to Me =

Single by Smokie

from the album The Other Side of the Road
- B-side: "Cryin'"
- Released: 1979
- Length: 3:18
- Label: RAK
- Songwriters: Chris Norman, Pete Spencer
- Producer: Smokie

Smokie singles chronology
"Mexican Girl" (1978)	"Do to Me" (1979)	"Babe It's Up to You" (1979)

"Do to Me" is a song by the British rock band Smokie from their 1979 studio album The Other Side of the Road. It was the album's first single.

== Background and writing ==
The song was written by Chris Norman and Smokie drummer Pete Spencer and produced by Smokie.

== Commercial performance ==
The song reached no. 10 in Germany.

== Charts ==
Chart (1979)	Peak position
Australia (Kent Music Report)	16
Austria (Ö3 Austria Top 40)	6
Germany	10
Switzerland (Schweizer Hitparade)	7
