= In the Heat of the Night (Pat Benatar album) =

Studio album by Pat Benatar
- Released: August 27, 1979
- Recorded: June–July 1979
- Studio: MCA Whitney (Glendale, California)
- Genres: Hard rock; pop rock
- Length: 38:01
- Label: Chrysalis
- Producers: Mike Chapman; Peter Coleman

Pat Benatar chronology
In the Heat of the Night (1979)	Crimes of Passion (1980)

Singles from In the Heat of the Night
- 1. "I Need a Lover" Released: August 27, 1979; 2. "If You Think You Know How to Love Me" Released: September 14, 1979; 3. "Heartbreaker" Released: October 26, 1979; 4. "Rated X" Released: 1979 (France only); 5. "We Live for Love" Released: February 25, 1980

Professional ratings
Review scores
Source	Rating
AllMusic	4/5 stars
Rolling Stone	Mixed
The Village Voice	C+

In the Heat of the Night is the debut studio album by American singer Pat Benatar, released on August 27, 1979, by Chrysalis Records. The album debuted on the Billboard 200 for the week ending October 20, 1979, peaking at No. 12 in March 1980, almost six months after its release.

The album includes "Heartbreaker", her breakthrough single in the United States (where it reached the top 25), Canada and New Zealand (it reached the top 20 in both those countries). "Heartbreaker" was the third single released from the album, as neither the first single, Benatar's version of "I Need a Lover", or the second single, her rendition of "If You Think You Know How to Love Me", charted in the US, Canada, Australia or New Zealand.

In the Heat of the Night also contained "We Live for Love", which became Benatar's first top-10 entry in any country when it rose to No. 8 in Canada, while also reaching the top 30 in the US, New Zealand and Australia, her first sizable hit in the latter. In France, "We Live for Love" reached the top 40, although "Rated X" had previously reached the French top 30. In the Netherlands and Belgium, Benatar's rendition of "I Need a Lover" charted within the top 30.

On Billboard magazine's 1980 year-end top pop albums chart, In the Heat of the Night was listed at No. 7. The album also reached No. 3 in Canada, No. 8 in New Zealand, and No. 25 in Australia.

In the Heat of the Night was remastered and reissued on Capitol Records in 2006.

== Track listing ==
Side one
No.	Title	Writer(s)	Length
1.	"Heartbreaker" (Jenny Darren cover)	Geoff Gill; Cliff Wade	3:26
2.	"I Need a Lover" (John Mellencamp cover)	John Cougar Mellencamp	3:28
3.	"If You Think You Know How to Love Me" (Smokie cover)	Nicky Chinn; Mike Chapman	4:20
4.	"In the Heat of the Night" (Smokie cover)	Chinn; Chapman	5:22
5.	"My Clone Sleeps Alone"	Roger Capps; Pat Benatar	3:27

Side two
No.	Title	Writer(s)	Length
6.	"We Live for Love"	Neil Giraldo	3:54
7.	"Rated X" (Nick Gilder cover)	Gilder; James McCulloch	3:15
8.	"Don't Let It Show" (The Alan Parsons Project cover)	Alan Parsons; Eric Woolfson	4:01
9.	"No You Don't" (Sweet cover)	Chinn; Chapman	3:18
10.	"So Sincere"	Capps; Benatar	3:30
Total length:			38:01

== Personnel ==
Credits adapted from the liner notes of In the Heat of the Night.

=== Musicians ===
- Pat Benatar – vocals
- Neil Giraldo – lead guitar, keyboards, slide guitar, back-up vocals
- Scott St. Clair Sheets – guitars
- Roger Capps – bass, backing vocals
- Glen Alexander Hamilton – drums

=== Technical ===
- Mike Chapman – production (tracks 2–4)
- Peter Coleman – production (tracks 1, 5–10)
- Steve Hall – mastering

=== Artwork ===
- Ria Lewerke – art direction, design
- Alex Chatelain – photography

== Charts ==
=== Weekly charts ===
1980 weekly chart performance for In the Heat of the Night
Chart (1980)	Peak position
Australian Albums (Kent Music Report)	25
Canada Top Albums/CDs (RPM)	3
New Zealand Albums (RMNZ)	8
US Billboard 200	12

1985 weekly chart performance for In the Heat of the Night
Chart (1985)	Peak position
UK Albums (Official Charts)	98

=== Year-end charts ===
1980 year-end chart performance for In the Heat of the Night
Chart (1980)	Position
Canada Top Albums/CDs (RPM)	17
New Zealand Albums (RMNZ)	12
US Billboard 200	7

1981 year-end chart performance for In the Heat of the Night
Chart (1981)	Position
US Billboard 200	68

== Certifications ==
Certifications for In the Heat of the Night
Region	Certification	Certified units/sales
Canada (Music Canada)	4× Platinum	400,000^{^}
France (SNEP)	Gold	100,000^{*}
New Zealand (RMNZ)	Platinum	15,000^{^}
United States (RIAA)	Platinum	1,000,000^{^}
^{*} Sales figures based on certification alone.^{^} Shipments figures based on certification alone.
