= I Need a Lover =

1978 single by Johnny Cougar

Single by Johnny Cougar

from the album A Biography and John Cougar
- B-side: "Welcome to Chinatown"
- Released: 1978
- Studio: AIR (London, UK)
- Genre: Rock
- Length: 5:38, 3:30 (single)
- Label: Riva
- Songwriter: John Mellencamp
- Producer: John Punter

Johnny Cougar singles chronology
"I Need a Lover" (1978)	"Factory" (1978)

"I Need a Lover" is the debut single by John Mellencamp, first released in 1978 under the stage name "Johnny Cougar".

== Background ==
The song appeared on his 1978 album A Biography, which was not released in the United States. After becoming a top 10 hit in Australia (reaching No. 5), the song was later included on his 1979 follow-up album John Cougar to introduce it to U.S. audiences, and was released there as a single, becoming his first U.S. top 40 hit when it reached No. 28 on the Billboard Hot 100 in December 1979.

AllMusic reviewer Stephen Thomas Erlewine described "I Need a Lover" as Mellencamp's "first good song". Cash Box said that "Cougar's gutsy, forthright vocals and lyrics are nicely backed by passionate guitar and a footstomping, hell-raising beat." Record World said that "Cougar's midwestern roots grow into urban urgency on this explosive rocker."

On his inspiration for writing "I Need a Lover", Mellencamp said: "The song's about a friend of mine who goes to Concordia College. When that song was written, he was pretty sad. He was . . . livin' in his bedroom. I told him, 'You got to get the hell out of the house!' He'd say, 'Man, if I only had a girl, she'd make me forget my problems.' I just said, 'Well . . . '"

Mellencamp has also stated that "I Need a Lover" was inspired by the Rolling Stones' 1972 song "Happy".

== Pat Benatar version ==
"I Need a Lover"

Single by Pat Benatar

from the album In the Heat of the Night
- B-side: "No You Don't"
- Released: August 1979
- Studio: MCA Whitney Studios (Glendale, CA)
- Genre: Arena rock
- Length: 3:30
- Label: Chrysalis
- Songwriter: John Mellencamp
- Producers: Mike Chapman; Peter Coleman

Pat Benatar singles chronology
"We Live for Love" (1979)	"I Need a Lover" (1979)	"Rated X" (1980)

The song was covered and released as the debut single in 1979 by American rock singer Pat Benatar for her debut album, In the Heat of the Night (1979). The song became an album-oriented rock radio hit for the singer and has been part of the live set list on tour. Chrysalis Records released a live music video for the song in 1981.

=== Reception ===
Writing for Billboard magazine, Jim McCullaugh described Benatar's cover as a "hypnotic, midtempo rocker" and "better than Cougar's raspy original".

=== Weekly charts ===
Weekly chart performance for "I Need a Lover"
Chart (1980)	Peak position
Belgium (Ultratop 50 Flanders)	24
Netherlands (Single Top 100)	31
Netherlands (Dutch Top 40)	31

== In popular culture ==
- Hamilton Leithauser (of indie rock band the Walkmen) performed a version of the song in August 2014 for The A.V. Club's A.V. Undercover series.
