= San Francisco Bay (Smokie song) =

Single by Smokie

from the album The Other Side of the Road
- B-side: "You're You"
- Released: 1979
- Length: 3:15
- Label: RAK
- Songwriter(s): Chris Norman, Pete Spencer
- Producer(s): Smokie

Smokie singles chronology
"Babe It's Up to You" (1979)	"San Francisco Bay" (1979)	"Take Good Care of My Baby" (1979)

"San Francisco Bay" is a song by the British rock band Smokie from their 1979 studio album The Other Side of the Road. It was the album's third and final single.

== Background and writing ==
The song was written by Chris Norman and Smokie drummer Pete Spencer and produced by Smokie.

== Commercial performance ==
The song reached no. 9 in Germany.

== Charts ==
Chart (1979)	Peak position
Austria (Ö3 Austria Top 40)	10
Germany	9
Netherlands (Single Top 100)	36
