= Bright Lights & Back Alleys =

Studio album by Smokie
- Released: 7 October 1977
- Recorded: March – April 1977
- Studios: Whitney Recording Studios (Glendale, California)
- Genres: Pop rock; country rock
- Length: 39:08 (Note: Ariola 261028-217)
- Label: RAK
- Producers: Mike Chapman; Nicky Chinn

Smokie chronology
Greatest Hits (1977)	Bright Lights & Back Alleys (1977)	The Montreux Album (1978)

Singles from Bright Lights & Back Alleys
- 1. "It's Your Life" Released: June 1977; 2. "Needles and Pins" Released: 30 September 1977

Professional ratings
Review scores
Source	Rating
AllMusic	2.5/5 stars

Bright Lights & Back Alleys is the fourth studio album by the English rock band Smokie, released on 7 October 1977 in the United Kingdom by RAK Records. Recorded primarily at Whitney Recording Studios in Glendale, California, from March to April 1977, it was produced by Mike Chapman and Nicky Chinn, as were all the band's previous albums.

== Track listing ==
Side one
No.	Title	Writer(s)	Length
1.	"It's Your Life"	Nicky Chinn, Mike Chapman	3:33
2.	"I Can't Stay Here Tonight"	Chris Norman, Pete Spencer	4:05
3.	"Sunshine Avenue"	Norman, Spencer	3:09
4.	"Think of Me (The Lonely One)"	Norman, Spencer	4:41^^
5.	"In the Heat of the Night"	Chinn, Chapman	4:45

Side two
No.	Title	Writer(s)	Length
6.	"Needles and Pins"	Jack Nitzsche, Sonny Bono	2:43
7.	"No One Could Ever Love You More"	Norman, Spencer	2:30
8.	"The Dancer"	Leo Sayer, David Courtney	3:50
9.	"Baby It's You"	Norman, Spencer	3:49
10.	"Walk Right Back"	Norman, Spencer	5:29
Total length:			39:08

^^The U.S. edition of the album replaces "Think Of Me (The Lonely One)" with "Lay Back In The Arms Of Someone" written by Mike Chapman and Nicky Chinn.

2007 remastered edition bonus tracks (Note: 7T's GLAM CD 39)
No.	Title	Writer(s)	Length
11.	"Now You Think You Know"	Terry Uttley	3:28
12.	"Lay Back in the Arms of Someone"	Chinn, Chapman	4:05
13.	"Here Lies a Man"	Norman, Spencer	3:28
Total length:			49:58

2016 remastered edition bonus tracks (Note: Sony Music 88985321942)
No.	Title	Writer(s)	Length
14.	"Alone in a Cell"	Norman, Spencer, Alan Silson, Uttley	4:48
Total length:			54:50

== Personnel ==
Credits are adapted from the album's 1977 (Note: RAK SRAK 530) and 2016 liner notes.

Smokie

- Chris Norman – lead vocals and backing vocals, guitars, synthesizers and electric piano
- Alan Silson – guitars and backing vocals
- Terry Uttley – bass and backing vocals
- Pete Spencer – drums, percussions and backing vocals

Additional musicians

- Tom Scott – lyricon and tenor saxophone (on "In the Heat of the Night")

Technical personnel

- Mike Chapman – production
- Nicky Chinn – production
- Pete Coleman – engineering
- Jimmie Haskell – string arrangements (on tracks 1–3 and 5)
- Phil Dennys – string arrangements (on tracks 4 and 8)
- Cream – sleeve design
- Gered Mankowitz – photography

Remastering

- Tim Turan at Turan Audio – 2007 remastering
- MM Sound Digital Mastering Studios – 2016 remastering

== Charts ==
=== Weekly charts ===
Chart (1977)	Peak position
Australia (Kent Music Report)	36
Austrian Albums (Ö3 Austria)	6
German Albums (Offizielle Top 100)	6
Norwegian Albums (VG-lista)	1
Swedish Albums (Sverigetopplistan)	3

=== Year-end charts ===
Chart (1978)	Position
German Albums (Offizielle Top 100)	31

== Certifications ==
Region	Certification	Certified units/sales
Germany (BVMI)	Gold	250,000^{^}
United Kingdom (BPI)	Silver	60,000^{^}
^{^} Shipments figures based on certification alone.
