= Babe It's Up to You =

Single by Smokie

from the album The Other Side of the Road
- B-side: "Did She Have To Go Away"
- Released: 19 October 1979
- Length: 3:43
- Label: RAK
- Songwriter(s): Gloria Macari, Roger Ferris
- Producer(s): Smokie

Smokie singles chronology
"Do to Me" (1979)	"Babe It's Up to You" (1979)	"San Francisco Bay" (1979)

"Babe It's Up to You" is a song by the British rock band Smokie from their 1979 studio album The Other Side of the Road. It was the album's second single.

== Background and writing ==
The song was written by Gloria "Glo" Macari and Roger Ferris and produced by Smokie. It samples the piece Belle nuit, ô nuit d'amour from The Tales of Hoffmann by Jacques Offenbach in the chorus of the song.

== Commercial performance ==
The song reached no. 8 in Germany.

== Charts ==
Chart (1979)	Peak position
Australia (Kent Music Report)	60
Austria (Ö3 Austria Top 40)	5
Germany	8
Netherlands (Single Top 100)	41
Switzerland (Schweizer Hitparade)	8

== Cover versions ==
Chris Norman included his solo cover of the song on his 2000 studio album Full Circle.
