= The Other Side of the Road =

Studio album by Smokie
- Released: 19 October 1979
- Genre: Rock, Pop rock
- Length: 44:48 (Note: Ariola 74321 72971 2)
- Label: Rak Records
- Producer: Smokie for Score Music Production

Smokie chronology
The Montreux Album (1978)	The Other Side of the Road (1979)	Solid Ground (1981)

Singles from The Other Side of the Road
- 1. "Do to Me" Released: 1979; 2. "Babe It's Up to You" Released: 1979; 3. "San Francisco Bay" Released: 1980

Professional ratings
Review scores
Source	Rating
Record Mirror	2/5 stars

The Other Side of the Road is the sixth studio album by British rock band Smokie, released in 1979. When the album was released on CD in the 2000s, it was taken from a vinyl source.

== Track listing ==
Side One
No.	Title	Writer(s)	Length
1.	"The Other Side of the Road"	Chris Norman, Pete Spencer	3:51
2.	"Do to Me"	Chris Norman, Pete Spencer	3:18
3.	"Belinda"	Terry Uttley, Alan Silson	2:57
4.	"Big Fat Momma"	Chris Norman, Pete Spencer	2:47
5.	"Don't Take Your Love Away This Time"	Chris Norman, Pete Spencer	3:12
6.	"London Is Burning"	Chris Norman, Pete Spencer	5:10

Side Two
No.	Title	Writer(s)	Length
7.	"Babe It's Up to You"	Gloria Macari, Roger Ferris	3:43
8.	"You Don't Care"	Terry Uttley, Alan Silson	3:17
9.	"All Alone"	Chris Norman, Pete Spencer	3:55
10.	"I Can't Stop Loving You"	Terry Uttley, Alan Silson	3:34
11.	"Too Many Pennies In Hell"	Chris Norman, Pete Spencer	1:17
12.	"Samantha Elizabeth"	Terry Uttley, Alan Silson	4:00
13.	"San Francisco Bay"	Chris Norman, Pete Spencer	3:15
Total length:			38:07

2007 remastered edition bonus tracks (Note: 7T's GLAM CD 41)
No.	Title	Writer(s)	Length
14.	"Cryin'" (B-side of "Do to Me")	Terry Uttley, Alan Silson	2:35
15.	"Did She Have to Go Away" (B-side of "Babe It's Up to You")	Terry Uttley, Alan Silson	3:26
16.	"You're You" (B-side of "San Francisco Bay")	Terry Uttley, Alan Silson	3:45
17.	"Maybe I Just Don't Know"	Don Williams	3:03
Total length:			57:37

2016 remastered edition bonus track (Note: Sony Music 88875129562)
No.	Title	Writer(s)	Length
18.	"The Classic Hits Medley"	Nicky Chinn, Mike Chapman, Chris Norman, Pete Spencer	8:52
Total length:			1:06:18

== Charts ==
Chart (1979/80)	Peak position
Australia (Kent Music Report)	36
Austrian Albums (Ö3 Austria)	7
German Albums (Offizielle Top 100)	17
Norwegian Albums (VG-lista)	7
Swedish Albums (Sverigetopplistan)	26

== Personnel ==
Smokie

- Chris Norman - lead and backing vocals, guitars, keyboards, synthesizer, banjo, percussion
- Terry Uttley - bass guitar, lead (8) and backing vocals
- Pete Spencer - drums, percussion, acoustic guitar (11), vocals (11)
- Alan Silson - lead guitar, acoustic guitar, guitar synth, lead (12) and backing vocals
