= For a Few Dollars More (song) =

Single by Smokie

from the album The Montreux Album
- B-side: "Goin' Tomorrow"
- Released: January 1978
- Length: 3:34
- Label: RAK
- Songwriter(s): Nicky Chinn, Mike Chapman
- Producer(s): Mike Chapman

Smokie singles chronology
"Needles and Pins" (1977)	"For a Few Dollars More" (1978)	"Oh Carol" (1978)

Music video
- "For a Few Dollars More" on YouTube

"For a Few Dollars More" is a song by the British rock band Smokie from their 1978 studio album The Montreux Album. It was the album's first single. The song first came out in January 1978 as a single and later appeared on the album, which was released in October.

== Background and writing ==
The song was written by Nicky Chinn and Mike Chapman and produced by Mike Chapman.

== Charts ==
Chart (1978)	Peak position
Australia (Kent Music Report)	57
Austria (Ö3 Austria Top 40)	2
Belgium (Ultratop 50 Flanders)	18
Germany	2
Netherlands (Single Top 100)	14
Norway (VG-lista)	2
Sweden (Sverigetopplistan)	19
Switzerland (Schweizer Hitparade)	5
UK Singles (OCC)	17

== Cover versions ==
Chris Norman included his solo cover of the song on his 2000 studio album "Full Circle".
