= Boulevard of Broken Dreams (Smokie song) =

Single by Smokie

from the album Boulevard of Broken Dreams
- B-side: "Need Some Good Loving" (CD mini) "If You Think You Know How To Love Me" (7" vinyl) "Young Hearts" (7" vinyl promo)
- Released: 1989
- Length: 4:12
- Label: Wag (UK); Polydor GmbH (Germany)
- Songwriter(s): Alan Silson
- Producer(s): Simon Humphrey

Smokie singles chronology
| "Take Good Care of My Baby" (1980) | "Boulevard of Broken Dreams" (1989) | "Little Town Flirt" (1981) |

"Boulevard of Broken Dreams" is a song by the British rock band Smokie from their 1989 album Boulevard of Broken Dreams. It was also released as a single (at the very end of 1989).

== Commercial performance ==
The single debuted at number 77 in the UK (on the week of 31 December 1989 — 6 January 1990).

== Charts ==
| Chart (1989–1990) | Peak position |
|---|---|
| UK Singles (OCC) | 77 |
