= The Montreux Album =

Studio album by Smokie
- Released: 12 September 1978
- Recorded: 6–24 February 1978
- Studio: Mountain Studios (Montreux, Switzerland)
- Genre: Pop rock; country rock
- Length: 34:32 (Note: Ariola 261027-217)
- Label: RAK
- Producer: Mike Chapman

Smokie chronology
Bright Lights & Back Alleys (1977)	The Montreux Album (1978)	The Other Side of the Road (1979)

Singles from The Montreux Album
- 1. "For a Few Dollars More" Released: January 1978; 2. "Oh Carol" Released: May 1978; 3. "Mexican Girl" Released: September 1978

Professional ratings
Review scores
Source	Rating
AllMusic	3/5 stars

The Montreux Album is the fifth studio album by the English rock band Smokie, released in 1978. Recorded primarily at Mountain Studios in Montreux (hence the album's title) between 6 and 24 February 1978, it was the band's last album to be made in partnership with Nicky Chinn and Mike Chapman.

== Track listing ==
Side one
No.	Title	Writer(s)	Length
1.	"The Girl Can't Help It"	Chris Norman, Pete Spencer	3:44
2.	"Power of Love"	Nicky Chinn, Mike Chapman	1:54
3.	"No More Letters"	Norman, Spencer	3:27
4.	"Mexican Girl"	Norman, Spencer	3:57
5.	"You Took Me by Surprise"	Alan Silson, Terry Uttley	3:38

Side two
No.	Title	Writer(s)	Length
6.	"Oh Carol"	Chinn, Chapman	3:39
7.	"Liverpool Docks"	Norman, Spencer	2:56
8.	"Light Up My Life"	Uttley, Silson	4:23
9.	"Petesey's Song"	Norman, Spencer	2:49
10.	"For a Few Dollars More"	Chinn, Chapman	3:33
Total length:			34:32

2007 remastered edition bonus tracks (Note: 7T's GLAM CD 40)
No.	Title	Writer(s)	Length
11.	"Stumblin' In" (with Suzi Quatro)	Chinn, Chapman	3:58
12.	"Stranger with You" (with Suzi Quatro)	Chinn, Chapman	3:53
Total length:			42:19

2016 remastered edition bonus tracks (Note: Sony Music 88985321952)
No.	Title	Writer(s)	Length
11.	"Roll On Baby"	Spencer	2:41
12.	"Love's a Riot"	Chinn, Chapman	3:43
13.	"Stumblin' In"	Chinn, Chapman	3:59
14.	"A Stranger with You"	Chinn, Chapman	3:52
Total length:			48:45

== Personnel ==
Credits are adapted from the album's 1978 and 2016 liner notes (Note: RSO RS-1-3045, 2394 222).

Smokie

- Chris Norman – lead vocals, backing vocals, lead and rhythm guitars, keyboards, synthesizers
- Alan Silson – lead vocals (on "You Took Me by Surprise"), backing vocals, acoustic and electric lead guitars
- Terry Uttley – lead vocals (on "Light Up My Life"), backing vocals, bass guitar
- Pete Spencer – lead vocals (on "Petesey's Song"), backing vocals, drums and percussion, tenor saxophone (on "No More Letters")

Technical personnel

- Mike Chapman – production
- Pete Coleman – engineering
- Ian Cooper – mixing (at Whitney Recording Studios, Glendale, California, in March 1978) and mastering (at Utopia Studios, London, England)
- Richard Gray – sleeve design
- Gered Mankowitz – art direction and photography

Remastering

- Tim Turan at Turan Audio – 2007 remastering
- MM Sound Digital Mastering Studios – 2016 remastering

== Charts ==
=== Weekly charts ===
Weekly chart performance for The Montreux Album
Chart (1978)	Peak position
Australian Albums (Kent Music Report)	26
Austrian Albums (Ö3 Austria)	6
Finnish Albums (Suomen virallinen lista)	15
German Albums (Offizielle Top 100)	3
Dutch Albums (Album Top 100)	29
Norwegian Albums (VG-lista)	5
Swedish Albums (Sverigetopplistan)	3
UK Albums (OCC)	52

=== Year-end charts ===
Year-end chart performance for The Montreux Album
Chart (1979)	Position
German Albums (Offizielle Top 100)	43

== Certifications ==
Certifications for The Montreux Album
Region	Certification	Certified units/sales
Germany (BVMI)	Gold	250,000^{^}
United Kingdom (BPI)	Silver	60,000^{^}
^{^} Shipments figures based on certification alone.
