= Midnight Café =

Studio album by Smokie
- Released: 9 April 1976
- Recorded: Whitney Recording Studios (Glendale, California)
- Genres: Pop rock; country rock
- Length: 43:29 (Note: Ariola 261031-217)
- Label: RAK
- Producers: Mike Chapman; Nicky Chinn

Smokie chronology
Changing All the Time (1975)	Midnight Café (1976)	Greatest Hits (1977)

Singles from Midnight Café
- 1. "Something's Been Making Me Blue" Released: 2 January 1976; 2. "Wild Wild Angels" Released: 9 April 1976; 3. "I'll Meet You at Midnight" Released: 3 September 1976

Professional ratings
Review scores
Source	Rating
AllMusic	2.5/5 stars

Midnight Café is the third studio album by the English rock band Smokie (their first with the current spelling), released in April 1976.

== Track listing ==
Side one
No.	Title	Writer(s)	Length
1.	"Something's Been Making Me Blue"	Nicky Chinn, Mike Chapman	2:59
2.	"Wild Wild Angels"	Chinn, Chapman	3:55
3.	"Poor Lady (Midnight Baby)"	Chris Norman, Pete Spencer	4:41
4.	"When My Back Was Against the Wall"	Norman, Spencer	3:34
5.	"Make Ya Boogie"	Alan Silson, Norman, Spencer, Terry Uttley	5:12

Side two
No.	Title	Writer(s)	Length
6.	"Stranger"	Chinn, Chapman	4:40
7.	"What Can I Do"	Silson	3:35
8.	"Little Lucy"	Norman, Spencer	3:44
9.	"Going Home"	Norman, Spencer	7:32
10.	"I'll Meet You at Midnight"	Chinn, Chapman	3:14
Total length:			43:29

2007 remastered edition bonus tracks (Note: 7T's GLAM CD 38)
No.	Title	Writer(s)	Length
10.	"Train Song"	Silson	3:44
11.	"The Loser"	Norman, Spencer	3:02
12.	"I'll Meet You at Midnight"	Chinn, Chapman	3:17
13.	"Miss You"	Norman, Spencer	3:36
14.	"Living Next Door to Alice"	Chinn, Chapman	3:28
15.	"Run to You"	Silson, Uttley	3:46
Total length:			62:00

2016 remastered edition bonus tracks (Note: Sony Music 88985321932)
No.	Title	Writer(s)	Length
16.	"What Can I Do" (Alan Silson home demo)	Silson	3:52
Total length:			66:05

- "I'll Meet You At Midnight" is the 12th track on the 2007 and 2016 remastered editions, lifting "Train Song" and "The Loser" up to 10–11, and bumping the remaining bonus tracks to 13–16.

== Personnel ==
Credits are adapted from the album's 1976 (Note: RAK SRAK 520) and 2016 liner notes.

Smokie

- Chris Norman – lead vocals, back vocals, acoustic guitars, electric guitars, piano
- Alan Silson – lead guitar, back vocals, acoustic guitars, lead vocals (on "What Can I Do")
- Terry Uttley – bass guitar, back vocals
- Pete Spencer – drums, percussion, back vocals

Technical personnel

- Mike Chapman – production
- Nicky Chinn – production
- Pete Coleman – engineering
- Chris Blair – mastering (at Abbey Road Studios, London, England)
- Jimmie Haskell – string arrangements (on tracks 1–4, 6 and 9)
- Michael Ross – sleeve design
- Gered Mankowitz – photography

Remastering

- Tim Turan at Turan Audio – 2007 remastering
- MM Sound Digital Mastering Studios – 2016 remastering

== Charts ==
=== Weekly charts ===
Chart (1976)	Peak position
German Albums (Offizielle Top 100)	6
Norwegian Albums (VG-lista)	12
Chart (1977)	Peak position
US Billboard 200	173

=== Year-end charts ===
Chart (1977)	Position
German Albums (Offizielle Top 100)	37
