= It's Your Life (Smokie song) =

Single by Smokie

from the album Bright Lights & Back Alleys
- B-side: "Now You Think You Know"
- Released: June 1977
- Length: 3:34
- Label: RAK
- Songwriter(s): Nicky Chinn, Mike Chapman
- Producer(s): Mike Chapman

Smokie singles chronology
"Lay Back in the Arms of Someone" (1977)	"It's Your Life" (1977)	"Needles and Pins" (1977)

Music video
- "It's Your Life" on YouTube

"It's Your Life" is a song by the British rock band Smokie from their 1977 studio album Bright Lights & Back Alleys. It first came out in June 1977 as a single and later appeared on the album, which was released in late September.

== Background and writing ==
The song was written by Nicky Chinn and Mike Chapman and produced by Chapman.

== Charts ==
=== Weekly charts ===
Chart (1977)	Peak position
Australia (Kent Music Report)	7
Austria (Ö3 Austria Top 40)	4
Belgium (Ultratop 50 Flanders)	10
Belgium (Ultratop 50 Wallonia)	42
Netherlands (Dutch Top 40)	7
Netherlands (Single Top 100)	7
Norway (VG-lista)	2
Sweden (Sverigetopplistan)	15
Switzerland (Schweizer Hitparade)	5
UK Singles (OCC)	5
West Germany (GfK)	3

=== Year-end charts ===
Chart (1977)	Position
Australia (Kent Music Report)	80
Austria (Ö3 Austria Top 40)	13
Netherlands (Dutch Top 40)	86
Netherlands (Single Top 100)	92
West Germany (Official German Charts)	22
