= Mexican Girl =

Single by Smokie

from the album The Montreux Album
- B-side: "You Took Me by Surprise"
- Released: 8 September 1978
- Length: 3:57
- Label: RAK
- Songwriters: Chris Norman, Pete Spencer
- Producer: Mike Chapman

Smokie singles chronology
"Oh Carol" (1978)	"Mexican Girl" (1978)	"Do to Me" (1979)

Music video
- "Mexican Girl" on YouTube

"Mexican Girl" is a song by the British rock band Smokie from their 1978 studio album The Montreux Album. It was the album's third and final single. The song first came out in September 1978 as a single and later appeared on the album, which was released in October.

== Background and writing ==
The song was written by Chris Norman and Smokie drummer Pete Spencer and produced by Mike Chapman.

== Commercial performance ==
The song reached no. 1 in Germany.

== Charts ==
=== Weekly charts ===
Chart (1978)	Peak position
Australia (Kent Music Report)	19
Austria (Ö3 Austria Top 40)	2
Belgium (Ultratop 50 Flanders)	14
Netherlands (Dutch Top 40)	11
Netherlands (Single Top 100)	10
Sweden (Sverigetopplistan)	16
UK Singles (Official Charts)	19
West Germany (GfK)	1

=== Year-end charts ===
Chart (1978)	Position
Netherlands (Dutch Top 40)	92

== Cover versions ==
In 2000, Chris Norman issued his solo version of the song as a CD maxi-single in Europe. This version was released as the second single from his eleventh studio album, Full Circle (2000).
