= Boulevard of Broken Dreams (album) =

Studio album by Smokie
- Released: 1989
- Label: WAG Records/PolyGram Records AS Norway (Europe); MCA Records (Ireland)
- Producer: Simon Humphrey; Dieter Bohlen ("Young Hearts")

Smokie chronology
| All Fired Up (1988) | Boulevard of Broken Dreams (1989) | Whose Are These Boots? (1990) |

Singles from Boulevard of Broken Dreams
- 1. "Boulevard of Broken Dreams" Released: 1990

Boulevard of Broken Dreams is a studio album by the British rock band Smokie, released in 1989 on Wag Records (on PolyGram Records AS Norway in continental Europe).

== Commercial performance ==
The album spent seven weeks at no. 1 in Norway. The band's next album, Whose Are These Boots? (1990), would also reach no. 1 in Norway.

== Track listing ==
All tracks were produced by Simon Humphrey, except for "Young Hearts" produced by Dieter Bohlen at studio 33, Hamburg, West Germany.

| No. | Title | Writer(s) | Length |
|---|---|---|---|
| 1. | "Boulevard of Broken Dreams" | Alan Silson | 4:30 |
| 2. | "Falling Apart" | Peter Goalby | 4:15 |
| 3. | "Think About the Night" | Alan Barton | 3:55 |
| 4. | "Sometimes You Cry" | Terry Uttley | 3:44 |
| 5. | "Love Take Me Away (Sleeping Beauty)" | Alan Barton, Martin Bullard | 4:10 |
| 6. | "Moving Mountains" | Tom Scott, Frank Musker, Elizabeth Lamers | 4:23 |
| 7. | "Young Hearts" | Dieter Bohlen, Eric Styx | 4:19 |
| 8. | "Stop Rewind" | Alan Barton, Martin Bullard | 3:28 |
| 9. | "Angelina" | Terry Uttley | 3:46 |
| 10. | "Northern Soul" | Clive Gregson | 4:21 |
| 11. | "Hearts Need Company" | Alan Silson, Chris Wade | 4:27 |

== Charts ==
| Chart (1989) | Peak position |
|---|---|
| Norwegian Albums (VG-lista) | 1 |
