= Don't Play Your Rock 'n' Roll to Me =

1975 single by Smokie

Single by Smokie

from the album Changing All the Time
- B-side: "Talking Her Around"
- Released: September 1975
- Studio: Audio International Studios in London
- Genre: Pop rock, glam rock, country rock
- Length: 3:18
- Label: RAK
- Songwriter: Chinn/Chapman
- Producers: Mike Chapman, Nicky Chinn

Smokie singles chronology
"If You Think You Know How to Love Me" (1975)	"Don't Play Your Rock 'n' Roll to Me" (1975)	"Something's Been Making Me Blue" (1976)

Music video
- "Don't Play Your Rock 'n' Roll to Me" on YouTube

"Don't Play Your Rock 'n' Roll to Me" is a song by British rock band Smokie. It was released in early September 1975 as a single and appeared later on the album Changing All the Time. Like the band's previous two singles "Pass It Around" and "If You Think You Know How to Love Me", the song was composed by Nicky Chinn/Mike Chapman.

The acoustic guitar riff in "Don't Play Your Rock 'n' Roll to Me" is adopted from the Elvis Presley hit "His Latest Flame".

The single was as successful as the previous one. It debuted in the UK Singles Chart on 4 October 1975, reaching #8 and lingering in the charts for seven weeks.

== Track listing ==
Side A
No.	Title	Writer(s)	Length
1.	"Don't Play Your Rock 'n' Roll to Me"	Chinn/Chapman	3:18

Side B
No.	Title	Writer(s)	Length
2.	"Talking Her Around"	Uttley	2:44

== Charts ==
Chart (1975)	Position
Australia (Kent Music Report)	50
Austria	13
Belgium (Flanders)	27
Belgium (Wallonia)	48
Netherlands	22
New Zealand	24
UK Singles Chart	8
West Germany	10
