= Changing All the Time =

Studio album by Smokie
- Released: 22 September 1975
- Recorded: 1975
- Studios: Audio International Studios (London, England); Decca Studios (Paris, France)
- Genres: Pop rock; country rock
- Length: 34:20 (Note: Ariola 261029-217)
- Label: RAK
- Producers: Mike Chapman; Nicky Chinn

Smokie chronology
Pass It Around (1975)	Changing All the Time (1975)	Midnight Café (1976)

Singles from Changing All the Time
- 1. "If You Think You Know How to Love Me" Released: June 1975; 2. "Don't Play Your Rock 'n' Roll to Me" Released: September 1975

Professional ratings
Review scores
Source	Rating
AllMusic	3/5 stars

Changing All the Time is the second studio album by the English rock band Smokie, released in September 1975.

Early pressings of the album had been made with the band's original name "Smokey", but in November 1975 it was announced that the name would be altered to "Smokie" in order to avoid confusion with soul legend Smokey Robinson. All later copies of the album would bear the changed spelling.

== Track listing ==
Side one
No.	Title	Writer(s)	Length
1.	"Don't Play Your Rock 'n' Roll to Me"	Nicky Chinn, Mike Chapman	3:19
2.	"If You Think You Know How to Love Me"	Chinn, Chapman	3:27
3.	"It's Natural"	Pete Spencer, Chris Norman	2:40
4.	"Give It to Me"	Alan Silson	3:44
5.	"We're Flyin' High"	Chinn, Chapman	3:55

Side two
No.	Title	Writer(s)	Length
6.	"Changing All the time"	Chinn, Chapman	3:39
7.	"Julia"	Spencer, Norman	2:56
8.	"Take Me In"	Silson	4:23
9.	"Umbrella Day"	Spencer, Norman	2:49
10.	"Back to Bradford"	Spencer, Norman	2:41
Total length:			30:93

2007 remastered edition bonus tracks (Note: 7T's GLAM CD 37)
No.	Title	Writer(s)	Length
11.	"Tis Me"	Spencer, Norman	2:56
12.	"Talking Her Round"	Terry Uttley	2:44
Total length:			35:93

2016 remastered edition bonus tracks (Note: Sony Music 88985321922)
No.	Title	Writer(s)	Length
13.	"If You Think You Know How to Love Me" (Alan Silson home demo recording)	Chinn, Chapman	4:10
14.	"If You Think You Know How to Love Me" (Jay Frog & Amfree mix)	Chinn, Chapman	5:13
Total length:			45:16

== Personnel ==
Credits are adapted from the album's 1975 (Note: RAK SRAK 517) and 2016 liner notes.

Smokie

- Chris Norman – lead vocals, back vocals, acoustic guitar, electric guitar, piano
- Alan Silson – lead guitar, acoustic guitar, steel guitar, back vocals, lead vocals (on "Give It to Me")
- Terry Uttley – bass guitar, back vocals
- Pete Spencer – drums, flute, percussion

Technical personnel

- Mike Chapman – production
- Nicky Chinn – production
- Pete Coleman – engineering
- Chris Blair – mastering (at Abbey Road Studios, London, England)
- Phil Dennys – string arrangements (on tracks 1, 2 and 6)
- Michael Ross – sleeve design
- Gered Mankowitz – photography
- Dick Ward – tinting

Remastering

- Tim Turan at Turan Audio – 2007 remastering
- MM Sound Digital Mastering Studios – 2016 remastering

== Charts ==
Chart (1975)	Peak position
German Albums (Offizielle Top 100)	16
UK Albums (Official Charts)	18

== Certifications ==
Region	Certification	Certified units/sales
United Kingdom (BPI)	Silver	60,000^{^}
^{^} Shipments figures based on certification alone.
