= I'll Meet You at Midnight =

Single by Smokie

from the album Midnight Café
- B-side: "Miss You"
- Released: 1976
- Length: 3:14
- Label: RAK
- Songwriters: Nicky Chinn, Mike Chapman
- Producers: Mike Chapman and Nicky Chinn

Smokie singles chronology
| "Wild Wild Angels" (1975) | "I'll Meet You at Midnight" (1976) | "Living Next Door to Alice" (1976) |

Music video
- "I'll Meet You at Midnight" on YouTube

"I'll Meet You at Midnight" is a song by the British rock band Smokie from their 1976 studio album Midnight Café. In September of the same year it was released as a single. It was the third and final single from the album, after "Something's Been Making Me Blue" and "Wild Wild Angels".

== Background and writing ==
The song was written by Nicky Chinn and Mike Chapman and produced by Mike Chapman in association with Nicky Chinn.

== Charts ==
=== Weekly charts ===
| Chart (1976–1977) | Peak position |
|---|---|
| Austria (Ö3 Austria Top 40) | 10 |
| Belgium (Ultratop 50 Flanders) | 11 |
| Belgium (Ultratop 50 Wallonia) | 44 |
| Ireland (IRMA) | 1 |
| Netherlands (Dutch Top 40) | 5 |
| Netherlands (Single Top 100) | 5 |
| Norway (VG-lista) | 6 |
| South Africa (Springbok Radio) | 3 |
| UK Singles (OCC) | 11 |
| West Germany (GfK) | 9 |

=== Year-end charts ===
| Chart (1976) | Position |
|---|---|
| Belgium (Ultratop Flanders) | 90 |
| Netherlands (Dutch Top 40) | 49 |
| Netherlands (Single Top 100) | 57 |

== Cover versions ==
Chris Norman included his solo cover of the song on his 2000 studio album "Full Circle".

The song was covered by Finnish artist Markku Aro in 1977, titled Keskiyön aikaan – I'll Meet You At Midnight.
