= Oh Carol (Smokie song) =

Single by Smokie

from the album The Montreux Album
- B-side: "Will You Love Me"
- Released: 5 May 1978
- Genre: Ragtime
- Length: 3:39
- Label: RAK
- Songwriter(s): Nicky Chinn, Mike Chapman
- Producer(s): Mike Chapman

Smokie singles chronology
"For a Few Dollars More" (1978)	"Oh Carol" (1978)	"Mexican Girl" (1978)

Music video
- "Oh Carol" on YouTube

"Oh Carol" is a song by the British rock band Smokie from their 1978 studio album The Montreux Album. It was the album's second single. The song first came out in May 1978 as a single and later appeared on the album, which was released in October.

== Background and writing ==
The song was written by Nicky Chinn and Mike Chapman and produced by Mike Chapman.

== Charts ==
Chart (1978)	Peak position
Australia (Kent Music Report)	5
Austria (Ö3 Austria Top 40)	5
Belgium (Ultratop 50 Flanders)	30
Germany	3
Netherlands (Single Top 100)	23
Switzerland (Schweizer Hitparade)	2
UK Singles (OCC)	5

=== Year-end charts ===
Chart (1978)	Peak position
Australia (Kent Music Report)	16

== Cover versions ==
In early 2000, Chris Norman issued his solo version of the song as a CD maxi-single in Europe. This version is from his eleventh studio album, Full Circle (2000).
