= Pass It Around (song) =

Single by Smokie

from the album Pass It Around
- B-side: "Couldn't Live"
- Released: 21 March 1975
- Recorded: Audio International Studios in London
- Length: 3:07
- Label: RAK
- Songwriter: Chinn/Chapman
- Producers: Mike Chapman, Nicky Chinn

Smokie singles chronology
"Pass It Around" (1975)	"If You Think You Know How to Love Me" (1975)

"Pass It Around" is the debut single by British rock band Smokie. It was released on 21 March 1975 as the only single from the album of the same name.

Although the single was promoted on various TV shows, it didn't make it into BBC Radio 1 rotation. The problem was the censors, who thought that the ambiguous lyrics and the band's name could be seen as a reference to smoking marijuana, it failed to chart in the UK.

== Track listing ==
Side A
No.	Title	Writer(s)	Length
1.	"Pass It Around"	Chinn/Chapman	03:07

Side B
No.	Title	Writer(s)	Length
2.	"Couldn't Live"	Uttley	02:25
