= Lay Back in the Arms of Someone =

Single by Smokie

from the album Greatest Hits
- B-side: "Here Lies a Man"
- Released: 18 February 1977
- Recorded: 1976
- Genre: Soft rock, pop rock
- Label: RAK
- Songwriters: Nicky Chinn & Mike Chapman
- Producers: Mike Chapman, Nicky Chinn

Smokie singles chronology
"Living Next Door to Alice" (1976)	"Lay Back in the Arms of Someone" (1977)	"It's Your Life" (1977)

Music video
- "Lay Back in the Arms of Someone" on YouTube

"Lay Back in the Arms of Someone" is a song co-written by Nicky Chinn and Mike Chapman, performed by the English band Smokie.

== Charts ==
=== Weekly charts ===
Chart (1977)	Peak position
Australia (Kent Music Report)	11
Austria	1
Europe	1
Germany	1
Netherlands	1
Switzerland	2
Norway	3
Ireland	5
UK	12
Sweden	16
New Zealand	36

=== Year-end charts ===
Chart (1977)	Position
Australia (Kent Music Report)	69

== Cover versions ==
- The song was covered by American country music artist Randy Barlow in 1979, whose version peaked at number 13 on the Billboard Hot Country Singles chart.
- In 1979 the song was released as a single from Tanya Tucker's album Tear Me Apart, produced by Mike Chapman, but it failed to chart.
- The track also appeared on Juice Newton's 1979 Take Heart album, as well as 1987's Greatest Hits (And More). Newton's version peaked at #80 on the Billboard Country chart.
- Rick Nelson covered the song in 1981, releasing it on his "Four You" EP album on the Epic label.
