= Pass It Around (Smokie album) =

Studio album by Smokey
- Released: 14 February 1975
- Recorded: Audio International Studios in London
- Genres: Glam rock, hard rock, pop rock
- Length: 44:17
- Label: RAK
- Producers: Mike Chapman, Nicky Chinn

Smokey chronology
Pass It Around (1975)	Changing All the Time (1975)

Professional ratings
Review scores
Source	Rating
Allmusic	2/5 stars

Pass It Around is the debut studio album by British rock band Smokey (later renamed Smokie), released in 1975.

The album features eleven original group songs and two Nicky Chinn / Mike Chapman compositions. The Chinn / Chapman written title track was chosen to be Smokie's debut single. "Pass It Around" / "Couldn't Live" was released on 21 March 1975 but failed to make the BBC Radio 1 playlist. The problem was playlist controllers who thought that the ambiguous lyrics might be seen as a reference to smoking marijuana. As a result, the single failed to reach the UK Top 50.

To promote Pass It Around, Smokie extensively tour Britain starting on 24 April 1975 as support act to Pilot, who scored a UK No. 1 hit with "January". Despite all the promotion activity, neither album nor single managed to chart in the UK.

== Track listing ==
Side one
No.	Title	Writer(s)	Length
1.	"Pass It Around"	Nicky Chinn, Mike Chapman	3:07
2.	"Daydreamin'"	Chris Norman, Pete Spencer, Terry Uttley	2:17
3.	"Oh Well, Oh Well"	Norman, Spencer	3:17
4.	"My Woman"	Norman, Spencer	3:22
5.	"It Makes Me Money"	Norman, Spencer	2:57
6.	"Headspin"	Norman, Spencer	3:32
7.	"Goin' Tomorrow"	Norman, Alan Silson, Uttley, Spencer	3:43

Side two
No.	Title	Writer(s)	Length
8.	"I Do Declare"	Chinn, Chapman	3:46
9.	"Don't Turn Out Your Light"	Norman, Spencer	4:01
10.	"Will You Love Me"	Norman, Silson, Uttley, Spencer	3:44
11.	"A Day at the Mother-in-Law's"	Silson	2:51
12.	"The Coldest Night"	Silson	4:15
13.	"Shy Guy"	Silson	3:25
Total length:			44:17

2007 7T's Records remastered edition bonus track
No.	Title	Writer(s)	Length
14.	"Couldn't Live"	Uttley	2:25
Total length:			46:42

== 2016 bonus tracks ==
- 14. Couldn't Live – 2:23
- 15. I Gotta Be Free [Chris Norman – Demo Recording] – 1:30
- 16. You Ring My Bell [Kindness] – 2:58

== Charts ==
The album peaked at number 94 for one week in June 1979 in Australia.

Chart (1979)	Peak position
Australia (Kent Music Report)	94

== Credits ==
=== Smokie ===
- Chris Norman – lead vocals and guitar
- Terry Uttley – bass and backing vocals
- Pete Spencer – drums and vocals
- Alan Silson – lead guitar, backing vocals, lead vocal on "A Day at the Mother-in-Law's"

=== Technical personnel ===
- Produced by Mike Chapman in association with Nicky Chinn for Chinnichap
- Engineer – Pete Coleman
- Recorded at Audio International Studios in London
- Tape operators – Pete Silver and Phil Colman
- Mastered by Chris Blair at EMI, Abbey Road
- Cover photography – Gered Mankowitz

Remastering

- Tim Turan at Turan Audio – 2007 remastering
- MM Sound Digital Mastering Studios – 2016 remastering
