= Wild Wild Angels =

Single by Smokie

from the album Midnight Café
- B-side: "The Loser"
- Released: 1976
- Length: 3:37
- Label: RAK
- Songwriter(s): Nicky Chinn, Mike Chapman
- Producer(s): Mike Chapman and Nicky Chinn

Smokie singles chronology
"Something's Been Making Me Blue" (1976)	"Wild Wild Angels" (1976)	"I'll Meet You at Midnight" (1976)

Music video
- "Wild Wild Angels" on YouTube

"Wild Wild Angels" is a song by the British rock band Smokie from their 1976 studio album Midnight Café. It was the second of three singles from the album (the other ones were "Something's Been Making Me Blue" and "I'll Meet You at Midnight".)

== Background and writing ==
The song was written by Nicky Chinn and Mike Chapman and produced by Mike Chapman and Nicky Chinn.

== Charts ==
Chart (1976)	Peak position
Germany	15
