= If You Think You Know How to Love Me =

- Artwork for German vinyl single

Single by Smokie

from the album Changing All the Time
- B-side: "Tis Me"
- Released: June 1975
- Recorded: Audio International Studios in London
- Genre: Soft rock, pop rock
- Length: 3:27
- Label: RAK
- Songwriters: Nicky Chinn, Mike Chapman
- Producers: Mike Chapman, Nicky Chinn

Smokie singles chronology
| "Pass It Around" (1975) | "If You Think You Know How to Love Me" (1975) | "Don't Play Your Rock 'n' Roll to Me" (1975) |

Music videos
- "If You Think You Know How to Love Me" "If You Think You Know How to Love Me" (Remix) on YouTube

"If You Think You Know How to Love Me" is a song by British rock band Smokie. It was first released in June 1975 as a single and appeared later on the album Changing All the Time. Like the band's first single "Pass It Around", the song was composed by Nicky Chinn and Mike Chapman.

Upon its release, "If You Think You Know How to Love Me" became a chart success all over Europe, peaking at No. 2 in Ireland, No. 3 in Sweden, No. 6 in Norway, No. 8 in Germany and No. 15 in the Netherlands. It took six weeks for the song to debut in the UK Singles Chart on 19 July 1975. After a few days, Smokie appeared on BBC show Top of the Pops, and this helped the song to climb the charts. The single eventually peaked at No. 3 on the UK charts, during a nine-week stay on that chart.

After their US breakthrough, with "Living Next Door to Alice" making the Top 30, the song was re-released to serve as the follow up single, but it did not make the chart.

A second version of the song was included in the 1988 album All Fired Up, sung by Alan Barton. The original 1975 version was sung by Chris Norman.

Pat Benatar recorded the song in 1979 for her debut album In the Heat of the Night, released as the second single from that album in October 1979.

== Track listing ==
Side A
| No. | Title | Writer(s) | Length |
|---|---|---|---|
| 1. | "If You Think You Know How to Love Me" | Nicky Chinn, Mike Chapman | 3:27 |

Side B
| No. | Title | Writer(s) | Length |
|---|---|---|---|
| 2. | "Tis Me" | Peter Spencer, Chris Norman | 2:56 |

== Chart history ==
=== Weekly charts ===
| Year | Chart | Position |
|---|---|---|
| 1975 | Australia (Kent Music Report) | 98 |
| 1975 | Ireland (IRMA) | 2 |
| 1975 | South Africa (Springbok) | 2 |
| 1975 | UK Singles Chart | 3 |
| 1975 | US Billboard Hot 100 | 96 |

=== Year-end charts ===
| Chart (1975) | Rank |
|---|---|
| South Africa | 18 |
| UK | 44 |
