= Something's Been Making Me Blue =

Single by Smokie

from the album Midnight Café
- B-side: "Train Song"
- Released: 2 January 1976
- Length: 3:00
- Label: RAK
- Songwriter(s): Nicky Chinn, Mike Chapman
- Producer(s): Mike Chapman and Nicky Chinn

Smokie singles chronology
"Don't Play Your Rock 'n' Roll to Me" (1975)	"Something's Been Making Me Blue" (1976)	"Wild Wild Angels" (1976)

Music video
- "Something's Been Making Me Blue" on YouTube

"Something's Been Making Me Blue" is a song by the British rock band Smokie from their 1976 studio album Midnight Café. It first came out in January 1976 as a single and later appeared on the album, which was released in April.

== Background and writing ==
The song was written by Nicky Chinn and Mike Chapman and produced by Mike Chapman and Nicky Chinn.

== Charts ==
Chart (1976)	Peak position
Germany	21
Sweden (Sverigetopplistan)	20
UK Singles (OCC)	17
