= Smokie (band) =

English rock band

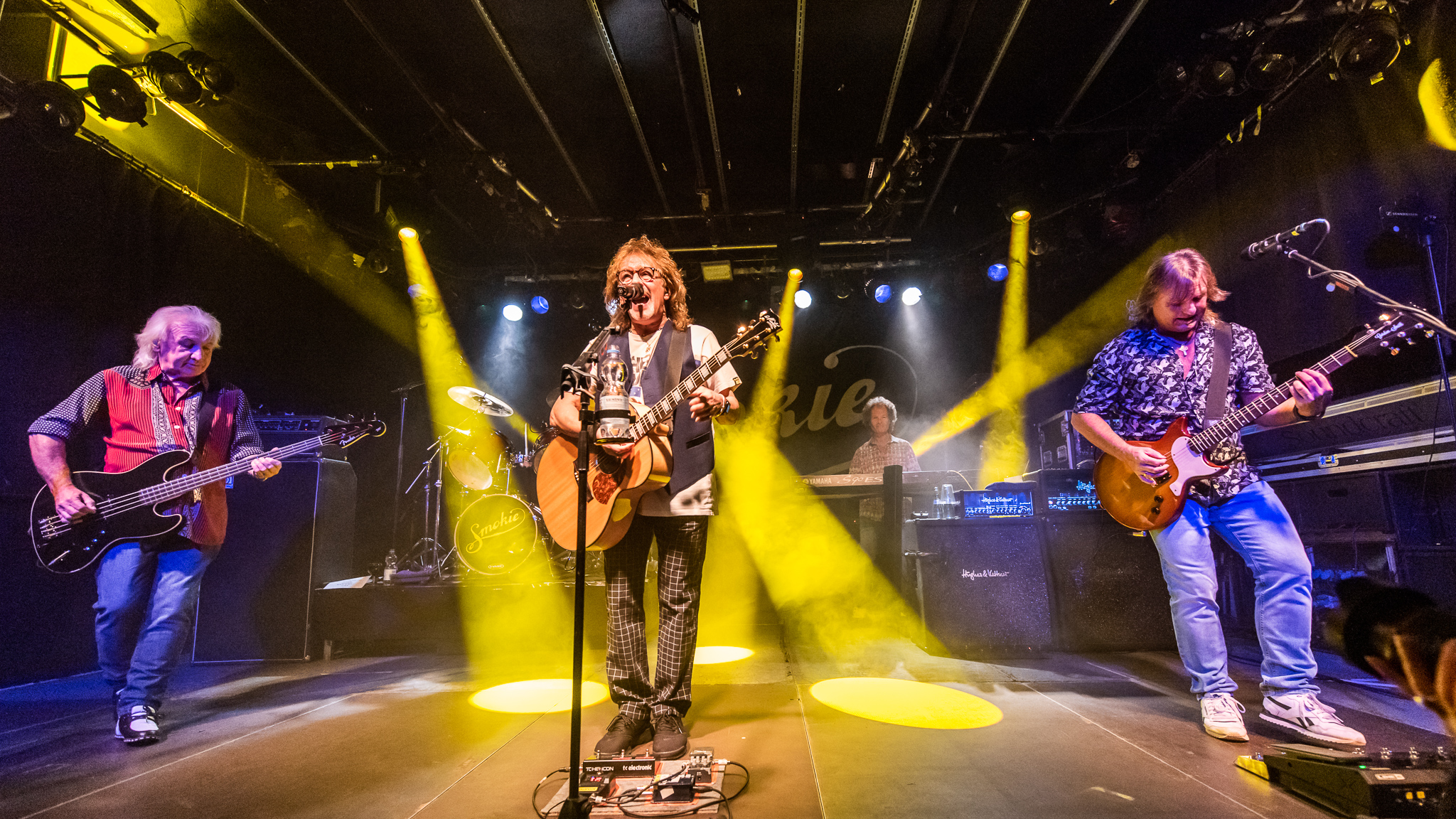
- Smokie performing in Hamburg in 2018

Background information
- Also known as: Smokey
- Origin: Bradford, Yorkshire, England
- Genres: Pop rock; soft rock; glam rock
- Years active: 1964–present
- Labels: Rak; EMI/BMG; RSO
- Members: Martin Bullard; Steve Pinnell; Mick McConnell; Pete Lincoln; Luke Bullard
- Past members: Alan Silson; Terry Uttley; Chris Norman; Ron Kelly; Arthur Higgins; Pete Spencer; Alan Barton; Mike Craft
- Website: www.smokie.co.uk

Smokie (originally spelt Smokey) are an English rock band from Bradford, Yorkshire. The band found success at home and abroad after teaming up with Mike Chapman and Nicky Chinn. They have had a number of lineup changes and were still actively touring in 2024. Their most popular hit single, "Living Next Door to Alice", peaked at No. 3 on the UK Singles Chart and, in March 1977, reached No. 25 on the Billboard Hot 100, as well as going to No. 1 on the Australian singles chart. Other hit singles include "If You Think You Know How to Love Me", "Oh Carol", "Lay Back in the Arms of Someone", and "I'll Meet You at Midnight".

== History ==
=== Early years ===
The band was formed as the Yen after a chance meeting between Ron Kelly and Alan Silson at Moore's Music Shop, North Parade, Bradford, in October 1963. Two days after that meeting they were joined by Chris Norman for rehearsals but, without finding a suitable bass player just practised together for a year. The addition of Terry Uttley on bass guitar at the beginning of 1965 completed the lineup and The Yen's first gig was at Birkenshaw School in February 1965. It was composed of Chris Norman (lead vocals/rhythm guitar), Terry Uttley (bass/vocals), Alan Silson (lead guitar/vocals), and Ron Kelly (drums). They were renamed The Sphynx, and later Essence. As Essence, they toured small clubs in Bradford and the surrounding communities before they split in 1966. The Black Cats were already a working band when Ron Kelly joined them at Dewsbury College in September 1966. The Black Cats at this time were Peter Eastwood on guitar/vocals and Arthur Higgins on bass. Kelly replaced the drummer they had at the time. Alan Silson and Pete Eastwood joined the band, but the latter soon left and was replaced by Chris Norman. In November 1967 the band changed their name to The Four Corners.

In April 1968, Mark Jordan became the group's manager and suggested that they rename the band "The Elizabethans". They began to perform full-time. In June 1968, Terry Uttley joined the group as a replacement for Arthur Higgins, who had left the band in order to carry on his education. On 9 December 1968 the group had their first TV appearance, on Yorkshire Television's news and magazine show Calendar. In August 1969, the band performed for the BBC show High Jinx, and after this success, recorded their first demo tape. In January 1970, RCA Records expressed its interest and recommended that the band change its name to Kindness. The double A-side "Light of Love"/"Lindy Lou" was released on 3 April 1970.

An arrangement was made with Ronnie Storm (no connection to Rory Storm) to back him on the single release "My Desire", and it was released under the pseudonym Fuzzy and The Barnets, due to contractual difficulties encountered by Storm. At the same time Steve Rowland, of Family Dogg, heard the band playing live on Radio One Club and offered to sign them to his production company. He arranged for Albert Hammond, who was also in Family Dogg, to write a number for the band, entitled "It Never Rains in Southern California". However, before it could be released, Hammond decided to record it himself, for which Kelly was recruited by Steve Rowland to play drums. Hammond wrote other songs for the band, and a single "You Ring a Bell"/"Have You Met Angela" was recorded, but due to various problems in Rowland's organisation, it was not released. In late 1971, the band's management was taken over by Dave Eager, the BBC Radio One DJ, at the same time that Norman suffered an infection that left him with a rougher voice. They recorded records in February 1972 with Decca, including their first single "Oh Julie"/"I Love You Carolina". Their next single, "Let the Good Times Roll", was well-received by the media and was selected as the opening theme for Emperor Rosko's BBC Radio One Saturday show, but this popularity did not translate into record sales. The last Decca single was "Make it Better"/"Lonely Long Lady", which flopped, and their Decca contract was cancelled.

=== Rise to fame ===
During the band's Decca contract, Eager used his contacts with the Manchester-based agency Kennedy Street Enterprises, to gain the band an audition to be Peter Noone's backing band. The band were asked to become his permanent band after their audition at Noone's House in Denham, Buckinghamshire, and soon they embarked on a nationwide tour with him. During the tour Bill Hurley offered to manage them. Ron Kelly left Kindness on 8 August 1973 and the band recruited an old school friend, Pete Spencer (drums/vocals), who had played in various groups (including with Allan Holdsworth), to drum for them. Hurley introduced the band to composers Nicky Chinn and Mike Chapman, who also wrote songs for glam rock contemporaries Sweet, Mud, and Suzi Quatro. They eventually agreed to work with the group and suggested another change of name to "Smokey".

They purchased new instruments and in late 1974 began recording their debut album Pass It Around which was released 14 February 1975 but failed to gain significant attention. In April Smokey opened for Pilot on tour.

=== Height of popularity ===
The band was threatened with a lawsuit by Smokey Robinson due to the similarity of its name. In response, the group began to spell its name "Smokie". They began their first tour as the headline act after the release of their second album on 22 September 1975, Changing All the Time. Its first single, "If You Think You Know How to Love Me", peaked at No. 3 in the UK Singles Chart. They followed it with "Don't Play Your Rock 'n' Roll to Me".

The next album was produced in part in the United States, where Nicky Chinn had relocated. Called Midnight Café, it built on the popularity of Changing All the Time. The subsequent years yielded a string of successful singles: "Something's Been Making Me Blue", "Wild Wild Angels", and "I'll Meet You At Midnight". Their cover of Australian band New World's single, "Living Next Door to Alice", released in November 1976, reached No. 5 on the UK Singles Chart, followed by another hit "Lay Back in the Arms of Someone". The next two albums, 1977's Bright Lights & Back Alleys and The Montreux Album (1978), cemented their status and were both chart successes. From Bright Lights & Back Alleys came two hit singles, the reggae influenced "It's Your Life" and a cover of "Needles and Pins".

In 1978, Chris Norman and Suzi Quatro released a duet single, "Stumblin' In", composed by Chinnichap. The single sold over one million copies and reached no. 4 in the US Top 10, though it only reached No. 41 in the UK. The group's next 45 was "Mexican Girl". Composed by Norman and Spencer, the record saw the group actively distance itself from Chinnichap.

In 1979, the group released the album The Other Side of the Road, which had been recorded in Australia. Smokie took a hiatus before Solid Ground was released in 1981. The advance single was a cover of Del Shannon's 1963 hit, "Little Town Flirt" — but it failed to reach the UK Singles Chart.

Chris Norman and Pete Spencer wrote and produced the song "This Time (We'll Get It Right)". It was recorded by the 1982 England's World Cup Squad and was a No. 2 hit in the UK Singles Chart, selling over one million copies.

=== Decline and Norman's departure ===
In early 1982, the album Strangers in Paradise was released. The group then began to work on two parallel albums, one released by Smokie as Midnight Delight, and the other Chris Norman's first solo album, Rock Away Your Teardrops. Neither release sold well.

In 1983, band members Alan Silson, Chris Norman and Terry Uttley collaborated with Agnetha Fältskog, singing together on the track "Once Burned Twice Shy" from her first English language solo album entitled Wrap Your Arms Around Me. The band say it was on the flight to record this song in Sweden that they decided to part ways. Chris Norman began his solo career and Terry Uttley went on to play bass for several other groups including Peter Goalby and John Coghlan (ex Status Quo drummer) and former Sweet vocalist Brian Connolly. The band said "It just seemed like the right thing to do at the time."

Though Smokie had begun work on a comeback, in 1986, Norman announced that he was to leave the band. He was replaced by Alan Barton, formerly of Black Lace, who had been suggested by Chris as a good replacement for the band because of his similar vocal style to Norman's. Smokie also recruited keyboard player Martin Bullard. Spencer quit and was replaced on drums by Steve Pinnell. The new lineup released All Fired Up in 1988.

=== Comeback ===
The group continued to release albums, including Boulevard of Broken Dreams (1989, seven weeks at No. 1 in Norway; all tracks were produced by Simon Humphrey, except "Young Hearts", which was produced by Dieter Bohlen); Whose Are These Boots? (1990, No. 1 in Norway); Chasing Shadows (1992); and Celebration (1994). None had any real success in the UK. However, Smokie made a surprise return to the UK Singles Chart in 1995, with a duet with the controversial northern comedian Roy Chubby Brown. The re-worked re-release of "Living Next Door To Alice (Who the F**k is Alice)" reached No. 3 in the UK. The band had noticed that, whilst touring in Ireland, whenever they sang the main line "For 24 years/I've been living next door to Alice" the audience would shout "Alice? Who the fuck is Alice?" In addition, a resident DJ in a Dutch café, Gompie, organised a recording, and had a No. 17 UK hit with the title of "Alice (Who the X is Alice) (Living Next Door to Alice)" in the United Kingdom, and in the Netherlands where it reached No. 1.

Shortly after the song was recorded Smokie's tour bus suffered an accident during a hailstorm near Cologne, Germany. Barton was severely injured and died in intensive care. The rest of the band and Brown agreed to donate their royalties from the song to Barton's first wife.

=== 1990s–present ===
The band selected Mike Craft as its new lead singer. The band released The World and Elsewhere later that year, followed by Light a Candle — The Christmas Album.

In 1996, Alan Silson left the band to pursue a solo career. Mick McConnell, a member of the band's road crew, became the lead guitarist. They recorded their next album, Wild Horses – The Nashville Album (1998), in Nashville, Tennessee. In February 2001, Smokie released two cover albums, Uncovered and Uncovered Too.

In 2004, Smokie recorded a studio album, On the Wire, with eleven of the 14 songs written by the band themselves. In 2006, the band released the album From the Heart. Although mainly a compilation, it did contain three new tracks.

In 2010, Smokie gained new chart success with a CD of brand new material, Take a Minute. Released in Denmark in August of that year, it peaked at No. 3 on the Danish Albums Chart. Releases in the remainder of Scandinavia and Germany took place during October, with the single "Sally's Song (The Legacy Goes On)" — a continuation of the story of the other character in "Living Next Door to Alice" — also released.

On 16 April 2021 it was announced that Mike Craft had decided to retire after 26 years of service to the band. He was replaced by Pete Lincoln, former member of Andy Scott's Sweet.

Terry Uttley died on 16 December 2021 at the age of 70. At the time of his death, he was the last remaining original member who was still active with the band.

== Personnel ==
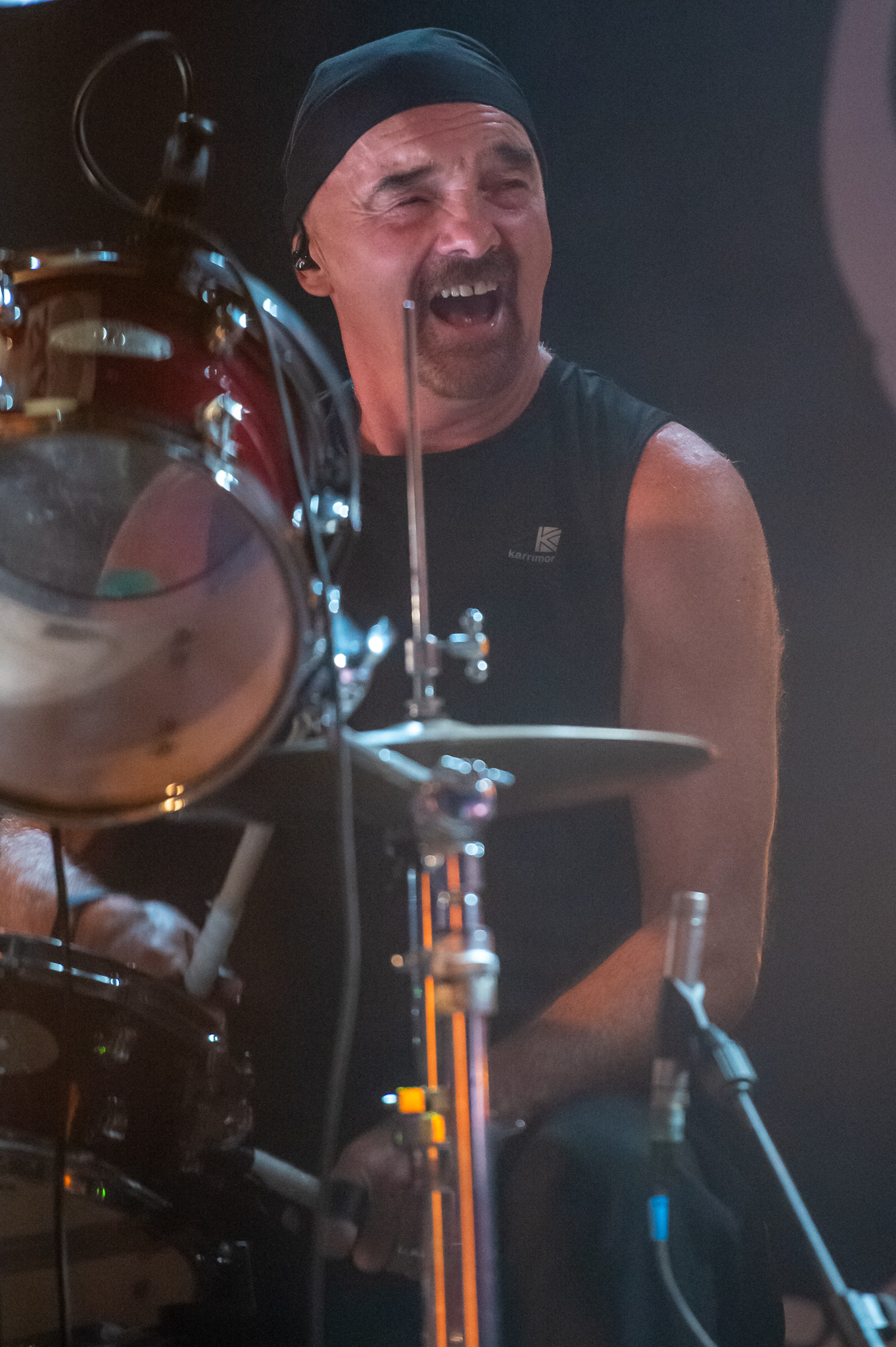
Steve Pinnell

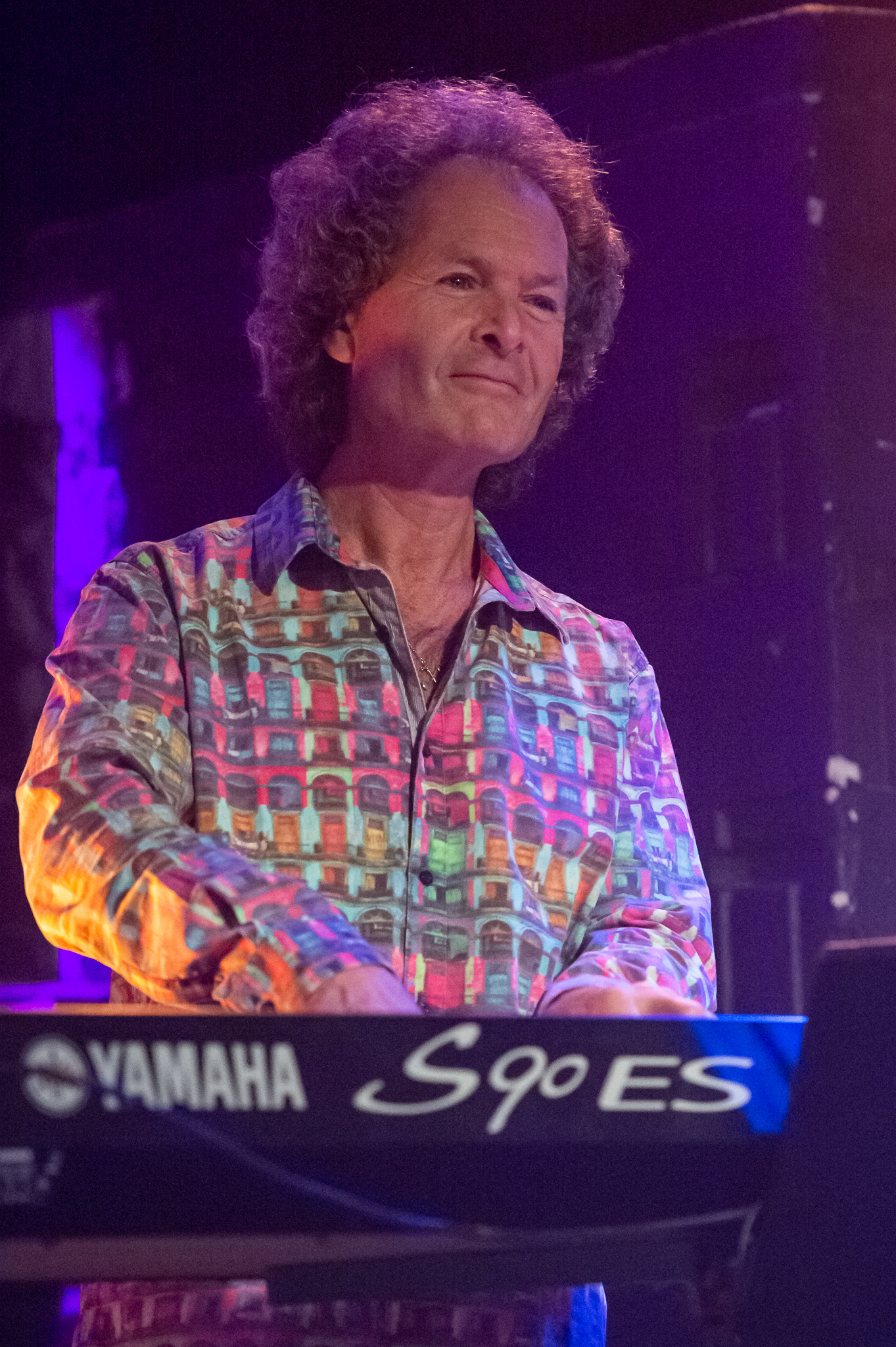
Martin Bullard

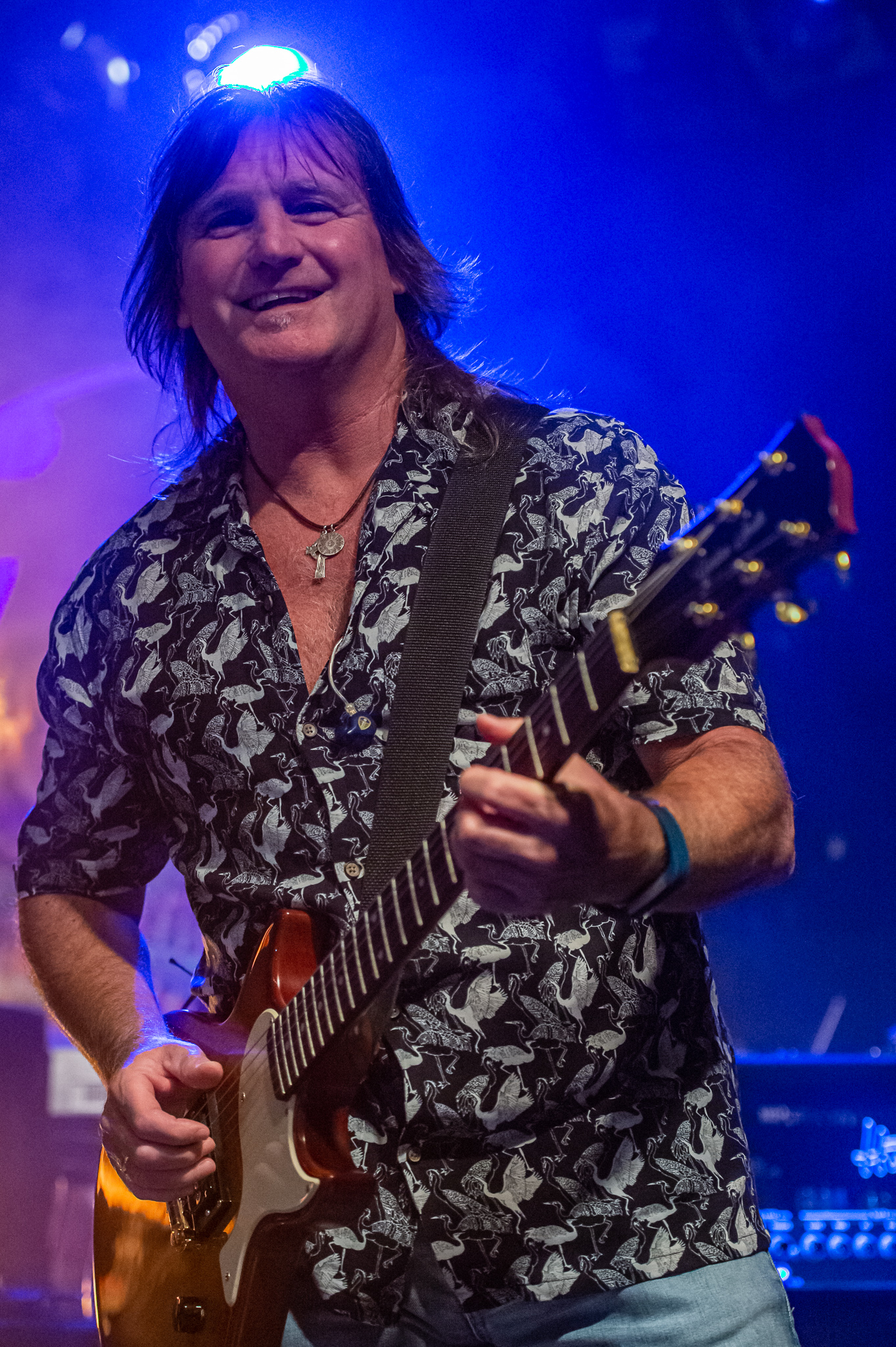
Mick McConnell

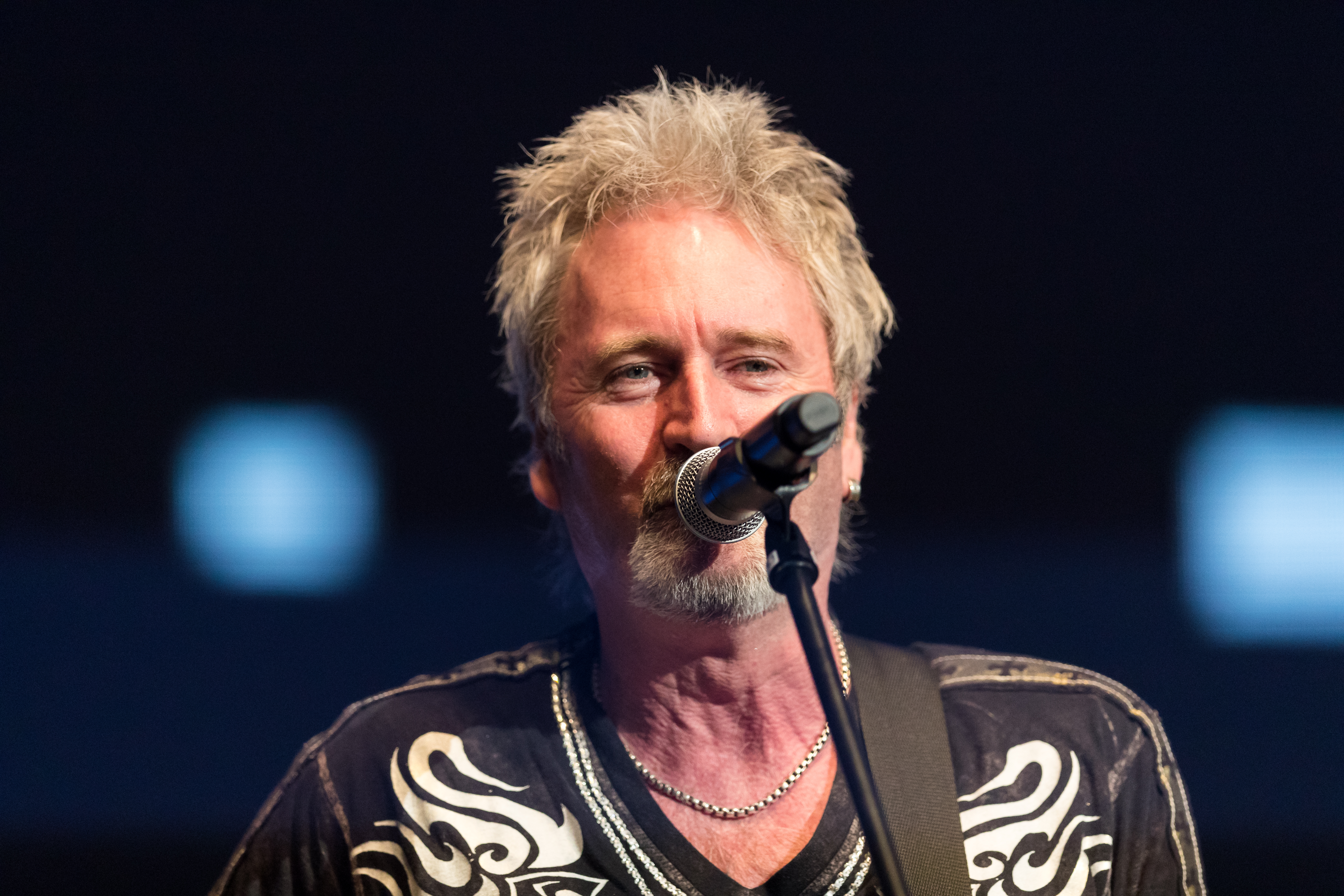
Pete Lincoln

=== Members ===
Current

- Steve Pinnell – drums (1986–present)
- Martin Bullard – keyboards (1986–present)
- Mick McConnell – lead guitar, vocals (1996–present)
- Pete Lincoln – lead vocals, rhythm guitar (2021–present)
- Luke Bullard – bass, vocals (2021–present; substitute 2019)

Former members

- Terry Uttley – bass, vocals (1964–1966, 1968–2021; his death)
- Arthur Higgins – bass, vocals (1966–1968)
- Alan Silson – lead guitar, vocals (1964–1996)
- Chris Norman – lead vocals, rhythm guitar, keyboards (1964–1986)
- Pete Spencer – drums, vocals (1973–1986)
- Alan Barton – lead vocals, rhythm guitar (1986–1995; his death)
- Mike Craft – lead vocals, rhythm guitar (1995–2021)

=== Lineups ===
1964–1966	Chris Norman – lead vocals, rhythm guitar, keyboards; Alan Silson – lead guitar, vocals; Terry Uttley – bass, vocals; Ron Kelly – drums
1966–1968	Chris Norman – lead vocals, rhythm guitar, keyboards; Alan Silson – lead guitar, vocals; Arthur Higgins – bass, vocals; Ron Kelly – drums
1968–1973	Chris Norman – lead vocals, rhythm guitar, keyboards; Alan Silson – lead guitar, vocals; Terry Uttley – bass, vocals; Ron Kelly – drums
1973–1986	Chris Norman – lead vocals, rhythm guitar, keyboards; Alan Silson – lead guitar, vocals; Terry Uttley – bass, vocals; Pete Spencer – drums
1986–1995	Alan Barton – lead vocals, rhythm guitar; Alan Silson – lead guitar, vocals; Terry Uttley – bass, vocals; Martin Bullard – keyboards; Steve Pinnell – drums
1995–1996	Mike Craft – lead vocals, rhythm guitar; Alan Silson – lead guitar, vocals; Terry Uttley – bass, vocals; Martin Bullard – keyboards; Steve Pinnell – drums
1996–2021	Mike Craft – lead vocals, rhythm guitar; Mick McConnell – lead guitar, vocals; Terry Uttley – bass, vocals; Martin Bullard – keyboards; Steve Pinnell – drums
2021	Pete Lincoln – lead vocals, rhythm guitar; Mick McConnell – lead guitar, vocals; Terry Uttley – bass, vocals; Martin Bullard – keyboards; Steve Pinnell – drums
2021–present	Pete Lincoln – lead vocals, rhythm guitar; Mick McConnell – lead guitar, vocals; Luke Bullard – bass, vocals; Martin Bullard – keyboards; Steve Pinnell – drums

== Discography ==
- Pass It Around (1975)
- Changing All the Time (1975)
- Midnight Café (1976)
- Bright Lights & Back Alleys (1977)
- The Montreux Album (1978)
- The Other Side of the Road (1979)
- Solid Ground (1981)
- Strangers in Paradise (1982)
- Midnight Delight (1982)
- All Fired Up (1988)
- Boulevard of Broken Dreams (1989)
- Whose Are These Boots? (1990)
- Chasing Shadows (1992)
- Burnin' Ambition (1993)
- The World and Elsewhere (1995)
- Light a Candle (1996)
- Wild Horses – The Nashville Album (1998)
- Uncovered (2000)
- Uncovered Too (2001)
- On the Wire (2004)
- Take a Minute (2010)

== Industry awards ==
Year	Nominee / work	Award	Result
1975	Best New Group	Saturday Scene British Pop Awards	Won
1977	Band	Gold Otto Bravo	Won
1978	Band	Gold Otto Bravo	Won
1978	Band	Silver Das Freiziet Freizeit Revue	Won
1979	Band	Silver Otto Bravo	Won
