= Sinderella =

Work based on Cinderella

Sinderella is a pantomime created by Jim Davidson and Bryan Blackburn. It is a sexually explicit derivative of Cinderella.

Conceived in Charlie Drake's dressing room at the Theatre Royal in Margate in 1990 in front of Drake and Ward Baker, the show initially featured Davidson as Buttons, Drake as Baron Hardon, Dianne Lee as Cinderella, Jess Conrad as Prince Charming, David Kristian as Dandini, Mia Carla as The Fairy Godmother, and Roger Kitter and Dave Lee as Camilla and Madonna the stepdaughters, all of whom had played either their own roles or comparable roles in civilised versions of the play. The show utilised several extra-large vibrators and a pantomime horse with a large penis as set-pieces, and the Fairy Godmother was flatulent. This version was mounted between 1993 and 1996 at various British theatres, and received largely negative critical reception.

Sinderella was later reworked and toured in 1997 and 2004 as Sinderella Comes Again. The 1997 tour omitted Drake but featured Deborah Corrigan as "Fairy Mark II" and the Oddballs as CIC, Dirty Mac, and M.C. Cucumber, while the 2004 tour omitted Corrigan but featured a voice performance from a now stricken Drake, and was greeted with positive reception. A further attempt at a sequel in 2015, Sinderella 2: A Scottish Romp, was cancelled mid-run after Davidson was accused of unacceptable behaviour.

== Background and conception ==
Jim Davidson first came to public attention after coming second in New Faces in 1976, having failed to get on to Opportunity Knocks the previous year, and using stand-up featuring stories of Chalky White, a Caribbean wide boy regularly in trouble with the police; Davidson was also known for his "nick nick" catchphrase, which he would deploy when telling police jokes. Davidson developed White for no reason other than he felt he could perform the accent, though the character was described by Sarah Hill in 2022 as melding "an egregious imitation of patois with an excess of bodily gestures deployed to connote 'West Indianness' in order to deliver material that confirmed intellectual deficiency". Mark Lawson wrote in The Guardian in 2006 that his targets during this period also included "the strange, smelly ways of women". Davidson released a 1980 cover version of "White Christmas" in character as White that peaked at No. 52 on the UK Singles Chart; he then played Jim London in Up the Elephant and Round the Castle between 1983 and 1985 and in Home James! between 1987 and 1990.

In 1990, Charlie Drake was performing in Dick Whittington and His Cat with Barry Howard and Ward Baker at the Theatre Royal in Margate. Davidson, a personal friend of Drake, had also played Whittington in versions of the play in the 1980s, in performances Mark Lawson described as "put[ting] the emphasis heavily on the hero's first name", and came to visit one night, where he, Drake, and Baker remained in Drake's dressing room until 3 a.m. drinking whisky. While there, Davidson conceived Sinderella in front of Drake and Baker as an adult version of Cinderella. Davidson, who had previously been playing Buttons in traditional versions of the play since 1978, wrangled several actors who had occupied similar roles; Dianne Lee, Jess Conrad, David Kristian, and Mia Carla, who had previously played Cinderella, Prince Charming, Dandini, and The Fairy Godmother respectively, reprised their roles, while Dave Lee and Roger Kitter, who played the stepdaughters Madonna and Camilla, had previously played the ugly sister Annie Hardup and Alexis the stepdaughter respectively and Charlie Drake, who played Baron Hardon, had previously played Baron Hard-up. Davidson co-wrote the play with Bryan Blackburn, who had been writing for Cinderella productions since 1971, and had written English lyrics for "Welcome Home", "Don't Stay Away Too Long", "Rainbow", and "Hey Mr. Music Man", which had been UK Top 20 hits for Dianne's group Peters and Lee.

== Performances and reception ==
=== 1993–1996: Sinderella ===
The play was previewed in January 1993 in Ealing, by which time Davidson had begun presenting the snooker-based game show Big Break (1991). Josh Widdicombe used his 2021 book Watching Neighbours Twice a Day...: How '90s TV (Almost) Prepared Me for Life to note that the programme's first broadcast episode featured Davidson flirting with a contestant until she mentioned she could not cook; upon her winning the episode, Davidson asserted that she would become wealthy without needing to divorce (by 1991, he was on his fourth marriage). Sinderella transferred to the Regent Theatre, Ipswich in February 1993, before going on tour the following spring and then running from 9 March to 2 July 1994 at Cambridge Theatre, returning in November. The show's set contained several extra-large vibrators and a pantomime horse with a large penis, and the Fairy Godmother was flatulent and left one scene mid-fart using a jet pack.

Reviewing a March 1994 showing, Ben Thompson of The Independent described the production as a "rotten pumpkin", found Davidson's "remorselessly priapic" Buttons to be making "frequent reference to failed marriages and drink-driving convictions", took offense at his ethnic jokes, and criticised Dianne's Sinderella for "lack[ing] spark"; he did however praise Drake's "Baron Hard-on" [sic]'s "compellingly obscene figure" for setting "the tone for a production that plumbs Shakespearian heights of bawdiness", and further noted that he was struck by "the naked flesh on display" being "almost all male" and wished that "Davidson's attitude to race was similarly enlightened". Later that month, the same publication's Mark Wareham was even less complimentary, saying that "old Nick Nick could not have produced a more down-market production had a think-tank from Big Break pooled their collective talents", and opined that Davidson was the only cast member not cringing.

In December, the show transferred to the Opera House Theatre, Blackpool, and then in January 1995, the show went on a 16-week tour of Great Britain. A VHS performance was released that year, using the pull quote "sexist, naughty, and totally outrageous" from a review in The Sun superimposed over a picture of a woman in front of Buttons leaning over and pulling up her skirt to reveal her stockings, suspenders, and bare buttocks. Reviewing a "seven-minute clip of the show" he had found online, Josh Widdicombe expressed his relief that it was "only seven minutes", and described what he had seen as "mainly a mix of jokes about the performers being pissed and blue puns, but not nearly as good as that makes it sound". This peaked at No. 17 on the UK Video Charts in October 1995 and June 1996, 34 weeks apart.

Drake retired in 1995 after suffering a stroke and moved into Brinsworth House. The show then ran in December 1996 at Bristol Hippodrome. The same month, The Independent's Matthew Sweet wrote that the adult pantomime was an "atrocity", and that both Sinderella and Pussy in Boots, Mike Reid's 1994 direct-to-video adult pantomime with John Altman and Barbara Windsor that had been described by the publication in December 1994 as "blue stand up masquerading as panto" and had entered the UK Video Chart that year at No. 23, had "besmirched" the genre's reputation, further describing Sinderella as "a lowest-common-denominator smutfest".

=== 1997–2007: Sinderella Comes Again ===
In January 1997, the show transferred to the Shaftesbury Theatre in London as Sinderella Comes Again, which lacked Drake but featured the characters CIC, Dirty Mac, and M.C. Cucumber, played by the Oddballs, and the character "Fairy Mark II", played by Deborah Corrigan, who Davidson would later date; their affair would cause the dissolution of his fourth marriage. The show then went on tour until May, which included two weeks between 22 April and 3 May at the Shaftesbury Theatre. Davidson would later perform a second adult pantomime, Boobs in the Wood, which was released on video in 1999, and peaked at No. 41 on the UK Video Chart.

In 2004, Davidson would revive Sinderella Comes Again, which featured the Oddballs and all of the original Sinderella cast, including Drake as "the voice of the late Baron Hard-On" [sic]; Drake was in poor health in 2004, and the following year the Richmond and Twickenham Times reported that he was living in Brinsworth House. Jess Conrad would later regale his experience of working with Drake for the 2021 book Forgotten Heroes of Comedy: An Encyclopedia of the Comedy Underdog. According to the show's website, the show ran between 1 March and 24 April 2004, and visited Orchard Theatre, Dartford, Royal & Derngate, Theatre Royal, Nottingham, Birmingham Hippodrome, Cliffs Pavilion, Mayflower Theatre, Regent Theatre, Ipswich, and New Wimbledon Theatre.

David Jackson of the BBC was positive about their Nottingham performance, saying that "a clever script (vaguely stuck to throughout!), great local ad-libbing from [Davidson], and a funny mix of supporting actors [...] made for an entertaining evening", although Theatre Royal later revised its programming policy to exclude adult pantomimes. Reviewing a Birmingham performance, the BBC's theatre correspondent Andy Knowles found the performance "laddish, sexist, crude, lewd", "downright rude", and "extremely funny", and singled out the "ultra-sweet, ultra-demure Dianne Lee" for praise, saying that "her sugary smile and embarrassing innocence provide the perfect foil for every sexual innuendo going". A performance would later be released for home video, making No. 56 on the UK DVD Chart and No. 52 on the UK Video Chart. In 2007, Universal Pictures released Jim Davidson: Comedy Collection, which rounded up Sinderella, Boobs in the Wood, and Sinderella Comes Again.

=== 2012–2015: A Scottish Romp ===
In 2012, having married his fifth wife three years earlier, Davidson performed as Buttons at the Pavilion Theatre in Glasgow for the play Sinderella: A Scottish Romp. Three years later, by which time Davidson had experienced an increase in popularity having won a series of Celebrity Big Brother the previous year, he attempted to mount a sequel, Sinderella 2: A Scottish Romp at the same theatre, which featured Deone Robertson and Nicola Park. The show was advertised with posters bearing a picture of him smirking while holding the legs of a grimacing woman half his age; people used Sharpies to annotate the poster next to his stage door, writing "racist" and "cunt" on his forehead. Liam Turbett of Vice reckoned that the poster's "gratuitous, Carry-On style sexism" "could keep an undergrad gender studies class occupied for months".

The play's plot focused on Sinderella's inability to attend a ball to meet "Bonnie Prince Long Cock" on the grounds that she was menstruating, contained scenes of Sinderella attempting to purchase tampons from a shopkeeper with an Asian accent played by Davidson, and made numerous references to shortbread, Braveheart, Davidson's Operation Yewtree arrest, the nearby pub, and Linford Christie. Turbett noted that the "show would have been bad enough had it been performed competently, but it continually veered into oblivion as no one could quite remember their lines" and that this "seemed ostensibly to be half the fun", before praising the show's backing dancers for being "professional enough to [...] actually complete their choreographed dancing" despite Davidson's "leering eyes" and "nod-and-wink homophobia".

The show was booked to run between 11 and 21 March. During the 19 March showing, having been told not to drink on site by the pub's manager after he found two empty wine bottles in his dressing room, and having been further aggravated after his wife was barred from entering the stage door, Davidson spent the show's intermission at the Atholl Arms in Renfield Street still wearing his costume, drunk more alcohol than usual, and whinged on stage that the audience were able to drink alcohol on site while he and the rest of the cast were not. The day after, the Pavilion posted on their Facebook page that they had cancelled the 20 and 21 March showings, citing "health and safety and staffing concerns"; the Pavilion's manager blamed Davidson's "entirely unacceptable" behaviour, and several staff members variously accused him of reacting to his wife's stage door non-admission by kicking it open and leaving in a strop, of using his Atholl Arms trip to criticise the Pavilion, its staff, Sinderella, and Glasgow audiences, and of using his post-intermission return to the Pavilion to berate both the manager and a female member of staff. Davidson denied being "abusive to anybody", saying that the pantomime's cancellation was a combination of poor ticket sales and the manager asserting power, and stated that the show would never be performed again.
