= Dianne Lee =

British singer and actress

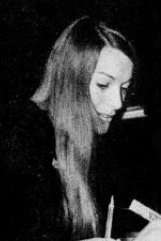
- Lee in 1975

Background information
- Also known as: Dianne Lee
- Born: Dianne Littlehales; February 1949 (age 76); Sheffield, England
- Occupations: Musician, actress
- Instrument: Vocals
- Years active: 1960s–present
- Formerly of: Peters and Lee

Dianne Littlehales, known professionally as Dianne Lee, is an English singer and actress from Sheffield. She is best known for being one half of the musical duo Peters and Lee.

== Early life ==
Dianne Littlehales was born in Sheffield. She started to attend a local dancing school after her brother and sister joined, and made her first public performances at the age of four. When she left school, she worked as a chorus line dancer, before performing in pantomimes, theatre, and cabaret. She moved to London in 1968 for television and stage work with her cousin Liz and joined the Pamela Devis Dancers, the resident dance troupe at the London Palladium, before she and Liz formed the Hailey Twins and toured the provincial nightclub circuit.

== Career ==
=== Peters and Lee ===
In 1970, after Liz implied that she wanted to go solo, Lennie Peters, who frequently shared bills with the Hailey Twins, instructed Lee to allow her to do so and suggested that she form a duo with him. Initially called Lennie Peters and Melody, their name was changed by management to avoid connotations of being a reggae act, and Peters and Lee toured the Northern club circuit for three years and then made six appearances on Opportunity Knocks, prompting Philips Records to sign them; they would later enter the UK Singles Chart with "Welcome Home" (No. 1, 15–21 July 1973), "By Your Side" (No. 39), "Don't Stay Away Too Long" (No. 3), "Rainbow" (No. 17), and "Hey Mr. Music Man" (No. 16) and the UK Albums Chart with We Can Make It (No. 1, 12–25 August 1973), By Your Side (No. 9), Rainbow (No. 6), Favourites (No. 2), and Invitation (No. 44). The duo broke up in 1980, but got back together in 1986 to tour vacation resorts and release a self-titled album in 1989; they continued to perform until 1992, when Peters announced he was suffering from cancer, which would claim his life later that year. Lee then went into acting, and performed in cabaret.

=== Pantomime ===
In 1981, she appeared in the pantomime Sleeping Beauty and in Cannon and Ball's show at Great Yarmouth. In 1988, she appeared in the pantomime Cinderella, with Jim Davidson as Buttons.

In 1993, she started appearing in Sinderella, Jim Davidson's priapic take on the show, which ran until 1996, when it became Sinderella Comes Again, which she played in 1997 and 2004. Writing in 1994, Ben Thompson of The Independent felt that Lee "lacked spark", while the BBC's theatre correspondent Andy Knowles was more positive in a 2004 review, saying that her "sugary smile and embarrassing innocence provide the perfect foil for every sexual innuendo going".

== Personal life ==
Lee married Rick Price of the Move and Wizzard. In a 2001 interview with Cherry Blossom Clinic, a Move fansite, Price asserted that the pair met in January 1976 after Laurie Mansfield hired him as their tour manager, and that he managed Lee's solo tour for a year until he got a job managing Jim Davidson's show. He also stated that he and Lee set up their own studios in 1985 and that this produced Peters and Lee's final studio album, Through All the Years, plus a solo Lee album, Chemistry, a joint Lee and Price live album, and several of Davidson's comedy albums. Price also asserted that in 1999, she and Price began touring as a joint act, which contained both Price's and Lee's tracks, and that Lee had been gigging continuously until that point. Price died in May 2022.
