= Lennie Peters =

British singer (1931–1992)

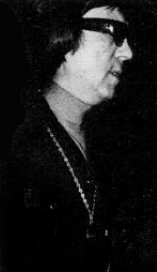
- Peters in 1975

Background information
- Born: Leonard George Sargent; 22 November 1931; Islington, England, UK
- Died: 10 October 1992 (aged 60)
- Instruments: Vocals, piano
- Years active: 1950s–1992
- Formerly of: The Migil Five; Peters and Lee

Leonard George Sargent (22 November 1931 — 10 October 1992), stage name Lennie Peters, was a British singer. He was one half of the folk and pop duo Peters and Lee with Dianne Lee.

== Early life ==
Peters was born in Islington, London to fishmonger John Seargant. He was one of six boys. He was born a natural singer and taught himself how to play piano.

== Career ==
Lennie began singing in working men's clubs in the 1950s. In 1960, Peters formed The Migil Five to be his backing band; he left the group before they had their hit song "Mockin' Bird Hill". He made his radio debut in 1963 on BBC's Town & Country show. In 1968, he met Dianne Lee and formed the duo Peters and Lee. In 1973, they won seven episodes in a row of Opportunity Knocks, which at the time was a record breaking amount. Their first single, "Welcome Home", released in 1973, went to number one in the UK and Ireland.

Between April-May 1976, they hosted a six-part television show, Meet Peters & Lee. The duo split up in 1980. Peters took up acting and had a role as a crime boss in the 1984 film The Hit. Peters also re-started his solo career, putting out a few records, none of which were successful and an album, Unforgettable, in 1981. He reunited with Dianne on three occasions; 1986, 1989 and 1992.

== Eyesight ==
Peters had complete loss of sight in each eye, caused by two separate incidents during his childhood:

His left eye was blinded in a car crash when he was five years old. His right eye was blinded during an incident when he was sixteen in the summer of 1948 when a gang of hooligans threw stones at him while he was sunbathing, Peters stood up and politely asked the gang to stop, which led to one of them throwing a brick in his face; while in hospital the doctors informed him that his right eye's vision could be saved however when Lennie saw an old man on his ward who was about to fall out of his bed, he quickly stood up to save him, but unfortunately the strain of doing this detached the retina in the eye, and he permanently lost sight in that eye (the old man died the next day).

== Personal life ==
Peters met his wife, Sylvia, at a nightclub. They were married and had two children. Lennie was the uncle to Charlie Watts, drummer for The Rolling Stones. Peters died from bone cancer in October 1992.

On 3 August 2005, Peters' daughter, Lisa Sullivan, was murdered by her boyfriend, Terry Game, after strangling her at a caravan park in Walton-on-the-Naze; she was 41.

== Discography ==
Albums

- Unforgettable (1981)

Singles

- "And My Heart Cried / For A Lifetime" — Oriole — November 1963
- "Love Me, Love Me / Let The Tears Begin" — Oriole — 25 September 1964
- "Stranger In Paradise / Behind My Smile" — Pye — 22 April 1966
- "Here We Go Again / For A Lifetime" — Gemini — 6 March 1970
- "This Is A Record Of My Love (Happy Birthday, Darling) / I Just Need You" — EMI — 24 April 1981
- "Why Me / I've Got Faith In You" — Lifestyle — December 1982
- "Key Largo / I Love Both Of You" — Relax — November 1985

== Filmography ==
- Meet Peters & Lee — himself — six episodes — 1976
- The Hit — Mr Corrigan — film — 1984
- The Conway Brothers Hiccups Orchestra — himself — short film — 1984
