= Peters and Lee discography =

- Studio albums: 11
- Compilation albums: 7
- Singles: 23

This is the discography of British folk and pop duo Peters and Lee.

== Albums ==
=== Studio albums ===
Title	Album details	Peak chart positions	Certifications
Title	Album details	UK	Certifications
We Can Make It	Released: June 1973; Label: Philips; Formats: LP, MC, 8-track	1	BPI: Gold
By Your Side	Released: December 1973; Label: Philips; Formats: LP, MC, 8-track	9	BPI: Gold
Rainbow	Released: September 1974; Label: Philips; Formats: LP, MC, 8-track	6	BPI: Gold
Favourites	Released: September 1975; Label: Philips; Formats: LP, MC, 8-track	2	BPI: Gold
Serenade	Released: May 1976; Label: Philips; Formats: LP, MC, 8-track	—	BPI: Silver
Invitation	Released: December 1976; Label: Philips; Formats: LP, MC	44	BPI: Silver
Smile	Released: November 1977; Label: Philips; Formats: LP, MC	—	
Love and Affection	Released: June 1979; Label: Arcade; Formats: LP, MC	—	
The Farewell Album	Released: December 1980; Label: Celebrity; Formats: LP, MC	—	
Peters & Lee	Released: 1989; Label: President; Formats: CD, LP, MC	—	
Through All the Years	Released: 17 February 1992; Label: Galaxy Music; Formats: CD, MC	—	
"—" denotes releases that did not chart or were not released in that territory.

=== Compilation albums ===
Title	Album details
Love Will Keep Us Together	Released: 1978; Label: St Michael; Formats: LP
Spotlight on Peters & Lee	Released: September 1979; Label: Philips; Formats: 2xLP
Remember When	Released: October 1980; Label: Philips; Formats: LP, MC
Yesterday and Today	Released: May 1983; Label: Cambra; Formats: 2xLP, 2xMC
Welcome Home	Released: 1997; Label: Hallmark; Formats: CD
The Best of Peters & Lee	Released: 1999; Label: Spectrum Music; Formats: CD
Welcome Home: The Collection	Released: 13 January 2014; Label: Spectrum Music; Formats: CD, digital download

== Singles ==
Title	Year	Peak chart positions							Albums
Title	Year	UK	AUS	IRE	NL	US	US AC	US Country	Albums
"Welcome Home"	1973	1	12	1	—	119	26	79	We Can Make It
"By Your Side"	1973	39	—	—	—	—	—	—	By Your Side
"Don't Stay Away Too Long"	1974	3	92	5	—	—	—	—	Rainbow
"Rainbow"	1974	17	—	11	—	—	—	—	Rainbow
"Closer"	1974	53 (Note: Chart position is from the official UK "Breakers List".)	—	—	—	—	—	—	Favourites
"(Hey Won't You Play) Another Somebody Done Somebody Wrong Song"	1975	—	—	—	—	—	—	—	Non-album single
"The Crying Game"	1975	—	—	—	—	—	—	—	Favourites
"Hey, Mr Music Man"	1976	16	—	7	—	—	—	—	Invitation
"The Serenade That We Played"	1976	—	—	—	—	—	—	—	Serenade
"What Is Love"	1976	53	—	—	—	—	—	—	Non-album single
"Save Me (Feel Myself A-Fallin')"	1976	—	—	—	—	—	—	—	Serenade
"The Song from Moulin Rouge" (Netherlands and Belgium-only release)	1977	—	—	—	23	—	—	—	Non-album single
"Smile"	1977	—	—	—	—	—	—	—	Smile
"Let Love Come Between Us"	1977	—	—	—	—	—	—	—	Smile
"Suspicious Minds"	1978	—	—	—	—	—	—	—	Smile
"Love (Loving Time)"	1978	—	—	—	—	—	—	—	Non-album singles
"People Over the World"	1979	—	—	—	—	—	—	—	Non-album singles
"I Understand (Just How You Feel)"	1980	—	—	—	—	—	—	—	Non-album singles
"Ocean and Blue Sky"	1980	—	—	—	—	—	—	—	The Farewell Album
"Familiar Feeling"	1986	—	—	—	—	—	—	—	Non-album single
"Isle of Debris"	1989	—	—	—	—	—	—	—	Peters & Lee
"Peace Must Come Again"	1989	—	—	—	—	—	—	—	Peters & Lee
"Welcome Home" (re-release after use in an advert for Walker's Crisps)	1995	—	—	—	—	—	—	—	Non-album single
"—" denotes releases that did not chart or were not released in that territory.
