= Spike Mullins =

Comedian and Writer (1915-1994)

Dennis Jeremiah (Spike) Mullins (2 October 1915 – 18 April 1994) was a comedy performer and writer who wrote for many established performers, such as Max Bygraves and Harry Secombe, Kenneth Williams and Frankie Howerd.

One of his famous work is scripting Ronnie Corbett's seated monologues during The Two Ronnies TV series in the UK. He also worked, together with Barry Cryer as a writer for the groundbreaking British TV programme The Frost Report, where Corbett first met his later performing partner, Ronnie Barker.

== Early life ==
Mullins was born in London during World War I to working-class parents. The Mullins family lived near a film studio, and the infant Spike was frequently used in silent movies. While still in his teens, he signed on as galley boy on a cargo ship, After four years, he returned home to work as a stevedore, which he did until the outbreak of World War II, At this point he joined the RAF. After his release from the RAF in 1945, he did a number of manual jobs while attempting to make a living at comedy writing; he met with little success. After marrying, he stopped writing and spent the next 16 years supporting his growing family in a number of manual jobs.

== Career ==
Finally, in 1963, after encouragement from his wife, he sent some material to Max Bygraves, and received a positive response. Mullins began his writing career as an occasional contributor to The Frost Report, whose writers included Marty Feldman and Dick Vosburgh. The show was a focus for a significant amount of writing and performing talent who would go on to be successful, being responsible, at least in part, for Monty Python's Flying Circus and The Goodies, as well as The Two Ronnies.

By this stage, Mullins was significantly older than the mostly Oxbridge-educated team that was around him. As such, he concentrated more on co-writing with Cryer (which included writing for Harry Secombe's solo vehicle, The Harry Secombe Show), and Colin Bostock-Smith on the Jim Davidson show, Up the Elephant and Round the Castle. He also contributed material to the game show Family Fortunes. He also wrote an autobiography, entitled Me, To Name But A Few.
