= Jess Conrad =

British actor and singer (born 1936)

Jess Conrad OBE
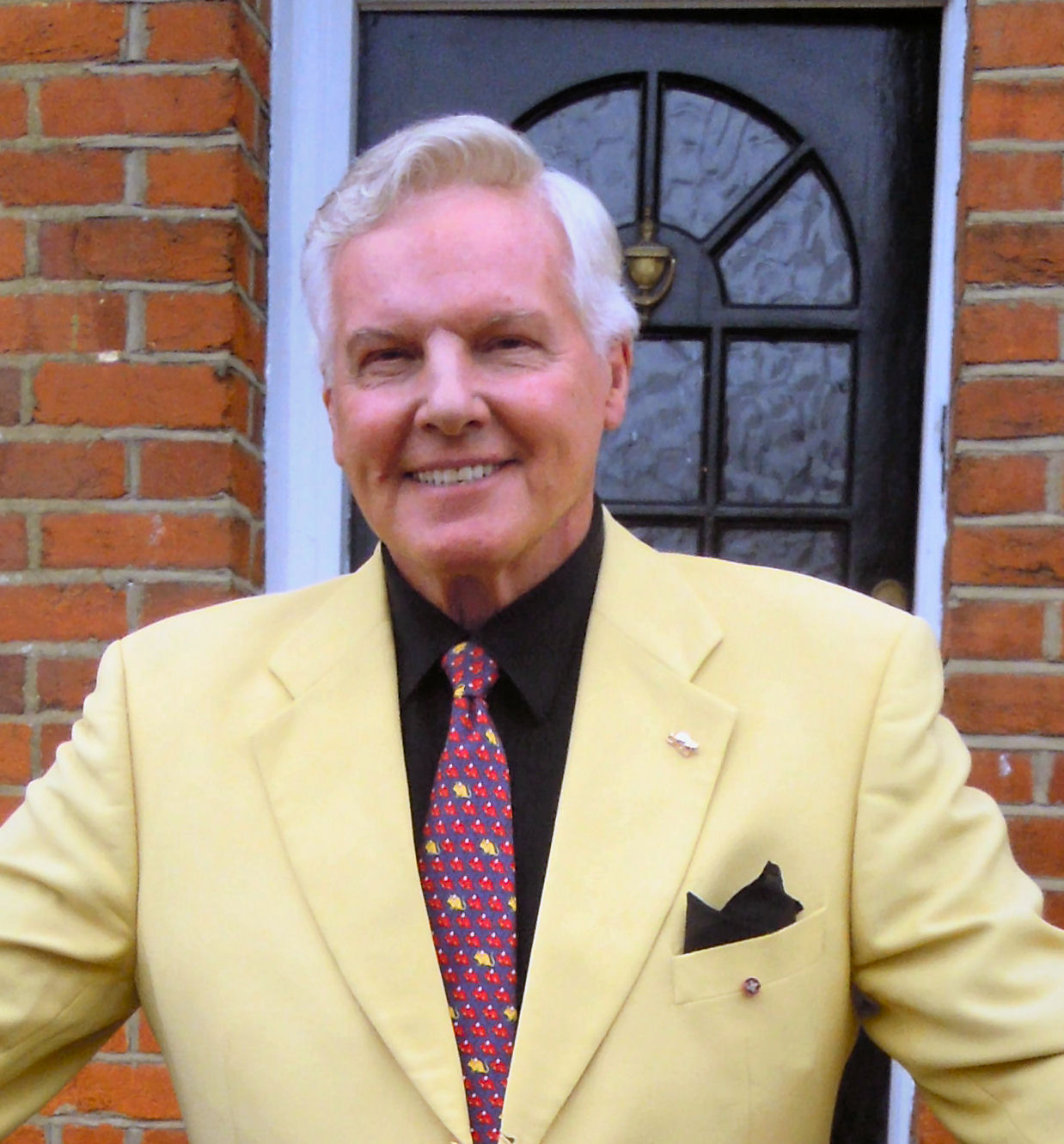
- Conrad in 2017
- Born: Gerald Arthur James; 24 February 1936 (age 90); Brixton, London, England
- Occupations: Actor, singer
- Spouse: Renee Bergman (m. 1963)
- Children: 2
- Website: jessconrad.com

Jess Conrad (born Gerald Arthur James; 24 February 1936) is an English stage and screen actor and singer. As a boy he was nicknamed "Jesse" after American outlaw Jesse James; as there was already an actor named "Gerald James" in Actors' Equity, a drama teacher who was a fan of writer Joseph Conrad suggested the stage name of "Jess Conrad".

== Biography ==
Conrad was born in Brixton, South London and started his career as a repertory actor and film extra, before being cast in a television play, Bye, Bye Barney, as a pop singer. He was noticed by Jack Good, who included him in his TV series Oh Boy!. Conrad then was signed to Decca Records and had a number of chart hits, including "Cherry Pie", "This Pullover", "Mystery Girl" and "Pretty Jenny"; also recording for Columbia, Pye President and EMI.

Between the late 1950s and mid-1960s, Conrad appeared in a number of films such as Serious Charge (uncredited), The Boys, Rag Doll, (filmed in 1960, and released in 1961); K.I.L. 1 and Konga as well as Michael Powell's The Queen's Guards. Conrad played Danny Pace in an episode of The Human Jungle called "The Flip Side Man" in 1963.

During the 1970s, he spent some time in the stage shows Godspell and Joseph and the Amazing Technicolor Dreamcoat, and also featured in a cameo role in the Sex Pistols film The Great Rock 'n' Roll Swindle. In 1977, seven of Conrad's singles were included in the 'World's Worst Record' list, chosen by listeners to Capital FM DJ Kenny Everett's show, and "This Pullover", voted sixth worst song ever, later featured on The World's Worst Record Show, a 1978 LP dedicated to the songs voted for, together with two other Conrad recordings "Cherry Pie" and "Why Am I Living?"

Conrad made an appearance in Are You Being Served as Mr Walpole, head of sporting equipment, in the episode "Memories Are Made of This". Conrad also appeared in the 1984 TV series of Miss Marple, in the episode entitled The Body in the Library as Raymond Starr. He also starred in the 1993 film The Punk and the Princess.

In the 1990s, Conrad made regular cameo appearances on Jim Davidson's revived version of The Generation Game on BBC1. In 1992, Conrad appeared in the Christmas Special of Big Break, also presented by Davidson and John Virgo. He was the "booby" prize of the show presented to actress Ruth Madoc.

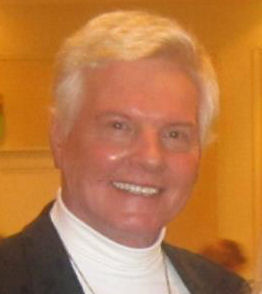
Conrad in 2014

Since then, Conrad has appeared in a number of documentaries and television programmes. In a BBC Arena documentary about the record producer Joe Meek, Conrad said that he bit off part of the nose of the singer Heinz during a confrontation backstage at a package show in the early 1960s. In 2005, Conrad had a guest role in the sitcom Last of the Summer Wine.

In the 2009 film Telstar: The Joe Meek Story, Conrad is played by Nigel Harman. Conrad also plays the role of Larry Parnes in the film. In 2016 Conrad appeared in Liam Galvin's crime thriller film Mob Handed, playing a corrupt judge. In October 2022, he appeared in the BBC soap opera Doctors as Alan Yates. In 2023, Conrad filmed a leading role in the film Somebody's Daughter written by Zara Phillips.

== Awards ==
Conrad is a member of the show business fraternity the Grand Order of Water Rats, having served as "King Rat". He is also a Freemason and a member of Chelsea Lodge No. 3098, the membership of which is made up of entertainers. He was appointed an Officer of the Order of the British Empire (OBE) in the 2011 Queen's Birthday Honours for charitable services. In 2018, he appeared in ITV's Last Laugh in Vegas.

== Personal life ==
Conrad is married to Renee; the couple have two children. He described the actress Diana Dors as "the best friend I ever had".

== Selected discography ==
- "Cherry Pie" / "There's Gonna Be A Day" 1960
- "Out of Luck" / "Unless You Mean It" Decca UK 1960
- "Mystery Girl" / "Just The Two of Us" / "(I Wanna) Love My Life Away" / "Maybe You'll Be There" 1961 [EP]
- "Mystery Girl" / "The Big White House" 1961
- "This Pullover" / "Why Am I Living" 1961
- "I See You" / "Oh! You Beautiful Doll" 1961
- "Every Breath I Take" / "Walk Away" 1961
- "Twist My Wrist" / "Hey Little Girl" 1961

== Filmography ==
=== Film ===
Year	Title	Role	Notes
1955	The Cockleshell Heroes	Sailor in Pub	Uncredited
1956	Who Done It?	Man Walking around Radio Show	Uncredited
1956	Wicked as They Come	Dancer in Club	Uncredited
1956	My Teenage Daughter	Dancer	Uncredited
1956	The Extra Day	Boxing Match Spectator	Uncredited
1956	Reach for the Sky	Cadet Pilot	Uncredited
1958	Further Up the Creek	Signalman	Uncredited
1959	Serious Charge	Dancer	Uncredited
1959	The Ugly Duckling	Bimbo	
1959	Friends and Neighbours	Buddy Fisher	
1959	Follow a Star	Theatre Heckler	Uncredited
1960	Too Young to Love	Peter Martin	
1961	Konga	Bob Kenton	
1961	Rag Doll	Shane	
1961	The Queen's Guards	Dankworth	
1962	K.I.L. 1	Ted-o	
1962	The Boys	Barney Lee	
1963	Aliki	Barry Wilson	
1964	The Golden Head	Michael Stevenson	
1965	The Amorous Adventures of Moll Flanders	First Mohock	
1967	Hell Is Empty	Jess Shepherd	
1969	The Assassination Bureau	Angelo	
1970	Cool It Carol!	Jonathan	
1972	The Flesh and Blood Show	Young Actor	
1980	The Great Rock 'n' Roll Swindle	Jess	
1985	Claudia	Man at Deli	
1986	Absolute Beginners	Cappuccino Man	
1989	Tank Malling	Celebrity	
1993	The Punk	Rachel's Father	
1995	Sinderella Live	Prince Charming	
2004	Sinderella Comes Again	Prince Charming	
2008	Telstar: The Joe Meek Story	Larry Parnes	
2011	Zero	Lottery Presenter	
2012	Run for Your Wife	Piano Player	Cameo
2016	Mob Handed	The Judge	
2024	Somebody's Daughter	TBA	

=== Television ===
Year	Title	Role	Notes
1959	ITV Television Playhouse	Barnie Day	Episode: "Rock-a-Bye Barnie"
1959	Probation Officer	Lofty	Episode: 1.8
1959	The Four Just Men	Carl Willett	Episode: "Panic Button"
1960	Someone Who Cares	Ricky	TV film
1960	The Odd Man	Cliff	3 episodes
1961	Dixon of Dock Green	Mike Jarrod	Episode: "The Burn-Up"
1962	No Hiding Place	Johnny Burrows	Episode: "The Front Man"
1963	Armchair Theatre	Bell Hop	Episode: "The Paradise Suite"
1963	The Human Jungle	Danny Pace	Episode: "The Flip Side Man"
1965	Who Is Mary Morison?	Bobby	TV film
1965	No Hiding Place	Mick	Episode: "A Fistful of Trouble"
1967	Thirty-Minute Theatre	Davo	Episode: "The Gun"
1970	From a Bird's Eye View	Clem Tiptree	2 episodes
1970	Softly, Softly: Task Force	David Marks	Episode: "Who Wants Pride...?"
1976	Space: 1999	Mark Sanders	Episode: "The Lambda Factor"
1978	Crossroads	Philip Bailey	3 episodes
1983	Are You Being Served?	Mr. Walpole	Episode: "Memories Are Made of This"
1984	The Body in the Library	Raymond Starr	All 3 episodes
1996	Bodger and Badger	Mr. Jelly	Episode: "Here Comes Smarty Pants!"
2005	Last of the Summer Wine	Walker	Episode: "Who's That Mouse in the Poetry Group?"
2018	Last Laugh In Vegas	Himself	All 5 episodes
2020	Autopsy: The Last Hours of...	Adam West	Episode: "Adam West"
2022	Doctors	Alan Yates	Episode: "Safe Pair of Hands"
