= The Migil Five =

British pop band

- Origin: London, England
- Genres: Pop, rhythm and blues, jazz
- Years active: 1960–1971
- Labels: Pye, Columbia, Jay Boy
- Past members: Gilbert "Gil" Lucas; Mike Felix; Lenny Blanche; Stan "Red" Lambert; Alan "Earl" Watson; Norman Langford

The Migil Five (sometimes styled The Migil 5) were a British pop, rhythm and blues and (originally) jazz group in the early to mid-1960s, whose biggest hit was a bluebeat version of "Mockin' Bird Hill".

== Career ==
The group's origins were in North London in 1960, as a backing group for club singer Lennie Peters. Its members at that time included pianist Gil Lucas (born Gilbert James Lucas, 20 September 1936, Kensington, South West London) and bass player Lenny Blanche (born Leonard Frederick Arthur Blanche, 1 June 1936, Woolwich, South East London). Various people - including, on occasions, Peters' nephew Charlie Watts, later of the Rolling Stones - stood in as drummer, until the position was filled more permanently by Mike Felix (born Michael Felix Staples, 18 February 1940, London). After Peters left for a solo career - going on to chart success in the 1970s as one half of Peters and Lee - Felix became the lead singer, and the group recruited guitarist Stan "Red" Lambert (born Stanley Frank Lambert, September 24, 1937?, London). They named themselves The Migil Four, drawing on the names of Mike Felix and Gilbert Lucas.

The group played a mixture of pop, R&B and jazz music on the cabaret circuit until they were seen by trad jazz bandleader Kenny Ball. He performed onstage with them, and recommended them to his record label, Pye Records. Their first single, "Maybe", was released in 1963. They then added tenor saxophonist Alan "Earl" Watson (born Alan Michael Watson, 8 July 1940, Forest Gate, East London), formerly a member of Georgie Fame and the Blue Flames, so becoming The Migil 5, and won a residency at the Tottenham Royal dance hall, replacing the Dave Clark Five. Expanding their repertoire to cater for a younger audience, they recorded their second single, "Mockin' Bird Hill" - a country song which had been a US hit for Les Paul and Mary Ford - in a style then known as "bluebeat" and later as ska. It was released the same week as Millie Small's ska hit "My Boy Lollipop", and entered the UK Singles Chart in March 1964, rising to No. 10. It also reached number one in Ireland.

According to Bruce Eder at AllMusic:

"The Migil Five were an improbable outfit on the early-'60s London rock music scene. Five guys who were already in their late '20s and skilled in jazz, R&B, blues, folk, and pop, Lambert was balding and sported a beard and the others looked more like veterans of the '50s trad jazz scene. Watson brought a harder R&B sound that made them more appealing to teenagers, but they all looked more like music teachers than rock & rollers."

Their follow-up single, "Near You", reached No. 31 on the UK chart, and the band released an album in 1964, Mockin' Bird Hill. They appeared on television, and in two movie features, Swinging U.K. and U.K. Swings Again, later put together as Go Go Big Beat. Subsequent singles and an EP, Meet the Migil Five, failed to make the British chart, although the group remained popular in Ireland. By 1965, they had become the house band on the BBC radio show Easy Beat. They continued to record singles, with little success, and Felix left the group to go solo in 1966, with Watson taking over as singer. Watson in turn left in 1969, being replaced by Norman Langford, and the group finally broke up in 1971.

Mike Felix later worked as a comedian, after dinner speaker and actor, appearing in the TV series Widows and The Bill. Lucas moved into pub management and continued to play in local London bands until his death in the 1990s. Watson and Blanche also moved into the pub and restaurant business.

A CD compilation of The Migil Five was issued on Sequel Records in 1998.
