= Marlowe Theatre =

Theatre in Canterbury, England

The Marlowe Theatre
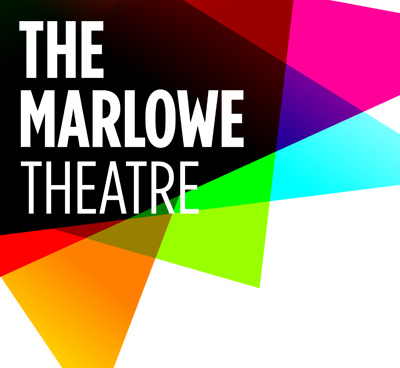
- Interactive map of The Marlowe Theatre
- Address: The Friars; Canterbury, Kent; United Kingdom
- Coordinates: 51.2810°N 1.0785°E
- Operator: Marlowe Trust
- Capacity: 1,200

Construction
- Opened: 1984
- Reopened: 4 October 2011
- Rebuilt: 2009–2011
- Years active: 1984–present
- Architect: Keith Williams

Website
- www.marlowetheatre.com

The Marlowe Theatre is a 1,200-seat theatre in Canterbury named after playwright Christopher Marlowe, who was born and attended school in the city. It was named a Stage Awards, 2022 UK Theatre of the Year.

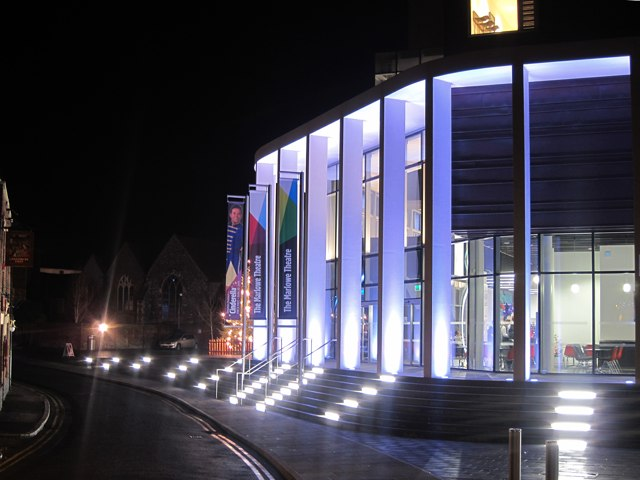
Theatre at night

The Marlowe Trust, a not for profit company and registered charity, operates the theatre.

== History ==
=== First building ===
A theatre opened on St Margaret's Street, Canterbury shortly before World War I but was converted to the Central Picture Cinema in the 1920s. That building reopened as The Marlowe Theatre in 1949, originally for amateur dramatics, and then repertory. After financial difficulties in 1981, it was demolished the following year to make way for the Marlowe Arcade of Whitefriars Shopping Centre.

=== Second building ===
The Marlowe's second home, in The Friars, was built in 1933, by Oscar Deutsch's Odeon Cinema business as the Friars Cinema. On 11 May 1944 the film A Canterbury Tale received its world premiere there. The cinema was renamed the Odeon in 1955.

During the late 1970s and early 1980s Canterbury Odeon hosted a number of major acts, including The Cure and Joy Division.

The building was purchased and renovated by Canterbury City Council, at a cost of £2.35 million, and opened as the second Marlowe Theatre in July 1984.

The theatre lacked capacity for major touring works and the long rake of seating was less suitable for theatre than cinema. It closed for redevelopment on 22 March 2009.

=== Marlowe Memorial ===
The Muse of Poetry statue outside the building references Christopher Marlowe as the Muses' darling, surrounded by characters from his plays. It was relocated to stand outside the Marlowe Theatre in 1993 and unveiled by Ian McKellen.

=== Third Building ===
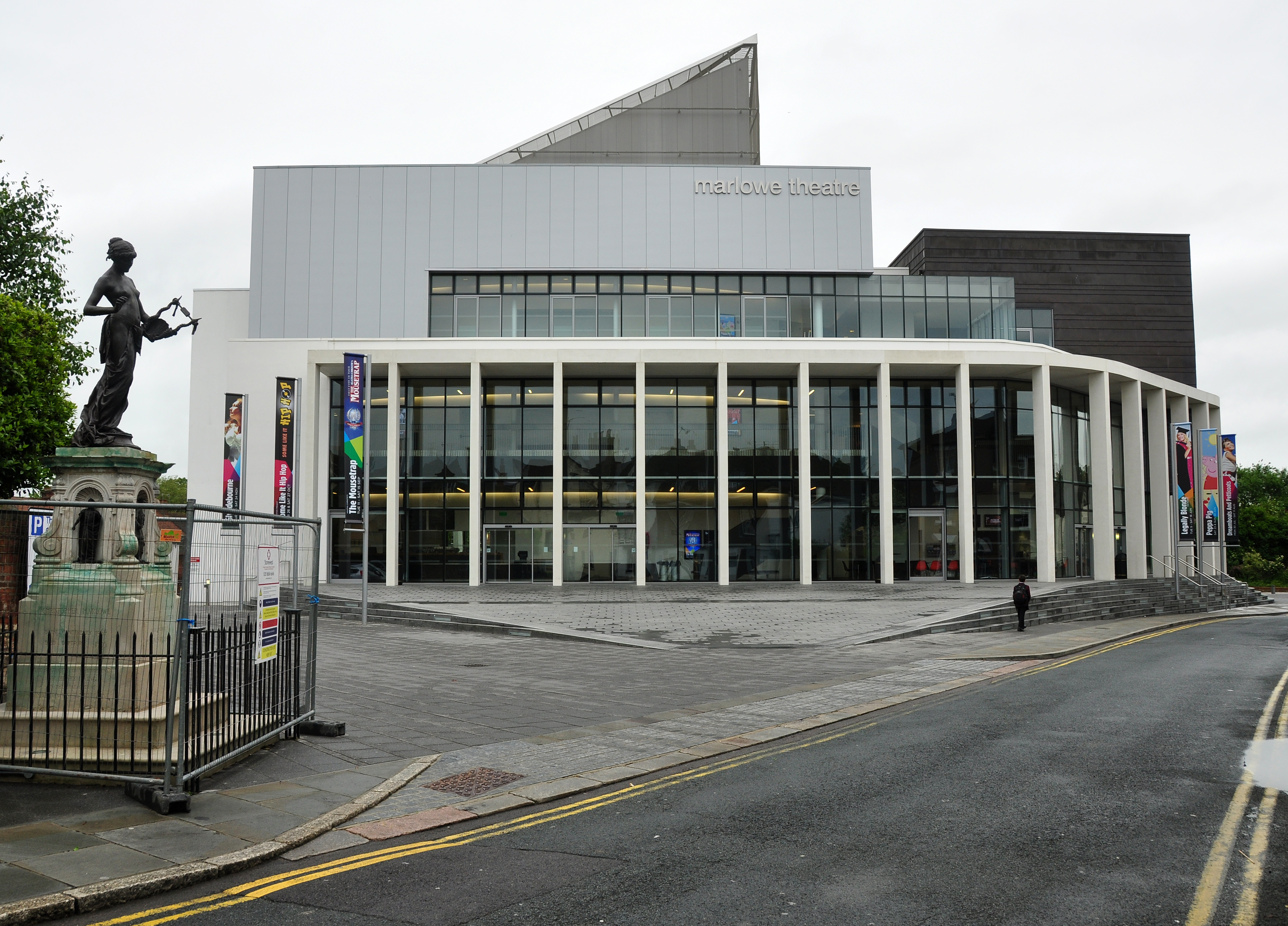
The Marlowe Theatre, 2011

Canterbury City Council was advised moving would cost more than redeveloping on the existing site and in 2005, approved a new Marlowe Theatre. It appointed Keith Williams architect for the project.

2008 budget cost was £25.6 million, of which £17 million was to come from the council. The scheme provided additional parking spaces for people with disabilities and a landscaped walk by the River Stour. Construction began in 2009 and the Earl of Wessex opened this third Marlowe Theatre on 4 October 2011.

Building works, unusually for a theatre, came in within budget, whilst The Guardian welcomed its sensible, thoughtful and competent architecture.

=== Dave Lee statue ===
In 2014, a bronze statue of pantomime dame and comedian Dave Lee was unveiled outside the Marlowe Theatre. He had performed over a thousand times there.

=== COVID-19 and the Marlowe Flatmates ===
As a result of 2020's COVID-19 pandemic the theatre closed and its youth activities moved online. Consultation began on 30 redundancies, but in 2020 the situations were secured by a £3 million grant from the UK Government's Culture Recovery Fund. Further funding to assist with lockdown included £326,000 in public donations; £49,500 from the Heritage Lottery Fund, and £15,000 from the Architectural Heritage Fund. The latter two grants supported the theatre's youth activities.

To give the impression of an audience whilst the auditorium was closed, Whitstable artist Ben Dickson created 50 portrait cut-outs of famous people associated with Kent and placed them in the empty seats. When shows restarted, those seats were required for real people. The two dimensional Marlowe Flatmates were evicted and sold to raise funds for the theatre.

== Building ==
The Marlowe's 1,200 seat auditorium has balconies, a flytower and orchestra pit. The complex also includes a separate 150 seat performance space; hospitality outlets; rehearsal and backstage facilities, and a three level foyer.

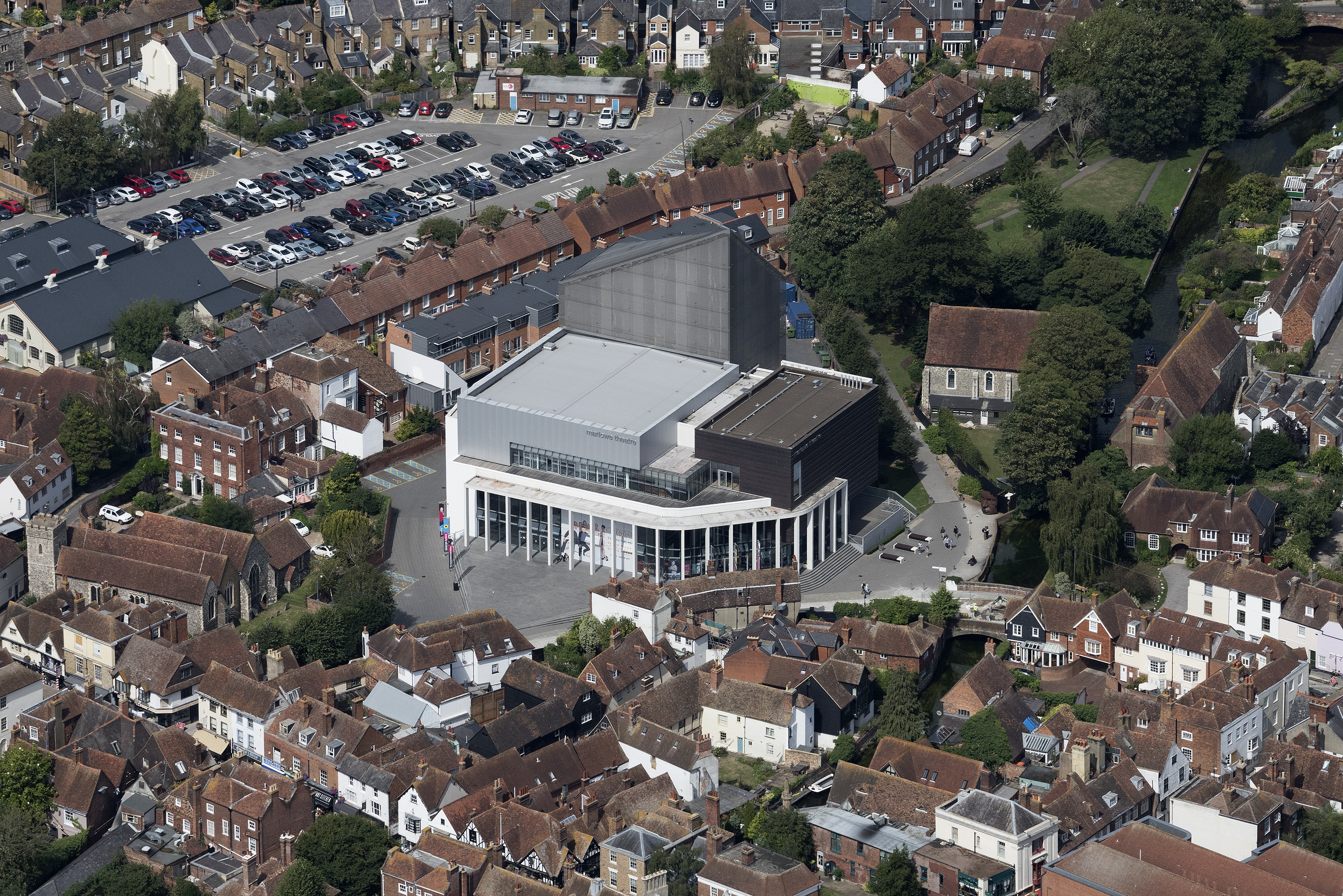
Marlowe Theatre, 2018

When built, the landmark, pointed flytower was the city centre's second tallest structure, after Canterbury Cathedral. It is faced in a stainless steel mesh in front of aluminium panels. The secondary chamber is raised above entrance level and differentiated by oxidised copper cladding.

The distinctive, colonnade facade comprises individual six tonne, polished, reconstituted stone columns, some incorporating concealed downpipes, and a precast concrete soffit.

== Activities ==
Regular visiting companies include Projekt Europa; Glyndebourne Opera; Matthew Bourne; The Philharmonia Orchestra, and The Royal Shakespeare Company.

The venue has hosted John Surman and his LP Morning Glory was recorded in the first theatre in 1973. Other performers have included Elvis Costello, Van Morrison, Ray Davies, Suzanne Vega, Kate Rusby, Richard Thompson, José González, Don McLean, and Fairport Convention.

In 2014, it was announced the Marlowe would become a producing house, focussed on new writing, supported by a £23,000 grant from Arts Council England.

=== The Marlowe Youth Theatre ===
The Marlowe runs theatre workshops for young people at a 12th century, former priests hospital in nearby Stour Street.

=== Pantomime ===
The Marlowe's pantomimes have featured Dave Lee, Natalie Imbruglia, Martine McCutcheon, Danniella Westbrook, Shaun Williamson, Daniel MacPherson, Lewis Collins, Emma Barton, Adrian Edmondson, John Thompson, John Partridge, Toyah Willcox, Samantha Womack, Rita Simons and Gareth Gates. The Marlowe's resident dame, Ben Roddy, has won the award for Best Dame at the Pantomime Awards twice, once in 2018 and again in 2024.

== Controversies ==
=== Marlowe Memorial ===
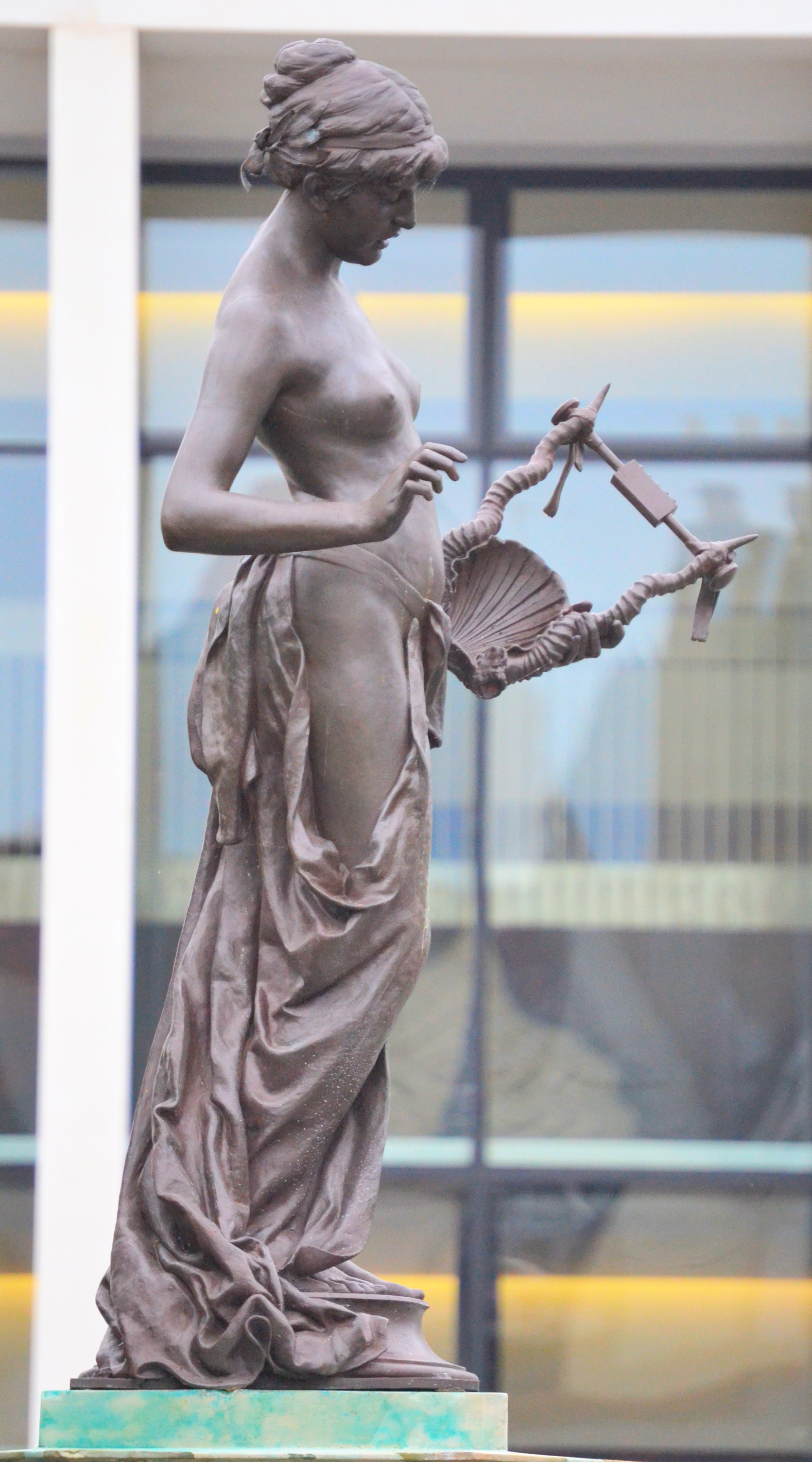
The Muse of Poetry outside the theatre.

The Muse of Poetry statue, representing Christopher Marlowe's work, in front of the theatre has been criticised as "Victorian soft porn". A Whitstable resident argued in 2022, the figure stands "unnecessarily naked, except for a titillatingly draped piece of cloth" and has "nothing specifically to do with Christopher Marlowe".

=== Motorbike accident ===
In 2019, a stunt motorbike rider was injured during a matinee show of pantomime Mother Goose. Two of three riders collided as they were spun around a metal cage. The victim was assisted at the scene by doctor, and fellow performer, Ranj Singh before spending 24 hours in hospital.

=== Jim Davidson ===
The Marlowe Theatre barred Jim Davidson's 2013 tour. Theatre Manager Mark Everett told the Kent Messenger "Jim Davidson believes that I don't like his material, which is true." The entertainer encouraged Canterbury residents to attend his show at Margate or Maidstone.

== Awards ==
=== Theatre ===
- UK Theatre Awards 2022, Workforce Award
- The Stage Awards 2022, UK Theatre of the Year
- UK Theatre Awards 2015, Most Welcoming Theatre in the South East
- UK Theatre Awards 2012, for Achievement in Marketing

=== Building ===
- Civic Trust Award, 2013
- RIBA Downland Award, 2012

=== Pantomime ===
- The Pantomime Awards 2022, Best Pantomime over 900 seats
