= Dave Lee (comedian) =

British comedian (1947–2012)

Dave Lee MBE
- Born: David Legge; 1947; Broadstairs, Kent, England
- Died: 16 January 2012 (aged 64)

Comedy career
- Years active: 1985–2011
- Medium: Pantomime, stand-up

David Legge MBE (1947 – 16 January 2012), known as Dave Lee, was a British comedian known for his work in pantomimes in Kent and his work on television. Lee also founded his own charity to help disadvantaged children.

== Life and career ==
Lee was born in Broadstairs. At the age of five he suffered a bout of tuberculosis and later on, Lee also suffered from a burst appendix, peritonitis, pleurisy, double pneumonia and had his tonsils and adenoids out. Subsequently, Lee was sent to a convalescent home in Margate and disliked the idea.

He began his career as a drummer at the Chartham Secondary Modern School at the age of 13. He worked as the warm-up act for Michael Parkinson, Michael Aspel and Jimmy Tarbuck. He also appeared on television on the shows The Generation Game, Celebrity Squares, Live from the Palladium (where he achieved his breakthrough role and saw him invited to appear on the following two series), TVS' Strawberry Blonde and had his own golfing series. Lee visited the Falkland Islands in 1988 to entertain troops and was selected to appear at a Royal Gala in 1989. He was also a non-executive director of Gillingham F.C., having been a fan of the club. He was nominated for the 1990 British Variety Award for Best Stand-Up Comic.

In 1994, Lee founded the Dave Lee Happy Holidays Charity. During his lifetime, it raised £2 million for many of Kent's sick, disabled and under-privileged children to enjoy holidays and outings with their families. In the 2003 New Year Honours, Lee was appointed a Member of the Order of the British Empire (MBE), for services to the community in Kent.

== Illness and death ==
On 9 November 2011, it was announced that Lee had pulled out of the pantomime for Cinderella due to his failing health days before the rehearsals began. In his absence Lee's role was rewritten and filled by Sion Tudor Owen.

On 10 January 2012, Canterbury City Council announced that Lee would be given the Freedom of the City. Lee died six days later of pancreatic cancer, age 64. He was married with children. His funeral was held at Canterbury Cathedral on 30 January 2012 with fellow comedians Jim Davidson, Richard Digance, and the Lord Mayor of Canterbury in attendance.

He received the Freedom of the City posthumously.

== Legacy ==
A bronze statue of Lee was unveiled outside the Marlowe Theatre in May 2014.
