= Ricemans =

Former department store in Kent

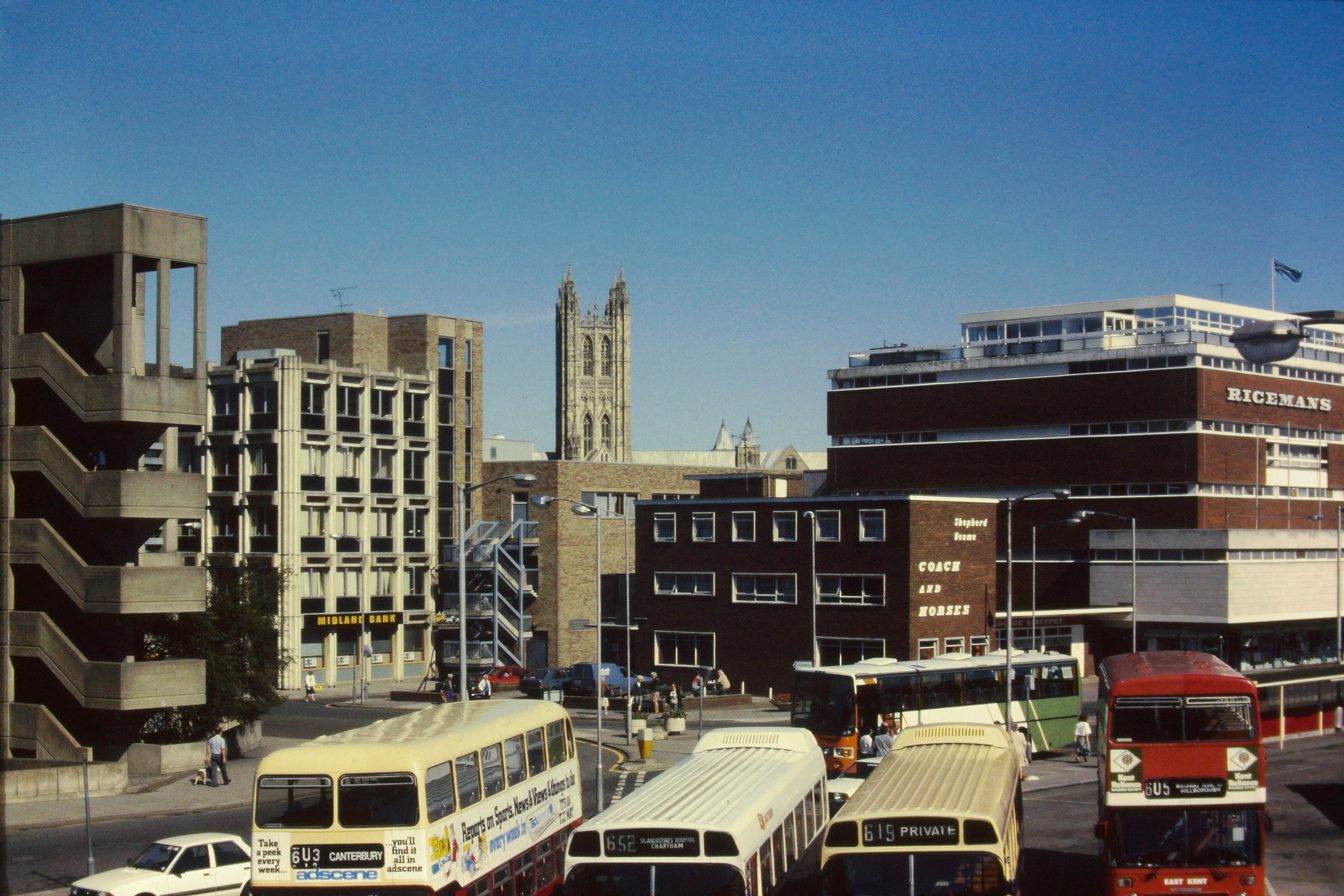
View of Canterbury, including Ricemans, taken in September 1987

Ricemans was a British department store based originally in Deal, Kent, before moving to the city of Canterbury in Kent. It later became part of the Fenwick group.

== History ==
Ricemans was established in the 1960s by Fred Riceman. Ricemans previously had traded in Deal, Kent, and had been in the town for some years. During a fire in October 1964 Ricemans Deal was burnt down and destroyed completely. Fred Riceman, who had bought this thriving department store, decided not to reopen the store in Deal and instead reopened a new department store in Canterbury.

Ricemans was adjoined to the Whitefriars shopping centre, peaked up to 7 floors in height and boasted the largest toy department in Canterbury. It was also one of the biggest department stores in Canterbury, which sold a variety of fashion accessories, shoes, clothes, toys, home and gardenware. Ricemans of Canterbury became part of the Fenwick Group in 1986.

In 2003, the Ricemans store was closed and demolished as part of a major redevelopment in the city and subsequent rebuilding of the Whitefriars Shopping Centre. Ricemans was replaced by a new Fenwick department store which had previously been its parent company.
