= Michael Ward (singer, born 1959) =

- Born: 1959 (age 66–67)
- Origin: Workington, Cumbria
- Instrument: Vocals
- Years active: 1973–date
- Label: Philips Records

Michael Ward (born 1959) is an English former child singing celebrity, winner of ITV's Opportunity Knocks, who had a hit single and album in the early seventies.

== Career ==
A pupil of Moorclose School in Warrington, Cumbria, boy soprano Ward was discovered in April 1973 at auditions for the Opportunity Knocks show, when he was 13 years old, He duly appeared on the show and was a winner in the audience vote seven times. In September 1973, during his winning run, his debut single, "Let There Be Peace On Earth (Let It Begin With Me)", backed by the Alyn Ainsworth Orchestra and the Mike Sammes Singers, was released. The single entered the UK singles chart at the end of the month, peaking inside the top 20 in late October and selling over 50,000 copies, earning him a place on Top of the Pops.

A debut album followed before the year's end, but after follow-ups failed to chart, Ward stepped back on his music career to focus on schoolwork.

Various comebacks after his voice broke did not lead to a recurrence of national success, but in the mid-1980s, on joining the actors' union Equity. he changed his name to Michael Sayzer (as there was already an actor of the same name registered with Equity), and carved out a career in cabaret.

== Discography (as Michael Ward) ==
=== Albums ===
Album and details	Peak positions
Album and details	UK
Introducing Michael Ward: Released: 1973; Record label: Philips	26
Michael Ward Sings: Released: 1974; Record label: Decca	–

=== Singles ===
Year	Single	Peak positions	Album
Year	Single	UK	Album
1973	"Let There Be Peace On Earth (Let It Begin With Me)"	15	Introducing Michael Ward
1974	"He"	–	Michael Ward Sings
