= British Forces Foundation =

The British Forces Foundation is a British charitable foundation, launched in May 1999 by comedian Jim Davidson OBE to support the well-being of the members of Britain's armed forces through the provision of high quality entertainment. The Prince of Wales is Patron, and former Prime Minister Baroness Thatcher was president.

The BFF stages morale-boosting shows for the forces at home, and in combat zones, and also stages frequent fund-raising events including an annual fund-raising Ball and auction.

Among the stars to have worked with the BFF are Katherine Jenkins OBE (a charity Trustee), James Blunt, Ed Sheeran, Jimmy Carr, John Bishop, and Pixie Lott.

== See also ==
- Services Sound and Vision Corporation
