= We Can Make It (Peters and Lee album) =

Studio album by Peters and Lee
- Released: 1973
- Label: Philips
- Producer: John Franz

Peters and Lee chronology
| We Can Make It (1973) | By Your Side (1973) |

We Can Make It is the debut album by British vocal duo Peters and Lee, the first of five charting albums they recorded. It spent two weeks at the top of the UK Albums Chart in 1973 and was awarded a gold disc. It is one of the very few number one albums not available on CD in the UK.

After a seven-week winning streak on Opportunity Knocks in February 1973, the biggest winners ever at that point on the show, Peters and Lee signed with Philips. The album was produced by John Franz, and the conductor was Peter Knight. This was the old Philips team that previously worked with Scott Walker and Dusty Springfield.

"All Change Places", "I'm Confessin'" and "Let It Be Me" were some of the winning songs from Opportunity Knocks. Their producer and Bryan Blackburn wrote "Turn to Me" as a new song, and the title track "We Can Make It" was also on the B-side of the Brotherhood of Man release "Happy Ever After".

Songs used to promote the LP were "I'm Confessin'" on the Mike and Bernie Winters and Rolf Harris shows; "Let It Be Me" on CILLA (sung with Cilla Black) and "Seaside Special"; "Welcome Home" on Top of the Pops; and "Crying in the rain" on "The Golden Shot".

== Track listing ==
1. "All Change Places" (John Garfield, David Gold)
2. "I'm Confessin'" (Doc Daugherty, Ellis Reynolds)
3. "Take to the Mountains" (Tony Hazzard)
4. "Turn to Me" (Bryan Blackburn, John Franz)
5. "There They Go" (Harold Dorman)
6. "We Can Make It" (Ivor Raymonde, Tony Hiller)
7. "Let It Be Me" (Gilbert Bécaud, Mann Curtis)
8. "Cryin' in the Rain" (Carole King, Howard Greenfield)
9. "Good Morning Freedom" (Roger Cook, Roger Greenaway, Albert Hammond, Michael Hazlewood)
10. "Cryin' Time" (Buck Owens)
11. "Never My Love" (Dick Addrisi, Don Addrisi)
12. "Welcome Home" (Bryan Blackburn, Jean Dupré, Stanislas Beldone)
