= Whitefriars Shopping Centre =

Coordinates: 51.277°N 1.080°E

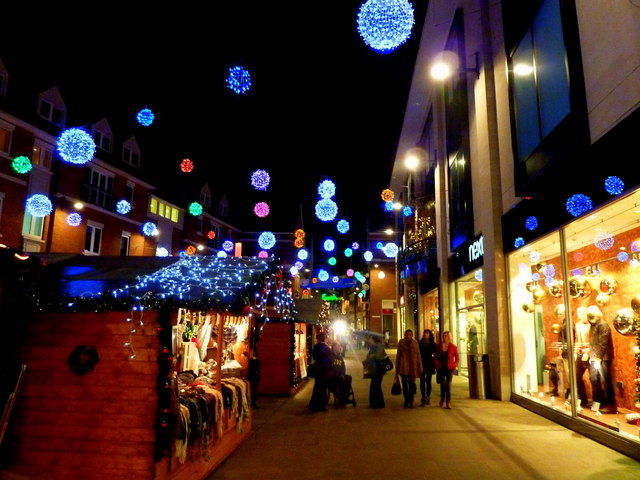
- Whitefriars, German Christmas Market, 2011
- Location: Canterbury, Kent
- Opened: 2005
- Developer: Land Securities
- Num. of stores: 70
- Num. of anchor tenants: 5
- Floors: 3
- Parking: 530 spaces
- Website: Official website

Whitefriars Shopping Centre is a shopping centre in Canterbury, Kent.

== History ==
The Whitefriars Shopping Quarter is situated on the site of a former multi-storey car park and the Ricemans department store. Following the demolition of these buildings a new multi storey carpark and a Fenwick department store were constructed.

An archaeological excavation was carried out on the site by Canterbury Archaeological Trust in advance of the development of the shopping centre. It was featured on Channel 4's television programme Time Team from 2000 to 2003, unearthing mostly Roman and Medieval finds.

The Marlowe Arcade is built on the site of a theatre that opened shortly before World War I. It was converted to the Central Picture Cinema in the 1920s and reopened as the first Marlowe Theatre in 1949, originally for amateur dramatics and then repertory. After financial difficulties in 1981, it was demolished in 1982.

== Whitefriars ==
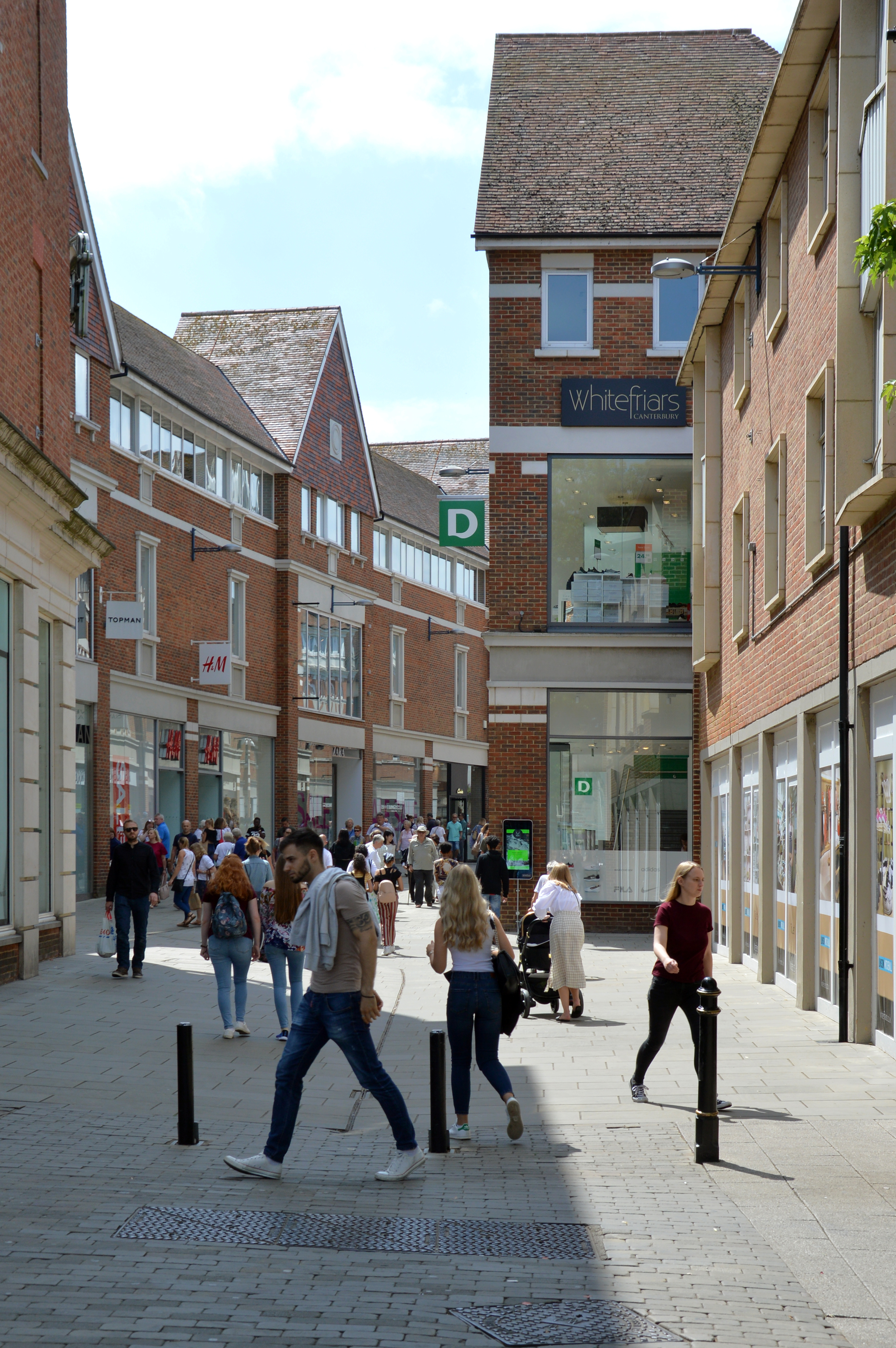
Whitefriars Street, one of streets around which the shops are structured.

The Whitefriars shopping centre is made up of shops mainly spread over two floors, but with some shops over three floors. The multi-storey car park is in the same block as Tesco, with two bridges between the carpark, Primark and Marks and Spencer. The layout of the centre consists mainly of squares, namely Rose Square, Clocktower Square and Whitefriars Square, small streets and arcade. An older part of the centre is part of the high street. The three floors are connected by two main lifts, in the stair room and Fenwicks. There are public toilets and facilities in Fenwick, Eat, Cafe Nero, Costa and Marks and Spencer.

Whitefriars Shopping Centre is adjacent to Canterbury Bus Station.

The Marlowe arcade is the only part of the centre with a full roof, and contains more specialised shops. In late 2012, it was announced that the arcade would be renamed 'Whitefriars Arcade', a move which has received criticism from some locals.
