= Brian Brendan Wright =

Irish criminal (born c.1947)

- Born: 1947 (age 78–79)
- Penalty: 30 years in prison

Brian Brendan Wright (born c. 1947) is an Irish criminal, who was raised in Kilburn, London, involved in race-fixing by doping more than 20 race horses in 1990, and trafficking tonnes of cocaine from the Medellín Cartel into Great Britain over a period of two years, amassing up to a £600 million fortune.

Originally based in Britain, Wright had been out of the country when authorities began arresting members of his organisation (including his own son, Brian Jr, and former son-in-law, Paul Shannon) as the result of a six-year investigation following the capture of a converted fishing trawler, the Sea Mist, after Irish customs officials discovered 599 kg of cocaine while docked at Cork, Ireland in September 1996.

After relocating to northern Cyprus, he purchased a £300,000 villa near Lapithos in the name of a Turkish Cypriot friend and, by 1998, his organization operated freely as the northern Cyprus government is recognized only by Turkey and thus has no extradition treaties with any other country.

In 2002, British authorities announced the capture of a leading member of his organisation, South African drug trafficker Hilton John Van Staden, who eventually pleaded guilty to conspiring to smuggle drugs into the country, with customs officials claiming the destruction of Wright's organisation.

In April 2005, he was arrested by police in Sotogrande, Spain.

On 2 April 2007, after an 11-year investigation, he was found guilty of running an international cocaine smuggling empire. The following day, he was sentenced to 30 years and, according to his lawyers, had accepted he will die in prison. Wright was a friend of celebrity comedian Jim Davidson, partly owning one of Davidson's horses.

In April 2020, after serving 15 years of his sentence, Wright was released. After his release, the British Horseracing Authority reaffirmed his lifetime ban from horse racing.
