= Deborah Corrigan =

Model

- Born: 15 July 1970 (age 56); Macclesfield, Cheshire, England
- Other name: Debbie Corrigan
- Occupation: Glamour model
- Height: 5 ft 8 in (1.73 m)

Deborah Corrigan (born 15 July 1970) is an English glamour model.

== Career ==
Corrigan began her career as a Page 3 girl. She was also well known for having a relationship with comedian Jim Davidson. She has had breast alteration surgery (firstly for larger breasts and then to have them reduced) and surgery on her lips (lip implants).

== Filmography ==
- The Curse of Page 3 (TV) Documentary 2003
- Playboy: Stripsearch UK, Naughty Housewives 1998
- Office Girls and Riding Mistresses 1998
- Page 3 Video: Cyber Sex 1996
- Mandy's Vibrating Toes/Cindy's Jelly Feet 1995
