= Marlowe Memorial =

Memorial in Canterbury, Kent, England

Marlowe Memorial – The Muse of Poetry
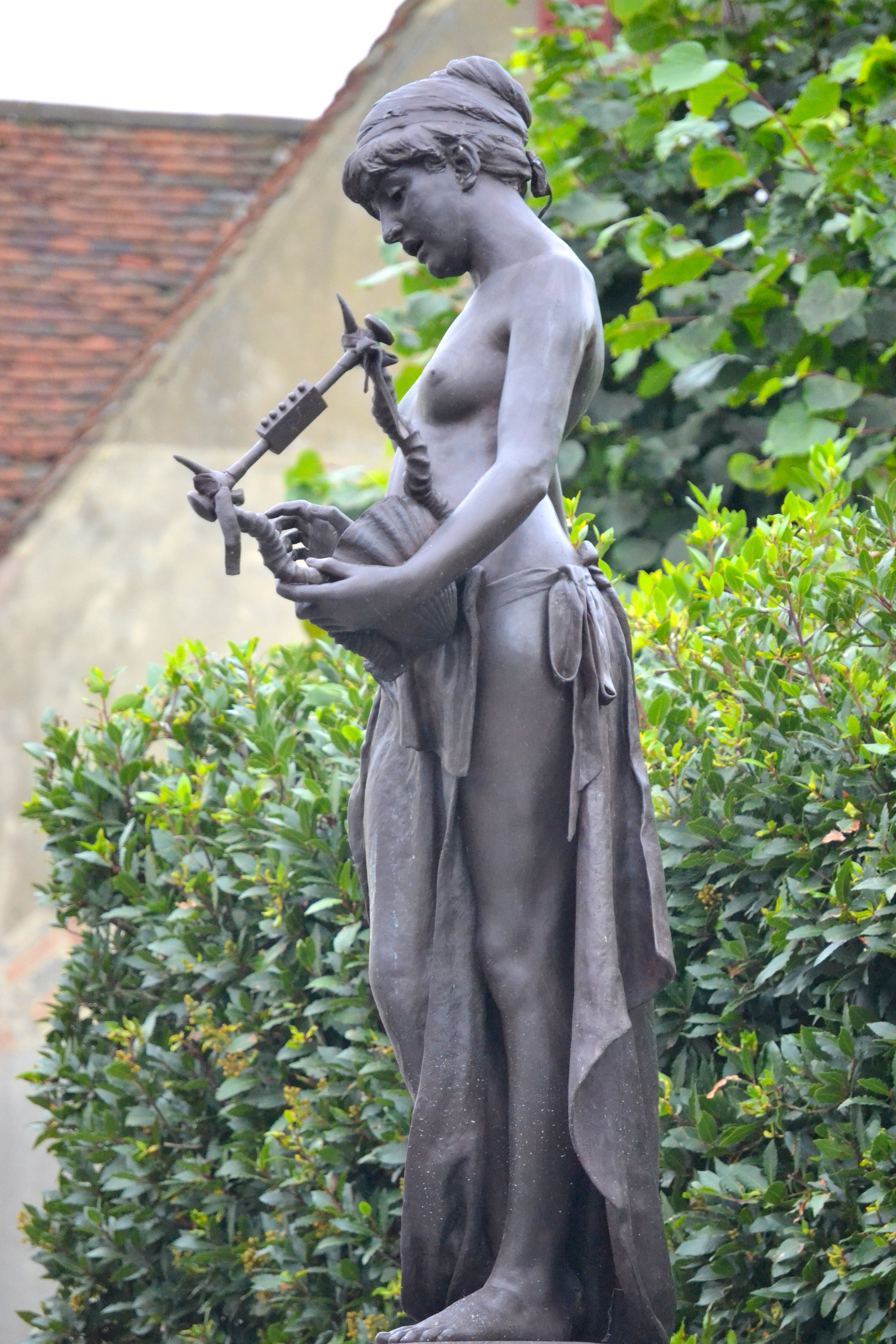
- Artist: Edward Onslow Ford
- Year: 1891
- Type: Bronze
- Location: Canterbury; 51°16′50″N 1°04′41″E

The Marlowe Memorial is a statue and four statuettes erected in memory of the playwright and poet Christopher Marlowe in 1891 in Canterbury, England. The memorial was commissioned by a Marlowe Memorial Committee, and comprises a bronze statue, The Muse of Poetry sculpted by Edward Onslow Ford, standing on a plinth decorated with statuettes of actors playing Marlowe roles. The statue is now situated outside the city's Marlowe Theatre.

== Memorial Committee ==
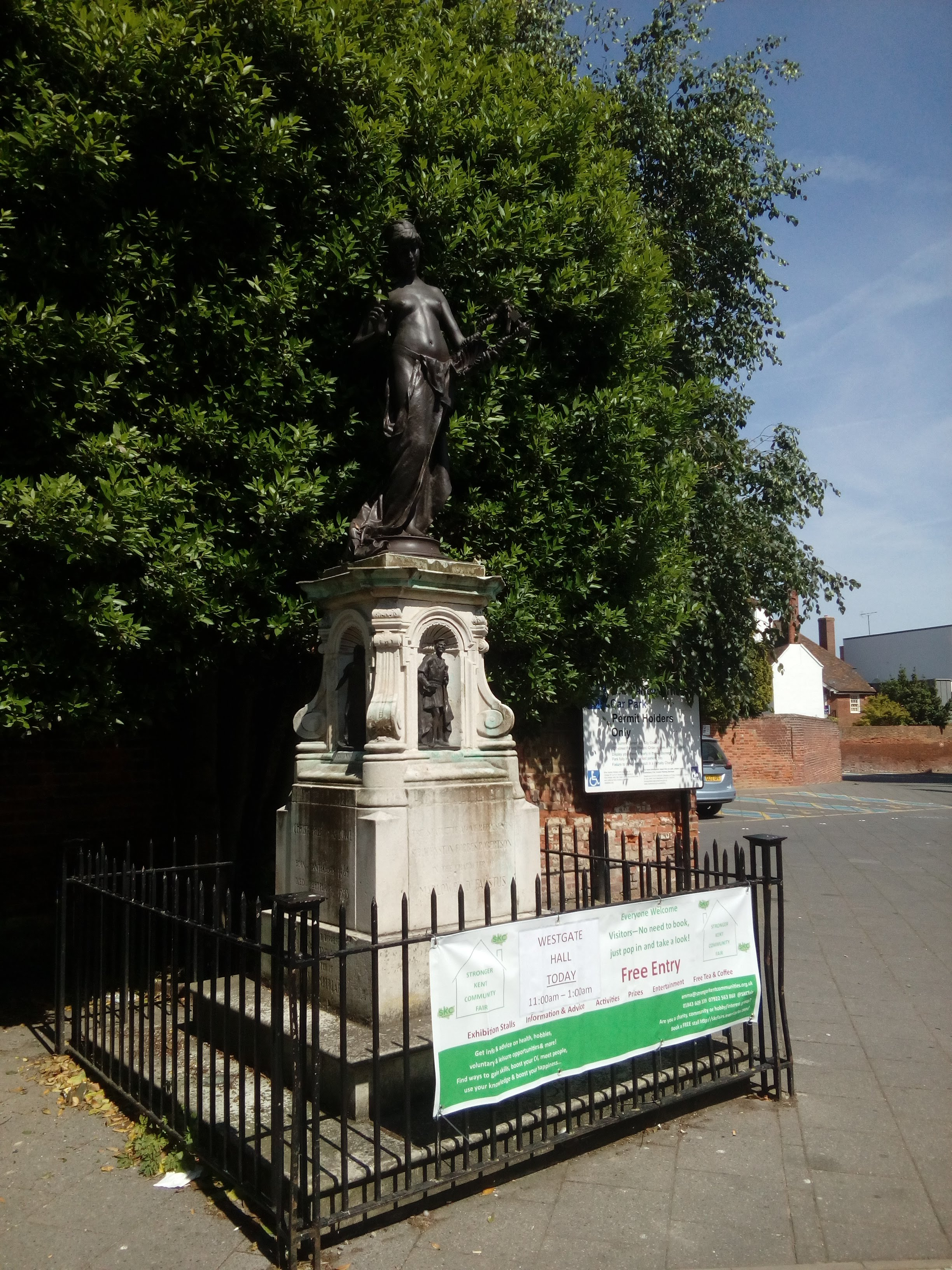
The Marlowe Memorial at its current location near the Marlowe Theatre

A Marlow Memorial Committee was established in 1888, arising out of a conception on the part of the Elizabethan Society of Toynbee Hall, that Marlowe, perhaps because of his reputation as an atheist, lacked the national recognition that he deserved. James Ernest Baker of the Society wrote to the London Evening Standard newspaper on 28 July 1888 to draw attention to Marlowe's work and legacy, stating that he had "laid the foundations of English blank verse, which, in its more developed form through the medium of Shakespeare and Milton, has become the life-blood of English literature and the supreme instrument of tragic poetry."

A committee was formed in reaction to the letter, numbering amongst its officers Sidney Lee and Frederick Rogers of the Society, the former acting as treasurer; Lord Coleridge, the Lord Chief Justice of England acting as chairman; and with members including poets Robert Browning, Alfred, Lord Tennyson, James Russell Lowell, Edmund Gosse, Algernon Charles Swinburne, John Addington Symonds, Andrew Lang, Alfred Austin and Henry Beeching; the publisher Arthur Henry Bullen, editor Alexander Balloch Grosart, actor-manager Henry Irving; writers & critics Leslie Stephen, Richard Garnett; and scholars Horace Howard Furness and Francis James Child. The committee raised funds by subscription, and held a public reading at St James's Hall involving Irving and Ellen Terry, which raised £100.

== Memorial ==
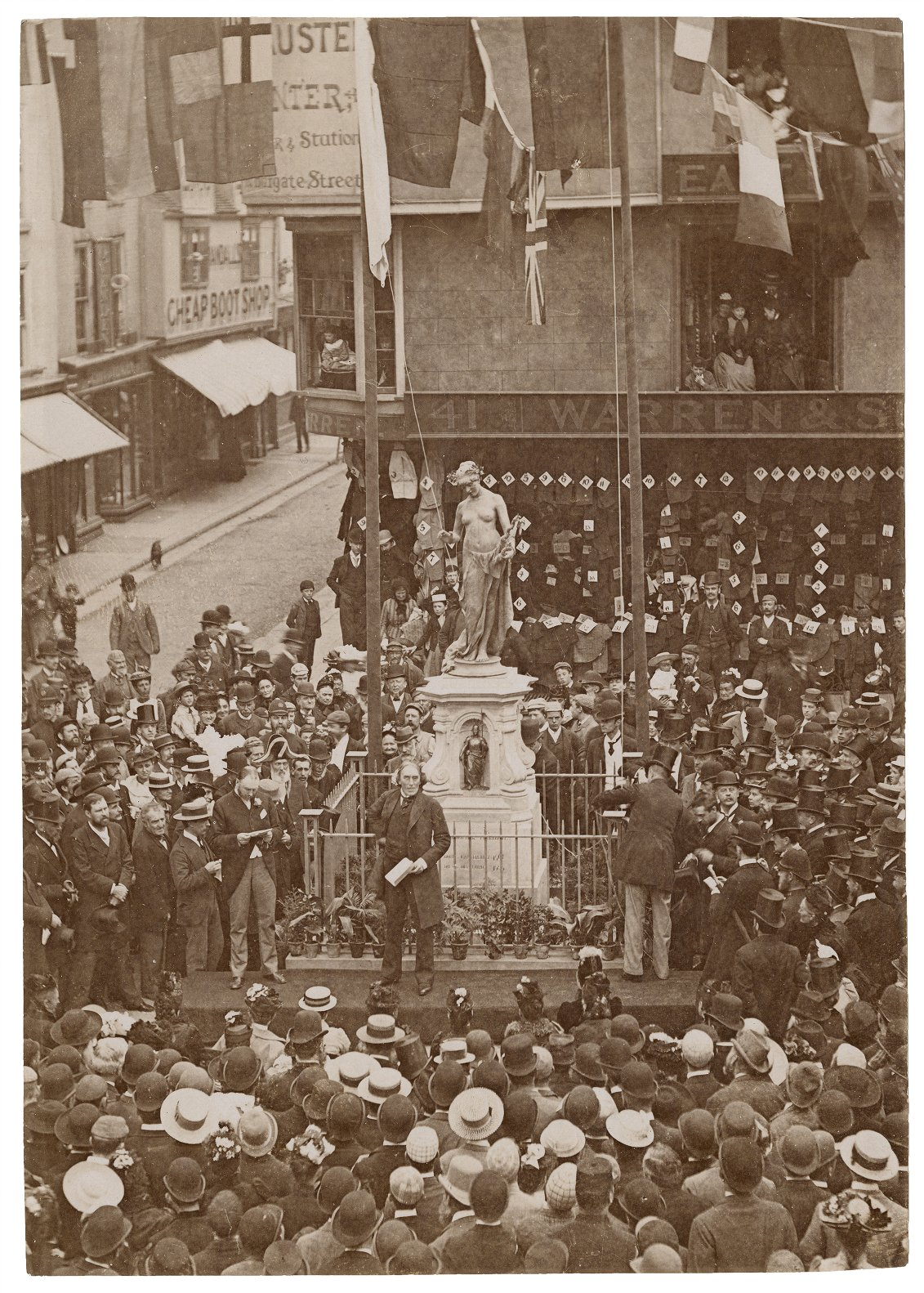
Henry Irving unveiling the memorial in Buttermarket in 1891

Victorian sculptor Edward Onslow Ford was commissioned to create the memorial; there being no surviving image of Marlowe known at the time, Ford decided on an allegorical representation in the form of The Muse of Poetry, a scantily-clad lyric muse surmounting a square pedestal having statuettes of four notable players of Marlowe characters in niches on each side. These were to be (according to Rogers) Irving as Tamburlaine, George Alexander as Faustus, Herbert Beerbohm Tree as Edward II, and W. S. Willard as The Jew of Malta.

Funds were insufficient to realise this plan, and the memorial, situated in the Buttermarket, was unveiled on 16 September 1891 by Irving, with his statuette as the sole plinth decoration. Rogers asserts that the Memorial awakened a new interest in Elizabethan literature, and quoting Gosse – "Marlowe had been successfully neglected for three-hundred years" noted that "he suddenly became the subject of leading articles in the chief newspapers and magazines, and of paragraphs and leaderettes in minor ones". Although the statue earned the nicknamed Kitty (the playwright was known as Kit), some objections were raised to the statue's dishabille, especially so near the Cathedral. Shrubbery, railings and four lanterns were erected around the statue in 1892.

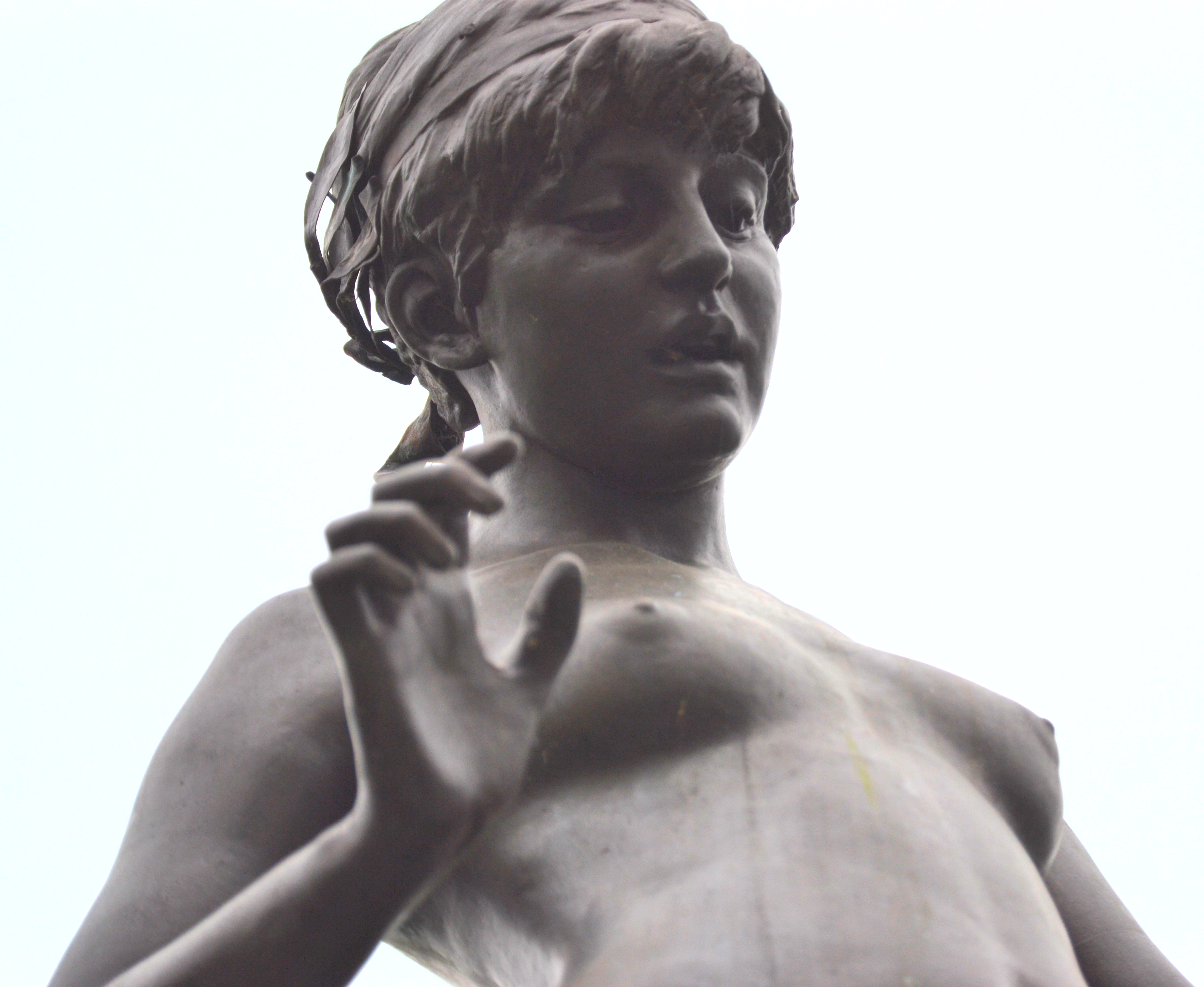
A close up of the memorial

Much later, additional funds were raised to complete the vision, and a second unveiling was conducted by the novelist Hugh Walpole, who had briefly attended Marlowe's alma mater, The King's School, Canterbury. A contemporary source lists the statuettes on the plinth as Irving (Tamburlaine), Sir Johnston Forbes-Roberston as Faustus, James Keteltas Hackett as Edward II, and Edward Alleyn as The Jew of Malta.

The statue has been resited on a number of occasions; first to King Street to make way for a World War I memorial; thence to Dane John Gardens in 1921. The memorial was damaged in a 1940 (or 1942) World War II bombing of the city, the muse being thrown to the ground. She was remounted, but facing in a new direction, an error corrected only in 1964. Two statuettes were stolen in 1977. Most recently the statue was again relocated to stand outside the Marlowe Theatre, Ian McKellen performing a rededication ceremony in 1993.
