= Peters and Lee =

British folk/pop duo

Background information
- Origin: United Kingdom
- Genres: Folk; pop
- Years active: 1970–1980, 1986, 1989, 1992
- Past members: Lennie Peters; Dianne Lee

Peters and Lee were a British folk and pop duo of the 1970s and 1980s, comprising Lennie Peters and Dianne Lee.

== Background ==
Lennie Peters was born Leonard Sargent Peters in 1931. He was blinded in both eyes in two occasions as a child; his left eye during a car accident when he was five years old, and a thrown brick blinded his other eye when he was sixteen. Before Peters and Lee, he was a pianist playing the London pub scene. He recorded two singles on the Oriole label, "Let the Tears Begin" and "And My Heart Cried" in 1963 and 1964 respectively. In 1966, he recorded "Stranger in Paradise" for Pye Records and then "Here We Go Again" on the Gemini label in 1970.

Peters teamed up with actress and dancer Dianne Lee in 1970. Lee would provide backing vocals for Peters' solo act. She was also at the time part of a dance act with her cousin Liz.

Their original act was called 'Lennie Peters and Melody' until their management International Artists suggested the name 'Peters and Lee'. Their first performance was with Rolf Harris on 30 April 1970 at a concert in Bournemouth.

== Early success ==
The duo entered the TV talent show Opportunity Knocks in February 1973, which they won seven times, a then-record and the second most for the show ever, with such songs as "All Change Places", "I'm Confessin'", "Let It Be Me" and "All I Ever Need is You". Following their TV success, a record contract was soon signed with Philips Records. They were produced by Philips' A&R man Johnny Franz, and their management company was International Artists, run by Phyllis Rounce and Laurie Mansfield. Franz found the song that suited them well, and their recording quickly led to a number one hit; "Welcome Home" sold over 800,000 copies in Britain.

A successful first album, We Can Make It, followed, which also reached the number one position, selling over 250,000 copies. Further single hits followed with "Don't Stay Away Too Long", which reached number three, "By Your Side" which reached number 39, "Rainbow" which reached number 17, "Closer" and "What is Love" at number 53 and "Hey Mr Music Man" at number 16. In the peak of their popularity they recorded two new songs for a movie called 11 Harrowhouse, Day after Day and Long live love.

== TV appearances ==
The duo were top of the bill at the Royal Variety Performance in 1973. They were also resident guest stars on The Des O'Connor Show had slots on The Golden Shot, Mike and Bernie Winters' Show, Presenting Nana Mouskouri, Seaside Special and David Nixon's show.

Peters and Lee had a popular (now lost) TV series of their own Meet Peters & Lee, though three episodes exist on audio as well as including several Christmas specials made by ATV. "The Peters and Lee Story" was one Christmas special made for 27 December 1975 which starred Mike and Bernie Winters, Cleo Laine and Aiden J Harvey, who won New Faces in 1974. A special Christmas radio show was produced for christmas day 1976 that exists as an audio. Their success made them household names and frequent appearances on Top of the Pops also kept their record sales steady.

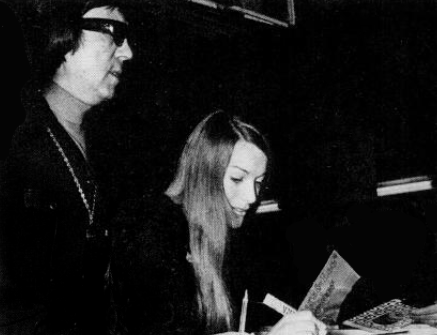
Peters and Lee sign autographs for America fans in 1975

After the "Smile" album and the three singles it spawned did not chart, Lennie and Di chose to split but still had many contracts to fulfill. So it took 2 years to fulfill all they needed to, so by 1980 they announced their farewell tour and LP. Their last television appearance before their split was London Night Out in November 1980, in which they performed four songs from their farewell album. And a radio spot on December 2 at 8pm BBC radio 2 "The last happy song". Their last regular concert.

== Solo and reunion ==
Lee went on to perform mainly in theatre and acting roles, Her first without Lennie was in Sleeping Beauty in Bournemouth, whilst Peters recorded his only solo album Unforgettable in 1981 and released three singles, "Record of My Love" in 1981, "Why Me" for Christmas 1982 and "Key Largo" in 1985. Peters also appeared on a few small television slots and appeared briefly as a crime boss in the 1984 film The Hit, but without a huge success. Despite their fame, neither Peters nor Lee could repeat the success they enjoyed whilst together.

The pair reunited in 1986 with a new single, "Familiar Feelings", to perform on the nostalgia circuit. The single was promoted on Live from the Piccadilly and The Grumbleweeds Show. The duo went on to record two new albums also, one in 1989 simply called Peters and Lee and the last in 1992 for their 21st anniversary, before Peters' death from bone cancer that same year, aged 60. Their final television appearance was Pebble Mill in February 1992 with a short interview and a performance of the hit "Hey Mister Music Man". Sporting a broken arm, Peters' illness was apparent. Lee went on to marry Rick Price of Wizzard and recorded a solo album Chemistry in 1994.

== Discography ==
- We Can Make It (1973)
- By Your Side (1973)
- Rainbow (1974)
- Favourites (1975)
- Serenade (1976)
- Invitation (1976)
- Smile (1977)
- Love and Affection (1979)
- The Farewell Album (1980)
- Peters & Lee (1989)
- Through All the Years (1992)
