= Up the Elephant and Round the Castle =

British TV sitcom (ITV 1983–85)

- Genre: Comedy
- Written by: Colin Bostock-Smith; Jim Eldridge; Tony Hoare; Spike Mullins
- Directed by: Anthony Parker
- Starring: Jim Davidson; John Bardon; Sue Nicholls; Nicholas Day; Brian Hall; Brian Capron; Anita Dobson; Sara Corper; Rosalind Knight
- Theme music composer: Keith Emerson
- Country of origin: United Kingdom
- Original language: English
- No. of series: 3
- No. of episodes: 22

Production
- Producer: Anthony Parker
- Running time: 30 minutes
- Production company: Thames Television

Original release
- Network: ITV
- Release: 30 November 1983 – 7 November 1985

Up the Elephant and Round the Castle is a British television sitcom, which aired from 30 November 1983 to 7 November 1985, and was produced by Thames Television for the ITV network. Starring comedian Jim Davidson, who played the role of Jim London, the show spawned a sequel, Home James!, which was also made by Thames. Home James! ran from 1987 to 1990.

== Plot ==
Jim London is a young lovable rogue who becomes a man of property when a relative dies, leaving him a run-down Victorian property at 17 Railway Terrace in the Elephant and Castle area of south London. He gets into various problems with the police and spends most of his time getting drunk and chasing women.

== Cast ==
- Jim Davidson as Jim London
- John Bardon as Ernie London
- Sue Nicholls as Wanda Pickles
- Nicholas Day as Arnold Moggs
- Brian Hall as Brian
- Brian Capron as Tosh Carey
- Anita Dobson as Lois Tight
- Sara Corper as Vera Spiggot
- Rosalind Knight as Jim's mum

== Production ==
The sitcom's theme tune was composed by Keith Emerson. The full length version can be heard on two of his albums, Hammer It Out and Off the Shelf.

== Series overview ==
Series	Episodes	Originally released	
Series	Episodes	First released	Last released
1	6	30 November 1983	11 January 1984
2	8	8 January 1985	26 February 1985
3	8	12 September 1985	7 November 1985

== Episodes ==
=== Series 1 (1983–84) ===
No. overall	No. in series	Title	Directed by	Written by	Original release date
1	1	"A Cuckoo in the Nest"	Anthony Parker	Spike Mullins	30 November 1983
2	2	"May the Best Man Win"	Anthony Parker	Jim Eldridge	7 December 1983
Jim's friend Arnold (Christopher Ellison) is marrying Cheryl (Linda Robson) and Jim has agreed to be best man even though Arnold never returned some money he borrowed back in 1974. Arnold has asked Jim to calm Cheryl's parents down as they're 'going through a sticky patch' and Jim panics as they are two wrestlers (Jaw Breaker Hawkins and Edna the Human Mangle). When they arrive Jim hides in the kitchen as his talking only makes them more aggressive. Jim then has two problems, one is the parents wrestling each other and the other is Arnold on the verge of missing his own wedding
3	3	"...Up the Public Spirit"	Anthony Parker	Geoff McQueen	14 December 1983
Whilst making regular visits to the DHSS (late ones at that), Jim has been doing some odd jobs for friend Lois. He lands himself in trouble, but manages to get one up on Councillor Allnut thanks to a dodgy ladder.
4	4	"Never On A Sunday"	Anthony Parker	Peter Learmouth	21 December 1983
Jim's hopes of a quiet lie in on Sunday morning are dashed thanks to visits from his dad, Wanda and even the Salvation Army!
5	5	"A Bird in the Hand is Worth Two in Shepherds Bush"	Anthony Parker	Colin Bostock-Smith	4 January 1984
It's good neighbour week and Jim offers to look after Wanda's bird while she goes to hospital. Problems are caused when Jim's Dad gives the bird to Jim's Mum as a birthday present
6	6	"Every Two Minutes"	Anthony Parker	Tony Hoare	11 January 1984
Jim wakes up after a party and finds a woman sleeping in his bath and a bloke with a bag of stuff in his living room. Tosh eventually arrives as Jim tries to piece together the events of the party.

=== Series 2 (1985) ===
No. overall	No. in series	Title	Directed by	Written by	Original release date
7	1	"The Taste of Money"	Anthony Parker	Spike Mullins	8 January 1985
Jim wakes up next to a stuffed dog which he later discovers has been stolen from British Rail and a £2000 reward is offered for the return of the dog and conviction of the criminals.
8	2	"Wakey Wakey"	Anthony Parker	Geoff McQueen	15 January 1985
Jim allows two Irish friends to stay in his house and they take a coffin with them, meanwhile Jim hopes to take the wife of a jealous criminal on holiday, however they cannot go as the husband finds out and attempts to catch Jim.
9	3	"Friday the 13th"	Anthony Parker	Spike Mullins	22 January 1985
Jim begins to believe the superstition of Friday the 13th when the DHSS tell him he is to work as a sewer worker in Scotland
10	4	"Come to the Aid of the Party" (Note: On the DVD menu this episode is incorrectly titled "Come to the End of the Party")	Anthony Parker	Louise Ford	28 January 1985
Wanda wants to hold a Lingerie party in Jim's house, so Jim must stay out of the house for the day, but he does return to the house with his dad; they find Jim's mother is attending the party.
11	5	"And They Came Unto Jim"	Anthony Parker	Spike Mullins	5 February 1985
Two children, who have already stolen a wealthy man's coat, burgle Jim's house, when Jim catches them they tell him about the coat and Jim is able to change the children's view. Jim persuades the children to give back the coat inviting the wealthy man round; they say they found it on a bus and Jim says as they stole it they cannot accept any reward offered.
12	6	"The Road to Milton Keynes"	Anthony Parker	Spike Mullins	12 February 1985
13	7	"Charity Begins"	Anthony Parker	Spike Mullins	19 February 1985
When an attractive social worker turns up on his doorstep Jim takes a keen interest in charity.
14	8	"The Hostage"	Anthony Parker	Jim Eldridge	26 February 1985
Jim, his father, Arnold Moggs and a lady offering policies are held hostage in Jim's house by a robber with a gun, but he is not very good as his past attempts of robbery have been foiled by ordinary members of the public.

=== Series 3 (1985) ===
This series saw a change in the title sequences. The "Morning world..." monologues by Jim have been removed, and the opening video is the video of the closing titles for the previous two series; the closing titles for this series is the opening titles in reverse so instead of zooming into Jim, the camera zooms out.

No. overall	No. in series	Title	Directed by	Written by	Original release date
15	1	"One in the Rough"	Anthony Parker	Geoff McQueen	12 September 1985
To impress his girlfriend Fiona Jim learns to play Golf so he can play it with her dad. Brian lends Jim his friend's clubs and says his friend is very fond of the clubs. While practising at home (with an invisible ball) Jim's dad turns up, gives some advice and has a little practice. At the club Fiona's friend, knowing Jim doesn't know what a handicap is, tells Jim to say he is a scratch golfer when Fiona's dad asks. On the green Fiona's dad is paired with Jim and goes mad when he discovers how badly Jim actually plays. Jim is lucky enough to avoid injury and laughs with Brian at the pub at the incident. Finally Brian's friend turns up for the clubs to find a noticeable difference.
16	2	"Goodbye Mr. Wilkins" (Note: On the DVD menu this episode is incorrectly titled "Goodbye Wilkins")	Anthony Parker	Spike Mullins	19 September 1985
When two military police come calling, Jim sees the perfect way to evict his squatter.
17	3	"The Scotch Connection"	Anthony Parker	Spike Mullins	26 September 1985
18	4	"Rakingshores and Doodlebugs"	Anthony Parker	Geoff McQueen	10 October 1985
19	5	"A Taxing Problem" (Note: On the DVD menu this episode is incorrectly titled "A Taxing Term")	Anthony Parker	Jim Eldridge	17 October 1985
20	6	"Wide Eyed and Legless"	Anthony Parker	Geoff McQueen	24 October 1985
Jim is rudely awoken with a hangover by councillor Moggs, who comes round to complain about the noise of a party Jim was holding the previous night, he's also angry at the fact one of the guests bared their bottom at him. Wanda pops round and she discovers a false leg in Jim's bed, which the two realise belongs to Fred Burrows and Wanda helped him remove it and use it as a yard of ale glass. Jim carries the leg with him in a sack to the pub where Brian is feeling the effects of his drinking at the party. He then goes for a job interview, and another person guesses what sort of leg it is, but gives in to curiosity and looks in the sack. At the pub Councillor Moggs arrives to find Jim and Miss Hockwhistle (a fellow councillor) there, he then demands to know who the culprit was, only to discover it was the drunk Miss Hockwhistle.
21	7	"The Spy Who Left Me"	Anthony Parker	Spike Mullins	31 October 1985
22	8	"The Pied Piper of Hamlet"	Anthony Parker	Spike Mullins	7 November 1985

== Home releases ==
Series one was released on DVD in September 2007. The complete series was released on 5 May 2008 and was later re-released by Network on 3 October 2016.
