= The Hit (1984 film) =

1984 British film by Stephen Frears

- Theatrical release poster
- Directed by: Stephen Frears
- Written by: Peter Prince
- Produced by: Jeremy Thomas
- Starring: John Hurt; Tim Roth; Laura del Sol; Terence Stamp
- Cinematography: Mike Molloy
- Edited by: Mick Audsley
- Music by: Paco de Lucía; Title theme: Roger Waters; Eric Clapton
- Production companies: Recorded Picture Company; Zenith Productions; Central Productions
- Distributed by: Palace Pictures
- Release dates: 12 September 1984 (Toronto); 8 March 1985 (United States)
- Running time: 98 minutes
- Country: United Kingdom
- Languages: English; Spanish
- Box office: $876,775

The Hit is a 1984 British road crime film directed by Stephen Frears, and starring John Hurt, Terence Stamp, Laura del Sol, and Tim Roth in his film debut. It was Stamp's first starring role in over a decade, and Roth won an Evening Standard Award for Most Promising Newcomer. The title music is provided by Eric Clapton and Roger Waters. Spanish flamenco guitarist Paco de Lucia performed the soundtrack music. The film was released by The Criterion Collection on DVD in April 2009 and on Blu-ray in October 2020.

== Plot ==
London gangster Willie Parker gives evidence against his fellow criminals in return for a very generous offer from the police. As he is led from the witness box at his trial, the defendants threateningly sing Vera Lynn's song "We'll Meet Again."

Ten years later, Parker lives in comfortable retirement in Spain. Four Spanish youths kidnap and deliver him to British hit man Braddock and his young sidekick, Myron, hired by the crime boss that Parker helped put away. In the course of the kidnapping, the youths run down a local policeman assigned to guard Parker. Three of the youths are killed by a bomb in a briefcase handed to them by Braddock, which they believe contains their payment. Braddock is a world-weary professional killer while Myron is his perky but volatile apprentice. Parker adopts a carefree demeanour, explaining that he's had ten years to accept death as a simple part of life.

Braddock orders Myron to drive them to an apartment in Madrid whose owner is away. When they walk into the apartment, however, they find the place occupied by an acquaintance of the owner. The occupant is Harry, a middle-aged Australian with a young, apparently non-English-speaking Spanish girlfriend named Maggie, who comes home as they are talking. Parker mischievously announces his identity to them, causing Braddock to take Maggie with them as insurance. Harry gives the group the keys to the owner's white Mercedes. As they are about to leave, Parker makes a comment that causes Braddock to doubt that Harry will keep quiet, prompting him to go back up to the apartment and kill him.

The group head toward the French border, intending to reach Paris, where the crime boss is apparently awaiting their arrival. All the while, Parker sows seeds of discord between Braddock and Myron. Unbeknownst to the party, the Spanish police, led by a senior inspector, have begun following the trail of bodies. Stopping at a roadside bar to buy beer, Myron attacks four youths for laughing at him. Myron has developed sympathy for Maggie and feels protective of her. Meanwhile, Braddock has a confrontation with Maggie in which she reveals she understands English and bites his hand, drawing blood, from which he appears to derive some form of masochistic pleasure.

Braddock drives up a track leading to woodland next to a river, where the group can rest up. Leaving Myron with Parker, he takes Maggie with him to get petrol for the car. Maggie tries to alert the station attendant to her plight, forcing Braddock to kill the young man. Braddock chases after Maggie but is unable or unwilling to shoot her. They return to find Myron has fallen asleep and allowed Parker to slip away. Braddock finds him gazing at a waterfall. Parker tells him he's not afraid of death, which is merely just a stage in the journey of life.

The next day, Braddock stops the car at an isolated hillside ten miles from the border and announces that he has scrapped the plans to go to Paris. He relieves Myron of his gun and flings it into the scrub. Suddenly afraid, Parker insists that he cannot die until he gets to Paris. Braddock shoots him in the back as he flees. He then turns the pistol on Myron and kills him. Maggie surprises him and they wrestle violently. During the struggle, Braddock fires the last shot into the air and knocks Maggie unconscious. He leaves her alive and drives to a secluded spot where he changes into hiking clothes and walks off through the forest.

The police find Maggie and the two bodies. As Braddock attempts to cross the border on foot, Maggie identifies him to the police, who shoot him as he tries to escape. The police attempt to question the dying Braddock, but he only winks at Maggie.

== Cast ==
- Terence Stamp as Willie Parker
- John Hurt as Mitchell Braddock
- Tim Roth as Myron
- Laura del Sol as Maggie
- Bill Hunter as Harry
- Fernando Rey as Senior Policeman
- Lennie Peters as Mr Corrigan
- Willoughby Gray as Judge
- Jim Broadbent as Barrister

== Reception ==
At review aggregator Rotten Tomatoes, the film has an overall approval rating of 89% from 18 reviews, with an average rating of 8.1/10. On Metacritic, The Hit has a rank of 75 out of a 100 based on nine critics.

Vincent Canby of The New York Times wrote about the actors: "These guys don't have to use guns. All they have to do is open their mouths and bore each other to death".

Director Wes Anderson ranked it the fifth best British film.

Terence Stamp enjoyed working with Bill Hunter so much he later recommended Hunter as his love interest in The Adventures of Priscilla Queen of the Desert (1994).
