= Home James! =

British television sitcom series

- Genre: Comedy
- Written by: Geoff McQueen, Chris Boucher, Christopher Russell, David Lloyd, Simon Moss, David Firth, Spike Mullins and John Merryfield.
- Directed by: Mark Stuart Series 1. Episode 1. Anthony Parker Series 1 and 2. David Askey Series 3. Martin Shardlow Series 4.
- Starring: Jim Davidson; George Sewell; Harry Towb; Vanessa Knox-Mawer; Sherrie Hewson
- Country of origin: United Kingdom
- Original language: English
- No. of series: 4
- No. of episodes: 25

Production
- Producers: Anthony Parker Series 1 and 2. David Askey Series 3. Martin Shardlow Series 4.
- Production locations: London, England, UK
- Running time: 30 minutes
- Production company: Thames Television

Original release
- Network: ITV
- Release: 1 July 1987 – 23 July 1990

Home James! is a British television sitcom which aired for four series between 1 July 1987 and 23 July 1990, starring comedian Jim Davidson, who played the role of Jim London. The show was a sequel to the sitcom, Up the Elephant and Round the Castle. The show was made for the ITV network by Thames Television.

== Plot ==
Jim London (Jim Davidson) is a working class cockney lad who lands a job as a chauffeur for businessman Robert Palmer (George Sewell) who has had his driving licence withdrawn. Palmer's butler (Harry Towb) does not approve of Jim but gradually accepts him.

== Cast ==
Character	Actor
Jim London	Jim Davidson
Robert Palmer	George Sewell
Henry Compton	Harry Towb
Sarah Palmer	Vanessa Knox-Mawer
Terry	Owen Whittaker
Connie	Cecilia-Marie Carreon

== Episodes ==
25 episodes were aired over 4 series.

=== Series 1 (1987) ===
No. overall	No. in series	Title	Original release date
1	1	"Thinkin' on Your Feet"	1 July 1987
2	2	"You Can't Win 'em All"	8 July 1987
3	3	"Out of Bounds"	15 July 1987
4	4	"When Duty Calls"	22 July 1987
5	5	"Things That Go Spoof in the Night"	29 July 1987
6	6	"C'mon in Rubber Duck"	5 August 1987

=== Christmas Special (1987) ===
No. overall	No. in series	Title	Original release date
7	1	"It All Comes Out in the Wash"	21 December 1987

=== Series 2 (1988) ===
No. overall	No. in series	Title	Original release date
8	1	"Anyone For Tennis?"	7 September 1988
9	2	"A Sheep’s Eye for an Eye"	14 September 1988
10	3	"It Takes a Married Man"	21 September 1988
11	4	"Here’s a Switch, There’s a Switch"	28 September 1988
12	5	"Double Yolker"	5 October 1988
13	6	"First Impressions"	12 October 1988

=== Series 3 (1989) ===
No. overall	No. in series	Title	Original release date
14	1	"Everything in Its Place"	25 September 1989
15	2	"Walking the Dog"	2 October 1989
16	3	"Rent-a-Butler"	9 October 1989
17	4	"The Long and Winding Firm"	16 October 1989
18	5	"Con an’ Chips"	23 October 1989
19	6	"A Case of Mistaken Identity"	30 October 1989

=== Series 4 (1990) ===
No. overall	No. in series	Title	Original release date
20	1	"Sweet P.A."	18 June 1990
21	2	"French Kiss"	25 June 1990
22	3	"Charity Begins at Home"	2 July 1990
23	4	"Never Say Die"	9 July 1990
24	5	"Auntie"	16 July 1990
25	6	"Hooray Henry"	23 July 1990

== Home media ==
To this date, the series was not yet released on DVD or VHS.
