= Meet Peters & Lee =

Meet Peters & Lee is a British television series aired in April-May 1976. It was produced by Associated Television (ATV) and aired on ITV. All six programmes are believed to have been destroyed. An ongoing gag was Charlie Drake getting the names wrong of Peters and Lee. Episodes were one where Di lost her voice or there was a mouse in their piano. It was written by Bryan Blackburn who wrote their hit songs. Songs performed were "Don't Blame Me", "Serenade That We Played", "Mayday", "Remembering" and "Don't Stay Away Too Long" and while the series is lost, three episodes exist as audio only. The Christmas edition transmitted in 1974 was also wiped. As well as a second Christmas edition "The Peters and Lee Story" though this exists as a VHS recording.
