= Welcome Home (Peters and Lee song) =

Single by Peters and Lee
- B-side: "Can't Keep My Mind on the Game"
- Released: 1973
- Length: 3:31
- Label: Philips
- Songwriters: Jean Alphonse Dupre, Stanislas Beldone (trans. Bryan Blackburn)
- Producer: Johnny Franz

Official audio
- "Welcome Home" on YouTube

"Welcome Home" is a song made popular by Peters and Lee, which became a UK No. 1 in July 1973.

== Background ==
Originally written in French by Jean Alphonse Dupre and Stanislas Beldone and translated into English by Bryan Blackburn, the record was produced by Johnny Franz. Coming after their success in the talent show Opportunity Knocks, Peters and Lee recorded "Welcome Home", which became the duo's only No. 1 single on the UK Singles Chart, spending a week at the top in July 1973. It went on to sell over 800,000 copies in the UK. The B-side was "Can't Keep My Mind on the Game", written by Mitch Murray and Peter Callander and produced by Laurie Mansfield.

The song received minor US crossover, appearing on Billboard's Bubbling Under Hot 100, the Country chart, and most notably on the Easy Listening chart, where it peaked at No. 26.

== Charts ==
Chart (1973)	Peak position
Australia (Kent Music Report)	12
Canada Top Singles (RPM)	87
New Zealand (NZ listener chart)	7
United Kingdom (Official Charts Company)	1
US Billboard Hot Top 100	119
US Hot Country Songs (Billboard)	79
US Billboard Easy Listening	26

== In popular culture ==
- The song was used in an advertising campaign by Walkers Crisps when Gary Lineker returned to the UK after playing abroad.
