= Jim Davidson =

English comedian and television host (born 1953)

Jim Davidson OBE
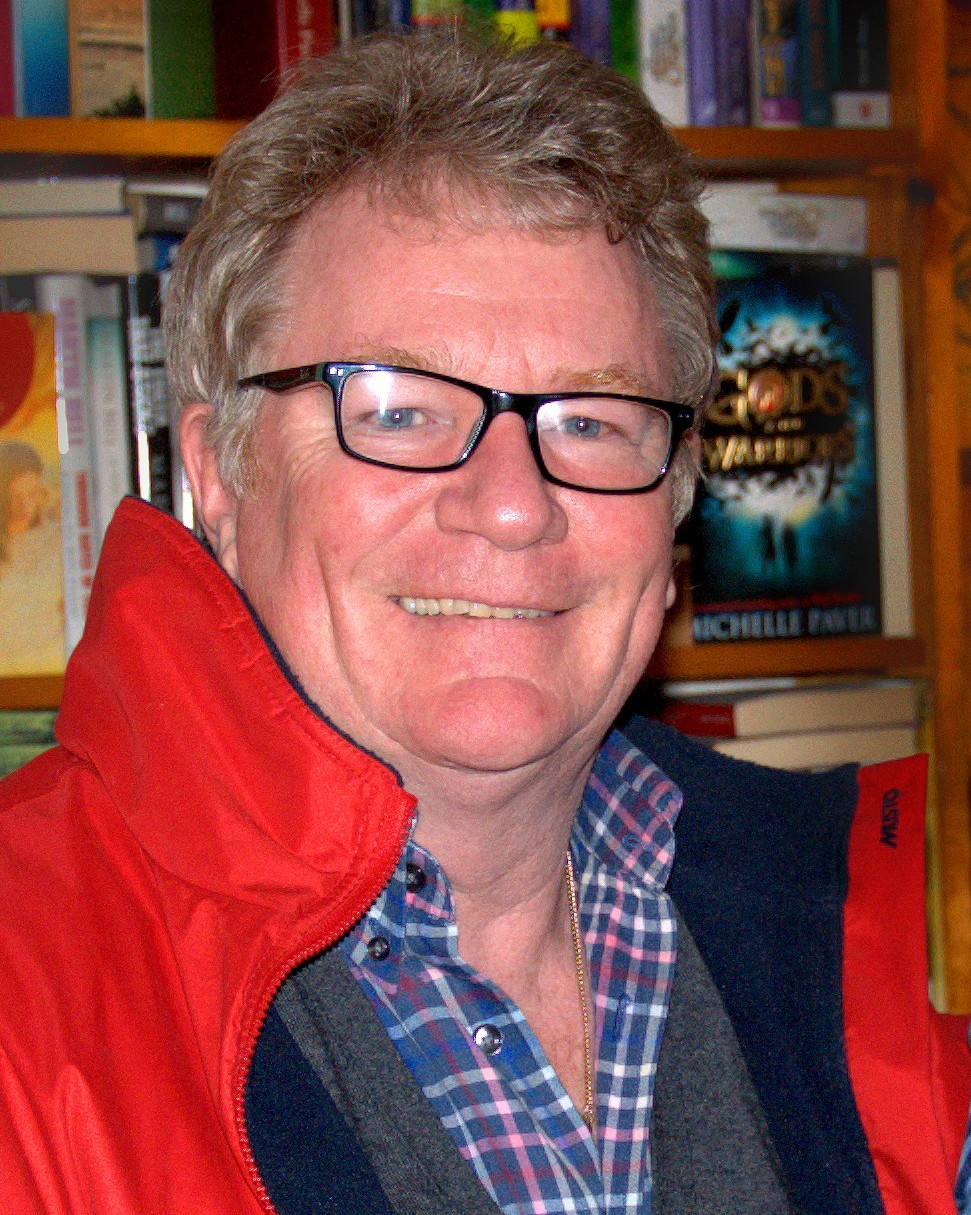
- Davidson in February 2014
- Born: James Cameron Davidson; 13 December 1953 (age 72); Kidbrooke, London, England
- Occupations: Comedian; actor; singer; TV presenter
- Spouses: Sue Walpole (m. 1971; div. 1972); Julie Gullick (m. 1981; div. 1986); Alison Holloway (m. 1987; div. 1988); Tracy Hilton (m. 1990; div. 2000); Michelle Cotton (m. 2009; div. 2023)
- Partner(s): Natasha (fiancée, 2025–2026)
- Children: 5

Comedy career
- Years active: 1974–present
- Medium: Stand-up, television, film
- Genres: Black comedy, blue comedy, insult comedy

James Cameron Davidson (born 13 December 1953) is an English stand-up comedian, actor, singer and TV presenter. He presented the TV shows Big Break and The Generation Game, and developed and starred in the adult pantomime shows Sinderella and Boobs in the Wood. In 2014 he was the winner of the 13th series of Celebrity Big Brother.

Davidson has incorporated jokes about various minority groups in his stand-up act, which has made him a subject of criticism. He has been involved in several public controversies due to his style of humour.

== Biography ==
The son of a Scottish father from Glasgow and an Irish mother from County Cork, Davidson was born in Kidbrooke, London, and attended Kidbrooke Park Primary School, Blackheath, and St Austin's School in Charlton. Having impressed some acquaintances of his father with impressions of celebrities, he was chosen to appear in Ralph Reader's Gang Show at the Golders Green Hippodrome aged 12 and appeared on television in the Billy Cotton Band Show.

Upon leaving school, Davidson worked as a supermarket shelf stacker, a messenger, air ticket clerk for a travel agency, a cashier for Wall's ice cream and for Rank Xerox (having trained as a reprographics operator), and a window cleaner.

Davidson started in show business when, as a regular in a pub in Woolwich, he stepped in after the pub's regular comedian was not available. He then became a regular on the London comedy circuit, and first auditioned unsuccessfully for Opportunity Knocks in 1975. His audition for New Faces was more successful, and he won the show by one point, coming second in the overall contest.

=== Television career ===
Davidson's success was quickly followed by many more appearances on television, including What's on Next, and several series of his own television show, The Jim Davidson Show (1979—1982), which ran for five complete series and won Davidson the TV Times award as "Funniest Man on Television".

Davidson appeared on an edition of the BBC1 series Seaside Special, shown on 20 August 1977, hosted by Tony Blackburn and David Hamilton. Davidson's appearance garnered a negative review in The Stage, with the show's reviewer, Martyn Wade, commenting that: "...comedian Jim Davidson had already won first prize for lack of taste with crude racist jokes tracing the adventures of a black man whose nickname was Chalky and whose other names included Toilet-Roll. 'Day-light come and I gotta sign on' is a representative line from Mr Davidson's act."

He starred in TV sitcoms Up the Elephant and Round the Castle (1983–1985) and Home James! (1987–1990). His one-man show for Thames Television, Stand Up Jim Davidson (1990), was recorded at London's Royalty Theatre.

Davidson became known as the host of Big Break (1991–2002), and as the third host of The Generation Game (1995–2002) following Bruce Forsyth and Larry Grayson. In September 2007, Davidson appeared in the third series of Hell's Kitchen (2007) in the UK, and in May 2008 he appeared in the BBC's Comedy Map of Britain.

On 2 January 2013, Davidson was set to become a housemate in the 11th series of Celebrity Big Brother, but was arrested at Heathrow Airport by police officers working on Operation Yewtree. On 3 January 2014, a year after being arrested and without being charged, he became a housemate in the show's 13th series. On 29 January 2014, he left the Big Brother house as the winner.

=== Touring show ===
Davidson's touring material developed from his original London comedy circuit show, aimed for pub and club audiences, a demographic considerably different to that of his television work. He later developed his touring material into his adult pantomime work, including productions with titles such as Sinderella, a spoof of Cinderella, and Boobs in the Wood, a spoof of Robin Hood.

In 2006, for the first time in 14 years, he refused to perform at Great Yarmouth, stating that the resort was "full of overweight people in flip-flops and fat children of all colours and no class".

=== Recording career ===
Davidson appeared in the UK singles chart with the double A-sided "White Christmas" / "Too Risky". It peaked at No. 52 in December 1980.

=== Business ===
Davidson has several business interests. He set up a company which bought or leased several seaside theatres or piers, including the Winter Gardens building in Great Yarmouth, which was converted into a nightclub. He lost £700,000 on a pantomime production of Dick Whittington, and after a meeting with the Inland Revenue in 2003, he sold the company.

=== Armed forces and charity ===
Davidson has entertained the British Armed Forces, and is currently chairman of the British Forces Foundation charity, which aims to promote the wellbeing and esprit de corps of service personnel. Davidson was awarded the OBE in the 2001 New Year Honours List for his services to charity.

Davidson is a Freemason and a long-standing member of the Westminster City Council Lodge No. 2882. He was formerly also a member of the Chelsea Lodge No. 3098 (whose members are all entertainers) but has resigned; he was the founding Worshipful Master of British Forces Foundation Lodge No. 9725 on its formation in 2000.

=== Taxation and bankruptcy ===
On 27 August 2003, after a meeting with the Inland Revenue, Davidson said he spent £10,000 a week on back taxes, commission to agents, maintenance and school fees, and a £2.2 million mortgage: "My problem is money – I used to earn five times as much as I do now, but I still pay the same maintenance, school fees and commission to agents," he told Radio Times magazine.

On 6 July 2006, having failed to keep up payments on a £1.4 million back tax bill that he had reduced to £700,000, Davidson was declared bankrupt.

=== Online career ===
In spring 2020, Davidson launched his own YouTube channel, where he presented short videos each week, giving his take on the recent news events, and sharing his opinion on news stories and events of the day. The channel was launched at the start of the COVID-19 pandemic and subsequent lockdown in the United Kingdom. Davidson continued to upload short videos, usually on a daily basis. In December 2020, after lockdown measures were put into place in England, Davidson named his daily uploads "Lockdown Diary".

He then went on to launch his own separate streaming service Ustreme, featuring himself and other comedians deemed too controversial for the mainstream.

== Controversies ==
Throughout his career, Davidson has made jokes about women, racial and ethnic minorities and gay people in his stand-up act, which has made him a subject of criticism.

=== Accusations of bigotry ===
In September 2007, Davidson participated in the celebrity reality TV programme Hell's Kitchen and attracted negative media attention over accusations of homophobic bullying towards TV presenter and openly gay contestant Brian Dowling. Davidson asked Dowling, "Are you on our side?" when referring to whether or not he would be participating for the boys' or girls' team. Davidson used the word "shirt-lifters" in front of him, and regularly asked if Dowling would like to try on one of "John Virgo's lovely waistcoats", which Davidson owns. The programme was broadcast on ITV on 4 September 2007.

On 10 September, Davidson was asked to leave Hell's Kitchen, following further confrontations with Dowling. After Davidson's exit from the programme, the BBC reported that the broadcasting watchdog Ofcom had received 46 complaints alleging that Davidson had bullied Dowling. Ofcom concluded that nothing unacceptable had happened, but ITV, the channel which had originally broadcast the programme, issued a statement, regretting Davidson's "unacceptable remarks."

Davidson has responded to accusations of prejudice by saying: "It is a difficult thing, comedy, and I'm on a loser. If I cured AIDS and fed Africa and ended Ebola and found that missing aeroplane, I'd still be that horrible racist, sexist, homophobic comedian. By people, with respect, who haven't seen me. Or are judging me from the past."

=== Other incidents ===
On 30 May 1987, he had entered a fish and chip shop on Denmark Street, near Bristol Hippodrome, and had told a policeman, Paul Cox, in the queue 'I have been drinking. Are you going to nick me?' He was subsequently caught in his Jaguar vehicle, with 72 mg of alcohol per millilitre in his blood, twice the legal limit. He said that his wife was arriving to pick him up, and that he had only driven a few yards. The couple had recently returned from two weeks in Barbados. When aged 33, living on Lansdown Place in Bristol with Alison Holloway, he was convicted of drink driving, banned for three years and fined £300 on 5 August 1987 at Bristol court.

In December 2002, Davidson was asked by the manager of the Marriott Bristol Royal Hotel to leave the premises, after it was alleged that he had become confrontational and abusive to staff. Davidson later said that when he was asked by the manager to leave he thought it was a joke, stating: "It's difficult to be abusive when they don't speak English."

In October 2003, Davidson refused to go on stage in Plymouth because his request for wheelchair users in the front row to be moved to other areas was declined. A spokesman for the Plymouth Pavilions, where he was performing as part of a national tour, said: "Jim Davidson apparently took exception to a number of wheelchair users in the front stalls of the Pavilions Arena. Mr Davidson cited the fact that a proportion of his act was aimed at disabled customers and that he would be unable to perform under these circumstances". In a statement Davidson explained he "took the mick" out of everyone in the front row of his shows. "As all the people in the front row were in wheelchairs I feared it would appear I was specifically targeting disabled people. I asked if just some would mind moving. Much of my act depends upon audience reaction and in fact one part of the show involves getting the audience to gang up against the front row".

Laurence Clark, a wheelchair user, performed a show called "The Jim Davidson Guide to Equality" in response to Davidson's act at the Edinburgh Festival Fringe in 2004. Clark stated that he would refuse to perform the show if Davidson himself was in his audience.

In August 2004, comedian Jimmy Carr threatened legal action against Davidson, accusing him of having plagiarised some of his comic material. Davidson responded by saying the claims were "ridiculous", and no further action was taken.

In October 2006, Davidson was accused by a woman of making insensitive jokes about people with cancer, blind people, a wheelchair user, and the recent trial over the killing of Damilola Taylor, prompting the woman to walk out of the show. Davidson vehemently denied the accusations, stating that jokes about blind people and people with cancer would have merited a "mass walkout." He also said the comments about the Damilola Taylor trial were taken out of context: "My actual remark was that I thought the killers should be locked away forever. And if she objects to that then that is her prerogative." Davidson was also quoted as saying: "If what I was saying was true, I would have got up and left myself."

Davidson was called on as a character witness to drug trafficker Brian Brendan Wright in 2007. Despite Davidson's testifying to Wright's character, the judge concluded that Wright was "a master criminal, manipulative, influential and powerful", and sentenced him to 30 years in prison.

On 2 January 2013, as Davidson was set to become a housemate in the 11th series of Celebrity Big Brother, he was arrested at Heathrow Airport by police officers working on Operation Yewtree. On 20 March 2013, he was arrested again over new allegations of sexual offences; however, on 21 August 2013, it was announced that no further action would be taken in relation to the allegations of historic sex abuse, due to insufficient evidence.

In November 2018, Davidson told Nigel Farage on LBC radio that he had been angered by Extinction Rebellion protests in London as the traffic had almost prevented him "from getting his pie and mash".

== Personal life ==
Davidson has written two autobiographies, The Full Monty (1993) and Close to the Edge (2001).

Davidson's numerous marriages prompted the actor John Mills to send a telegram on the occasion of his fourth, which read simply: "Will It Last?" The marriage ended ten years later. Davidson subsequently returned the compliment to Mills and his wife on their 60th wedding anniversary, with a message bearing the same wording.

Davidson is a supporter of Charlton Athletic, the local club in the area where he grew up. In the 1980s, he was a director at AFC Bournemouth.

On 18 June 2014, Davidson attended the assault trial of former N-Dubz rapper Dappy. Davidson said, "Dappy is a good friend of mine. I don't know what's happened in this case but I'm just here to show him my support." Dappy declined Davidson's offer to serve as a character witness.

=== Politics ===
Davidson is a life-long supporter and member of the Conservative Party, as well as the associated Carlton Club. He was a vocal supporter of the party in the 1980s, and became close to Conservative prime minister Margaret Thatcher, who reportedly considered Davidson as her favourite comedian. In 2014, he spoke of his regret for being unable to attend her funeral in 2013, after he was banned from attending after he was investigated for sexual assault during Operation Yewtree.

Davidson is also a supporter of Nigel Farage, the leader of Reform UK and former leader of the UK Independence Party (UKIP). He first met Farage whilst under investigation for sexual assault in 2013, claiming that Farage offered him membership of UKIP, which Davidson described as "the Jim Davidson of the political world" in 2015. He was later offered membership of Reform UK by former Conservative MP Lee Anderson, who defected to the party in 2023, and attended Reform's annual conference in 2024 and 2025. However, Davidson has remained a member of the Conservatives, as he believes leaving the party to join another party could lead to his expulsion from the Carlton Club. Instead, Davidson has spoken of his wish for the Conservatives to merge with Reform UK to form a new political party.

Davidson has criticised the governments of the Labour Party under prime ministers Keir Starmer and Tony Blair, though he claims to "like" Blair himself. Ahead of the 1997 general election, Davidson threatened to leave the United Kingdom if Labour won the election. When Labour won, he remained in the UK. Later in March 2004, he publicly left the United Kingdom for Dubai in the United Arab Emirates. At the time, he declared that "I may as well go to Dubai and be an ethnic minority there than wait five years till I become one here". He moved back to the UK after living in Dubai for five years.

=== Family ===
Davidson has been married five times; all of the marriages have ended in divorce. He has five children by three wives:

- Sue Walpole (married 1971; divorced 1972), one child
- Julie Gullick (married 1981; divorced 1986), one child
- Alison Holloway (married 1987; divorced 1988)
- Tracy Hilton (married 1990; divorced 2000), three children
- Michelle Cotton (married 2009; divorced 2023)

== Credits ==
=== Television ===
- Big Break (222 episodes)
- New Faces
- Stand Up Jim Davidson
- Pingwings
- The Generation Game (143 episodes)
- The Jim Davidson Show
- Up the Elephant and Round the Castle (22 episodes)
- Home James! (25 episodes)
- Life's a Pitch
- What's on Next?
- Tiswas
- Who Wants to Be a Millionaire?
- Hell's Kitchen
- Celebrity Big Brother 13

=== Film ===
- A Zed & Two Noughts (1985), as Joshua Plate
- Colour Me Kubrick (2006), as Lee Pratt

=== Music ===
- "Watching Over You"
- "A Time for Remembering"
- "Love, Please Stop Leaving Me"

"Home By The Sea"

=== Theatre ===
In 2011, Davidson toured with a play, Stand Up...And Be Counted. The play was about the failing career of a troubled racist comedian. Some media commentators drew comparisons between the play's main character and Davidson's own career.

On 18 March 2011, Davidson announced the show was being cancelled because of poor ticket sales, having visited only four of the 12 planned city destinations. Davidson added that he was still in talks to bring the show to the West End at a later date. Davidson also produced and starred in a number of "adult pantomimes", which were blue-humoured versions of conventional pantomimes. These included Sinderella (1995), Boobs in the Wood (1999), Sinderella Comes Again (2004), and Sinderella 2: Scottish Romp (2015).

== Bibliography ==
- Jim Davidson: Close to the Edge. 2001. Ebury Press. ISBN 0091881048

Preceded by Bruce Forsyth	Host of The Generation Game; 1995–2002	Succeeded by Mel and Sue (In 2018)
Preceded by Charlotte Crosby	Celebrity Big Brother UK winner Series 13 (2014)	Succeeded by Gary Busey
