= Opportunity Knocks (British TV series) =

British television talent show (1949–1990)

- Also known as: Bob Says Opportunity Knocks (1987–89)
- Genre: Talent show
- Created by: Hughie Green
- Presented by: Hughie Green (1949–78); Bob Monkhouse (1987–89); Les Dawson (1990)
- Country of origin: United Kingdom
- Original language: English
- No. of series: 1 (BBC Light Programme); 18 (ITV); 4 (BBC1)
- No. of episodes: 33 (BBC Light Programme); 472 (ITV); 48 (BBC1)

Production
- Production locations: Wembley Studios (1956); Didsbury Studios (1964–68); Teddington Studios (1968–78); BBC Television Centre (1987–89); BBC Elstree Centre (1990)
- Running time: 50 minutes (BBC1)
- Production companies: BBC Radio (1949); Associated-Rediffusion (1956); ABC (1964–68); Thames (1968–78); BBC Television (1987–90)

Original release
- Network: BBC Light Programme
- Release: 18 February – 29 September 1949
- Network: ITV
- Release: 20 June – 29 August 1956
- Release: 11 July 1964 – 20 March 1978
- Network: BBC1
- Release: 21 March 1987 – 2 June 1990

Related
- New Faces

Opportunity Knocks is a British television and radio talent show originally hosted by Hughie Green, with a late-1980s revival hosted by Bob Monkhouse, and later by previous winner Les Dawson. From its origin on BBC Radio in 1949 the show provided a platform to fame for acts such as Spike Milligan and Frankie Vaughan. One of the most popular shows on British television, in the 1960s and 1970s it had a weekly audience of 20 million viewers.

The original radio version started on the BBC Light Programme, where it ran from 18 February to 29 September 1949, but moved to Radio Luxembourg in the 1950s. It was shown on ITV from 20 June 1956 to 29 August 1956, produced by Associated Rediffusion. A second run commenced on 11 July 1964 and lasted until 20 March 1978, produced first by ABC and then by Thames. During this period Bob Sharples was musical director. Green presented a single episode of Opportunity Knocks for RTÉ in 1979. It was revived by the BBC (largely in response to ITV's similar revival of New Faces the preceding year) from 21 March 1987 to 2 June 1990, hosted initially by Monkhouse from 1987 to 1989 (under the title Bob Says Opportunity Knocks!) and subsequently by Dawson in 1990. Kiki Dee's hit single "Star" became the theme song for the revived BBC series.

== Voting system ==
Unlike its rival New Faces, the winning acts on Opportunity Knocks were decided not by a panel of experts but by the viewing public. In the ITV version this took the form of a postal vote, the winner of which was announced the following week. The BBC revival was notable for being the first TV show to decide its winner using the now-standard method of a telephone vote. In both versions the studio audience reaction to each act was measured by a clap-o-meter, but this did not count towards the final result.

The programme was recorded the Friday before transmission, so votes had to be in by Thursday. They also, according to host Hughie Green, largely to ensure fairness, had to be in "your own handwriting".

Although Opportunity Knocks did produce a number of talented acts, the method of putting the contest to a public vote did sometimes result in victories for novelty acts, in particular those involving children or animals. On one occasion, the young Su Pollard was beaten into second place by a singing dog.

== Famous alumni ==
Entertainers who appeared included Freddie Starr and the Delmonts, Su Pollard, Paul Daniels, Darren Day, Pete the Plate Spinning Dog, Los Caracas (later to become Middle of the Road), Mary Hopkin, Bonnie Langford, Les Dawson, Maureen Myers, Barry Cummings, Royston Vasey (later to find fame as Roy Chubby Brown), Little and Large, Bobby Crush, Berni Flint, Tony Holland (The Muscle Man), Millican & Nesbitt, Neil Reid, Peters and Lee, Lena Zavaroni, Frank Carson, Max Boyce, Pam Ayres, Juniper Green, Gerry Monroe, Debra Stephenson, Tammy Jones, Paper Lace, Michael Ward, Barry and Paul Elliott and Tony Monopoly. Several winners of Opportunity Knocks (notably Tammy Jones, Champagne, Tony Monopoly) later attempted to represent the UK at the Eurovision Song Contest, taking part in the A Song for Europe competition. Lee Evans appeared in 1986 but was rejected and did not make it past the initial audition. Kaz Hawkins appeared in the 1980s' revival as a child.

== Influence ==
Today, most of the elements of this show are visible on the ITV talent search Britain's Got Talent, which was created by record company executive Simon Cowell. The method of deciding a winner by telephone is used on that show and many other similar programmes around the world.

A reference to the show can be heard on the Beatles' first live performance of "Yesterday" at Blackpool Night Out. George Harrison introduces the song, saying "For Paul McCartney of Liverpool, opportunity knocks!". This version appears on Anthology 2.

== Transmissions ==
=== BBC Light Programme ===
Series	Start date	Final date	Episodes
1	18 February 1949	29 September 1949	33

=== ITV ===
Series	Start date	Final date	Episodes
1	20 June 1956	29 August 1956	11
2	11 July 1964	3 October 1964	13
3	3 July 1965	25 December 1965	26
4	2 July 1966	24 December 1966	26
5	29 April 1967	23 December 1967	35
6	16 March 1968	27 July 1968	20
7	21 August 1968	6 November 1968	12
8	25 December 1968	23 June 1969	27
9	8 September 1969	2 March 1970	26
10	15 June 1970	7 December 1970	26
11	15 March 1971	6 September 1971	26
12	8 November 1971	1 May 1972	26
13	7 August 1972	30 April 1973	39
14	6 August 1973	29 April 1974	39
15	5 August 1974	28 April 1975	39
16	29 September 1975	22 March 1976	26
17	27 September 1976	4 April 1977	28
18	19 September 1977	20 March 1978	27

=== BBC1 ===
Series	Start date	Final date	Episodes
1	21 March 1987	20 June 1987	13
2	5 March 1988	4 June 1988	13
3	4 March 1989	3 June 1989	13
4	31 March 1990	2 June 1990	9
