= List of UK top-ten singles in 1973 =

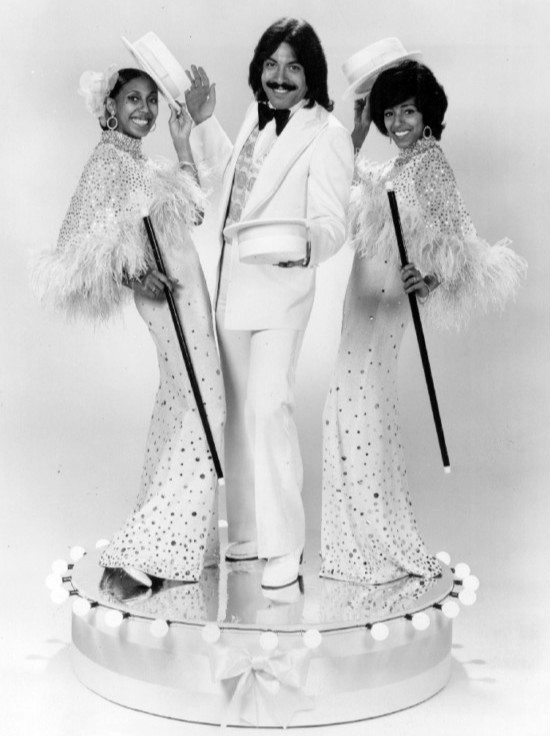
Tony Orlando and Dawn had the best-selling single of 1973 with "Tie a Yellow Ribbon Round the Ole Oak Tree", which spent four weeks at the top spot and lasted 11 weeks in the top 10.

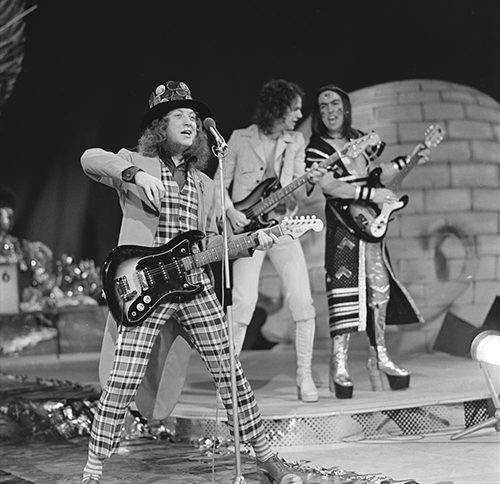
Slade became the first act to have three singles enter the UK charts at number-one; "Cum On Feel The Noize", "Skweeze Me, Pleeze Me", and "Merry Xmas Everybody" (which also became the year's Christmas number-one single). The glam-rock group had two further singles in the UK top 10 this year.

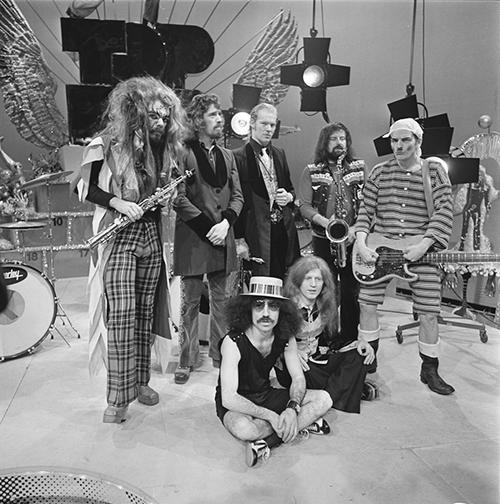
Another glam-rock band who made it big in 1973 was Wizzard, fronted by Roy Wood. Wood had previously achieved chart success a member of both The Move and Electric Light Orchestra. Wizzard scored four top 10 singles during the year, which included the number-one hits "See My Baby Jive" and "Angel Fingers (A Teen Ballad)", as well as their Christmas classic "I Wish It Could Be Christmas Everyday", which peaked at number four for four consecutive weeks.

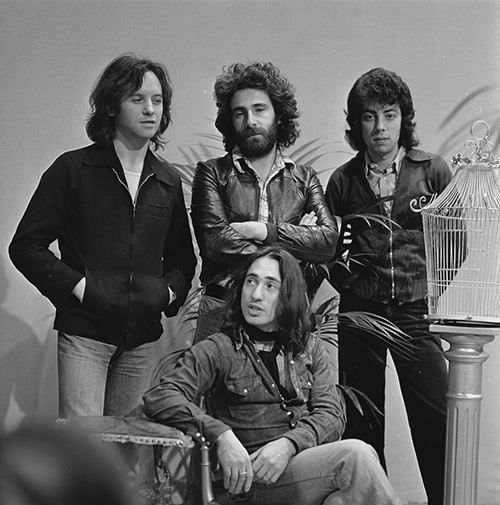
10cc achieved the first of their three UK number-one singles in June of this year with "Rubber Bullets", which spent one week at the top spot. They also reached number ten in September with "The Dean and I".

The UK Singles Chart is one of many music charts compiled by the Official Charts Company that calculates the best-selling singles of the week in the United Kingdom. Before 2004, the chart was only based on the sales of physical singles. This list shows singles that peaked in the Top 10 of the UK Singles Chart during 1973, as well as singles which peaked in 1972 and 1974 but were in the top 10 in 1973. The entry date is when the single appeared in the top 10 for the first time (week ending, as published by the Official Charts Company, which is six days after the chart is announced).

One-hundred and twenty-eight singles were in the top ten in 1973. Eight singles from 1972 remained in the top 10 for several weeks at the beginning of the year, while "The Show Must Go On" by Leo Sayer and "You Won't Find Another Fool Like Me" by The New Seekers featuring Lyn Paul were both released in 1973 but did not reach their peak until 1974. "Nights in White Satin" by The Moody Blues, "Shotgun Wedding" by Roy C and "Solid Gold Easy Action" by T. Rex were the singles from 1972 to reach their peak in 1973. Twenty-nine artists scored multiple entries in the top 10 in 1973. David Essex, Leo Sayer, Marie Osmond, Mud and Wizzard were among the many artists who achieved their first UK charting top 10 single in 1973.

The 1972 Christmas number-one, "Long Haired Lover from Liverpool" by Little Jimmy Osmond, remained at number-one for the first three weeks of 1973. The first new number-one single of the year was "Blockbuster" by The Sweet. Overall, seventeen different singles peaked at number-one in 1973, with Slade (3) having the most singles hit that position.

== Background ==
=== Multiple entries ===
One-hundred and twenty-eight singles charted in the top 10 in 1973, with one-hundred and twenty-one singles reaching their peak this year.

Twenty-nine artists scored multiple entries in the top 10 in 1973. Donny Osmond secured the record for most top 10 hits in 1973 with six hit singles. He scored three top 10 entries in 1973 as a solo artist, with "The Twelfth of Never" and "Young Love" both reaching number-one, and "When I Fall in Love" peaking at number four in November. His sister Marie made her top 10 debut in November with the number two hit "Paper Roses". Donny's total was boosted to six by his participation on The Osmonds recordings. The family group scored two top 10 entries in 1973 with "Going Home", which peaked at number four in July and "Let Me In", which peaked at number two in November. Their number two hit from November 1972, "Crazy Horses", remained in the top 10 for the first three weeks of 1973.

David Bowie peaked in the top 10 with five singles in 1973. He reached number two in January with "The Jean Genie", while "Drive-In Saturday", "Life on Mars" and "Sorrow" all peaked at number three. His single "The Laughing Gnome", originally released in 1967, also entered the top 10, reaching number six in October. Slade made chart history by going straight in at number-one an unprecedented three times with "Cum On Feel The Noize", "Skweeze Me, Pleeze Me", and "Merry Xmas Everybody", the last of which became the Christmas number-one single that year. They also reached number two in October with their single "My Friend Stan". They had five entries in total this year but this included "Gudbuy T'Jane" from the latter part of 1972. Little Jimmy Osmond had two individual entries, including "Long Haired Lover from Liverpool" from 1972 and his number four single "Tweedle Dee" in April, as well as being a part of The Osmonds collective.

David Cassidy, Gary Glitter and Wizzard all scored four top 10 entries in 1973. The Partridge Family singer David Cassidy had two hit singles as part of the group - "Looking Through the Eyes of Love" at number nine and "Walking in the Rain" peaking at number ten - as well as the number-one hit "Daydreamer"/"The Puppy Song", and "I am a Clown"/"Some Kind of a Summer" which reached number three. Gary Glitter's first two entries, "Do You Wanna Touch Me" and "Hello, Hello, I'm Back Again", both peaked at number two, while the remaining two, "I'm the Leader of the Gang (I Am)" and "I Love You Love Me Love", both spent four weeks at number-one. Wizzard were fronted by Roy Wood, an ex-member of The Move and Electric Light Orchestra. Their debut single "Ball Park Incident" peaked at number six in January, while "See My Baby Jive" and "Angel Fingers (A Teen Ballad)" both reached the top spot. They also reached number four in December with "I Wish It Could Be Christmas Everyday".

Solo artists Suzi Quatro, Barry Blue and David Essex all made their top 10 debut in 1973, and all three scored a second entry later in the year. Suzi Quatro made her top 10 debut in May with "Can the Can", which spent a week at number-one in June, while "48 Crash" peaked at number three in August. Barry Blue made his top 10 debut in August with "Dancing on a Saturday Night", which peaked at number two, while "Do You Wanna Dance?" reached number seven in November. David Essex made his top 10 debut in September with "Rock On", which peaked at number three, while "Lamplight" reached number seven in December.

Sweet had three top-ten entries, among these chart-topper "Block Buster!". The other artists with three top 10 singles were 10cc, Elton John, Paul McCartney, T. Rex and Wings.

Gilbert O'Sullivan was one of a number of artists with two top-ten entries, including the number-one single "Get Down". Alice Cooper, The Carpenters, The Partridge Family, Rod Stewart, Roxy Music and Status Quo were among the other artists who had multiple top 10 entries in 1973.

=== Chart debuts ===
Thirty-four artists achieved their first top 10 single in 1973, either as a lead or featured artist. Of these, four went on to record another hit single that year: Barry Blue, David Essex, Nazareth and Suzi Quatro. Wizzard had three other entries in their breakthrough year.

The following table (collapsed on desktop site) does not include acts who had previously charted as part of a group and secured their first top 10 solo single.

| Artist | Number of top 10s | First entry | Chart position | Other entries |
|---|---|---|---|---|
| Wizzard | 4 | "Ball Park Incident" | 6 | "See My Baby Jive" (1), "Angel Fingers (A Teen Ballad)" (1), "I Wish It Could Be Christmas Everyday" (4) |
| Carly Simon | 1 | "You're So Vain" | 3 | — |
| Judge Dread | 1 | "Big Seven" | 8 | — |
| Harold Melvin & the Blue Notes | 1 | "If You Don't Know Me by Now" | 9 | — |
| Strawbs | 1 | "Part of the Union" | 2 | — |
| Focus | 1 | "Sylvia" | 4 | — |
| Thin Lizzy | 1 | "Whisky in the Jar" | 6 | — |
| The Detroit Emeralds | 1 | "Feel the Need in Me" | 4 | — |
| Roberta Flack | 1 | "Killing Me Softly with His Song" | 6 | — |
| Jimmy Helms | 1 | "Gonna Make You an Offer You Can't Refuse" | 8 | — |
| The O'Jays | 1 | "Love Train" | 9 | — |
| Geordie | 1 | "All Because of You" | 6 | — |
| Eumir Deodato | 1 | "Also Sprach Zarathustra (2001)" | 7 | — |
| Suzi Quatro | 2 | "Can the Can" | 1 | "48 Crash" (3) |
| Medicine Head | 1 | "One and One Is One" | 3 | — |
| Nazareth | 2 | "Broken Down Angel" | 9 | "Bad Bad Boy" (10) |
| Lou Reed | 1 | "Walk on the Wild Side" | 10 | — |
| Stealers Wheel | 1 | "Stuck in the Middle with You" | 8 | — |
| Peters and Lee | 1 | "Welcome Home" | 1 | — |
| Hot Shots | 1 | "Snoopy vs. the Red Baron" | 4 | — |
| Clifford T. Ward | 1 | "Gaye" | 8 | — |
| Limmie & Family Cookin' | 1 | "You Can Do Magic" | 3 | — |
| Barry Blue | 2 | "Dancin' (on a Saturday Night)" | 2 | "Do You Wanna Dance?" (7) |
| First Choice | 1 | "Smarty Pants" | 9 | — |
| David Essex | 2 | "Rock On" | 3 | "Lamplight" (7) |
| Hudson Ford | 1 | "Pick Up the Pieces" | 8 | — |
| Bobby "Boris" Pickett & the Crypt-Kickers | 1 | "Monster Mash" | 3 | — |
| Simon Park Orchestra | 1 | "Eye Level" | 1 | — |
| Manfred Mann's Earth Band | 1 | "Joybringer" | 9 | — |
| The Detroit Spinners | 1 | "Ghetto Child" | 7 | — |
| Mud | 1 | "Dyna-mite" | 4 | — |
| Marie Osmond | 1 | "Paper Roses" | 2 | — |
| Alvin Stardust | 1 | "My Coo Ca Choo" | 2 | — |
| Leo Sayer | 1 | "The Show Must Go On" | 2 | — |

Notes

Roger Daltrey of The Who scored his first and only solo hit single in the UK in 1973 with "Giving It All Away". With the band he had achieved eleven top 10 entries by that point (a re-release of The Who's 1966 hit "Substitute" would become the twelfth in 1976) including "Pinball Wizard" and "My Generation". Bryan Ferry came to prominence as lead singer of Roxy Music who peaked at number four in 1972 for the first time with "Virginia Plain". However 1973's "A Hard Rain's Gonna Fall" was a top 10 entry under in his own name. Manfred Mann previously appeared in the chart with his eponymous band. After this group and short-lived act Manfred Mann Chapter Three disbanded, he formed Manfred Mann's Earth Band.

=== Songs from films ===
The only song from a film to enter the top 10 in 1973 was "Live and Let Die" (from Live and Let Die). Additionally, "When I Fall in Love" was originally recorded by Nat King Cole for the 1957 film Istanbul.

=== Best-selling singles ===
Tony Orlando and Dawn had the best-selling single of the year with "Tie a Yellow Ribbon Round the Ole Oak Tree". The single spent eleven weeks in the top 10 (including four weeks at number one) and was certified by the BPI. "Eye Level" by Simon Park Orchestra came in second place. Peters and Lee's "Welcome Home", "Block Buster!" from The Sweet and "Cum On Feel the Noize" by Slade made up the top five. Singles by Wizzard, Gary Glitter ("I'm the Leader of the Gang (I Am)" & "I Love You Love Me Love"), Donny Osmond and Al Martino were also in the top ten best-selling singles of the year.

== Top-ten singles ==
Key

| Symbol | Meaning |
|---|---|
| ‡ | Single peaked in 1972 but still in chart in 1973. |
| ♦ | Single released in 1973 but peaked in 1974. |
| (#) | Year-end top-ten single position and rank |
| Entered | The date that the single first appeared in the chart. |
| Peak | Highest position that the single reached in the UK Singles Chart. |

| Entered (week ending) | Weeks in top 10 | Single | Artist | Peak | Peak reached (week ending) | Weeks at peak |
Singles in 1972
| 11 November 1972 | 9 | "My Ding-a-Ling" ‡ | Chuck Berry | 1 | 25 November 1972 | 4 |
| 18 November 1972 | 10 | "Crazy Horses" ‡ | The Osmonds | 2 | 25 November 1972 | 3 |
| 25 November 1972 | 8 | "Gudbuy T'Jane" ‡ | Slade | 2 | 16 December 1972 | 1 |
| 9 December 1972 | 7 | "Solid Gold Easy Action" | T. Rex | 2 | 6 January 1973 | 1 |
| 9 December 1972 | 11 | "Long Haired Lover from Liverpool" ‡ | Little Jimmy Osmond | 1 | 23 December 1972 | 5 |
| 16 December 1972 | 2 | "Shotgun Wedding" ^{[A]} | Roy C | 8 | 6 January 1973 | 1 |
| 23 December 1972 | 3 | "Happy Xmas (War is Over)" ‡ | John Lennon, Yoko Ono & Plastic Ono Band with the Harlem Community Choir | 4 | 23 December 1972 | 2 |
| 23 December 1972 | 3 | "Nights in White Satin" ^{[B]} | The Moody Blues | 9 | 6 January 1973 | 1 |
Singles in 1973
| 6 January 1973 | 5 | "The Jean Genie" | David Bowie | 2 | 13 January 1973 | 1 |
| 6 January 1973 | 4 | "Hi, Hi, Hi"/"C Moon" ^{[C]} | Wings | 5 | 13 January 1973 | 2 |
| 13 January 1973 | 4 | "Ball Park Incident" | Wizzard | 6 | 13 January 1973 | 3 |
| 13 January 1973 | 6 | "You're So Vain" | Carly Simon | 3 | 3 February 1973 | 1 |
| 13 January 1973 | 2 | "Big Seven" | Judge Dread | 8 | 13 January 1973 | 1 |
| 13 January 1973 | 2 | "Always on My Mind" | Elvis Presley | 9 | 20 January 1973 | 1 |
| 20 January 1973 | 8 | "Block Buster!" (#4) | Sweet | 1 | 27 January 1973 | 5 |
| 27 January 1973 | 6 | "Do You Wanna Touch Me" | Gary Glitter | 2 | 3 February 1973 | 2 |
| 27 January 1973 | 3 | "Wishing Well" | Free | 7 | 10 February 1973 | 1 |
| 27 January 1973 | 2 | "If You Don't Know Me by Now" | Harold Melvin & the Blue Notes | 9 | 27 January 1973 | 2 |
| 27 January 1973 | 5 | "Daniel" | Elton John | 4 | 17 February 1973 | 1 |
| 3 February 1973 | 6 | "Part of the Union" | Strawbs | 2 | 17 February 1973 | 3 |
| 10 February 1973 | 2 | "Paper Plane" | Status Quo | 8 | 10 February 1973 | 1 |
| 10 February 1973 | 5 | "Sylvia" | Focus | 4 | 24 February 1973 | 2 |
| 10 February 1973 | 3 | "Roll Over Beethoven" | Electric Light Orchestra | 6 | 17 February 1973 | 1 |
| 17 February 1973 | 4 | "Whiskey in the Jar" | Thin Lizzy | 6 | 24 February 1973 | 1 |
| 24 February 1973 | 5 | "Cindy Incidentally" | Faces | 2 | 10 March 1973 | 1 |
| 24 February 1973 | 2 | "Looking Through the Eyes of Love" | The Partridge Family | 9 | 24 February 1973 | 2 |
| 24 February 1973 | 3 | "Baby, I Love You" | Dave Edmunds | 8 | 3 March 1973 | 1 |
| 3 March 1973 | 6 | "Cum On Feel the Noize" (#5) | Slade | 1 | 3 March 1973 | 4 |
| 3 March 1973 | 5 | "Feel the Need in Me" | The Detroit Emeralds | 4 | 17 March 1973 | 1 |
| 10 March 1973 | 4 | "20th Century Boy" | T. Rex | 3 | 10 March 1973 | 3 |
| 10 March 1973 | 3 | "Hello Hooray" | Alice Cooper | 6 | 17 March 1973 | 1 |
| 10 March 1973 | 5 | "Killing Me Softly with His Song" | Roberta Flack | 6 | 24 March 1973 | 1 |
| 10 March 1973 | 1 | "Doctor, My Eyes" | The Jackson 5 | 9 | 10 March 1973 | 1 |
| 17 March 1973 | 7 | "The Twelfth of Never" (#9) | Donny Osmond | 1 | 31 March 1973 | 1 |
| 17 March 1973 | 2 | "Gonna Make You an Offer You Can't Refuse" | Jimmy Helms | 8 | 17 March 1973 | 1 |
| 24 March 1973 | 5 | "Power to All Our Friends" ^{[D]} | Cliff Richard | 4 | 24 March 1973 | 3 |
| 24 March 1973 | 7 | "Get Down" | Gilbert O'Sullivan | 1 | 7 April 1973 | 2 |
| 31 March 1973 | 11 | "Tie a Yellow Ribbon Round the Ole Oak Tree" (#1) | Tony Orlando and Dawn | 1 | 21 April 1973 | 4 |
| 31 March 1973 | 6 | "I Am a Clown"/"Some Kind of a Summer" | David Cassidy | 3 | 14 April 1973 | 1 |
| 31 March 1973 | 4 | "Never Never Never" | Shirley Bassey | 8 | 7 April 1973 | 2 |
| 7 April 1973 | 5 | "Tweedle Dee" | Little Jimmy Osmond | 4 | 21 April 1973 | 1 |
| 7 April 1973 | 2 | "Love Train" | The O'Jays | 9 | 7 April 1973 | 2 |
| 14 April 1973 | 7 | "Hello, Hello, I'm Back Again" | Gary Glitter | 2 | 21 April 1973 | 3 |
| 14 April 1973 | 3 | "Pyjamarama" | Roxy Music | 10 | 14 April 1973 | 3 |
| 21 April 1973 | 5 | "Drive-In Saturday" | David Bowie | 3 | 5 May 1973 | 1 |
| 28 April 1973 | 2 | "All Because of You" | Geordie | 6 | 28 April 1973 | 1 |
| 28 April 1973 | 2 | "My Love" ^{[C]}^{[E]} | Paul McCartney and Wings | 9 | 28 April 1973 | 2 |
| 5 May 1973 | 6 | "Hell Raiser" | Sweet | 2 | 12 May 1973 | 3 |
| 5 May 1973 | 8 | "See My Baby Jive" (#6) | Wizzard | 1 | 19 May 1973 | 4 |
| 5 May 1973 | 4 | "Brother Louie" | Hot Chocolate | 7 | 12 May 1973 | 1 |
| 12 May 1973 | 3 | "Giving It All Away" | Roger Daltrey | 5 | 12 May 1973 | 1 |
| 12 May 1973 | 6 | "And I Love You So" | Perry Como | 3 | 26 May 1973 | 2 |
| 12 May 1973 | 2 | "No More Mr. Nice Guy" | Alice Cooper | 10 | 12 May 1973 | 2 |
| 19 May 1973 | 3 | "Also Sprach Zarathustra (2001)" | Deodato | 7 | 26 May 1973 | 1 |
| 26 May 1973 | 6 | "Can the Can" | Suzi Quatro | 1 | 16 June 1973 | 1 |
| 26 May 1973 | 5 | "One and One is One" | Medicine Head | 3 | 9 June 1973 | 1 |
| 2 June 1973 | 3 | "You Are the Sunshine of My Life" | Stevie Wonder | 7 | 2 June 1973 | 2 |
| 2 June 1973 | 1 | "Broken Down Angel" | Nazareth | 9 | 2 June 1973 | 1 |
| 2 June 1973 | 1 | "Walk on the Wild Side" | Lou Reed | 10 | 2 June 1973 | 1 |
| 9 June 1973 | 6 | "Rubber Bullets" | 10cc | 1 | 23 June 1973 | 1 |
| 9 June 1973 | 6 | "Albatross" ^{[F]} | Fleetwood Mac | 2 | 23 June 1973 | 1 |
| 9 June 1973 | 2 | "Walking in the Rain" | The Partridge Family | 10 | 9 June 1973 | 2 |
| 16 June 1973 | 4 | "The Groover" | T. Rex | 4 | 23 June 1973 | 1 |
| 16 June 1973 | 3 | "Stuck in the Middle with You" | Stealers Wheel | 8 | 16 June 1973 | 2 |
| 23 June 1973 | 11 | "Welcome Home" (#3) | Peters and Lee | 1 | 21 July 1973 | 1 |
| 23 June 1973 | 5 | "Snoopy vs. the Red Baron" | The Hotshots | 4 | 14 July 1973 | 1 |
| 23 June 1973 | 4 | "Give Me Love (Give Me Peace on Earth)" | George Harrison | 8 | 30 June 1973 | 1 |
| 30 June 1973 | 5 | "Skweeze Me, Pleeze Me" | Slade | 1 | 30 June 1973 | 3 |
| 30 June 1973 | 1 | "Live and Let Die" ^{[C]} | Paul McCartney and Wings | 9 | 30 June 1973 | 1 |
| 7 July 1973 | 6 | "Life on Mars" | David Bowie | 3 | 14 July 1973 | 3 |
| 7 July 1973 | 4 | "Born to Be with You" | Dave Edmunds | 5 | 14 July 1973 | 1 |
| 7 July 1973 | 3 | "Take Me to the Mardi Gras" | Paul Simon | 7 | 14 July 1973 | 1 |
| 14 July 1973 | 3 | "Saturday Night's Alright for Fighting" | Elton John | 7 | 21 July 1973 | 2 |
| 21 July 1973 | 7 | "I'm the Leader of the Gang (I Am)" (#7) | Gary Glitter | 1 | 28 July 1973 | 4 |
| 21 July 1973 | 5 | "Alright, Alright, Alright" | Mungo Jerry | 3 | 4 August 1973 | 2 |
| 21 July 1973 | 5 | "Going Home" | The Osmonds | 4 | 4 August 1973 | 1 |
| 28 July 1973 | 1 | "Gaye" | Clifford T. Ward | 8 | 28 July 1973 | 1 |
| 28 July 1973 | 2 | "Randy" | Blue Mink | 9 | 28 July 1973 | 1 |
| 4 August 1973 | 4 | "48 Crash" | Suzi Quatro | 3 | 18 August 1973 | 1 |
| 4 August 1973 | 6 | "Yesterday Once More" | The Carpenters | 2 | 18 August 1973 | 2 |
| 4 August 1973 | 8 | "Spanish Eyes" (#10) | Al Martino | 5 | 18 August 1973 | 3 |
| 4 August 1973 | 1 | "Touch Me in the Morning" | Diana Ross | 9 | 4 August 1973 | 1 |
| 11 August 1973 | 2 | "Ying Tong Song" ^{[G]} | The Goons | 9 | 11 August 1973 | 2 |
| 11 August 1973 | 1 | "Bad Bad Boy" | Nazareth | 10 | 11 August 1973 | 1 |
| 18 August 1973 | 5 | "You Can Do Magic" | Limmie & Family Cookin' | 3 | 1 September 1973 | 1 |
| 18 August 1973 | 6 | "Dancin' (on a Saturday Night)" ^{[H]} | Barry Blue | 2 | 1 September 1973 | 2 |
| 25 August 1973 | 5 | "Young Love" | Donny Osmond | 1 | 25 August 1973 | 4 |
| 25 August 1973 | 2 | "Smarty Pants" | First Choice | 9 | 25 August 1973 | 1 |
| 1 September 1973 | 2 | "Like Sister and Brother" | The Drifters | 7 | 1 September 1973 | 1 |
| 1 September 1973 | 1 | "Summer (The First Time)" | Bobby Goldsboro | 9 | 1 September 1973 | 1 |
| 8 September 1973 | 5 | "Angel Fingers (A Teen Ballad)" | Wizzard | 1 | 22 September 1973 | 1 |
| 8 September 1973 | 5 | "Rock On" | David Essex | 3 | 15 September 1973 | 2 |
| 8 September 1973 | 4 | "Angie" | The Rolling Stones | 5 | 15 September 1973 | 2 |
| 8 September 1973 | 2 | "Pick Up the Pieces" | Hudson Ford | 8 | 15 September 1973 | 1 |
| 15 September 1973 | 3 | "Oh No Not My Baby" | Rod Stewart | 6 | 22 September 1973 | 2 |
| 15 September 1973 | 1 | "The Dean and I" | 10cc | 10 | 15 September 1973 | 1 |
| 22 September 1973 | 5 | "The Ballroom Blitz" | Sweet | 2 | 22 September 1973 | 3 |
| 22 September 1973 | 5 | "Monster Mash" | Bobby "Boris" Pickett and the Crypt-Kickers | 3 | 6 October 1973 | 1 |
| 22 September 1973 | 8 | "For the Good Times" | Perry Como | 7 | 6 October 1973 | 3 |
| 29 September 1973 | 7 | "Eye Level" (#2) ^{[I]} | Simon Park Orchestra | 1 | 29 September 1973 | 4 |
| 29 September 1973 | 5 | "Nutbush City Limits" | Ike & Tina Turner | 4 | 13 October 1973 | 2 |
| 29 September 1973 | 1 | "All the Way from Memphis" | Mott the Hoople | 10 | 29 September 1973 | 1 |
| 6 October 1973 | 5 | "My Friend Stan" | Slade | 2 | 13 October 1973 | 1 |
| 6 October 1973 | 4 | "The Laughing Gnome" | David Bowie | 6 | 13 October 1973 | 2 |
| 6 October 1973 | 2 | "Joybringer" | Manfred Mann's Earth Band | 9 | 6 October 1973 | 2 |
| 13 October 1973 | 6 | "Daydreamer"/"The Puppy Song" | David Cassidy | 1 | 27 October 1973 | 3 |
| 13 October 1973 | 5 | "Caroline" | Status Quo | 5 | 27 October 1973 | 2 |
| 20 October 1973 | 4 | "Goodbye Yellow Brick Road" | Elton John | 6 | 27 October 1973 | 2 |
| 27 October 1973 | 5 | "Sorrow" | David Bowie | 3 | 3 November 1973 | 2 |
| 27 October 1973 | 1 | "A Hard Rain's Gonna Fall" | Bryan Ferry | 10 | 27 October 1973 | 1 |
| 3 November 1973 | 6 | "Let Me In" | The Osmonds | 2 | 10 November 1973 | 3 |
| 3 November 1973 | 3 | "Ghetto Child" | The Detroit Spinners | 7 | 3 November 1973 | 1 |
| 3 November 1973 | 4 | "Top of the World" | The Carpenters | 5 | 10 November 1973 | 1 |
| 10 November 1973 | 5 | "Dyna-mite" | Mud | 4 | 10 November 1973 | 2 |
| 17 November 1973 | 9 | "I Love You Love Me Love" (#8) | Gary Glitter | 1 | 17 November 1973 | 4 |
| 17 November 1973 | 3 | "When I Fall in Love" | Donny Osmond | 4 | 1 December 1973 | 1 |
| 17 November 1973 | 2 | "Photograph" | Ringo Starr | 8 | 17 November 1973 | 1 |
| 17 November 1973 | 4 | "Do You Wanna Dance?" | Barry Blue | 7 | 24 November 1973 | 1 |
| 24 November 1973 | 8 | "Paper Roses" | Marie Osmond | 2 | 8 December 1973 | 1 |
| 24 November 1973 | 11 | "My Coo Ca Choo" | Alvin Stardust | 2 | 1 December 1973 | 1 |
| 1 December 1973 | 3 | "Why, Oh Why, Oh Why" | Gilbert O'Sullivan | 6 | 1 December 1973 | 1 |
| 1 December 1973 | 11 | "You Won't Find Another Fool Like Me" ♦ | The New Seekers | 1 | 19 January 1974 | 1 |
| 1 December 1973 | 7 | "Lamplight" | David Essex | 7 | 8 December 1973 | 2 |
| 8 December 1973 | 5 | "Roll Away the Stone" | Mott the Hoople | 8 | 8 December 1973 | 2 |
| 15 December 1973 | 6 | "Merry Xmas Everybody" | Slade | 1 | 15 December 1973 | 5 |
| 15 December 1973 | 5 | "I Wish It Could Be Christmas Everyday" | Wizzard | 4 | 22 December 1973 | 4 |
| 15 December 1973 | 4 | "Street Life" | Roxy Music | 9 | 15 December 1973 | 1 |
| 22 December 1973 | 9 | "The Show Must Go On" ♦ | Leo Sayer | 2 | 19 January 1974 | 1 |

== Entries by artist ==
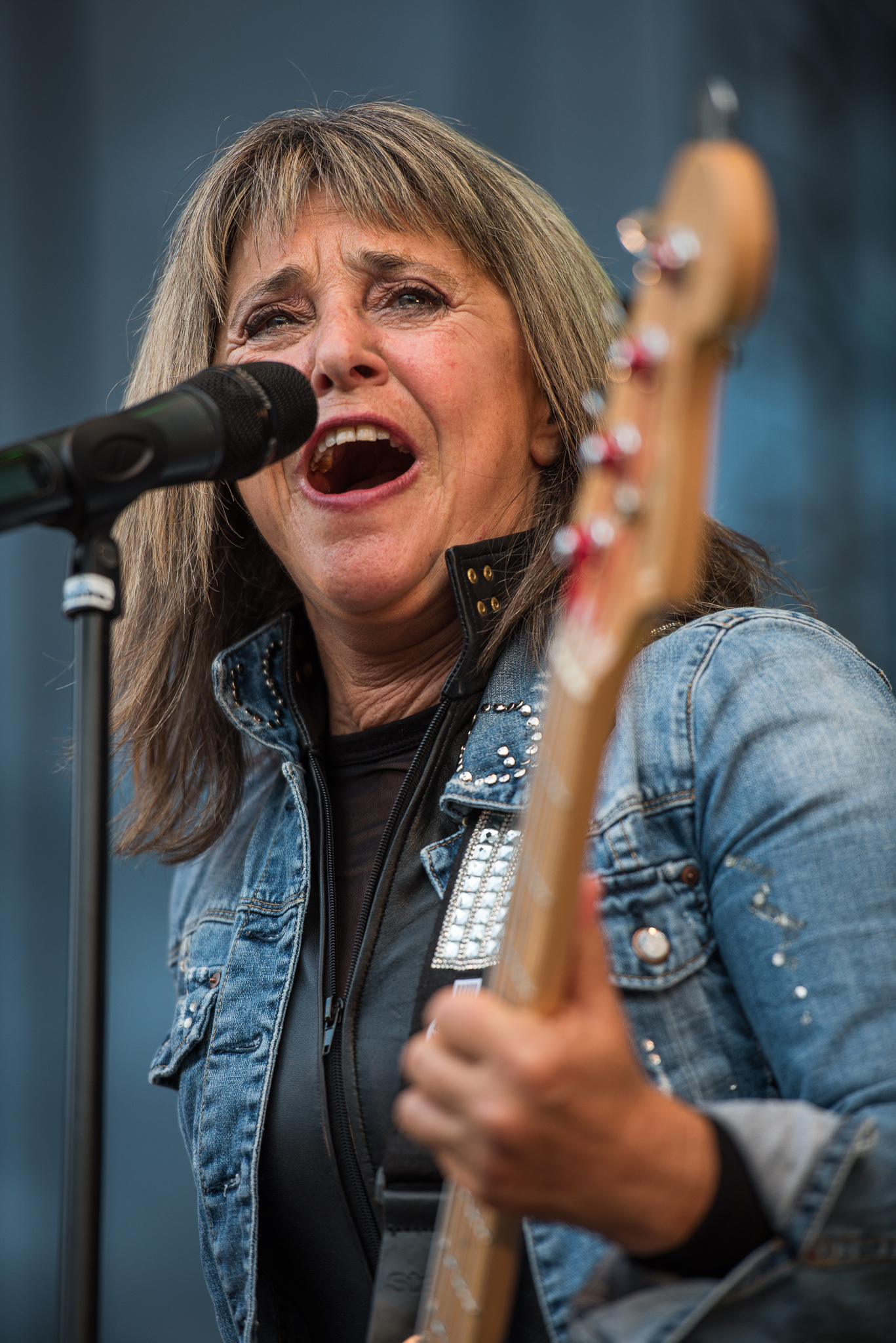
Suzi Quatro (pictured in 2017) made her UK chart debut in 1973, scoring two top 10 entries, including the first of her two number-one hits, "Can the Can", which topped the chart for one week in June.

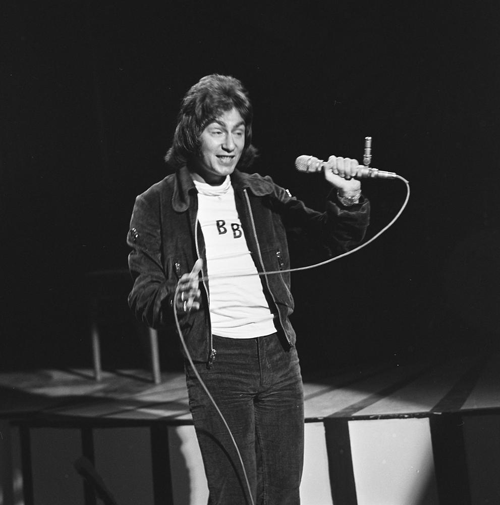
Glam-rock singer Barry Blue entered the UK top 10 in August with his best-known song "Dancin' (on a Saturday Night)", which spent two weeks at number two. His follow-up, "Do You Wanna Dance?", also made the top 10, peaking at number seven in November.

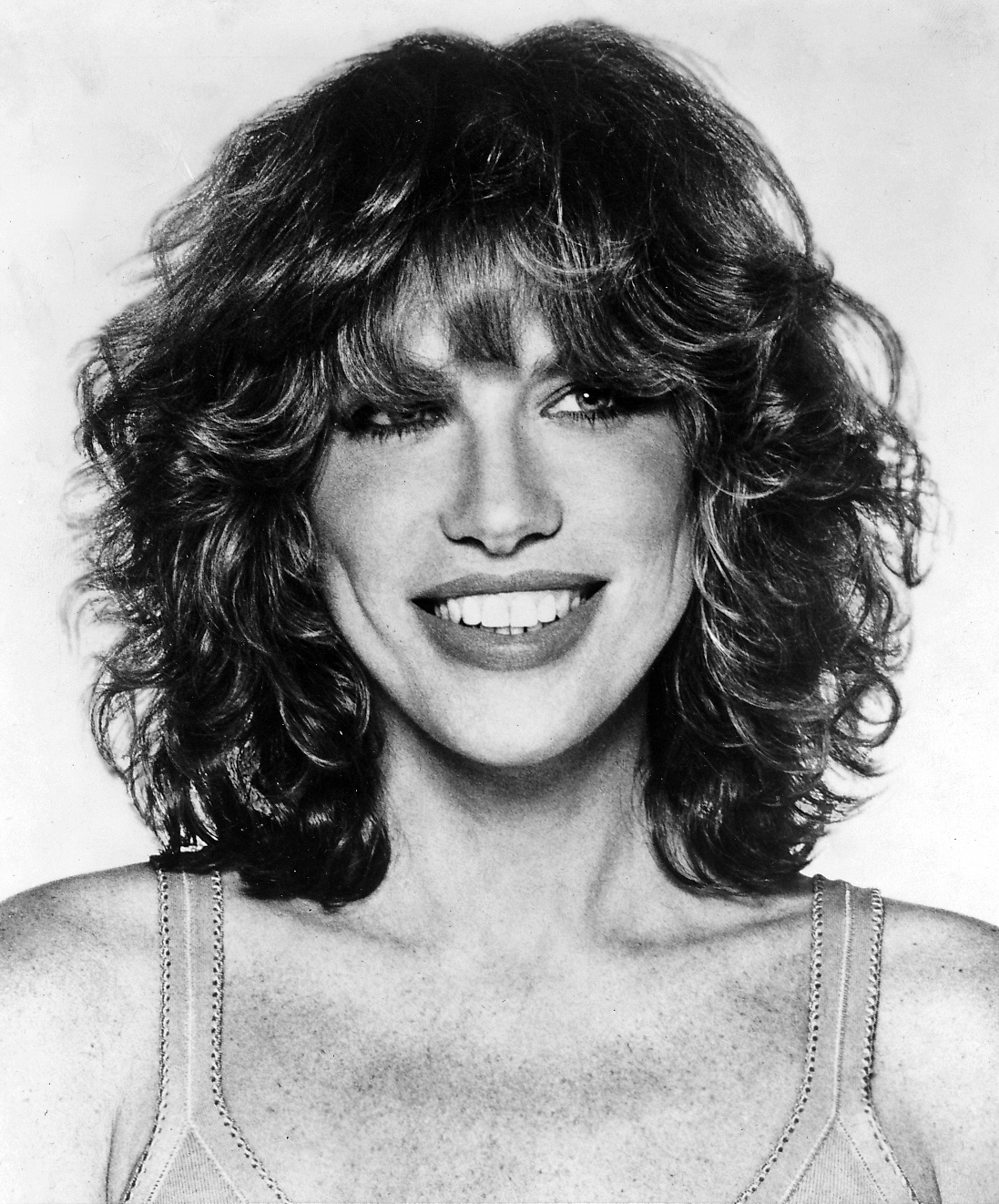
Carly Simon made her UK top 10 debut in January 1973 with the self-penned ballad "You're So Vain", which peaked at number three. Although Simon would have a further three UK top-ten singles during her career, "You're So Vain" remains her highest-charting single in the United Kingdom.

The following table shows artists who achieved two or more top 10 entries in 1973, including singles that reached their peak in 1972. The figures include both main artists and featured artists, while appearances on ensemble charity records are also counted for each artist. The total number of weeks an artist spent in the top ten in 1973 is also shown.

| Entries | Artist | Weeks | Singles |
|---|---|---|---|
| 6 | Donny Osmond ^{[J]}^{[K]} | 25 | "Crazy Horses", "Going Home", "Let Me In", "The Twelfth of Never", "When I Fall in Love", "Young Love" |
| 5 | David Bowie | 25 | "Drive-In Saturday", "Life on Mars", "Sorrow", "The Laughing Gnome", "The Jean Genie" |
| 5 | Little Jimmy Osmond ^{[J]}^{[K]} | 22 | "Crazy Horses", "Going Home", "Let Me In", "Long Haired Lover from Liverpool", "Tweedle Dee" |
| 5 | Slade ^{[J]} | 21 | "Cum On Feel the Noize", "Gudbuy T'Jane", "Merry Xmas Everybody", "My Friend Stan", "Skweeze Me, Pleeze Me" |
| 4 | David Cassidy ^{[L]} | 16 | "Daydreamer"/"The Puppy Song", "I Am a Clown"/"Some Kind of a Summer", "Looking Through the Eyes of Love", "Walking in the Rain" |
| 4 | Gary Glitter | 27 | "Do You Wanna Touch Me", "Hello, Hello, I'm Back Again", "I'm the Leader of the Gang (I Am)", "I Love You Love Me Love" |
| 4 | Wizzard | 20 | "Angel Fingers (A Teen Ballad)", "Ball Park Incident", "I Wish It Could Be Christmas Everyday", "See My Baby Jive" |
| 3 | Elton John | 12 | "Daniel", "Goodbye Yellow Brick Road", "Saturday Night's Alright for Fighting" |
| 3 | The Osmonds | 10 | "Crazy Horses", "Going Home", "Let Me In" |
| 3 | Paul McCartney ^{[M]} | 7 | "Hi Hi Hi"/"C Moon", "Live and Let Die", "My Love" |
| 3 | Sweet | 19 | "The Ballroom Blitz", "Block Buster!", "Hell Raiser" |
| 3 | T. Rex ^{[N]} | 11 | "20th Century Boy", "The Groover", "Solid Gold Easy Action" |
| 3 | Wings | 7 | "Hi Hi Hi"/"C Moon", "Live and Let Die", "My Love" |
| 2 | 10cc | 7 | "The Dean and I", "Rubber Bullets" |
| 2 | Alice Cooper | 5 | "Hello Hooray", "No More Mr. Nice Guy" |
| 2 | Barry Blue | 10 | "Dancin' (on a Saturday Night)", "Do You Wanna Dance?" |
| 2 | The Carpenters | 10 | "Top of the World", "Yesterday Once More" |
| 2 | Dave Edmunds | 7 | "Baby, I Love You", "Born to Be with You" |
| 2 | David Essex | 10 | "Lamplight", "Rock On" |
| 2 | Gilbert O'Sullivan | 10 | "Get Down", "Why, Oh Why, Oh Why" |
| 2 | Mott the Hoople | 5 | "All the Way from Memphis", "Roll Away the Stone" |
| 2 | Nazareth | 2 | "Bad Bad Boy", "Broken Down Angel" |
| 2 | The Partridge Family | 4 | "Looking Through the Eyes of Love", "Walking in the Rain" |
| 2 | Perry Como | 14 | "And I Love You So", "For the Good Times" |
| 2 | Rod Stewart ^{[O]} | 8 | "Cindy Incidentally", "Oh No Not My Baby" |
| 2 | Roxy Music | 6 | "Pyjamarama", "Street Life" |
| 2 | Status Quo | 7 | "Caroline", "Paper Plane" |
| 2 | Suzi Quatro | 10 | "48 Crash", "Can the Can" |

== See also ==
- 1973 in British music
- List of number-one singles from the 1970s (UK)

== Notes ==
- ^{a} "Shotgun Wedding" re-entered the top 10 at number 8 on 6 January 1973 (week ending). It originally peaked at number 6 on its initial release in 1966.
- ^{b} "Nights in White Satin" originally peaked outside the top 10 at number 19 on its initial release in 1968.
- ^{c} "My Love" and "Live and Let Die" were both credited to Paul McCartney and Wings, while "Hi, Hi, Hi"/"C Moon" was credited to Wings.
- ^{d} "Power to All Our Friends" was the United Kingdom's entry at the Eurovision Song Contest in 1973.
- ^{e} "My Love" re-entered the top 10 at number 9 on 12 May 1973 (week ending).
- ^{f} "Albatross" originally peaked at number 1 on its initial release in 1968. In 1973, the song was re-released as part of a CBS Records series entitled "Hall of Fame Hits".
- ^{g} "Ying Tong Song" originally peaked at number 3 on its initial release in 1956.
- ^{h} "Dancin' (on a Saturday Night)" peaked at number 1 on the Melody Maker charts on 15 September 1973 (week ending).
- ^{i} "Eye Level" was the theme tune to the television series Van der Valk.
- ^{j} Figure includes single that peaked in 1972.
- ^{k} Figures includes three top 10 hits with the group The Osmonds.
- ^{l} Figures includes two top 10 hits with the group The Partridge Family.
- ^{m} Figures includes three top 10 hits with the group Wings.
- ^{n} Figures includes single that first charted in 1972 but peaked in 1973.
- ^{o} Figure includes a top 10 hit with the group Faces.
- ^{p} Figure includes a top 10 hit with the group The Rolling Stones.
