= 1973 in British music =

This is a summary of 1973 in music in the United Kingdom, including the official charts from that year.

== Events ==
- 4 January – At the short-lived Winter Proms season, the Berlin Philharmonic makes its Proms debut with performances of Beethoven’s Fourth and Fifth Symphonies conducted by Herbert von Karajan.
- 9 January – Mick Jagger's request for a Japanese visa is rejected on account of a 1969 drug conviction, putting an end to The Rolling Stones' plans to perform in Japan during their forthcoming tour.
- 18 January – The Rolling Stones' benefit concert for Nicaraguan earthquake victims raises over $350,000
- 14 February – David Bowie collapses from exhaustion after a performance at New York's Madison Square Garden.
- 1 March – Pink Floyd releases The Dark Side of the Moon, which goes on to become one of the best-selling albums of all time.
- 8 March – Paul McCartney is fined $240 after pleading guilty to charges of growing marijuana outside his Scottish farm.
- 14 March – The singers Stephen Stills and Véronique Sanson are married near Guildford, England.
- 7 April – Cliff Richard takes part in the 18th Eurovision Song Contest. He finishes in 3rd place with the song "Power to All Our Friends".
- 4 May – 29 July – Led Zeppelin embarks on a tour of the United States, during which they set the record for highest attendance for a concert, 56,800, at the Tampa Stadium in Tampa, Florida. The record was previously held by The Beatles. Performances for the movie The Song Remains the Same are also filmed.
- 12 May – David Bowie is the first rock artist to perform at Earls Court Exhibition Centre.
- 25 May – Mike Oldfield's Tubular Bells becomes the first release on Richard Branson's newly launched Virgin label.
- May – Benjamin Britten has surgery to replace a failing heart valve.
- 4 June – Ronnie Lane plays his last show with Faces at the Edmonton Sundown in London. Lane had informed the band three weeks earlier that he was quitting.
- 16 June – Benjamin Britten's opera Death in Venice, receives its première at Snape Maltings.
- 30 June – Ian Gillan quits Deep Purple.
- 3 July – David Bowie 'retires' his stage persona Ziggy Stardust in front of a shocked audience at the Hammersmith Odeon at the end of his British tour.
- 4 July – Slade drummer Don Powell is critically injured in a car crash in Wolverhampton; his 20-year-old girlfriend is killed.
- 13 July – Queen release their debut album.
- 15 July – Ray Davies of The Kinks makes an emotional outburst during a performance at White City Stadium, announcing he is quitting the group. He later withdraws the statement.
- 20 August – The London Symphony Orchestra becomes the first British orchestra to take part in the Salzburg Festival.
- 20 October – Queen Elizabeth II opens Sydney Opera House.
- November – Karl Jenkins is among the participants in a live-in-the-studio performance of Mike Oldfield's Tubular Bells for the BBC.
- 20 November – The Who open their Quadrophenia US tour with a concert at San Francisco's Cow Palace, but drummer Keith Moon passes out and has to be carried off the stage. Nineteen-year-old fan Scot Halpin is selected from the audience to finish the show; Halpin would later be awarded Rolling Stone magazine's "Pick-Up Player of the Year Award" for his historic performance.
- date unknown
  - The Royal Northern College of Music is established by the merger of the Northern School of Music (established 1920) and the Royal Manchester College of Music (established 1893)
  - The Taverner Consort and Players are founded by Andrew Parrott.

== Number-one records ==
=== Singles ===
Date	Single	Artist
6 January	"Long Haired Lover from Liverpool"	Little Jimmy Osmond
13 January	"Long Haired Lover from Liverpool"	Little Jimmy Osmond
20 January	"Long Haired Lover from Liverpool"	Little Jimmy Osmond
27 January	"Block Buster!"	Sweet
3 February	"Block Buster!"	Sweet
10 February	"Block Buster!"	Sweet
17 February	"Block Buster!"	Sweet
24 February	"Block Buster!"	Sweet
3 March	"Cum On Feel the Noize"	Slade
10 March	"Cum On Feel the Noize"	Slade
17 March	"Cum On Feel the Noize"	Slade
24 March	"Cum On Feel the Noize"	Slade
31 March	"The Twelfth of Never"	Donny Osmond
7 April	"Get Down"	Gilbert O'Sullivan
14 April	"Get Down"	Gilbert O'Sullivan
21 April	"Tie a Yellow Ribbon Round the Ole Oak Tree"	Dawn
28 April	"Tie a Yellow Ribbon Round the Ole Oak Tree"	Dawn
5 May	"Tie a Yellow Ribbon Round the Ole Oak Tree"	Dawn
12 May	"Tie a Yellow Ribbon Round the Ole Oak Tree"	Dawn
19 May	"See My Baby Jive"	Wizzard
26 May	"See My Baby Jive"	Wizzard
2 June	"See My Baby Jive"	Wizzard
9 June	"See My Baby Jive"	Wizzard
16 June	"Can the Can"	Suzi Quatro
23 June	"Rubber Bullets"	10cc
30 June	"Skweeze Me Pleeze Me"	Slade
7 July	"Skweeze Me Pleeze Me"	Slade
14 July	"Skweeze Me Pleeze Me"	Slade
21 July	"Welcome Home"	Peters and Lee
28 July	"I'm the Leader of the Gang (I Am)"	Gary Glitter
4 August	"I'm the Leader of the Gang (I Am)"	Gary Glitter
11 August	"I'm the Leader of the Gang (I Am)"	Gary Glitter
18 August	"I'm the Leader of the Gang (I Am)"	Gary Glitter
25 August	"Young Love" / "A Million to One"	Donny Osmond
1 September	"Young Love" / "A Million to One"	Donny Osmond
8 September	"Young Love" / "A Million to One"	Donny Osmond
15 September	"Young Love" / "A Million to One"	Donny Osmond
22 September	"Angel Fingers"	Wizzard
29 September	"Eye Level"	Simon Park Orchestra
6 October	"Eye Level"	Simon Park Orchestra
13 October	"Eye Level"	Simon Park Orchestra
20 October	"Eye Level"	Simon Park Orchestra
27 October	"Daydreamer" / "The Puppy Song	David Cassidy
3 November	"Daydreamer" / "The Puppy Song	David Cassidy
10 November	"Daydreamer" / "The Puppy Song	David Cassidy
17 November	"I Love You Love Me Love"	Gary Glitter
24 November	"I Love You Love Me Love"	Gary Glitter
1 December	"I Love You Love Me Love"	Gary Glitter
8 December	"I Love You Love Me Love"	Gary Glitter
15 December	"Merry Xmas Everybody"	Slade
22 December	"Merry Xmas Everybody"	Slade
29 December	"Merry Xmas Everybody"	Slade

=== Albums ===
Date	Album	Artist
6 January	20 All Time Hits of the 50s	Various Artists
13 January	Slayed?	Slade
20 January	Back to Front	Gilbert O'Sullivan
27 January	Slayed?	Slade
3 February	Slayed?	Slade
10 February	Don't Shoot Me I'm Only the Piano Player	Elton John
17 February	Don't Shoot Me I'm Only the Piano Player	Elton John
24 February	Don't Shoot Me I'm Only the Piano Player	Elton John
3 March	Don't Shoot Me I'm Only the Piano Player	Elton John
10 March	Don't Shoot Me I'm Only the Piano Player	Elton John
17 March	Don't Shoot Me I'm Only the Piano Player	Elton John
24 March	Billion Dollar Babies	Alice Cooper
31 March	20 Flashback Greats of the Sixties	Various Artists
7 April	20 Flashback Greats of the Sixties	Various Artists
14 April	Houses of the Holy	Led Zeppelin
21 April	Houses of the Holy	Led Zeppelin
28 April	Ooh La La	The Faces
5 May	Aladdin Sane	David Bowie
12 May	Aladdin Sane	David Bowie
19 May	Aladdin Sane	David Bowie
26 May	Aladdin Sane	David Bowie
2 June	Aladdin Sane	David Bowie
9 June	Pure Gold	Various Artists
16 June	Pure Gold	Various Artists
23 June	Pure Gold	Various Artists
30 June	That'll Be the Day	Soundtrack
7 July	That'll Be the Day	Soundtrack
14 July	That'll Be the Day	Soundtrack
21 July	That'll Be the Day	Soundtrack
28 July	That'll Be the Day	Soundtrack
4 August	That'll Be the Day	Soundtrack
11 August	That'll Be the Day	Soundtrack
18 August	We Can Make It	Peters and Lee
25 August	We Can Make It	Peters and Lee
1 September	Sing It Again Rod	Rod Stewart
8 September	Sing It Again Rod	Rod Stewart
15 September	Sing It Again Rod	Rod Stewart
22 September	Goat's Head Soup	The Rolling Stones
29 September	Goat's Head Soup	The Rolling Stones
6 October	Sladest	Slade
13 October	Sladest	Slade
20 October	Sladest	Slade
27 October	Hello!	Status Quo
3 November	Pin Ups	David Bowie
10 November	Pin Ups	David Bowie
17 November	Pin Ups	David Bowie
24 November	Pin Ups	David Bowie
1 December	Pin Ups	David Bowie
8 December	Stranded	Roxy Music
15 December	Dreams Are Nuthin' More Than Wishes	David Cassidy
22 December	Goodbye Yellow Brick Road	Elton John
29 December	Goodbye Yellow Brick Road	Elton John

== Year-end charts ==
Between 2 January and 6 December 1973.

=== Best-selling singles ===
No.	Title	Artist	Peak position
1	"Tie a Yellow Ribbon Round the Ole Oak Tree"	Dawn featuring Tony Orlando	1
2	"Eye Level"	Simon Park Orchestra	1
3	"Welcome Home"	Peters and Lee	1
4	"Block Buster!"	Sweet	1
5	"Cum On Feel the Noize"	Slade	1
6	"See My Baby Jive"	Wizzard	1
7	"I'm the Leader of the Gang (I Am)"	Gary Glitter	1
8	"I Love You Love Me Love"	Gary Glitter	1
9	"The Twelfth of Never"	Donny Osmond	1
10	"Spanish Eyes"	Al Martino	5
11	"Daydreamer"/"The Puppy Song"	David Cassidy	1
12	"Long Haired Lover from Liverpool"	Little Jimmy Osmond	1
13	"Skweeze Me, Pleeze Me"	Slade	1
14	"And I Love You So"	Perry Como	3
15	"Hello, Hello, I'm Back Again"	Gary Glitter	2
16	"Get Down"	Gilbert O'Sullivan	1
17	"The Ballroom Blitz"	Sweet	2
18	"Do You Wanna Touch Me? (Oh Yeah!)"	Gary Glitter	2
19	"Young Love"	Donny Osmond	1
20	"Rubber Bullets"	10cc	1
21	"Monster Mash"	Bobby "Boris" Pickett and the Crypt Kickers	3
22	"For the Good Times"	Perry Como	7
23	"Dancin' (on a Saturday Night)"	Barry Blue	2
24	"Part of the Union"	Strawbs	2
25	"Angel Fingers (A Teen Ballad)"	Wizzard	1
26	"Life on Mars?"	David Bowie	3
27	"Hell Raiser"	Sweet	2
28	"Yesterday Once More"	The Carpenters	2
29	"Can the Can"	Suzi Quatro	1
30	"My Friend Stan"	Slade	2
31	"You're So Vain"	Carly Simon	3
32	"Albatross"	Fleetwood Mac	2 (Note: Reached number 1 in 1969)
33	"Rock On"	David Essex	3
34	"Nutbush City Limits"	Ike & Tina Turner	4
35	"Alright, Alright, Alright"	Mungo Jerry	3
36	"Sorrow"	David Bowie	3
37	"One and One Is One"	Medicine Head	3
38	"You Can Do Magic"	Limmie & the Family Cooking	3
39	"Let Me In"	The Osmonds	2
40	"The Jean Genie"	David Bowie	2
41	"Caroline"	Status Quo	5
42	"The Laughing Gnome"	David Bowie	6
43	"Feel the Need in Me"	The Detroit Emeralds	4
44	"My Coo Ca Choo"	Alvin Stardust	2
45	"Power to All Our Friends"	Cliff Richard	4
46	"Never Never Never (Grande Grande Grande)"	Shirley Bassey	8
47	"20th Century Boy"	T. Rex	3
48	"Snoopy vs. the Red Baron"	The Hotshots	4
49	"I Am a Clown"/"Some Kind of Summer"	David Cassidy	3
50	"Paper Roses"	Marie Osmond	2

=== Best-selling albums ===
The list of the top fifty best-selling albums of 1973 were published in Record Mirror at the end of the year, and later reproduced in the first edition of the BPI Year Book in 1976. However, in 2007 the Official Charts Company published album chart histories for each year from 1956 to 1977, researched by historian Sharon Mawer, and included an updated list of the top ten best-selling albums for each year based on the new research. The updated top ten for 1973 is shown in the table below. The most significant changes from the original BMRB chart were that the album previously thought to be the year's best-seller, the soundtrack to the film That'll Be the Day, fell to tenth position, and Don't Shoot Me I'm Only the Piano Player by Elton John moved up from number four to become the new best-selling album of 1973.

No.	Title	Artist	Peak position
1	Don't Shoot Me I'm Only the Piano Player	Elton John	1
2	Aladdin Sane	David Bowie	1
3	Greatest Hits	Simon & Garfunkel	3 (Note: Reached number 2 in 1972)
4	The Dark Side of the Moon	Pink Floyd	2
5	We Can Make It	Peters and Lee	1
6	1967–1970	The Beatles	2
7	1962–1966	The Beatles	3
8	And I Love You So	Perry Como	3 (Note: Reached number 1 in 1974)
9	Back to Front	Gilbert O'Sullivan	1
10	That'll Be the Day	Original Soundtrack	1

== Classical music: new works ==
- Malcolm Arnold – Symphony No. 7
- Jeffrey Lewis – Aurora
- William Mathias – Missa Brevis
- Nicholas Maw – Life Studies
- Patric Standford – Christus Requiem
- Michael Tippett – Piano Sonata No. 3
- Grace Williams – Ave Maris Stella

== Opera ==
- Benjamin Britten – Death in Venice

== Film and incidental music ==
- John Barry – A Doll's House, starring Claire Bloom, Anthony Hopkins, Ralph Richardson and Denholm Elliott.
- Richard Rodney Bennett – Lady Caroline Lamb directed by Robert Bolt, starring Sarah Miles.
- Albert Elms – Love Thy Neighbour.
- Paul Ferris – The Creeping Flesh directed by Freddie Francis, starring Peter Cushing and Christopher Lee.

== Musical theatre ==
- 13 May – Cyrano, with book and lyrics by Anthony Burgess and music by Michael J. Lewis, opens at the Palace Theatre, London, starring Christopher Plummer; it runs for 49 performances.

== Musical films ==
- Jesus Christ Superstar, a film adaptation of the Andrew Lloyd Webber/Tim Rice rock opera, directed by Norman Jewison

== Births ==
- 11 January – Tom Gladwin, bassist (Shed Seven)
- 25 January – Chris Wilkie, guitarist (Dubstar)
- 3 March – Matthew Marsden, actor and singer
- 13 March – Eloy de Jong, Dutch-born singer (Caught in the Act)
- 22 March – Beverley Knight, soul singer
- 14 May
  - Sinéad O'Carroll, Irish singer (B*Witched)
  - Natalie Appleton, Canadian-born singer (All Saints)
- 21 May – Noel Fielding, comedian and musician
- 23 May – Nikki Yeoh, jazz pianist
- 29 May – Tansy Davies, composer
- 6 July – Paul Banks, guitarist (Shed Seven)
- 16 July – Schelim Hannan, singer (Worlds Apart)
- 19 July – Martin Powell, keyboard player and songwriter (Cradle of Filth, My Dying Bride, Cryptal Darkness, and Anathema)
- 22 July – Daniel Jones, English-Australian guitarist, songwriter, and producer
- 23 July – Fran Healy, singer-songwriter (Travis)
- 10 August – Jon O'Mahony, drummer (Ultra)
- 21 August – Ally Begg, singer (Bad Boys Inc)
- 30 August – Leon Caffrey, drummer (Space)
- 17 September – Amy Black, operatic mezzo-soprano (died 2009)
- 27 September – Lee Brennan, singer (911)
- 29 September – Alfie Boe, operatic tenor
- 9 October – Cal Cooper, singer (Worlds Apart)
- 10 October – Scott Morriss, bassist (The Bluetones)
- 10 November – Jacqui Abbott, vocalist (The Beautiful South)
- 4 December – Naima Belkhiati, singer (Honeyz)
- date unknown – Andrew March, composer

== Deaths ==
- 3 February – Edward Lockspeiser, musicologist, composer and radio broadcaster, 67
- 26 March – Noël Coward, composer and dramatist, 73
- 18 April – Ronald Center, composer, 60
- 24 May – Sid Phillips, jazz clarinetist, bandleader, and arranger, 65
- 8 June – Tubby Hayes, jazz musician, 38 (during heart surgery)
- 9 August – Donald Peers, singer, 66
- 16 August – Astra Desmond, contralto, 80
- 6 September – Sir William Henry Harris, composer, 90
- 22 October – David Franklin, opera singer and broadcaster, 65
- 27 October – Norman Allin, operatic bass, 88
- 26 November – John Rostill, bassist and composer, 31 (electrocuted by faulty guitar equipment)
- 6 December – Frederic Curzon, composer and conductor, 74
- 17 December – Patrick Hadley, composer, 74
- date unknown – Harry Dexter, music critic and composer of light music, 63

== See also ==
- 1973 in British radio
- 1973 in British television
- 1973 in the United Kingdom
- List of British films of 1973
