= List of Melody Maker number-one singles of the 1970s =

Melody Maker was a British weekly pop music newspaper which was published from 1926 to 2000. Record charts in the United Kingdom began life on 14 November 1952 when NME (New Musical Express) began compiling the first UK-wide sales-based hit parade. Melody Maker's own chart began on 7 April 1956. Prior to 15 February 1969, when the British Market Research Bureau chart was established, there was no one universally accepted source and many periodicals compiled their own chart. During this time the BBC used aggregated results of charts from the NME and other sources to compile the Pick of the Pops chart. In 1969, Record Retailer and the BBC commissioned the British Market Research Bureau (BMRB) to compile the singles chart.

Prior to this, The Official Charts Company and Guinness' British Hit Singles & Albums, consider Record Retailer the canonical source for the British singles chart in the 1960s; While NME had the biggest circulation of charts in the 1960s and was more widely followed, Melody Maker's chart was considered more influential and equally highly cited. After 1969, the joint venture between Record Retailer and the BBC is widely considered as the beginning of the official UK Singles Chart. Melody Maker, like NME, continued compiling its own chart until 14 May 1988.

Notable differences in the Melody Maker charts in this decade when compared to the official chart run by BMRB and even NME are additional number-one singles for Gary Glitter, Queen, Showaddywaddy, Wings, The Real Thing, David Soul, John Travolta and The Jam. Such songs as "Boogie Nights" by Heatwave and "Ain't Gonna Bump No More (With No Big Fat Woman)" by Joe Tex reached the top of the Melody Maker chart although neither topped the BMRB or NME charts. Twenty-two acts achieved a number-one single on the Melody Maker chart but never had an official number-one single, (Note: La Belle Epoque, Barry Blue, The Carpenters, Tony Christie, Elvis Costello, Deep Purple, Don Fardon, Free, Bobby Goldsboro, Heatwave, Jean-Michel Jarre, Janet Kay, M, Manuel and the Music of the Mountains, McGuinness Flint, Ralph McTell, Marie Osmond, Minnie Riperton, Rose Royce, Space, R. Dean Taylor, and Joe Tex never had an official number-one single; in addition, La Belle Epoque, Blue, Fardon, Heatwave, Jarre, Manuel, Osmond, Rose Royce, Taylor, and Tex never had a number-one single on the NME charts.) although one of them was part of a singing duo whose other half had reached number one solo. (Note: Marie Osmond's brother and singing partner Donny Osmond had a number-one single in 1972 with "Puppy Love.")

During the 1970s, Melody Maker charted 201 number-one singles, of which 49 did not make the top of the official UK Singles Chart. Of that figure, 18 singles also did not reach number one on the NME charts. One of the standouts in Melody Maker's unique number ones of the 1970s was "Rodrigo's Guitar Concerto de Aranjuez (Theme From 2nd Movement)" by Manuel and the Music of the Mountains (pseudonym of veteran arranger/conductor Geoff Love), which was number one for one week in February 1976. The BBC, which drew their charts from the BMRB, had announced this as the number one single in the United Kingdom, but the chart was withdrawn four hours later due to compilation errors, making it the shortest period that a song had been number one on the official charts. Melody Maker thus had this at number one for six days and twenty hours longer than the BBC.

== Number-one singles ==
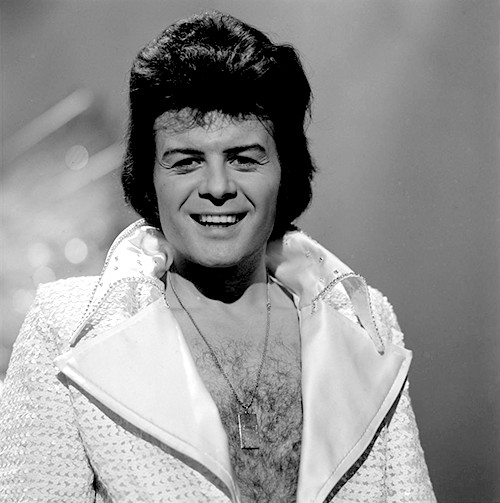
Gary Glitter had a total of five number ones in Melody Maker - with his first and last not recognised by the Official Charts Company.

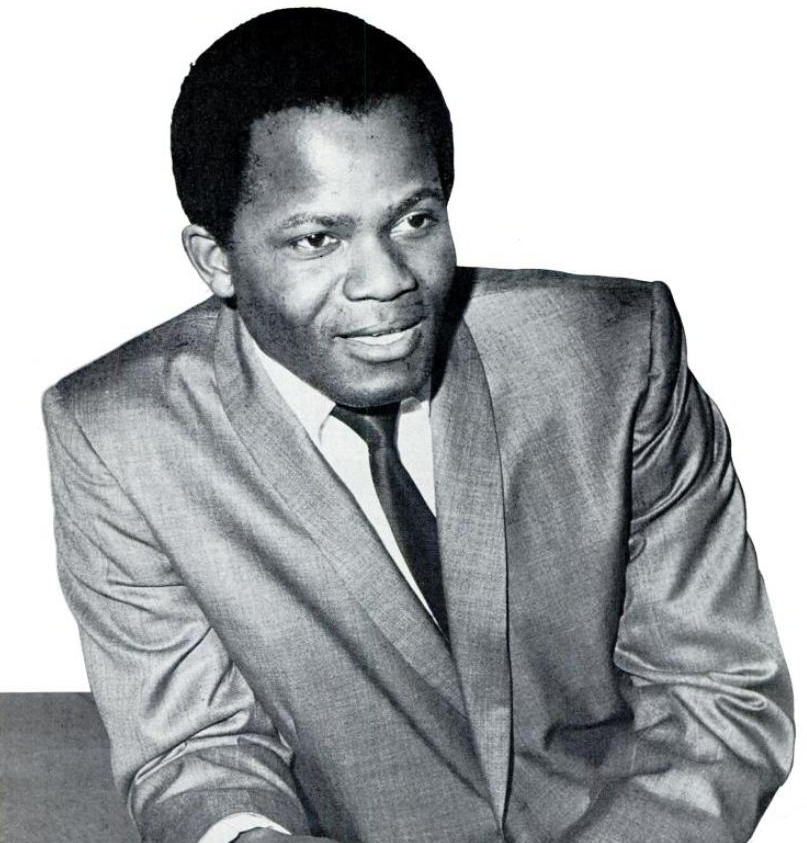
Joe Tex had his only pop number one in Melody Maker with "Ain't Gonna Bump No More (With No Big Fat Woman).".

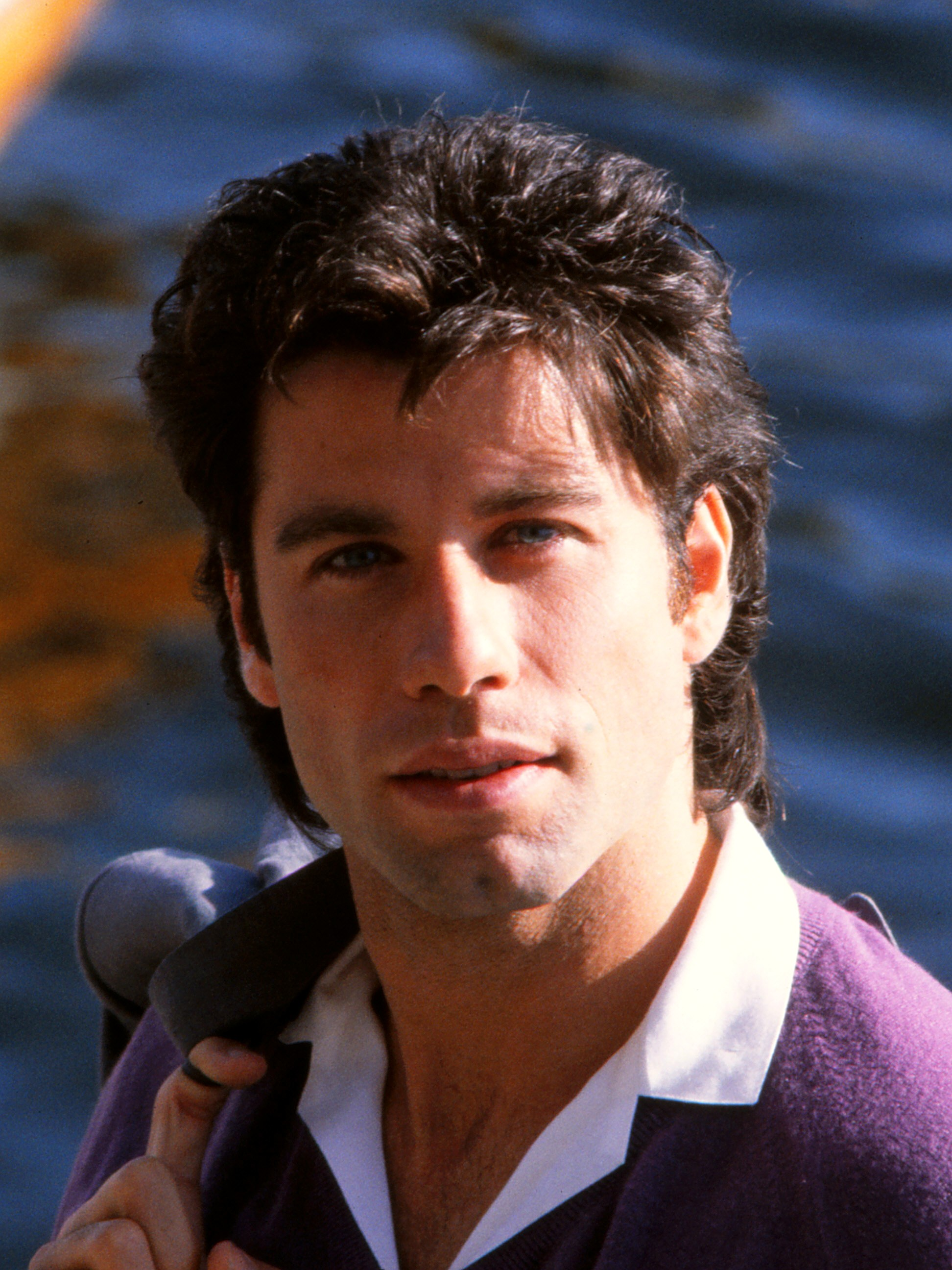
John Travolta had his only solo number-one when "Sandy" topped the Melody Maker chart.

Key
‡	The song did not reach number one on the BMRB chart which is considered as the official chart after 15 February 1969.
[nb #]	The song spent a week at number one where it shared the top spot with another song.

No.	Artist (Note: The names, singles, dates and duration of the number-ones are from Melody Maker."Melody Maker Singles Charts 1970's". UKMix.)	Single	Reached number one	Weeks at number one
1970
226	Rolf Harris	"Two Little Boys"	20 December 1969	6
227	Marmalade	"Reflections of My Life" ‡	31 January 1970	1
228	Edison Lighthouse	"Love Grows (Where My Rosemary Goes)"	7 February 1970	3
229	The Jackson 5	"I Want You Back" ‡	28 February 1970	1
230	Lee Marvin	"Wand'rin' Star"	7 March 1970	3
231	Simon & Garfunkel	"Bridge over Troubled Water"	28 March 1970	4
232	Norman Greenbaum	"Spirit in the Sky"	25 April 1970	4
233	England World Cup Squad "70"	"Back Home"	23 May 1970	1
234	Christie	"Yellow River"	30 May 1970	3
235	Mungo Jerry	"In the Summertime"	20 June 1970	4
236	Free	"All Right Now" ‡	18 July 1970	3
237	Elvis Presley	"The Wonder of You"	8 August 1970	5
238	Smokey Robinson and The Miracles	"The Tears of a Clown"	12 September 1970	2
239	Freda Payne	"Band of Gold"	26 September 1970	5
240	Deep Purple	"Black Night" ‡	31 October 1970	1
241	Matthews' Southern Comfort	"Woodstock"	7 November 1970	3
242	Don Fardon	"Indian Reservation" ‡	28 November 1970	1
243	Dave Edmunds	"I Hear You Knocking"	5 December 1970	2
244	McGuinness Flint	"When I'm Dead and Gone" ‡	19 December 1970	3
1971
245	Clive Dunn	"Grandad"	9 January 1971	3
246	George Harrison	"My Sweet Lord"	30 January 1971	7
247	Mungo Jerry	"Baby Jump"	20 March 1971	1
248	T. Rex	"Hot Love"	27 March 1971	5 (Note: T. Rex' "Hot Love" and Dave and Ansel Collins' "Double Barrel" were classified jointly as number one on 1 May 1971. For the previous five weeks "Hot Love" had held the number-one spot individually, and the following week "Double Barrel" was number one outright.)
249	Dave and Ansel Collins	"Double Barrel"	1 May 1971	2
250	Dawn	"Knock Three Times"	15 May 1971	5
251	Tony Christie	"I Did What I Did for Maria" ‡	19 June 1971	1
252	Middle of the Road	"Chirpy Chirpy Cheep Cheep"	26 June 1971	5
253	T. Rex	"Get It On"	31 July 1971	3
254	The New Seekers	"Never Ending Song of Love" ‡	21 August 1971	1 (Note: The New Seekers' "Never Ending Song of Love" and Diana Ross' "I'm Still Waiting" were classified jointly as number one on 21 August 1971. The following week, "Never Ending Song of Love" claimed the number-one spot outright, and "I'm Still Waiting" was number one for two weeks after that.)
255	Diana Ross	"I'm Still Waiting"	21 August 1971	1
re	The New Seekers	"Never Ending Song of Love" ‡	28 August 1971	1
re	Diana Ross	"I'm Still Waiting"	4 September 1971	2
256	The Tams	"Hey Girl Don't Bother Me"	18 September 1971	3
257	Rod Stewart	"Reason to Believe" / "Maggie May"	9 October 1971	6
258	Slade	"Coz I Luv You"	20 November 1971	3
259	Benny Hill	"Ernie (The Fastest Milkman in the West)"	11 December 1971	5
1972
260	The New Seekers	"I'd Like to Teach the World to Sing (In Perfect Harmony)"	15 January 1972	4
261	T. Rex	"Telegram Sam"	12 February 1972	2
262	Chicory Tip	"Son of My Father"	26 February 1972	2
263	Don McLean	"American Pie" ‡	11 March 1972	1
264	Nilsson	"Without You"	18 March 1972	5
265	Royal Scots Dragoon Guards	"Amazing Grace"	22 April 1972	5
266	T. Rex	"Metal Guru"	27 May 1972	3
267	Don McLean	"Vincent"	17 June 1972	3
268	Gary Glitter	"Rock and Roll Parts 1 & 2" ‡	8 July 1972	1
269	Donny Osmond	"Puppy Love"	15 July 1972	4
270	Alice Cooper	"School's Out"	12 August 1972	3
271	Rod Stewart	"You Wear It Well"	2 September 1972	2
272	Slade	"Mama Weer All Crazee Now"	16 September 1972	2
273	T. Rex	"Children of the Revolution" ‡	30 September 1972	1
274	David Cassidy	"How Can I Be Sure"	7 October 1972	1
275	Lieutenant Pigeon	"Mouldy Ol' Dough"	14 October 1972	5
276	Gilbert O'Sullivan	"Clair"	18 November 1972	2
277	Chuck Berry	"My Ding-a-Ling"	2 December 1972	5
1973
278	Little Jimmy Osmond	"Long Haired Lover from Liverpool"	6 January 1973	2
279	David Bowie	"The Jean Genie" ‡	20 January 1973	1
280	Sweet	"Blockbuster"	27 January 1973	4
281	Strawbs	"Part of the Union" ‡	24 February 1973	2
282	Slade	"Cum On Feel the Noize"	10 March 1973	3
283	Donny Osmond	"The Twelfth of Never"	31 March 1973	2
284	Gilbert O'Sullivan	"Get Down"	14 April 1973	1
285	Dawn featuring Tony Orlando	"Tie a Yellow Ribbon Round the Ole Oak Tree"	21 April 1973	4 (Note: Dawn featuring Tony Orlando's "Tie a Yellow Ribbon Round the Ole Oak Tree" and Wizzard's "See My Baby Jive" were classified jointly as number one on 19 May 1973. For the previous four weeks "Tie a Yellow Ribbon" had been number one outright, and for the following two weeks "See My Baby Jive" claimed the number-one spot individually.)
286	Wizzard	"See My Baby Jive"	19 May 1973	3
287	Suzi Quatro	"Can the Can"	9 June 1973	3
288	10.CC	"Rubber Bullets"	30 June 1973	1
289	Slade	"Skweeze Me, Pleeze Me"	7 July 1973	2
290	Peters and Lee	"Welcome Home"	21 July 1973	1
291	Gary Glitter	"I'm the Leader of the Gang (I Am!)"	28 July 1973	3
292	The Carpenters	"Yesterday Once More" ‡	18 August 1973	3
293	Donny Osmond	"Young Love"	8 September 1973	1
294	Barry Blue	"Dancing on a Saturday Night" ‡	15 September 1973	1
295	Wizzard	"Angel Fingers (A Teen Ballad)"	22 September 1973	1
296	Sweet	"The Ballroom Blitz" ‡	29 September 1973	1
297	Simon Park Orchestra	"Eye Level (Theme From The Thames TV Series "Van Der Valk")"	6 October 1973	4
298	David Cassidy	"The Puppy Song" / "Daydreamer"	3 November 1973	2
299	Gary Glitter	"I Love, You Love, Me Love"	24 November 1973	4
300	Slade	"Merry Xmas Everybody"	22 December 1973	3
1974
301	Leo Sayer	"The Show Must Go On" ‡	12 January 1974	3
302	Mud	"Tiger Feet"	2 February 1974	3
303	Suzi Quatro	"Devil Gate Drive"	23 February 1974	3
304	Alvin Stardust	"Jealous Mind"	16 March 1974	1
305	Paper Lace	"Billy Don't Be a Hero"	23 March 1974	3
306	Terry Jacks	"Seasons in the Sun"	13 April 1974	2
307	Mud	"The Cat Crept In" ‡	27 April 1974	1
308	ABBA	"Waterloo"	4 May 1974	3
309	The Rubettes	"Sugar Baby Love"	25 May 1974	2
310	R. Dean Taylor	"There's a Ghost in My House" ‡	8 June 1974	1
311	Showaddywaddy	"Hey Rock and Roll" ‡	15 June 1974	1
312	Ray Stevens	"The Streak"	22 June 1974	1
313	Gary Glitter	"Always Yours"	29 June 1974	1
314	Charles Aznavour	"She"	6 July 1974	4
315	George McCrae	"Rock Your Baby"	3 August 1974	2
316	The Three Degrees	"When Will I See You Again"	17 August 1974	3
317	Donny and Marie Osmond	"I'm Leaving It All Up to You" ‡	7 September 1974	1
318	The Osmonds	"Love Me for a Reason"	14 September 1974	1
319	Carl Douglas	"Kung Fu Fighting"	21 September 1974	2
320	John Denver	"Annie's Song"	5 October 1974	1
321	Sweet Sensation	"Sad Sweet Dreamer"	12 October 1974	2
322	Ken Boothe	"Everything I Own"	26 October 1974	3
323	Queen	"Killer Queen" ‡	16 November 1974	2
324	David Essex	"I'm Gonna Make You a Star"	30 November 1974	1
325	Gary Glitter	"Oh Yes, You're Beautiful" ‡	7 December 1974	1
326	Barry White	"You're the First, the Last, My Everything"	14 December 1974	1
327	Mud	"Lonely This Christmas"	21 December 1974	3
1975
328	Status Quo	"Down Down"	11 January 1975	1
329	Ralph McTell	"Streets of London" ‡	18 January 1975	1
330	The Tymes	"Ms Grace"	25 January 1975	2
331	Pilot	"January"	8 February 1975	2
332	Steve Harley & Cockney Rebel	"Come Up And See Me – Make Me Smile"	22 February 1975	2
333	Telly Savalas	"If"	8 March 1975	2
334	Bay City Rollers	"Bye Bye Baby"	22 March 1975	6
335	Bobby Goldsboro	"Honey" ‡	3 May 1975	1
336	Minnie Riperton	"Lovin' You" ‡	10 May 1975	2
337	Tammy Wynette	"Stand by Your Man"	24 May 1975	3
338	Windsor Davies and Don Estelle	"Whispering Grass"	14 June 1975	2
339	10.CC	"I'm Not in Love"	28 June 1975	3
340	Johnny Nash	"Tears on My Pillow"	19 July 1975	1
341	Bay City Rollers	"Give a Little Love"	26 July 1975	1
342	Typically Tropical	"Barbados"	2 August 1975	2
343	The Stylistics	"Can't Give You Anything (But My Love)"	16 August 1975	3
344	Rod Stewart	"Sailing"	6 September 1975	4
345	David Essex	"Hold Me Close"	4 October 1975	2
346	Art Garfunkel	"I Only Have Eyes for You"	18 October 1975	1
re	David Essex	"Hold Me Close"	25 October 1975	1
347	David Bowie	"Space Oddity"	1 November 1975	4
348	Hot Chocolate	"You Sexy Thing" ‡	29 November 1975	1
349	Queen	"Bohemian Rhapsody"	6 December 1975	7
1976
350	ABBA	"Mamma Mia"	24 January 1976	3
351	Slik	"Forever and Ever"	14 February 1976	2
352	Manuel and the Music of the Mountains	"Rodrigo's Guitar Concerto de Aranjuez" ‡	28 February 1976	1
353	Tina Charles	"I Love to Love (But My Baby Loves to Dance)"	6 March 1976	4
354	Brotherhood of Man	"Save All Your Kisses for Me"	3 April 1976	4
355	ABBA	"Fernando"	1 May 1976	5
356	J. J. Barrie	"No Charge"	5 June 1976	1
357	Wurzels	"Combine Harvester"	12 June 1976	1
358	Real Thing	"You to Me Are Everything"	19 June 1976	3
359	Candi Staton	"Young Hearts Run Free" ‡	10 July 1976	2
360	Demis Roussos	"The Roussos Phenomenon (E.P.)"	24 July 1976	1
361	Elton John & Kiki Dee	"Don't Go Breaking My Heart"	31 July 1976	5
362	Wings	"Let 'Em In" ‡	4 September 1976	1
363	ABBA	"Dancing Queen"	11 September 1976	3
364	Real Thing	"Can't Get By Without You" ‡	2 October 1976	1
re	ABBA	"Dancing Queen"	9 October 1976	1
365	Pussycat	"Mississippi"	16 October 1976	2
366	Chicago	"If You Leave Me Now"	30 October 1976	6
367	Showaddywaddy	"Under the Moon of Love"	11 December 1976	2
368	Johnny Mathis	"When a Child Is Born"	25 December 1976	3
1977
re	Showaddywaddy	"Under the Moon of Love"	15 January 1977	1
369	David Soul	"Don't Give Up on Us"	22 January 1977	1
370	Julie Covington	"Don't Cry for Me Argentina"	29 January 1977	2
371	Leo Sayer	"When I Need You"	12 February 1977	4
372	Heatwave	"Boogie Nights" ‡	12 March 1977	1
373	The Manhattan Transfer	"Chanson D'Amour"	19 March 1977	2
374	ABBA	"Knowing Me, Knowing You"	2 April 1977	1
375	David Soul	"Going In With My Eyes Open" ‡	9 April 1977	2
re	ABBA	"Knowing Me, Knowing You"	16 April 1977	3
376	Deniece Williams	"Free"	7 May 1977	1
377	Rod Stewart	"I Don't Want to Talk About It" / "The First Cut Is the Deepest"	14 May 1977	3
378	Joe Tex	"Ain't Gonna Bump No More (With No Big Fat Woman)" ‡	4 June 1977	1
re	Rod Stewart	"I Don't Want to Talk About It" / "The First Cut Is the Deepest"	11 June 1977	2
379	The Jacksons	"Show You the Way to Go"	25 June 1977	2
380	Hot Chocolate	"So You Win Again"	9 July 1977	2
381	Donna Summer	"I Feel Love"	23 July 1977	5
382	The Floaters	"Float On"	27 August 1977	2
383	Space	"Magic Fly" ‡	10 September 1977	2
384	Jean-Michel Jarre	"Oxygène (Part IV)" ‡	24 September 1977	1
re	Space	"Magic Fly" ‡	1 October 1977	1
385	Elvis Presley	"Way Down"	8 October 1977	1
386	La Belle Epoque	"Black Is Black" ‡	15 October 1977	2
387	Rod Stewart	"You're in My Heart" ‡	29 October 1977	2
388	ABBA	"The Name of the Game"	12 November 1977	2
389	Status Quo	"Rockin' All Over the World" ‡	26 November 1977	1
390	Wings	"Mull of Kintyre"	3 December 1977	8
1978
391	Althea & Donna	"Uptown Top Ranking"	28 January 1978	3
392	ABBA	"Take a Chance on Me"	18 February 1978	3
393	Rose Royce	"Wishing on a Star" ‡	11 March 1978	1
394	Kate Bush	"Wuthering Heights"	18 March 1978	1
395	Blondie	"Denis" ‡	25 March 1978	3
396	Showaddywaddy	"I Wonder Why" ‡	15 April 1978	2
397	Bee Gees	"Night Fever"	29 April 1978	3
398	Boney M.	"Rivers of Babylon"	20 May 1978	4
399	John Travolta and Olivia Newton-John	"You're the One That I Want"	17 June 1978	9
400	Commodores	"Three Times a Lady"	19 August 1978	6
401	John Travolta and Olivia Newton-John	"Summer Nights"	30 September 1978	6
402	John Travolta	"Sandy" ‡	11 November 1978	1
403	The Boomtown Rats	"Rat Trap"	18 November 1978	2
404	Rod Stewart	"Da Ya Think I'm Sexy?"	2 December 1978	2
405	Boney M.	"Mary's Boy Child – Oh My Lord"	16 December 1978	4
1979
406	Village People	"Y.M.C.A."	13 January 1979	1
407	Ian Dury	"Hit Me with Your Rhythm Stick"	20 January 1979	2
408	Blondie	"Heart of Glass"	3 February 1979	4
409	Bee Gees	"Tragedy"	3 March 1979	1
410	Elvis Costello	"Olivers Army" ‡	10 March 1979	1
411	Gloria Gaynor	"I Will Survive"	17 March 1979	4
412	Art Garfunkel	"Bright Eyes"	14 April 1979	5
413	M	"Pop Muzik" ‡	19 May 1979	1
414	Roxy Music	"Dance Away" ‡	26 May 1979	1
415	Blondie	"Sunday Girl"	2 June 1979	2
416	Anita Ward	"Ring My Bell"	16 June 1979	2
417	Tubeway Army	"Are Friends Electric?"	30 June 1979	3
418	Janet Kay	"Silly Games" ‡	21 July 1979	1
419	The Boomtown Rats	"I Don't Like Mondays"	28 July 1979	5
420	Cliff Richard	"We Don't Talk Anymore"	1 September 1979	3
421	Gary Numan	"Cars"	22 September 1979	2
422	The Police	"Message in a Bottle"	6 October 1979	2
423	The Buggles	"Video Killed the Radio Star"	20 October 1979	2
424	Dr. Hook	"When You're in Love with a Beautiful Woman"	3 November 1979	2
425	The Jam	"The Eton Rifles" ‡	17 November 1979	3
426	The Police	"Walking on the Moon"	8 December 1979	2
427	Pink Floyd	"Another Brick in the Wall (Part II)"	22 December 1979	4
