= Wizzard Brew =

Studio album by Wizzard
- Released: March 1973; 2006 Re-Issue
- Recorded: 1972–1973
- Studio: Phonogram (London, UK); EMI (London, UK)
- Genre: Glam rock; rock and roll; art rock
- Length: 40:31
- Label: Harvest
- Producer: Roy Wood

Wizzard chronology
Wizzard Brew (1973)	Introducing Eddy and the Falcons (1974)

Alternative cover
- US alternative cover

Wizzard Brew is the debut album by rock group Wizzard, released in 1973 on EMI's Harvest label. It reached a peak of No. 29 in the UK Albums Chart. In the United States, it was released by United Artists Records as Wizzard's Brew (with a different cover photo) but failed to chart there.

In 2003, Mojo magazine ranked it number 18 on its list of the "Top 50 Eccentric Albums".

== Release ==
The original release included an insert with song lyrics on one side and photos of the band members on the other. It was reissued on CD in 1999 but was soon deleted. An expanded remastered edition, which includes all the A-sides and B-sides of the group's first four singles from 1972–1973 as bonus tracks, was released on CD in November 2006.

Wizzard Brew is a very eccentric album, starting with a typical heavy glam rock song lasting 4:36 on the first track, but then moving to an eclectic mixture of all sorts of sound lasting a marathon 13:30 on the second track, which includes jazz elements and a long period of duelling saxophones. The third track, lasting a short 2:08, is a sergeant major style military march, before then moving on to fast paced rock and roll on the fourth and fifth tracks, with the fifth track reminiscent of Elvis Presley sound. The sixth track, lasting 9:10, written originally for the second Electric Light Orchestra album shortly before Wood left the group, slows the pace down and mixes rock, pop melody, classical music and a verse of "Abide with Me" as the final lyrics.

== Reception ==
Stephen Thomas Erlewine, in a retrospective review for AllMusic, felt that Roy Wood differentiated between the accessibility of Wizzard's singles and the "real art" of Wizzard Brew.

Wood frequently used ring modulation to give the instruments a harsh, distorted sound. Critical and popular reaction was mixed.

== Track listing ==
All songs written by Roy Wood, except where noted

1. "You Can Dance Your Rock 'n' Roll" – 4:36
2. "Meet Me at the Jailhouse" – 13:30
3. "Jolly Cup of Tea" – 2:08
4. "Buffalo Station - Get On Down to Memphis" – 7:30
5. "Gotta Crush (About You)" – 3:37
6. "Wear a Fast Gun" – 9:10

=== 2006 bonus tracks ===
7. "Ball Park Incident" ('A') - 3:42
8. "The Carlsberg Special (Pianos Demolished Phone 021 373 4472)" (Bill Hunt) ('B') - 4:16
9. "See My Baby Jive" ('A') - 5:01
10. "Bend Over Beethoven" - (Hugh McDowell) ('B') - 4:42
11. "Angel Fingers" ('A') - 4:39
12. "You Got the Jump on Me" - (Rick Price) ('B') - 6:28
13. "Rob Roy's Nightmare (A Bit More H.A.)" - (Mike Burney) ('B') - 3:47
14. "I Wish It Could Be Christmas Everyday" ('A') - 4:48

=== iTunes bonus track ===
14. "Meet Me at the Jailhouse" (US Insert) - 0:47
  - Included as a hidden track after "I Wish It Could Be Christmas Everyday" on the CD reissues.

== Personnel ==
- Roy Wood – vocals, electric and acoustic guitars, sitar, cello, bassoon, baritone saxophone, double bass, B-flat bass tuba, trombone, recorders, percussion
- Rick Price – bass guitar, vocals, percussion
- Bill Hunt – piano, harpsichord, French horn, trumpet, flugelhorn, tenor horn, bugle, euphonium, E flat tuba, glass trumpet, backing vocals
- Hugh 'H' McDowell – cello, Moog synthesizer
- Nick Pentelow – tenor saxophone, clarinet, flute, bass backing vocals
- Mike Burney – alto, tenor, baritone and synthesized saxophones; clarinet, flute
- Keith Smart – drums
- Charlie Grima – drums, congas, percussion
- The Cowbag Choir

== Charts ==
Chart (1973)	Peak position
Australia (Kent Music Report)	50
United Kingdom (Official Charts Company)	29
