= Ball Park Incident =

Single by Wizzard
- B-side: "The Carlsberg Special (Piano's Demolished Phone 021 373 4472)"
- Released: November 1972
- Recorded: 1972
- Genre: Glam rock
- Length: 3:42
- Label: Harvest
- Songwriter: Roy Wood
- Producer: Roy Wood

Wizzard singles chronology
"Ball Park Incident" (1972)	"See My Baby Jive" (1973)

Official Audio
- "Ball Park Incident" (2006 remaster on YouTube

"Ball Park Incident" is a song written by Roy Wood. A version, produced by Wood, was recorded in 1972 by his glam rock band Wizzard and released that November as their debut single, on the Harvest label. It was in the Top 40 of the UK singles chart for ten weeks, and stood at its highest position of number six for three weeks in January 1973. The single also reached number one on the Dutch Top 40.

The band mimed performances of the song on BBC TV's Top of the Pops, first on 21 December 1972 and then again on 11 January 1973. Both performances have been wiped.

"Ball Park Incident" appears as a bonus track on the 2006 reissue of Wizzard's debut album Wizzard Brew.

== Personnel ==
- Roy Wood – vocal, electric and acoustic guitars, sitar, cello, bassoon, baritone saxophone, string bass, B-flat bass tuba, trombone, recorders, percussion
- Rick Price – bass guitar, vocals, percussion
- Bill Hunt – piano, harpsichord, French horn, trumpet, flugelhorn, tenor horn, bugle, euphonium, E flat tuba, little glass, backing vocals
- Hugh 'H' McDowell – cello and ARP synthesiser
- Nick Pentelow – tenor saxophone, clarinet and flute; bass backing vocals
- Mike Burney – alto, tenor, baritone & synthesized saxes, clarinet and flute
- Keith Smart – drums
- Charlie Grima – drums, congas, percussion

== Chart history ==
Chart (1973)	Position
Australian Singles Chart	6
Irish Singles Chart	8
Dutch Top 40	1
UK Singles Chart	6
