= Stockland Green School =

Coordinates: 52.5227°N 1.8618°W

Location
- Slade Road; Stockland Green; Birmingham, West Midlands, B23 7JH; England

Information
- Type: Academy
- Local authority: Birmingham City Council
- Department for Education URN: 138137 Tables
- Ofsted: Reports
- Headteacher: Rebecca Goode
- Gender: Mixed
- Age: 11 to 16
- Enrolment: 711 as of March 2016
- Website: https://stockgrn.bham.sch.uk//

Stockland Green School is a mixed secondary school located in the Stockland Green area of Birmingham, in the West Midlands of England.

Previously a community school administered by Birmingham City Council, Stockland Green School converted to academy status in May 2012. The school is now part of the Arthur Terry Learning Partnership, but continues to coordinate with Birmingham City Council for admissions.

The school was founded in the 1950s as a 'secondary modern' school catering for pupils who had not passed the eleven-plus exam for admission to a selective school. In the 1960s, a new wing was built and the school became a 'bilateral' school with a specialism in art. In its early years the school had a strong musical tradition; it had a good brass band and staged ambitious musicals such as 'White Horse Inn'.

In 1973 first year pupils from the then named Stockland Green Bilateral School sang the original backing vocals on the hit single I Wish It Could Be Christmas Everyday by Wizzard, though they were replaced when it was re-recorded in 1981.
