= Introducing Eddy and the Falcons =

Studio album by Wizzard
- Released: August 1974
- Recorded: 1973–1974
- Studio: Phonogram Studios, AIR and De Lane Lea Studios, London
- Genre: Rock and roll
- Length: 35:19
- Label: Warner Bros., United Artists
- Producer: Roy Wood

Wizzard chronology
Wizzard Brew (1973)	Introducing Eddy and the Falcons (1974)	Main Street (2000)

Singles from Introducing Eddy and the Falcons
- 1. "This Is the Story of My Love (Baby)" Released: 1974

Professional ratings
Review scores
Source	Rating
AllMusic	3/5 stars
Christgau's Record Guide	B−
Tom Hull	B+

Introducing Eddy and the Falcons is the second album by the English rock band Wizzard.

== History ==
The album had a concept similar to The Beatles' Sgt. Pepper's Lonely Hearts Club Band, in that the intro 'featured' the appearance on stage of fictional band Eddy & The Falcons. All tracks were written and recorded as tributes to 1950s and early 1960s rock and roll musicians, "Eddy’s Rock" being a guitar and saxophone instrumental played in the style of Duane Eddy, while "Everyday I Wonder" was similar in sound and approach to Del Shannon's "Runaway", and "Come Back Karen" did the same for Neil Sedaka's "Oh! Carol". A particularly clear tribute was to Elvis Presley in "I Dun Lotsa Cryin' Over You". As with the previous Wizzard album, all songs were composed by Roy Wood.

The sleeve featured a credit 'Custard pies - D.L.T.' This referred to one of their appearances on Top of the Pops, when presenter Dave Lee Travis had been the apparently unwitting recipient of a custard pie wielded by one of the group.

== Promotion and release ==
One single was released from the album, "This Is the Story of My Love (Baby)". Its chart performance in the UK Singles Chart (No. 34) was a disappointment, as all Wizzard's previous singles had reached the top 10. However, the album fared better than its predecessor, peaking at No. 19 in the UK Albums Chart — 10 places higher — and was certified Silver.

The original release of Introducing Eddy and the Falcons on the Warner Bros. label, in a gate-fold sleeve, included a fold-out poster of Roy Wood on stage.

The album was reissued by Edsel on CD in 1999, featuring 1974 non-album singles and b-sides as bonus tracks, but was soon deleted. The album was again reissued in 2020 by Esoteric Recordings featuring new liner notes, a miniature replica of the original poster and the same bonus tracks as the Edsel release.

Cheap Trick, who had always been great admirers of Roy Wood, recorded their own version of "We're Gonna Rock 'n' Roll Tonight" (under the abbreviated title "Rock 'n' Roll Tonight") on their 1990 album Busted.

== Track listing ==
All songs written by Roy Wood except where noted.

Side one

1. "Intro" – 0:45
2. "Eddy's Rock" – 3:56
3. "Brand New 88" – 3:21
4. "You Got Me Runnin' " – 3:15
5. "I Dun Lotsa Cryin' Over You" – 3:22
6. "This Is the Story of My Love (Baby)" – 4:45

Side two

1. "Everyday I Wonder" – 4:56
2. "Crazy Jeans" – 2:48
3. "Come Back Karen" – 3:05
4. "We're Gonna Rock 'n' Roll Tonight" – 5:06

=== Bonus tracks (1999 reissue) ===
1. "Rock 'n' Roll Winter (A Loony's Tune)" – 3:09
2. "Dream of Unwin" (Charlie Grima) – 3:09
3. "Nixture" (Nick Pentelow) – 2:31
4. "Are You Ready to Rock" – 2:27
5. "Marathon Man" (Keith Smart, Mike Tyler) – 2:15

== Personnel ==
- Roy Wood – vocals, guitars, drums, oboe, cello, bass guitar, keyboards, bassoon, upright bass, tenor and baritone saxophones, percussion
- Rick Price – bass guitar, guitar, vocals, percussion
- Nick Pentelow – tenor saxophone
- Mike Burney – tenor and baritone saxophones
- Keith Smart – drums
- Charlie Grima – percussion
- Bill Hunt – piano
- Bob Brady – piano and vocals (on final track) and 'incidental boogies'.

== Certifications ==
Certifications for Introducing Eddy and the Falcons
Region	Certification	Certified units/sales
United Kingdom (BPI)	Silver	60,000^{^}
^{^} Shipments figures based on certification alone.
