= Flash Cadillac & the Continental Kids =

American band

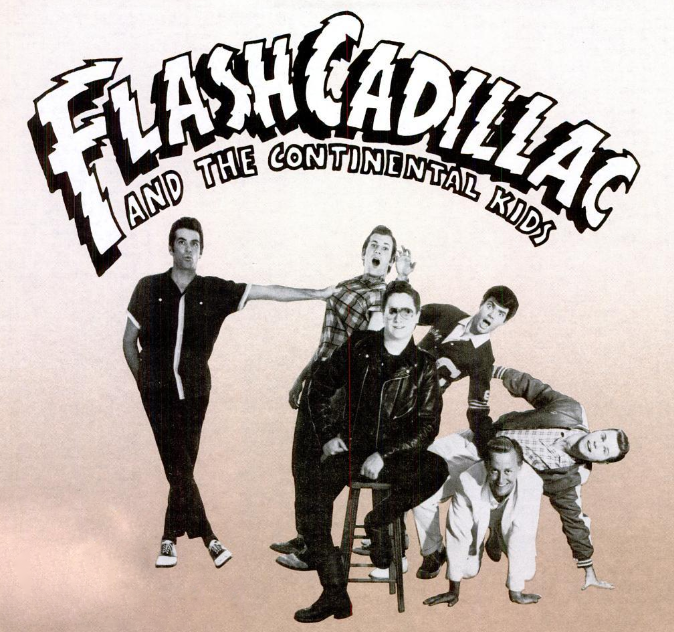
- Flash Cadillac & the Continental Kids as depicted in a 1975 advertisement in Billboard

Background information
- Genres: Rock and roll
- Years active: 1969–present
- Labels: Epic; Private Stock
- Members: Warren Knight; Harold Fielden; Mick "Flash" Manresa; Sam McFadin
- Past members: Linn Phillips; Kris Moe

Flash Cadillac & the Continental Kids, now known as Flash Cadillac, is an American retro rock 'n' roll band known for their appearance as the band "Herby and the Heartbeats" in the 1973 film American Graffiti and a 1975 episode of Happy Days as the band "Johnny Fish & the Fins". During scenes at a high school dance, the band played cover versions of "At the Hop" and "Louie, Louie" as well as their original composition, "She's So Fine". Their version of "At the Hop" was released as a single in 1973.

Flash Cadillac had chart hits in the 1970s with "Dancin' (on a Saturday Night)", written by Lynsey De Paul and Barry Blue, "Good Times, Rock and Roll" and "Did You Boogie (With Your Baby)". "Dancin' (On A Saturday Night)" was listed in the Swedish top 10 in 1974. In 1977, the band released a cover version of Wizzard's "See My Baby Jive" written by Roy Wood. Their cover of "Susie Q" was featured in the film Apocalypse Now.

== History ==
The band began in 1969 in Boulder, Colorado, at the University of Colorado, with Kris Moe as the keyboardist, Linn Phillips on guitar, Warren Knight on bass, Harold Fielden on drums, and Mick "Flash" Manresa also on guitar and as the group's front man. The band got its name, "Flash Cadillac & the Continental Kids" from Hughey Plumley who spent most of his time in the back of a Boulder bar, The Sink, and who entertained himself by creating names for bands.

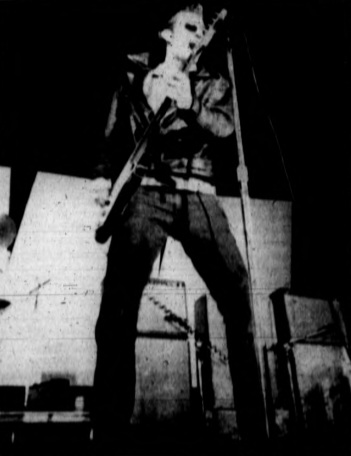
Flash Cadillac & the Continental Kids performing at Main Gym, San Luis Obispo, CA, USA, November 1, 1974

Moe and Phillips' brother, Linn, were college roommates. Through that connection, Moe and Phillips formed the band and played their first performance in February 1969 at a frathouse party. The group moved to Los Angeles in 1970 to try to break into the music scene there. When "Flash", the original lead singer, along with several other band members decided to return to school in 1971, Moe, Phillips, and Knight decided to replace "Flash" by holding auditions. They eventually hired Sam McFadin from Security, Colorado, to fill the position. The group lived together in a house in Los Angeles.

Linn Phillips (born Dustin Linn Phillips on August 1, 1947) died from a heart attack on March 23, 1993, at age 45, and Kris Moe (born Kris Lauritz Moe on September 26, 1949) died from ALS on July 8, 2005, at age 55.

== Discography ==
- 1972 : Flash Cadillac & The Continental Kids
- 1974 : There's No Face Like Chrome
- 1975 : Rock & Roll Forever (two-disc compilation album)
- 1975 : Sons of the Beaches
- 1988 : Later Than Midnight
- 1994 : Night at the Symphony (with the Colorado Springs Symphony)

=== Singles ===
Year	Title	Label	Peak positions			
Year	Title	Label	US (Billboard)	US (Cashbox)	US (Radio & Records)	AUS
1974	"Dancin' (on a Saturday Night)"	Epic	93	79	—	—
1975	"Good Times, Rock and Roll"	Private Stock	41	45	—	—
1975	"Hot Summer Girls"	Private Stock	—	—	—	—
1976	"Did You Boogie (With Your Baby)"	Private Stock	29	25	22	32
