= Rock 'n' Roll Winter (Loony's Tune) =

Single by Wizzard
- B-side: "Dream of Unwin"
- Released: 19 April 1974
- Recorded: 1974
- Genre: Glam rock
- Label: Warner Bros.
- Songwriter: Roy Wood
- Producer: Roy Wood

Wizzard singles chronology
| "I Wish It Could Be Christmas Everyday" (1973) | "Rock 'n' Roll Winter (Loony's Tune)" (1974) | "This Is the Story of My Love (Baby)" (1974) |

"Rock 'n' Roll Winter (Loony's Tune)" was a song written by Roy Wood. It was released by the British rock band Wizzard, as their first single on the Warner Bros label in 1974. It was originally meant to be issued early in 1974 but the date was pushed back to 29 March 1974, before it was finally released on 19 April that year. Nevertheless, it sold well in Europe and reached number 6 on the UK singles chart, number 12 on the Swedish Tio I Topp chart, number 13 on the Irish singles chart, and number 45 on the German singles chart.

The song is dedicated to Roy Wood's girlfriend at the time Lynsey de Paul (aka Loony, from Spike Milligan's nickname for her, Looney de Small) with lyrics such as "Almost every song I dream of in the end, I could dedicate to you my lovely friend" and "But now your friendly music keeps me warm each night". On the record label under the title of the song is the text "Sorry the word "Spring" wouldn't fit". The backing vocals are credited to "Loony", "The Bleach Boys" and "The Suedettes". Although it was not included on the 1974 album Introducing Eddy and the Falcons, it was a bonus track on the CD version released in 2000.

== Chart performance ==
| Chart (1972) | Peak position |
|---|---|
| Germany | 45 |
| Ireland | 13 |
| Sweden | 12 |
| U.K. | 6 |

== Background and release ==
Wizzard was inactive during early 1974, mostly due to Wood's health decline following multiple recordings and concerts. During that year, Wizzard left Harvest and signed with Warner Bros. Records (now Warner Records). Initially meant to be released in early 1974, the single was first delayed to 29 March, but was later released on 19 April of that year.
