= I Wish It Could Be Christmas Everyday =

1973 single by Wizzard

Single by Wizzard
- B-side: "Rob Roy's Nightmare (A Bit More H.A.)"
- Released: December 1973
- Recorded: August 1973
- Studio: Phonogram (London, UK)
- Genre: Glam rock; pop rock; Christmas music
- Length: 4:55
- Label: Harvest, Warner Bros.
- Songwriter: Roy Wood
- Producer: Roy Wood

Wizzard singles chronology
"Angel Fingers" (1973)	"I Wish It Could Be Christmas Everyday" (1973)	"Rock 'n' Roll Winter (Loony's Tune)" (1974)

Music video
- "I Wish It Could Be Christmas Everyday" on YouTube

"I Wish It Could Be Christmas Everyday", sometimes correctly written as "I Wish It Could Be Christmas Every Day", is a Christmas song recorded by English glam rock band Wizzard. It was first released in December 1973 and, like most Wizzard songs, was written and produced by the band's frontman Roy Wood—formerly of the Move and a founding member of Electric Light Orchestra. Despite the song's strong, long-lasting popularity, it has reached no higher than number four on the UK singles chart, a position it occupied for four consecutive weeks from December 1973 to January 1974.

Wood sings lead vocals. The original backing vocals for the single were by the Suedettes, augmented by the choir of Stockland Green School First Year, but, because the master tapes were lost, the 1981 version featuring pupils from Kempsey Primary School is the version that has been heard on TV, radio, streams and downloads since the early 1980s.

The original sleeve of the single credits "Miss Snob and Class 3C" with "Additional noises". The basic track for the single was recorded in August 1973; to create a wintry feeling, engineer Steve Brown decorated the studio with Christmas decorations and turned the air conditioning down to its coldest setting. Wood wore a woollen hat found in lost property. The schoolchildren were brought down from the Midlands to London by bus during the autumn half-term to add their contributions.

At the time of the single's release, Wizzard's contract with EMI was close to expiration. Promotional copies were pressed by Warner Bros., with which the band had just signed for future releases. Only then was it discovered that EMI were legally entitled to the track after all, so the Warner Bros. Records pressings were halted and the record appeared on the Harvest label, but with the same picture sleeve. In a UK television special on ITV in December 2012, the British public voted the song second (behind "Fairytale of New York") in The Nation's Favourite Christmas Song.

== Music video ==
The video shows the band dressed up in a winter-themed studio and then joined by a group of children who play instruments and join in with the singing.

== Re-releases ==
The single was to be re-released in 1981. It was then found that the original tapes had been lost, so the song was re-recorded by the band and a new choir, from Kempsey Primary School in Worcestershire, was used (they had appeared on Roy Wood's solo single "Green Glass Windows" earlier that year). The single reached number 41 on the UK singles chart, and was released again in 1984, this time with an additional extended 12-inch version, getting as far as number 23.

As downloads became eligible for the weekly Top 75 from January 2007, and with exposure thanks to an Argos television advertisement, the song charted again in November and December 2007, this time reaching number 16. In the week of 13 December 2008, the song peaked at number 31. In the week of 14 December 2009, it peaked at number 45. In the week of 11 December 2010, it peaked at number 46. In the week of 12 December 2011, it peaked at number 28. It has appeared in the British top 40 every Christmas since and in the top 25 every Christmas since 2017.

=== Other versions by Roy Wood ===
In 1989, Wood re-recorded part of the song for Jive Bunny and the Mastermixers for use on their festive single "Let's Party", which topped the British chart in December. In 1995, he recorded a live version and released it as a single on his own independent record label Woody Recordings. The only release from a shelved live album, Alive, the single, credited to the Roy Wood Big Band, charted at number 59 on the UK singles chart.

In 2000, Wood re-recorded the song again for Mike Batt's Dramatico Records, as part of a medley with Batt's song "Wombling Merry Christmas". This novelty record was released as "I Wish It Could Be a Wombling Christmas Everyday" by the Wombles with Roy Wood and reached number 22 on the UK singles chart.

On 16 December 2020, Wood appeared with his band on Dave's Meet the Richardsons at Christmas, singing "I Wish It Could Be Christmas Everyday" in Jon Richardson and Lucy Beaumont's garden. This version, which also played out over the end credits, was credited to the Roy Wood Rock & Roll Band.

== Personnel ==
Credits sourced from The Guardian.

Wizzard

- Roy Wood – lead and backing vocals, acoustic guitars, drums, cowbell, shakers, maracas, sleigh bells, glockenspiel, tubular bells, saxophone, woodwinds, cash register
- Bill Hunt – pianos, French horn
- Rick Price – backing vocals, bass guitar, coins
- Keith Smart – drums
- Mike Burney – saxophone, woodwinds
- Nick Pentelow – saxophone, woodwinds

Additional musicians

- Hilary Gunton – backing vocals
- Stockland Green School students – backing vocals

== Charts ==
Year	Song	Chart position		
Year	Song	UK	IRL	SWE Heat
1973	"I Wish It Could Be Christmas Everyday"^{[C]}	4	6	—
1981	"I Wish It Could Be Christmas Everyday" (re-recording)^{[E]}	41	32	—
1984	"I Wish It Could Be Christmas Everyday"^{[F]}	86	—	—
1984	"I Wish It Could Be Christmas Everyday" (re-issue)^{[G]}	23	36	—
2007	"I Wish It Could Be Christmas Everyday" (re-entry)^{[H]}	16	42	—
2008	"I Wish It Could Be Christmas Everyday" (re-entry)	31	42	—
2009	"I Wish It Could Be Christmas Everyday" (re-entry)	45	23	—
2010	"I Wish It Could Be Christmas Everyday" (re-entry)	46	28	—
2011	"I Wish It Could Be Christmas Everyday" (re-entry)	28	30	—
2012	"I Wish It Could Be Christmas Everyday" (re-entry)	29	37	—
2013	"I Wish It Could Be Christmas Everyday" (re-entry)	31	—	—
2014	"I Wish It Could Be Christmas Everyday" (re-entry)	35	68	—
2015	"I Wish It Could Be Christmas Everyday" (re-entry)	27	49	—
2016	"I Wish It Could Be Christmas Everyday" (re-entry)	23	60	—
2017	"I Wish It Could Be Christmas Everyday" (re-entry)	15	29	—
2018	"I Wish It Could Be Christmas Everyday" (re-entry)	12	29	—
2019	"I Wish It Could Be Christmas Everyday" (re-entry)	10	?	—
2020	"I Wish It Could Be Christmas Everyday" (re-entry)	12	44	—
2021	"I Wish It Could Be Christmas Everyday" (re-entry)	15	26	20
2022	"I Wish It Could Be Christmas Everyday" (re-entry)	19	25	—
2023	"I Wish It Could Be Christmas Everyday" (re-entry)	25	32	—
2024	"I Wish It Could Be Christmas Everyday" (re-entry)	22	33	—
2025	"I Wish It Could Be Christmas Everyday" (re-entry)	24	—	—
"–" denotes releases that did not chart or were not released in that territory.

- A Vocal backing by the Suedettes
- B Vocal backing by the Suedettes and the Bleach Boys
- C Wizzard featuring vocal backing by the Suedettes plus the Stockland Green Bilateral School First Year Choir with additional noises by Miss Snob and Class 3C
- D Credited to Roy Wood's Wizzard
- E This is the new version with children from Kempsey Primary School, but released on Harvest Records with the same catalogue number as the original.
- F Credited by the Official Charts Company as Roy Wood and Wizzard
- G Re-entry of re-issue with 12" re-recording
- H In the digital era of downloads and streaming, the record is credited simply to Wizzard, with the rights holder being EMI Records.

== Certifications and sales ==
Region	Certification	Certified units/sales
United Kingdom (BPI)	4× Platinum	2,400,000^{‡}
^{‡} Sales+streaming figures based on certification alone.

== The Big Reunion version ==
"I Wish It Could Be Christmas Everyday"

Single by The Big Reunion (Five, 911, Atomic Kitten, Honeyz, B*Witched, Liberty X and Blue)
- Released: 16 December 2013
- Recorded: October–November 2013
- Studio: London, England
- Genre: Christmas
- Length: 4:48
- Label: Universal
- Songwriter: Roy Wood
- Producer: Cutfather

Blue singles chronology
"Break My Heart" (2013)	"I Wish It Could Be Christmas Everyday" (2013)	"Broken" / "Ayo" (2014)

Five singles chronology
"Rock the Party" (2001)	"I Wish It Could Be Christmas" (2013)

911 singles chronology
"2 Hearts 1 Love" (2013)	"I Wish It Could Be Christmas Everyday" (2013)	"I Do" (2014)

Atomic Kitten singles chronology
"Cradle" (2005)	"I Wish It Could Be Christmas Everyday" (2013)	"Southgate You're the One" (2021)

B*Witched singles chronology
"Jump Down" (2000)	"I Wish It Could Be Christmas Everyday" (2013)	"Hold On" (2019)

Honeyz singles chronology
"Talk to the Hand" (2001)	"I Wish It Could Be Christmas Everyday" (2013)	"Definitely Something" (2015)

Liberty X singles chronology
"X" (2006)	"I Wish It Could Be Christmas Everyday" (2013)

Music video
- "I Wish It Could Be Christmas Everyday" on YouTube

=== Background and release ===
On 23 October 2013, it was announced that the seven 1990s and early 2000s pop groups who reunited for the ITV2 series The Big Reunion - Five, 911, Atomic Kitten, B*Witched, Blue, Honeyz and Liberty X - would be releasing a cover version of "I Wish It Could Be Christmas Everyday", with all proceeds split between six Text Santa charities: Age UK, Barnardo's, BeatBullying, the British Heart Foundation, CLIC Sargent and Help the Hospices.

The recording of the charity single, which was produced by Danish producer and songwriter Cutfather, was the subject of a behind-the-scenes documentary broadcast on ITV2 on 12 December 2013. The song was released on 16 December 2013 and charted for 1 week in the UK top 75 at number 21, with the release credited to The Big Reunion Cast 2013.

=== Music video ===
The official music video for the Big Reunion version of the song was uploaded to YouTube on 2 December 2013.

=== Charts ===
Chart (2013)	Peak position
Ireland (IRMA)	82
Scottish Singles Sales (Official Charts)	32
UK Singles (Official Charts)	21
