= Bill Hunt (musician) =

English multi-instrumentalist

- Born: 23 May 1947 (age 79); Birmingham, England
- Genres: Glam rock; art rock; classical; rock and roll; jazz-rock; orchestral rock
- Occupations: Musician; music teacher
- Instruments: French horn; hunting horn; keyboards; tuba
- Years active: 1969–present
- Labels: B&C Records; Harvest
- Formerly of: Hannibal; The Move; Electric Light Orchestra; Wizzard

Bill Hunt (born 23 May 1947) is an English multi-instrumentalist, best known for playing for the Electric Light Orchestra and Wizzard in the early 1970s.

== Early life ==
Born on 23 May 1947 in Birmingham to a working class family of musicians, Hunt attended the Birmingham School of Music and Wingwood Brothers Comprehensive School learning instruments such as harpsichord, tuba, hunting horn, and piano alongside others, learning the last instrument at the age of 8.

== Career ==
=== Early career ===
Early in his career, Bill played electric organ and French horn in a quartet called "Hannibal", formed in 1969, which released a self-titled album in 1970. He joined Breakthru in 1969, replacing Geoff Garratley, and playing hammond organ and vocals.

=== Electric Light Orchestra and The Move ===
In 1970, Hunt joined the Electric Light Orchestra on horns and keyboards, joining Roy Wood and Jeff Lynne. He also played on a Beat-Club appearance for The Move, which was Wood and Lynne's other band. Around that point The Move were a quintet featuring Wood, Lynne, Hunt, Bev Bevan and Richard Tandy. With the Electric Light Orchestra however, Bill played french horn in their first album The Electric Light Orchestra (also known as No Answer in the US).

=== Wizzard ===
In 1972, Wood left ELO to form Wizzard, with Hunt and Hugh McDowell also joining, with contributions in Wizzard Brew and Introducing Eddy and the Falcons. At Wizzard, he was known to have a habit of breaking the pianos on the location he was in. However, being the only piano player he left in 1973 to become a music teacher.

=== Post-Wizzard ===
Hunt returned to the music business in 1989 when he joined Dave Hill's band Blessings in Disguise. Their debut single was a cover of "Crying in the Rain" by The Everly Brothers and backed by Hill/Hunt song "Wild Nights". Bill now leads a band called "The Ancient Order of Froth Blowers".

== Personal life ==
Hunt's son, Will Hunt, is also a musician, while his nephew, Miles Hunt, is another musician. Both of them are part of The Ancient Order of Froth Blowers.
