= See My Baby Jive =

Single by Wizzard

from the album Wizzard Brew
- B-side: "Bend Over Beethoven"
- Released: 6 April 1973
- Recorded: 1973
- Genre: Glam rock
- Length: 5:00
- Label: Harvest
- Songwriter: Roy Wood
- Producer: Roy Wood

Wizzard singles chronology
"Ball Park Incident" (1972)	"See My Baby Jive" (1973)	"Angel Fingers" (1973)

Official Audio
- "See My Baby Jive" (2006 Remaster) on YouTube

"See My Baby Jive" is a song written by Roy Wood. A version recorded by Wizzard, the British glam rock group whom he led, and which was produced by him, was released in April 1973 as the band's second single. This was their first to reach number one on the UK singles chart; it spent four weeks at the top of the chart during May and June 1973. It also reached number one in the Irish IRMA chart and number 5 in the German official singles chart. The song was a number 12 hit nationally in Australia, reaching even higher in some regional charts. It was the sixth–best-selling UK single in 1973.

The single's label attributed backing vocals to "The Suedettes".

ABBA later acknowledged its influence on the song "Waterloo", which the following year became that group's first major international hit. A cover version by Flash Cadillac & the Continental Kids was released in 1977.

== Personnel ==
(Album credits) Source:

- Roy Wood – vocal, electric and acoustic guitars, sitar, cello, bassoon, baritone saxophone, string bass, B-flat bass tuba, trombone, recorders, percussion
- Rick Price – bass guitar, vocals, percussion
- Bill Hunt – piano, harpsichord, French horn, trumpet, flugelhorn, tenor horn, bugle, euphonium, E-flat tuba, little glass, backing vocals
- Hugh 'H' McDowell – cello, ARP synthesiser
- Nick Pentelow – tenor saxophone, clarinet, flute, bass backing vocals
- Mike Burney – alto, tenor, baritone & synthesized saxes, clarinet, flute
- Keith Smart – drums
- Charlie Grima – drums, congas, percussion

== Chart history ==
Chart (1973)	Position
Australian Singles Chart	12
Austrian Singles Chart	20
Belgian Singles Chart	19
Irish Singles Chart	1
Dutch Singles Chart	10
German Singles Chart	5
New Zealand Listener	4
Norwegian Singles Chart	9
UK Singles Chart	1

== Certifications ==
Certifications for "See My Baby Jive"
Region	Certification	Certified units/sales
United Kingdom (BPI)	Gold	500,000^{^}
^{^} Shipments figures based on certification alone.
