= One and One Is One (song) =

Single by Medicine Head

from the album One & One Is One
- B-side: "Out on the Street"
- Released: 1973
- Genre: Rock
- Label: Polydor
- Songwriter(s): John Fiddler
- Producer(s): Tony Ashton

Medicine Head singles chronology
"On the Land" (1972)	"One and One Is One" (1973)	"Rising Sun" (1973)

"One and One Is One" is a song by the British band Medicine Head, written by band member John Fiddler.

Released as a single in 1973, it entered the UK Singles Chart in May, reaching number 3 in June and staying in the charts for 13 weeks.

The arrangement includes a Jew's harp.

== Charts ==
Chart (1973)	Peak position
United Kingdom (Official Charts Company)	3
Australia (Kent Music Report)	50
