= Rick Price (bassist) =

English bassist (1944–2022)

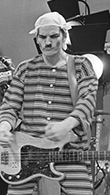
- Price with Wizzard in 1974

Background information
- Born: Richard Gordon Price; 10 June 1944; Birmingham, England
- Died: 17 May 2022 (aged 77) Bristol, England
- Genres: Rock
- Occupation: Musician
- Instruments: Bass, vocals, pedal steel guitar
- Years active: 1960–2022

Richard Gordon Price (10 June 1944 – 17 May 2022) was an English bassist and singer who played with various Birmingham-based rock bands, most notably Sight and Sound, the Move (1969–1971), and Wizzard (1972–1975).

== Career ==
He first picked up the guitar in 1957 for a school play at Colmers Farm Secondary School. He soon stopped playing the instrument, but saw interest in music again by 1960 when he realised that "girls liked boys in groups". His first band were the Cimarrons, who were inspired by the Shadows. He then moved on to the Sombreros, who later changed their name to Sight & Sound and moved in a more psychedelic direction.

He began collaborating with Mike Sheridan (under his real name Michael Tyler) as a songwriting partnership. His influences in his earlier career in the 1950s included rock and roll artists such as Bill Haley, Elvis Presley, Eddie Cochran, Buddy Holly, Cliff Richard and Lonnie Donegan.

Price joined The Move in 1969, replacing Trevor Burton, staying with the group for two years, including an unsuccessful tour of the United States. When the Move ended, they re-emerged as Electric Light Orchestra (ELO), and Price contributed bass tracks to the early sessions for the debut album of ELO, but for reasons that are unclear, none of his bass parts ended up in the final mix of the album when it was released in 1971. He left in 1971, being replaced by Richard Tandy.

While still in the Move he signed a contract with Gemini Records; he then recorded (with Sheridan) the album This Is To Certify That, released in 1970, and a solo album, Talking To The Flowers, in 1971. He then joined former Move colleague Carl Wayne in Light Fantastic, before forming Mongrel with future Wizzard drummers Charlie Grima and Keith Smart.

He joined up again with Roy Wood in the latter's new band, Wizzard, with whom he had two British number one hit singles, "See My Baby Jive" and "Angel Fingers", as well as the No. 4 Christmas classic "I Wish It Could Be Christmas Everyday" (all 1973).

After Wizzard split up, he joined the Wizzo Band on pedal steel guitar in 1975, but they broke up in 1978. Price was also a member of The Rockin' Berries from 1990 until his death.

== Personal life and death ==
Richard Gordon Price was born in Rednal, Birmingham, on 10 June 1944 to Catherine and Frank Price. He had three brothers and a sister, and the family moved to the border of Worcestershire and Warwickshire when Price was a child.

Price worked with the 1970s duo Peters and Lee beginning in 1976, eventually marrying Dianne Lee and working with her as a songwriting and performing duo.

Price died of natural causes in Bristol on 17 May 2022, at the age of 77.
