= Dancin' (on a Saturday Night) =

Single by Barry Blue

from the album Barry Blue
- B-side: "New Day"
- Released: 1973
- Genre: Glam rock
- Length: 3:10
- Label: Bell Records
- Songwriters: Lynsey de Paul and Barry Blue

"Dancin' (on a Saturday Night)" is a song written by Lynsey de Paul and Barry Blue, that was recorded by Blue and released as a single in 1973 on Bell Records. Blue's backing band of session musicians were well known in the industry and one year later the drummer, John Richardson, joined the Rubettes.

Barry Blue's song reached the number 2 on the UK Singles Chart, (and number 1 on the Melody Maker top 30), number 2 on the Australian Kent Music chart, number 3 on the Austrian singles chart, number 4 on the Irish Singles Chart, number 9 on the German singles chart, and number 11 on the Dutch singles chart.

It was also a track on the first in a series of compilation albums released by the BBC in their series Best of Top of the Pops, released in 1975 and that spent five weeks on the UK Albums Chart, peaking at No. 21.

The song ranked the 18th best selling single in Australia in 1973, and 23rd best selling single in the UK in 1973.

Barry Blue's version of the song has also appeared on the soundtrack to the films Anita and Me, and American Swing. A remixed version of the original Barry Blue song was released in 1989, reaching number 86 on the UK Singles Chart. It also is featured in the film The Long Good Friday. The song has become a line dance classic. It was included on the 2023 compilation album "Now Yearbook 1973" which peaked at No. 2 on the UK Official Compilations Chart in September that year.

== Chart performance ==
Chart (1973)	Peak position
Austria	3
Australia	2
Belgium	13
Denmark	5
Germany	9
Ireland	4
Netherlands	11
Rhodesia	10
Singapore	6
Spain	19
UK	2

== Cover versions ==
Flash Cadillac & the Continental Kids released their version of the song as a single in 1974 and it became a U.S. hit, reaching number 79 on the Cashbox singles charts and number 93 on the Billboard Hot 100. The group performed a memorable live version of the song on the TV program The Midnight Special (TV series). It also charted in Sweden and reached number 7 on the Tio I top charts. It also appeared as the lead track on their 1974 album, There's No Face Like Chrome.

In Canada, a version recorded by the Canadian band Bond in 1975 reached number 12 on the CHUM Chart, and was included in the RPM Canadian Top 20 Albums Chart that year. The song was also included on their self-named album, as well as the K-Tel album Canada Gold, both released in 1975.

The Danish band, Clear Sound, also recorded a version with Danish lyrics by Finn Reiner which charted at number 17 in the Danish Hitlister. It was also covered by co-writer Lynsey de Paul on her 1974 album, Taste Me... Don't Waste Me and in a similar style albeit with Italian lyrics by Mia Martini as "Sabato".

There have been many cover versions of the song recorded by other artists including The Hiltonaires who recorded a version as track 4 on the B side of their album Made in England 7.
