= Long Haired Lover from Liverpool =

Single by Little Jimmy Osmond

from the album Killer Joe
- B-side: "Mother of Mine"
- Released: March 25, 1972
- Genre: Pop
- Length: 2:15
- Label: MGM
- Songwriter: Christopher Kingsley (credited as Christopher Dowden on the UK release)
- Producers: Mike Curb and Perry Botkin Jr

Little Jimmy Osmond singles chronology
"Chitchana Koibito" (1970)	"Long Haired Lover from Liverpool" (1972)	"Tweedle Dee" (1972)

Music video
- "Long Haired Lover from Liverpool" on YouTube

"Long Haired Lover from Liverpool" is a pop song best known as a hit for Little Jimmy Osmond. Written by Christopher Kingsley (credited as Christopher Dowden on the UK release) and produced by Mike Curb and Perry Botkin Jr, "Long Haired Lover from Liverpool" was a UK number one single for Jimmy Osmond. Riding high on the popularity of the Osmonds, Jimmy (the youngest sibling) had a massive hit with the song, in the process becoming the youngest person to ever reach number one on the UK Singles Chart aged 9 years 8 months.

A UK number one for five weeks in December 1972, it was the Christmas number one that year, and has since sold over a million copies in the UK. It also reached number two on the Australian Singles Chart (Kent Music Report) and number 38 on the US, Billboard Hot 100.

The song was first recorded by the writer and released in 1969. Kingsley's recording was an unsuccessful single although it was played by a popular MOR station, KMPC, in Los Angeles.

== Charts ==
Chart (1972)	Position
Australia (Kent Music Report)	2
Ireland (IRMA)	1
UK Singles (Official Charts Company)	1
US (Billboard Hot 100)	38
