= Angel Fingers (A Teen Ballad) =

Single by Wizzard

from the album Wizzard Brew (2006 reissue)
- B-side: "You Got the Jump on Me"
- Released: 1973
- Recorded: 1973
- Genre: Glam rock
- Length: 4:39
- Label: Harvest
- Songwriter: Roy Wood
- Producer: Roy Wood

Wizzard singles chronology
"See My Baby Jive" (1973)	"Angel Fingers (A Teen Ballad)" (1973)	"I Wish It Could Be Christmas Everyday" (1973)

Official audio
- "Angel Fingers (A Teen Ballad)" (2005 Remaster) on YouTube

"Angel Fingers (A Teen Ballad)" is a popular song by English rock band Wizzard. Written and produced by Roy Wood, it was Wizzard's second, and last, UK number one single, spending a week at the top of the UK Singles Chart in September 1973. It peaked at number seven in Ireland.

Backing vocals were provided by The Bleach Boys and the Suedettes.

Far Out Magazine's Lauren Hunter considered "Angel Fingers" a contender of "the worst number one of 1973".

== Charts ==
Chart (1973)	Peak position
Australia (Kent Music Report)	42
Ireland	7
United Kingdom (Official Charts Company)	1

== Certifications ==
Certifications for "Angel Fingers"
Region	Certification	Certified units/sales
United Kingdom (BPI)	Silver	250,000^{^}
^{^} Shipments figures based on certification alone.
