= Wizzard =

British 1970s rock and roll band

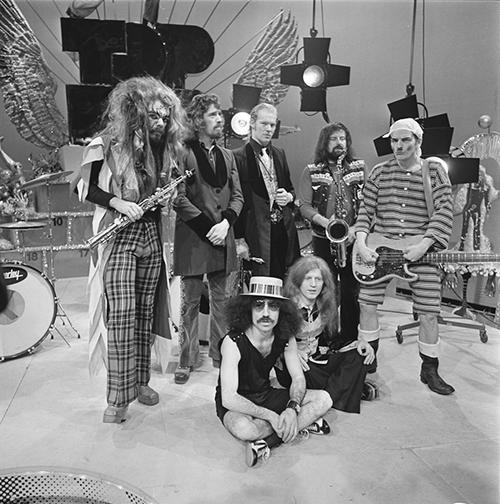
- Wizzard in May 1974. Standing from left to right: Roy Wood, Keith Smart, Nick Pentelow, Mike Burney, Rick Price. Sitting from left to right: Charlie Grima, Bob Brady

Background information
- Origin: Birmingham, Warwickshire, England
- Genres: Glam rock; art rock; rock and roll; jazz rock
- Years active: 1972–1975
- Labels: Jet; EMI; United Artists; Warner Bros.; Edsel
- Spinoffs: Wizzo Band; Violinski
- Spinoff of: Electric Light Orchestra; The Move
- Past members: Roy Wood; Mike Burney; Charlie Grima; Bill Hunt; Hugh McDowell; Nick Pentelow; Rick Price; Keith Smart; Bob Brady

Wizzard was an English rock band formed by Roy Wood, previously a co-founding member of the Move and the Electric Light Orchestra. The Guinness Book of 500 Number One Hits states, "Wizzard was Roy Wood just as much as Wings was Paul McCartney." They are most famous for their 1973 Christmas single "I Wish It Could Be Christmas Everyday", which went Top 5 in the UK. They also achieved two UK No. 1 singles with "See My Baby Jive" and "Angel Fingers (A Teen Ballad)"

== History ==
=== Beginnings ===
Not long after the release of Electric Light Orchestra's first album, Wood found himself in disagreement with the methodology of the band's manager Don Arden. Following a musical difference of opinion with co-frontman Jeff Lynne during recording of the band's second album, ELO 2, Wood walked out of the session, went down the road to a studio where the Birmingham group Mongrel (which included his former Move bandmate Rick Price, as well as drummers Charlie Grima and Keith Smart) were recording, and asked them if they would be interested in putting a band together.

Wood left ELO, taking band members Bill Hunt (keyboards and french horn) and Hugh McDowell (cello) with him, as well as ELO's sound engineer, Trevor Smith. Despite press reporting a fallout between Wood and co-founder/leader Jeff Lynne, Wood denies that he and Lynne ever had a real row, blaming it on press fabrication and insisting that "We never had a real row and we're still mates now." In fact, Wood claimed that he left the group because he foresaw a fallout between him and Lynne due to their increasing differences of opinion (which he felt were caused, indirectly, by the band's management) and wanted to avoid it.

Also in the line-up were saxophone players Mike Burney and Nick Pentelow (the son of actor Arthur Pentelow). Prior to the recording of the band's second album, Introducing Eddy and the Falcons, McDowell left and was not replaced (he returned to ELO), and during the recording of the album Bill Hunt also departed and was replaced by Bob Brady (also from Mongrel). Prior to the 1975 recording of the band's final album, Main Street (released 2000), drummer Keith Smart departed the band and was not replaced.

=== Chart success and tours ===
The band made their live debut at The London Rock and Roll Show at Wembley Stadium on 5 August 1972. Wizzard's second appearance was at the Reading Festival later that month. With Wood's distinctive warpaint make-up and colourful costume, not to mention regular appearances on BBC Television's Top of the Pops in which members and friends, including Wood's girl friend, singer Ayshea Brough, variously appeared in pantomime horses, gorilla costumes or as roller-skating angels, often wielding custard pies for good measure, Wizzard were one of the most picturesque groups of the British glam rock era. In 1973 they scored their first Top 10 hit with "Ball Park Incident", which made No. 6 for three weeks from 13 January. Their biggest hit was with their second single. "See My Baby Jive", Wood's faithful and affectionate tribute to the Phil Spector-generated 'Wall of Sound', made No. 1 in the UK Singles Chart for four weeks. It sold over one million copies globally, and was awarded gold disc status. The follow-up, "Angel Fingers", also topped the charts for one week. Wizzard's songs often included lengthy instrumental improvisations.

The band's 1973 Christmas single "I Wish It Could Be Christmas Everyday" became an annual fixture on British (and Irish) radio and television. It was reissued in 1981, and a 12" re-recording appeared in 1984.

During 1973 Harvest Records released the Roy Wood solo album Boulders, which he had recorded and mixed years before forming Wizzard, and which produced a Top 20 hit in "Dear Elaine". Wood said he was bored with Boulders by the time of its release and he wanted to focus on his new music with Wizzard. The subsequent heavy working schedule and strain led to health problems, and several cancelled or postponed live dates on a spring 1974 tour of the UK. One highlight of 1974 was a return to the Top 10 with "Rock 'n' Roll Winter (Loony's Tune)". Release was delayed for several weeks until the end of March, so the words 'Sorry, the word 'Spring' wouldn't fit. R.W.' were added on the label after the title. Unusually for the time, this song and the B-side, "Dream of Unwin", were both recorded and released in mono. The song was dedicated to Wood's girlfriend at the time, Lynsey de Paul, who repaid the honour by recording a Wizzard-style song, "Ooh I Do", a few months later.

A tour of the US later that year failed to bring them any commercial success there, but after meeting Brian Wilson some members guested on a Beach Boys session, which resulted in the eventual release of the latter group's single "It's OK" in 1976. According to Wood, the record label neglected to make a substantial push to make Wizzard a success in the U.S., preferring to focus promotion on England since the band were already very popular there.

=== Financial difficulties ===
Wizzard was an expensive band to maintain, both because of the large line-up, in terms of recording costs, and Bill Hunt's propensity to smash the pianos of the venues they were playing at. Studio time was an even greater drain on the band's finances. According to Price in a radio interview, "When we finished recording 'Angel Fingers' it was rumoured that we had spent more time in the studio than Paul McCartney had with the whole of the Band on the Run album." Whether it was true or not, this meant that most of the record company's money was spent in studio time and that the members of the band had to rely on live touring work for their income. A couple of tours in the UK and one tour of the US were not enough to ensure regular wages for the band. One by one the band members found other, more lucrative, things to occupy their time.

=== Disbanding ===
By autumn 1975 they had split, leaving a farewell single, "Rattlesnake Roll", which failed to chart, and a third album, Main Street, which their record label did not release as they deemed it insufficiently commercial. Wizzard had initially intended their second album to be a double, with one disc a set of rock and roll pastiches and the other disc jazz-rock. The label heard the rock and roll set and decided to release that as a single album, which appeared in 1974 as Introducing Eddy & The Falcons. Main Street, the jazz-rock set, languished in the vaults and was for some time presumed lost, but was finally released in 2000.

=== Post-Wizzard ===
Following the band's split in 1975, Wood and Price formed the short-lived Wizzo Band, after which Wood reverted to a solo career in addition to producing records for other acts, notably a 1979 Top 10 cover version of "Duke of Earl" for British doo-wop revivalists Darts.

On 13 November 2014, saxophonist Mike Burney died, aged 76, after a long battle with cancer. Hugh McDowell died on 6 November 2018 following a long illness, at the age of 65. On 17 May 2022, bassist Rick Price died aged 77. Drummer Keith Smart died on 2 September 2025, at the age of 78.

== Members ==
- Roy Wood — vocals, guitars, saxophone, woodwinds, strings, keyboards, percussion (1972–1978)
- Rick Price – bass, pedal steel guitar (from 1977), backing vocals (1972–1978; died 2022)
- Mike Burney – saxophone, clarinet, flute (1972–1976; died 2014)
- Nick Pentelow – saxophone, clarinet, flute (1972–1976)
- Charlie Grima – drums, percussion, vocals (1972–1976)
- Keith Smart – drums (1972–1975; died 2025)
- Bill Hunt - keyboards, French horn (1972–1974)
- Hugh McDowell — cello, synthesisers (1972–1973; died 2018)
- Bob Brady – keyboards, backing vocals (1974–1976)

Wizzo Band members (1975–1978)

- Paul Robbins – keyboards, backing vocals (1976–1978)
- Dave Donovan – drums (1976–1978)
- Billy Paul – saxophone (1976–1978)
- Bob Wilson – trombone (1976–1978)
- Graham Gallery – bass (1977–1978)

== Discography ==
=== Albums ===
Title	Album details	Peak chart positions		Certifications
Title	Album details	UK	AUS	Certifications
Wizzard Brew	Released: March 1973; Label: Harvest	29	50	
Introducing Eddy and the Falcons	Released: August 1974; Label: Warner Bros.	19	—	BPI: Silver
Main Street (Roy Wood & Wizzard)	Released: 2000; Label: Edsel	—	—	
"—" denotes releases that did not chart or were not released in that territory.

=== Compilations ===
Title	Album details
See My Baby Jive	Released: October 1974; Label: Harvest
Look Thru' The Eyes Of... (Hits & Rarities Brilliance & Charm... 1974-1987) (Roy Wood & Wizzard)	Released: 2007; Label: Castle

=== Singles ===
Year	Title	Peak chart positions				Certifications	Album
Year	Title	UK	AUS	GER	IRL	Certifications	Album
1972	"Ball Park Incident"	6	70	—	8		non-album singles
1973	"See My Baby Jive" (Note: vocal backing by The Suedettes)	1	12	5	1	BPI: Gold	non-album singles
1973	"Angel Fingers (A Teen Ballad)" (Note: vocal backing:The Suedettes and the Bleach Boys)	1	42	22	7	BPI: Silver	non-album singles
1973	"I Wish It Could Be Christmas Everyday" (Note: Wizzard featuring vocal backing by The Suedettes plus The Stockland Green Bilateral School First Year Choir with additional noises by Miss Snob and Class 3C)	4	52 (Note: first charted in 2022)	—	6	BPI: 4× Platinum	non-album singles
1974	"Rock 'n' Roll Winter (Loony's Tune)"	6	—	—	13		non-album singles
1974	"This Is the Story of My Love (Baby)"	34	—	—	—		Introducing Eddy and the Falcons
1974	"Are You Ready to Rock"	8	—	—	10		non-album singles
1975	"Rattlesnake Roll"	—	—	—	—		non-album singles
1976	"Indiana Rainbow" (as Roy Wood's Wizzard)	—	—	—	—		Main Street
1981	"I Wish It Could Be Christmas Everyday" (re-issue)	41	—	—	—		non-album singles
1984	"I Wish It Could Be Christmas Everyday" (re-issue) (as Roy Wood and Wizzard)	86	—	—	—		non-album singles
"—" denotes releases that did not chart or were not released in that territory.
