= Mike Burney =

English jazz saxophonist (1938–2014)

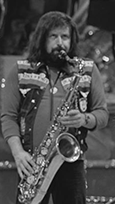
- Burney with Wizzard in 1974

Background information
- Born: Michael Burney; 7 October 1938; Birmingham, England
- Died: 13 November 2014 (aged 76)
- Genres: Jazz, pop, glam rock
- Instruments: Alto saxophone, tenor saxophone, flute, clarinet,

Michael Burney (7 October 1938 – 13 November 2014) was an English jazz saxophonist, most notable for his tenure in Roy Wood's Wizzard.

== Early life ==
Burney was born in the Great Barr area of Birmingham, and educated at Bromsgrove College of Further Education.

== Career ==
Between 1968 and 1970, Burney was in Billy Fury's backing band. Following this, he was a member of Wizzard, playing on records such as "I Wish It Could Be Christmas Everyday". He also wrote its b-side, "Rob Roy's Nightmare (A Bit More H.A.)".

More recently, he worked with the Million-Airs Big Band & Concert Orchestra and spent eight years with the Syd Lawrence Orchestra. He also worked on a joint project with other Wizzard members called The Old Horns Band. He had a residency at Miller & Carter in Sutton Coldfield. He died on 13 November 2014 at the age of 76.

== Session and live work ==
Burney toured, accompanied and sessioned with Chaka Khan, The Beach Boys, Sammy Davis Jr., Petula Clark, Memphis Slim, Steve Winwood, Ruby Turner, Adam Faith, Bob Hope, Cliff Richard, Cilla Black, Dionne Warwick and Matt Monro; covering a range of blues, jazz and big band genres.
