= Cliff Twemlow =

British actor and film-maker (1937–1993)

- Twemlow in the film G.B.H. Grievous Bodily Harm (1983)
- Born: Clifford Twemlow; 14 October 1937; Hulme, Manchester, Lancashire, England
- Died: 9 May 1993 (aged 55); Manchester, England. Buried at St Wilfred's Church, Northenden, Manchester
- Years active: 1960s–1993

Cliff Twemlow (14 October 1937 – 5 May 1993) was an English actor, film screenwriter, producer, composer and novelist. He is notable for pioneering, in the early 1980s, the production of independently-made low-budget films made for the home video market.

== Early life ==
Twemlow was born in Hulme, Manchester, the son of a merchant seaman. In the early 1950s he worked as a nightclub bouncer in Morecambe.

== Career ==
In 1962 Twemlow began his acting career as an extra in the ITV soap opera Coronation Street.

=== Music ===
In the early 1960s Twemlow began a successful career composing library music under the names Peter Reno and John Agar. His music was used in TV programmes (e.g., Public Eye, Rutland Weekend Television, The Benny Hill Show, Queenie's Castle , The Sweeney), feature films (e.g., Zeta One (1970), Secrets of Sex (1970), Deathdream (1974), A Touch of the Sun (1979), Dawn of the Dead (1978)) and TV commercials. He wrote "Distant Hills", the end credit theme of the ITV programme Crown Court (1972–1984), which was issued as the B-side to the Van der Valk theme "Eye Level" (Columbia DB 8946).

In 1973 he encountered legal problems with his song "Live and Let Die", recorded by Salena Jones. Although released shortly before Paul McCartney recorded his song with the same title for the film Live and Let Die (1973), McCartney successfully took out an injunction against Twemlow.

=== Writing ===
In 1980 Twemlow published his autobiography The Tuxedo Warrior, which documented his career in the music industry and as a bouncer. The book inspired the film Tuxedo Warrior (1982), which however ignores his life and instead uses him as a character in a fictional narrative.

He wrote two novels: The Pike (1982), of which he announced a film version but failed to secure funding, and The Beast of Kane (1983).

=== Film ===
In 1983 Twemlow wrote, produced and starred in G.B.H. Grievous Bodily Harm, one of the earliest British films to be shot on video, which sold over 10,000 copies in its first month of release. He starred in nine more films until 1992, produced a pilot for a TV show, and appeared in several special interest training films produced by Brian Sterling-Vete on the MajorVision label includingThe Power to Win, The Ultimate Self Defense and Fitness Over Forty.

== Death ==
Twemlow died from a heart attack on 9 May 1993, aged 55.

== Documentary ==
Twemlow is the subject of the 2023 documentary Mancunian Man: The Legendary Life of Cliff Twemlow by Jake West (Severin Films).

== Filmography ==
Film	Year	Director	Role as actor	Credits
Tuxedo Warrior	1981	Andrew Sinclair	Chaser	
G.B.H. Grievous Bodily Harm	1983	David Kent-Watson	Steve Donovan	Screenwriter, co-producer, music (as John Agar)
Target Eve Island a.k.a. Operation Urgent Fury	1983	David Kent-Watson	Chaser	Screenwriter, producer
The Ibiza Connection	1984	Howard Arundel	Wolf Svenson (as Mike Sullivan)	Co-screenwriter, producer
The Omega Connection (re-edit of Tuxedo Warrior)	1985	Andrew Sinclair	Chaser	Screenwriter, co-producer, music (as John Agar)
The African Run (re-edit of Tuxedo Warrior)	1985	Andrew Sinclair	Chaser	Screenwriter, co-producer, music (as John Agar)
Moonstalker a.k.a. Predator: The Quietus	1986	Leslie McCarthy	Daniel Kane (as Mike Sullivan)	Screenwriter, co-producer
The Eye of Satan	1987	David Kent-Watson	Kane	Screenwriter, co-producer
The Hit Man a.k.a. The Ambassador	1988	Leslie McCarthy	uncredited	
Firestar: First Contact	1991	David Kent-Watson	John D Trooper (as Mike Sullivan)	Screenwriter, producer
G.B.H. 2: Lethal Impact a.k.a. The Manchester Mandate	1991	David Kent-Watson	Steve Donovan (as Mike Sullivan)	Screenwriter, co-producer
Bad Weekend (short)	1992	David Kent-Watson	Hawk (as Mike Sullivan)	Screenwriter, co-producer

== Discography ==
All albums credited to Peter Reno, and released by De Wolfe Music, except where noted.

- Z-Patrol (1967, with Reg Tilsley)
- Inter City (1967, with John Reids and Jack Trombey)
- Bossalena (1967, with Keith Papworth and Edward Ward)
- Mini-Skirt (1967, with Les Reed and Reg Tilsley)
- There's a World Going On (1967, with Reg Tilsley and others)
- Lucky Me (1967, track "Intimate")
- Travelling Light (1967)
- Polaris (1967)
- For the Young (1967, with John Reids)
- Big City Story (1968)
- More Electric Banana (1968) (songs "Street Girl" and "Love, Dance and Sing")
- Inherit the Wind (1968)
- Colours (1969)
- Blue Pacific (1969)
- Loony Tunes (1969)
- TV Suite Vol 2 (1970, with Johnny Hawksworth)
- Sweet Chariot and Friends (1970)
- Key Largo (1970)
- Tilsley Orchestral 9 (1970, De Wolfe, with Reg Tilsley and Dick Bradford)
- Sunspots (1971, with Johnny Hawksworth)
- Sit Back (1971, Hudson Music)
- Illinois (1971)
- Alibi (1971, with Johnny Hawksworth)
- Restless Woman (1971)
- Times Two (1971, with Keith Papworth)
- Afro-Rock (1971, as Vecchio)
- Native Rhymes (1972)
- Here and there (1972)
- Meatball Jack (1972)
- Wheel of Fortune (1972, with Reg Tilsley)
- Great Day (1972, with Simon Haseley)
- Quartet of Modern Jazz Vol.2 (1972)
- Tete a Tete (1972, with Reg Wale, and Simon Haseley)
- City Scene (1972, with Keith Papworth and Jack Trombey)
- Junction (1973)
- Synthesizer Contact (1973)
- Syndrome (1973, with Reg Tilsley)
- Hot Breath (1974, Hudson Music, with Reg Tilsley)
- Super Ride (1974, with Barry Stoller)
