= The Gods Must Be Crazy (soundtrack) =

Soundtrack album by Johnny Boshoff, Jack Trombey, Fred Mann
- Released: 1985
- Genre: Soundtrack, Library Music
- Length: 25:19
- Label: Varèse Sarabande

The Gods Must Be Crazy (soundtrack) is the soundtrack album to the 1980 film of the same name. The original soundtrack erroneously credits all of the music for the film to Johnny Boshoff. Many of the musical contributions appearing in the film were composed by Jack Trombey (a pseudonym for Dutch composer Jan Stoeckart) and feature Fred Mann playing the pan pipes, but were never attributed on the record sleeve. Trombey's compositions were derived from De Wolfe Music's 1977 library music release "The Good Earth".

== Track listing ==
The track listing and updated attributions are as follows:

1. "Music of the Gods (1st Version)" by J. Trombey (originally titled "Jan's Box of Tricks")
2. "The Song of the Shepherd" by J. Trombey
3. "The Escape of Sam Boga's Rebels" by J. Boshoff
4. "Andrew Picks Up Kate at the Bus" by J. Boshoff
5. "Music of the Gods (2nd version)" by J. Trombey
6. "Children of the Kalahari" (traditional)
7. "Give Me a Moment" by J. Boshoff [appears in film at 1:01:28]
8. "Do You Want to Dance That Rock 'n Roll" by J. Boshoff [appears in film at 59:30]
9. "Walk in the Bush (The Hostages)" (traditional)
10. "The Songs of the Shepherd (Finale)" by J. Trombey

== Additional music ==
Additional music from the film that does not appear in the official soundtrack release include:

- John Fiddy's "The Weeks Work A (Main)", from the album Industrial Themes & Underscores Vol. 1, features early in the film during scenes which serve to contrast the hustle and bustle of city life against the peaceful lives of the Kalahari Bushmen.
- In one of the film's most memorable scenes, main character Xi innocently reaches for a rifle to get the attention of a man who is playing mbira and singing "Amai Vachauya (The Mother Will Come)". The song was written by Jege A. Tapera [b. circa 1905, d. unknown] and "is a mourning song composed especially for his wife, Maggie [deceased 1949], whose loss must have affected him deeply". The lyrics translate to Mother will come; will come and see; will come and see this poor man, yuwi uye yuye iye iyuwe. Ethnomusicologist Andrew Tracey thoroughly documented Tapera's music in 1961, elaborating that when he knew Tapera, he "was a clothing factory worker in Bulawayo, Southern Rhodesia, but, first and foremost, he held himself to be a muridzi wembira, an mbira player". The recording of "Amai Vachauya" used in The Gods Must Be Crazy was taken from Jamie Uys' 1965 film Dingaka, in which it was retitled "Down-And-Out Song", and attributed to Ken Gampu, Sophie Mgcina, Thandi, Jimmy Sabe, John Sithebe and The Company.
