= Van der Valk =

British TV crime drama (1972–1992)

- DVD box set
- Genre: Crime drama; Mystery
- Created by: Nicolas Freeling
- Starring: Barry Foster; Michael Latimer; Susan Travers; Martin Wyldeck; Sydney Tafler; Joanna Dunham; Nigel Stock; Meg Davies; Richard Huw; Ronald Hines
- Theme music composer: Jack Trombey
- Opening theme: "Eye Level"
- Country of origin: United Kingdom
- Original language: English
- No. of series: 5
- No. of episodes: 32 (list of episodes)

Production
- Executive producers: Lloyd Shirley; George Taylor; Brian Walcroft
- Producers: Geoffrey Gilbert; Robert Love; Michael Chapman
- Production location: Netherlands
- Cinematography: Dusty Miller; Roy Pointer; Colin Munn
- Editors: John S. Smith; Ian Toynton; Ralph Sheldon
- Running time: 60 minutes (Series 1–3); 120 minutes (Series 4–5)
- Production companies: Thames Television; Euston Films; Elmgate Productions

Original release
- Network: ITV
- Release: 13 September 1972 – 19 February 1992

Van der Valk is a British television crime drama series produced for the ITV network by Thames Television. It ran from 13 September 1972 to 19 February 1992, with the first three series produced between 1972 and 1977, and two more being commissioned in 1991 and 1992.

The series was created by Nicolas Freeling, based on his novels about a detective in Amsterdam. It starred Barry Foster in the role of titular character Simon "Piet" van der Valk.

== Cast and characters ==
- Barry Foster as Commissaris Simon "Piet" van der Valk
- Michael Latimer as Inspecteur Johnny Kroon (Series 1–2)
- Susan Travers as Arlette van der Valk (Series 1–2)
- Joanna Dunham as Arlette van der Valk (Series 3)
- Meg Davies as Arlette van der Valk (Series 4–5)
- Martin Wyldeck as Hoofd-commissaris Samson (Series 1)
- Nigel Stock as Hoofd-commissaris Samson (Series 3)
- Ronald Hines as Hoofd-commissaris Samson (Series 4–5)
- Sydney Tafler as Hoofd-commissaris Halsbeek (Series 2)
- Richard Huw as Wim van der Valk (Series 4–5)
- Dave Carter as Brigadier Stribos (Series 1–2)
- Natasha Pyne as Janet (Series 4–5)
- Alan Haines as Brigadier Mertens (Series 1)

== Background and production ==
The show was produced by Thames Television for the ITV network. The first two series were produced in 1971 and 1972, followed by a third in 1977, with two more being commissioned in 1991 and 1992.

The first and second series, of 6 and 7 one-hour episodes respectively, were recorded on 2" quadruplex videotape at Thames' Teddington Studios in London, with location scenes shot in Amsterdam on 16mm film.

The third series of 12 episodes, again of one hour in length, was generally made on location, entirely on 16mm film, by Thames's subsidiary Euston Films.

The fourth series and fifth series, of four and three two-hour episodes, were produced by Elmgate Productions, and also entirely shot on 35mm film. They were also entirely shot on location in the Netherlands and were transmitted in stereo sound using the NICAM system.

=== Setting and characters ===
The television series was based on the characters and atmosphere, but not the plots, of the original novels. The stories mostly take place in and around Amsterdam, where Commissaris van der Valk is a cynical yet intuitive detective. Drugs, sex and murder are among the gritty themes of the casework, presented in contrast to the picturesque locations and the upbeat theme music.

In the opening credits of the first series, Van der Valk is standing inside the tower of the Westerkerk.

In the first two series Van der Valk contrasts with his naïve assistant, Inspecteur Johnny Kroon, played by Michael Latimer, and his superior, Hoofd-commissaris Samson, who deals with the political fallout of the cases. The fourth series and fifth series portrayed a more senior Van der Valk and introduced a son, Wim, also an Amsterdam detective. Samson was played by three actors over the course of the show: Martin Wyldeck for two episodes in 1972, Nigel Stock for 12 episodes in 1977, and Ronald Hines for the revival in 1991–92. Van der Valk's French wife Arlette was played by three actresses over the course of the show's twenty-year run: initially by Susan Travers, Joanna Dunham for the third series, and finally Meg Davies for the revival in 1991–92. Other actors included Sydney Tafler, as Hoofd-commissaris Halsbeek, and Alan Haines and Dave Carter, who played uniformed officers Mertens and Stribos. In the revival Richard Huw, played Van der Valk's son Wim, and Natasha Pyne his secretary, Janet.

=== Locations ===
Series 1 and 2 are set at the Art Nouveau Politiebureau no. 14 at Leidseplein 15, while series 3 to 5 show the Amsterdam police headquarters at Marnixstraat 260-264.

- S01 E01 "One Herring's Not Enough": Schiller Hotel (Rembrandtplein)
- S01 E02 "Destroying Angel": Stadsschouwburg, Apollo Hotel, Aerdenhout, Zandvoort beach
- S01 E06 "The Adventurer": Westerkerk, d’Vijff Vlieghen (Spuistraat 294), Apollo Hotel
- S02 E01 "A Death by the Sea": Bonebakker jeweller's (Rokin 88-99)
- S02 E02 "A Man of No Importance": Demka-spoorbrug over the Amsterdam-Rijnkanaal, Magere Brug, Waterlooplein market, Mozes en Aäronkerk, Centraal station, De Oude Prins, Amstelzijde 37 (now Loetje aan de Amstel) and ‘Antiek O.V. Kemeling’, Amstelzijde 33, Ouderkerk
- S02 E03 "A Rose from Mr Reinhardt": Beatrixpark, Rembrandtplein, De Wallen
- S02 E04 "A Dangerous Point of View": university courtyard, Albert Cuyp Market, Taanplaats (Spaarndam), Slokop windmill (Spaarndam)
- S02 E05 "Season for Love": Schiphol, De Krijtberg church, shop at Singel 419 and café at Singel 415
- S02 E06 "Rich Man, Poor Man": Sloterdijkerbrug, Galgenstraat & Prinseneiland 22
- S03 E01 "Enemy": Car chase along Oostenburgergracht, nl:Dageraadsbrug (nl), De Gooyer, Funenkade, Zeeburgerpad, Panamalaan, Nieuwe Entrepotdokschutsluis, nl:Brug 352 (nl), Cruquiusweg loading ramp, Pakhuis Koning Willem I
- S03 E05 "Man of Iron": Paradiso, Weteringschans 6, Entrepotdok
- S03 E03 "The Runt": Montelbaanstoren, Zuider IJdijk, Syphonsluis bij het nl:Gemaal Zeeburg, Amsterdamse Brug, Kalkmarkt 5
- S03 E04 "Wolf": Lijnbaansgracht 11, Leidsestraat, nl:Reynders (café), Magere Brug, Vondelpark, Dam
- S03 E06 "Everybody Does It": Victoria Hotel, Werfmolern De Kat (Zaanse Schans), NDSM, National Monument (Dam Square)
- S03 E07 "Face Value": Schiphol, Okura Hotel (Ferdinand Bolstraat), De Derde Bocht (Durgerdammerdijk), Prinz Snackbar-Restaurant (Ceintuurbaan 350) and chase across Ceintuurbaan-Sarphatipark junction, Prinsengracht 180 (H Keijzer koffie- en theehadnel), 172 (Dian) & 168 (De Eike Boom gallery)
- S03 E08 "Dead on Arrival": Heathrow Airport, Victoria Embankment, London
- S03 E09 "The Professor": American Hotel, Sportshop Roelvink (Amsterdamseweg 506, Amstelveen), university quad, Oudemanhuispoort, Molen de Dikkert (Amsterdamseweg 104a, Amstelveen), Kortjewantsbrug and underpass, Nederlands Scheepvaartmuseum (Postgebouw in background)
- S03 E10 "In Hazard": Houthaven, Dam
- S03 E11 "Gold Plated Delinquents": Kadijksplein, Pontsteiger-Distelweg car ferry
- S03 E12 "Diane": De Oude Smidse (Oudekerk), Rembrandt statue by Riekermolen, Paulus Potterstraat, Museumplein highway (in place 1953-1997), Reguliersbreestraat 44 (then Café Otten, now Burgerfabriek)
- S04 E02 Dangerous Games: Houthaven car ferry, Silodam, Durgerdam, Multatuli statue (Torensluis), Artis, Groote Zeesluis (Muiden), Muidersloot, Oude Kerk, De Ruijterkade, Loods 6 (KNSM Island)
- S04 E03 "A Sudden Silence": Kurhaus (Scheveningen), Rijksmuseum, Binnenhof, Kamer van Koophandel, Sloterdijk station, Jaagpad/Punterspad (Nieuwe Meer), Hoogte Kadijk/Matrozenhof
- S04 E04 "The Little Rascals": Noorderkerk, Prinsensluis, Silodam, Haarlemmer Houttuinen, Ketelmakerstraat cycle bridge – [illogical route] – Petermayersbrug, Zandhoek 9-1, Spui, Oudemanhuispoort book market, Radhuisstraat
- S05 E01 "The Ties that Bind": roof of Grand Hotel Krasnapolsky (Dam Square), Restaurant Luden (Spuistraat 108), roof of Spuistraat 281, Hilton Hotel (Apollolaan), Herengracht 541
- S05 E02 "Proof of Life": Laagte Kadijk, Waterlooplein market, metro to Centraal, Muiderpoortstation, Oude Kerk
- S05 E03 "Still Waters": landing stage on Snoekjesgracht, Kromboomsloot, Stopera, under Oostertoegangsspoorbrug, Toetsenbordweg (Western Harbour)
- The Four Oaks Mystery: Ambassade Hotel (Herengracht 229), Nijlpaardenbrug (Entrepotdok)

== Series overview ==
Series	Episodes	Originally released	
Series	Episodes	First released	Last released
1	6	13 September 1972	18 October 1972
2	7	29 August 1973	10 October 1973
3	12	5 September 1977	21 November 1977
4	4	16 January 1991	6 February 1991
5	3	5 February 1992	19 February 1992

== Episodes ==
=== Series 1 (1972) ===
No. in series	Title	Directed by	Written by	Original release date
1	"One Herring's Not Enough"	Dennis Vance	Michael Chapman	13 September 1972
When a man confesses to the double murder of his wife and her lover it seems an open-and-shut case; but as one part after another of the man's story does not check out, Van der Valk realises he is dealing with something far more complicated - the murder was committed seven years earlier.
2	"Destroying Angel"	Graham Evans	Michael Chapman	20 September 1972
A man is found dead in his room above a sleazy bar and brothel. Van der Valk is called in when the examining doctor suspects poisoning. Immediately sensing there is more to the case than meets the eye, he uncovers a complicated web involving drug dealing and the grubbier end of Amsterdam's S & M industry. Ultimately though, he finds the motive for the man's murder may lay elsewhere and that "Destroying Angel" is definitely involved; but who, or what, is that?
3	"Blue Notes"	Marc Miller	Geoffrey Gilbert	27 September 1972
When Jan Servaas, a world-famous Dutch violinist, makes a rare concert appearance in his home country it is an eagerly awaited event. In the weeks leading up to the concert Van der Valk receives a series of mysterious notes, written on blue paper, warning that Servaas will be "executed" if he comes to Amsterdam. Van der Valk ignores Kroon's pleas to have the concert canceled until the case is solved, perhaps in part because he and Arlette have tickets and are looking forward to it! It is a decision that will have tragic consequences as a drama which began with betrayal in wartime Limburg plays out to a fatal conclusion in 1970s Amsterdam.
4	"Elected Silence"	Douglas Camfield	Geoffrey Gilbert	4 October 1972
Officers investigating a hearse abandoned near the Royal Palace make a bizarre discovery which appears to be a threat against Paul Harkemer, well-known editor of a right-wing magazine, and/or his 19-year-old daughter. At first it appears that it may be nothing more than a publicity stunt for the left-wing rock band Emerald Scorpion, and Harkemer himself seems totally unconcerned. The case seems to be over before it began, but then the police receive a cassette tape from someone claiming to be the kidnapper of Harkemer's daughter.
5	"Thicker Than Water"	David Wickes	Geoffrey Gilbert	11 October 1972
A body dredged up from a canal is tentatively identified as the son of a British MP, but when she views the body she says it is not her son. Van der Valk refuses to believe this and calls on his British colleagues to help prove the boy's identity. The boy's face is well-known in Amsterdam's transvestite and transsexual scene, and Van der Valk's inquiries there lead him deeper and deeper into a dark world of sexual depravity and exploitation involving some of the most prominent public figures in Europe. Samson desperately advises him to proceed with extreme caution. In the face of the mother's refusal to co-operate, Van der Valk finds his best hope is to look elsewhere in the family for help.
6	"The Adventurer"	Peter Duguid	Michael Chapman	18 October 1972
Why would German Wolf Gebhardt (Paul Eddington) decide, in middle age, to take up an apprenticeship in stonemasonry in Amsterdam? Why would a man killed in a car accident be carrying a newspaper cutting with a photo of Gebhardt? Van der Valk senses that Gebhardt is in danger and even attempts to have him taken into protective custody when he refuses to co-operate with inquiries. Short on options, Van der Valk makes a fatal misjudgement before he finally unravels this complex and frustrating case.

=== Series 2 (1973) ===
No. in series	Title	Directed by	Written by	Original release date
1	"A Death by the Sea"	Don Leaver	Philip Broadley	29 August 1973
Van Teesling (Patrick Allen), a wealthy and influential banker, is found unconscious in his car on the beach. He tells police that the night before he and his wife went for a drunken midnight swim. His wife drowned while he barely escaped with his life. Van der Valk's nose is twitching, but he is put under pressure not to pursue the case. When Kroon discovers that Van Teesling is a former Olympic swimmer, Van der Valk is convinced that he staged the incident to get rid of his wife. Van der Valk is determined to use any means to ensure that justice is done.
2	"A Man of No Importance"	Douglas Camfield	Arden Winch	5 September 1973
Van der Valk investigates when the body of a man wearing only pyjama trousers is discovered on a canal barge.
3	"A Rose from Mr. Reinhart"	Mike Vardy	Peter Yeldham	12 September 1973
Arlette van der Valk is concerned about the safety of Karen Seger, an attractive young woman that she and the children know from visits to the park. She asks her husband to meet the woman and consider whether she might need police protection.
4	"A Dangerous Point of View"	Jim Goddard	Jeremy Paul	19 September 1973
The body of a man who has been stabbed to death is discovered in a flat. Van der Valk must find out why the dead man was there and who could have known about it.
5	"Season for Love"	Mike Vardy	Philip Broadley	26 September 1973
Van der Valk agrees to help a rich American woman (Lisa Daniely) who is looking for a young man who has gone missing in Amsterdam, but soon discovers that it is the woman who may be in real danger.
6	"Rich Man, Poor Man"	Douglas Camfield	David Butler	3 October 1973
A worker at a firm that reconditions farm machinery is injured in an explosion at the premises. The man insists he caused the accident himself, but van der Valk is convinced that he is covering up the truth.
7	"The Rainbow Ends Here"	Graham Evans	Philip Broadley	10 October 1973
The sister of tycoon Evert Stolle is kidnapped, but her brother does not want the police to get involved.

=== Series 3 (1977) ===
No. in series	Title	Directed by	Written by	Original release date
1	"Enemy"	Mike Vardy	Paul Wheeler	5 September 1977
The lives of Piet and Arlette van der Valk are threatened. (This episode was repeated on ITV as part of the Thames 21st Birthday celebrations in 1989.)
2	"Accidental"	Tom Clegg	Ted Childs	12 September 1977
An international scandal over charges of corruption in high places emerges, and the chief prosecutor disappears.
3	"The Runt"	Mike Vardy	Leslie Sands	19 September 1977
A likeable rogue, a small-time thief and con-man, for whom Van der Valk develops a grudging affection. But the thief suddenly becomes wealthy and also seems to be connected with an important family. The pressures are on Van der Valk to find out why, but without embarrassing too many people.
4	"Wolf"	Mike Vardy	Philip Broadley	26 September 1977
A young German is murdered in his bed. The apartment is littered with clues. For Van der Valk there is a clue too many.
5	"Man of Iron"	William Brayne	Michael Chapman	3 October 1977
When one of Van der Valk's close friends suffers a series of apparently pointless attacks, he finds himself looking for a mysterious hidden enemy who could strike at any second.
6	"Everybody Does It"	Ben Bolt	Philip Broadley	10 October 1977
Arlette van der Valk picks up a dubious bargain and inadvertently gets her husband caught up with a crime syndicate.
7	"Face Value"	Mike Vardy	Robert Wales	17 October 1977
Van der Valk investigates a case of forgery and uncovers a dead artist and a strange collection of pictures.
8	"Dead on Arrival"	Ted Childs	Patrick O'Brian	24 October 1977
A Dutch clairvoyant is invited to Britain to assist with an old murder investigation. Bob Hoskins had a role in this episode, shot entirely at Heathrow and London.
9	"The Professor"	Ted Childs	Roger Marshall	31 October 1977
A university professor, using a false name, is found shot dead in a hotel room. Van der Valk discovers the professors has been taking sexual advantage of his students and taking photographs of them.
10	"In Hazard"	William Brayne	Paul Wheeler	7 November 1977
Van der Valk has reason to doubt a beautiful woman's story.
11	"Gold Plated Delinquents"	Tom Clegg	Roger Marshall	14 November 1977
Some spoiled rich kids in search of new thrills cause a headache for Van der Valk.
12	"Diane"	Mike Vardy	Philip Broadley	21 November 1977
A woman who has been trying to escape the past finds that it catches up with her in Amsterdam. Actress Jane Merrow was the guest.

=== Series 4 (1991) ===
No. in series	Title	Directed by	Written by	Original release date
1	"Doctor Hoffman's Children"	Anthony Simmons	Jonathan Hales	16 January 1991
Van der Valk investigates a series of murders, including a fall, a burning, a drowning, a dog attack and a shooting, all echoing stories from Struwwelpeter. He discovers that all of the victims attended the same village school during the Second World War and links them all to a tragic death during the Hunger Winter of 1944.
2	"Dangerous Games"	Jim Goddard	Don Shaw	23 January 1991
Van der Valk plays cat-and-mouse with a leaker in police headquarters after his son Wim is accused of leaking vital police intelligence.
3	"A Sudden Silence"	Herbert Wise	Keith Dewhurst	30 January 1991
Government minister Van Hoorn is killed as he attempts to flee the country. Van der Valk discovers that Van Hoorn had a secret identity and had been accepting bribes. He interrogates Van Hoorn's wife Melanie forcefully, but she does not reveal the identity of her husband's killer, a young research assistant who had fallen in love with her. Van der Valk suspects that she has incited the killer, but Samson instructs him to drop the case. As far as Samson is concerned, the case has been successfully closed, and press interest will soon quiet down. However, the murder of Van Hoorn's gay lover, machine-gunned from a counterfeit police car, is left unresolved on Dirk Boutsen's caseload.
4	"The Little Rascals"	Alan Cooke	Peter Buckman	6 February 1991
An aging alternative comedian has been strangled. Van der Valk finds his investigation into the murder hampered at every turn. The body of the comedian's widow is fished out of a canal. The manager of the club where the comedian worked is the next to die. All three had been members of a society known as the Little Rascals at university, and other members find themselves the targets of a series of attacks. Van der Valk investigates and worries about a young woman whose parents have been affected by the incidents.

=== Series 5 (1992) ===
No. in series	Title	Directed by	Written by	Original release date
1	"The Ties That Bind"	Anthony Simmons	Kenneth Ware	5 February 1992
The wife of a diamond merchant is shot and killed as she leaves a restaurant. Meanwhile, a former judge is shot dead and Van der Valk is brought in to solve the case. A suspect is apprehended, but confesses that someone else got to the judge first. Moreover, what is the connection between the judge's killing and a drug case Wim is investigating?
2	"Proof of Life"	Tom Clegg	Keith Dewhurst	12 February 1992
When a businessman and his son are kidnapped, Van der Valk must establish whether the man's wife is involved.
3	"Still Waters"	Herbert Wise	Stuart Hepburn	19 February 1992
A new sea barrier is at the centre of a row between senior Dutch politicians and the radical Green Party. When the row leads to murder, van der Valk is called in to investigate.

== Other media ==
=== Soundtrack ===
The signature theme, "Eye Level", was composed by Jack Trombey (a pseudonym of Dutch composer Jan Stoeckart) and was performed by the Simon Park Orchestra. It reached number one on the UK Singles Chart in 1973. Also that year, Matt Monro charted with a vocal version titled "And You Smiled". In the final TV series, the theme was played at a slightly faster tempo than previously.

=== Home media ===
Van der Valk Season 1 was released on DVD in Region 2 in 2002.Part 3 & Part 4 on dvd Have been mislabeled by Clear Vision as Series 1 but are actually Series 2. The remaining seasons 3-5 were not released until "The Complete Series" box set by Network on 22 October 2007. Network re-released the box set on 20 August 2018. In Region 4, Shock Entertainment released "The Complete Collection" box set on 18 September 2013, and was re-released by Via Vision Entertainment on 2 June 2021.

DVD Releases
Season	Region 1	Region 2	Region 4
1–5	TBA	Clear Vision Series 1 & 2 22 July 2002 22 October 2007 Network 20 August 2018 (Network)	18 September 2013 (Shock Entertainment) 2 June 2021 (Via Vision Entertainment)
