= Simon Park Orchestra =

Music group

The Simon Park Orchestra is a group best remembered for performing "Eye Level", the theme tune for the television series Van der Valk composed by Jan Stoeckart, which spent four weeks at the number one position in the UK Singles Chart in September 1973. The song also peaked at number 13 in Australia.

Simon Park was born on 14 March 1946 in Market Harborough, England, the son of architect Ronald Stewart Park (1921–1985). He learned to play the organ as a child and went on to study at Worcester College, Oxford, where he gained a Bachelor of Arts degree in music. Park began composing and conducting orchestral music for the De Wolfe music library from the early 1970s, and over the years has produced some 1,400 tracks for them. He also composed under the name Simon Haseley.

Following the success of "Eye Level", (which was arranged and conducted by Park but not one of his own compositions) Columbia released two mainstream Simon Park Orchestra albums: Something in the Air and Venus Fly Trap. However, no other tracks achieved the success of "Eye Level". In 1988, Surrey House Music released two more albums, Simon Park & His Orchestra, Volume 1 and Simon Park & His Orchestra, Volume 2, which contain instrumental versions of pop hits.

== Library music ==
With Cliff Twemlow and Peter Taylor, Park co-wrote "Distant Hills", which was used as the closing theme tune to the television series Crown Court (1972–84). He wrote the music for the 1972 ITV mystery quiz Whodunnit?, for Cross Country Go, a B movie made by British Movietone News in 1974, and incidental music for the wartime TV series Danger UXB in 1979. As Simon Haseley he contributed incidental music to the TV series The Sweeney (1975–78).

He has continued to produce music for the De Wolfe music library, some of which was used in films such as Eskimo Nell (1975), and he composed the score for the film Nutcracker (1982). His music has also been used by NFL Films in football highlight compilations.

His library music has also been heard in more recent productions, such as Ever After (1998), Spun (2002) and Shaun of the Dead (2004). The 1972 piece "Hammerhead" (credited to Simon Haseley), which was scored for large orchestra, has been sampled many times, including by Beyonce in A Woman Like Me, as used in the 2006 film The Pink Panther.

Park appeared in an episode of Bargain Hunt which aired in 2017.
