= Burnage Academy for Boys =

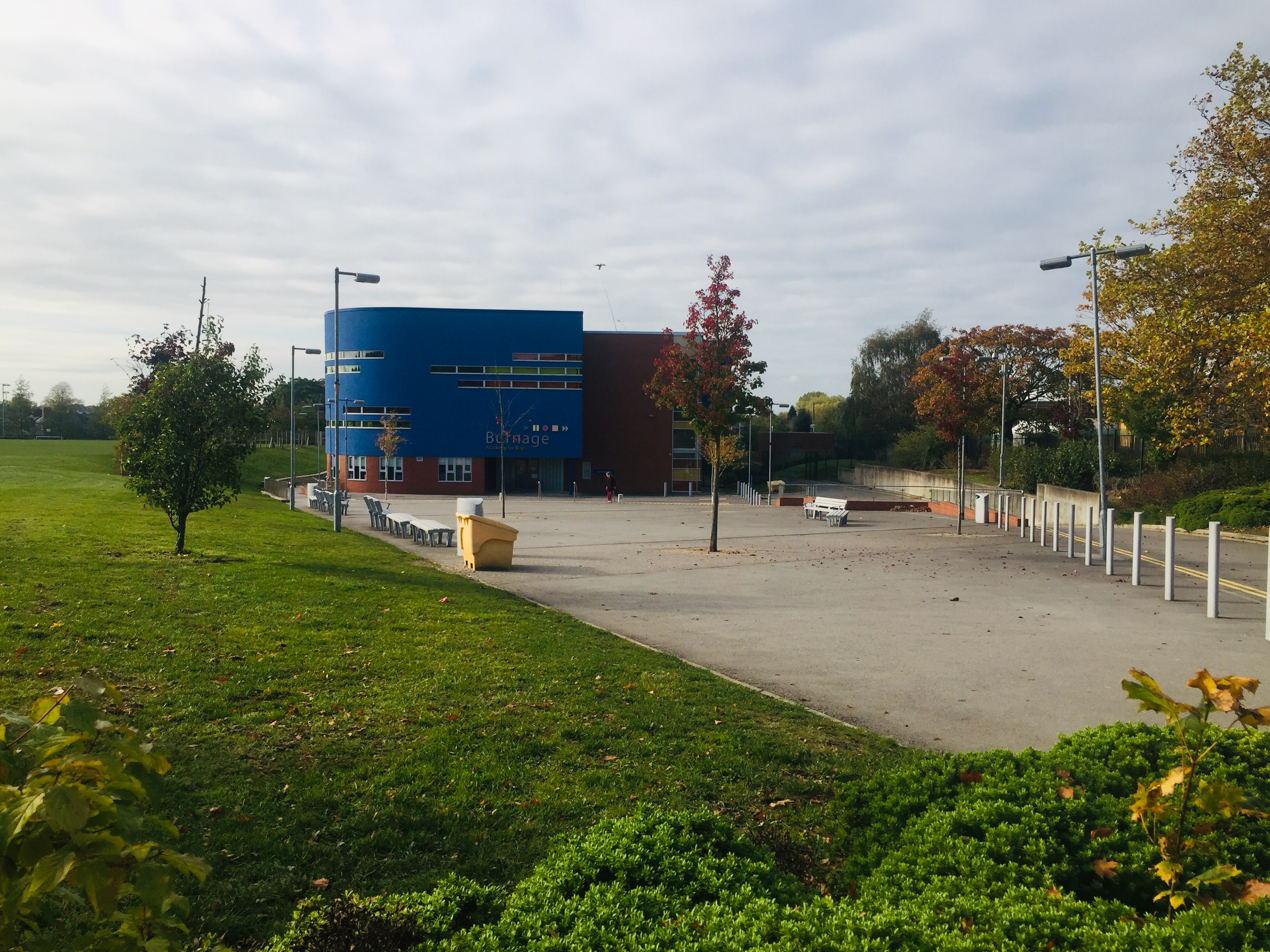
- School badge Part of Burnage Academy for Boys building

Location
- Burnage Lane; Manchester, M19 1ER; England; 53.4275°N 2.2033°W

Information
- Type: 11–16 boys Academy
- Motto: Be The Best That You Can Be
- Established: 1932
- Local authority: Manchester City Council
- Department for Education URN: 140703 Tables
- Ofsted: Reports
- Head teacher: Karl Harrison
- Staff: 120
- Gender: Boys
- Age: 11 to 16
- Enrolment: 900
- Houses: Ash, Oak, Maple, Rowan
- Website: burnage.manchester.sch.uk

Burnage Academy for Boys, formerly known as Burnage High School for Boys, is an 11–16 boys secondary school with academy status, located in Burnage, Manchester, England. The school was founded in September 1932 as Burnage High School on its current site on Burnage Lane. At a ceremony on 21 October 1932, the school was officially opened by Sir Boyd Merriman.

In 1967, Burnage Grammar School became a non-selective comprehensive and later became Burnage High School for Boys following merger with Ladybarn Secondary Modern School, which was on nearby Briarfield Road/Parrs Wood Road, in Withington.

== History ==
=== Grammar school ===
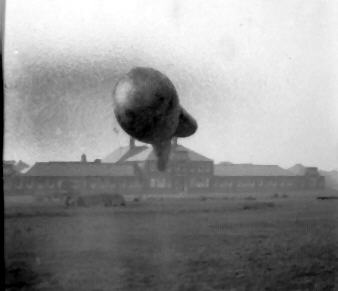
Burnage High School photographed in 1942, with a barrage balloon in the sports field

The school was founded in September 1932 as Burnage High School on its current site on Burnage Lane. At a ceremony on 21 October 1932, the school was officially opened by Sir Boyd Merriman and the school choir performed Edvard Grieg's "Song of Olav Trygvason". In the early years, the school was organised around the house system, sports teams were formed and a school magazine was printed. A number of school plays were staged, including Ambrose Applejohn's Adventure, Dr. Knock, Seven Keys to Baldpate and The Anatomist, nurturing young acting talent such as that of Alan Badel, who later went on to appear on stage, film and television.

Upon the outbreak of World War II in 1939, most pupils were evacuated to towns outside Manchester to avoid the hazards of bombing, and Burnage boys were sent to Leek, Ashbourne and Wirksworth. Many former pupils of the school served in the forces during the war and 50 old boys were killed in action, later commemorated in a memorial plaque in the school hall. Luftwaffe bombs were dropped on Burnage during the Manchester Blitz, and Burnage school was hit by three bombs, causing severe damage to the school hall and demolishing the organ. The school's first headmaster, Mr Albert H. R. Ball, left in 1942 to take up the position of Rector of the Royal High School in Edinburgh.

After the war, the hall was repaired, and several years later was the organ was replaced. Around 1950 the school was given Grammar School status with the traditional grammar school ethos and curriculum. In 1958, a four-storey concrete building was added at the rear of the old buildings. This building accommodated extra classrooms (following the post-war baby-boom) with the art rooms on the top floor. In the late-1950s to mid-'60s, the school was highly rated and competition for places was strong.

=== Comprehensive school ===
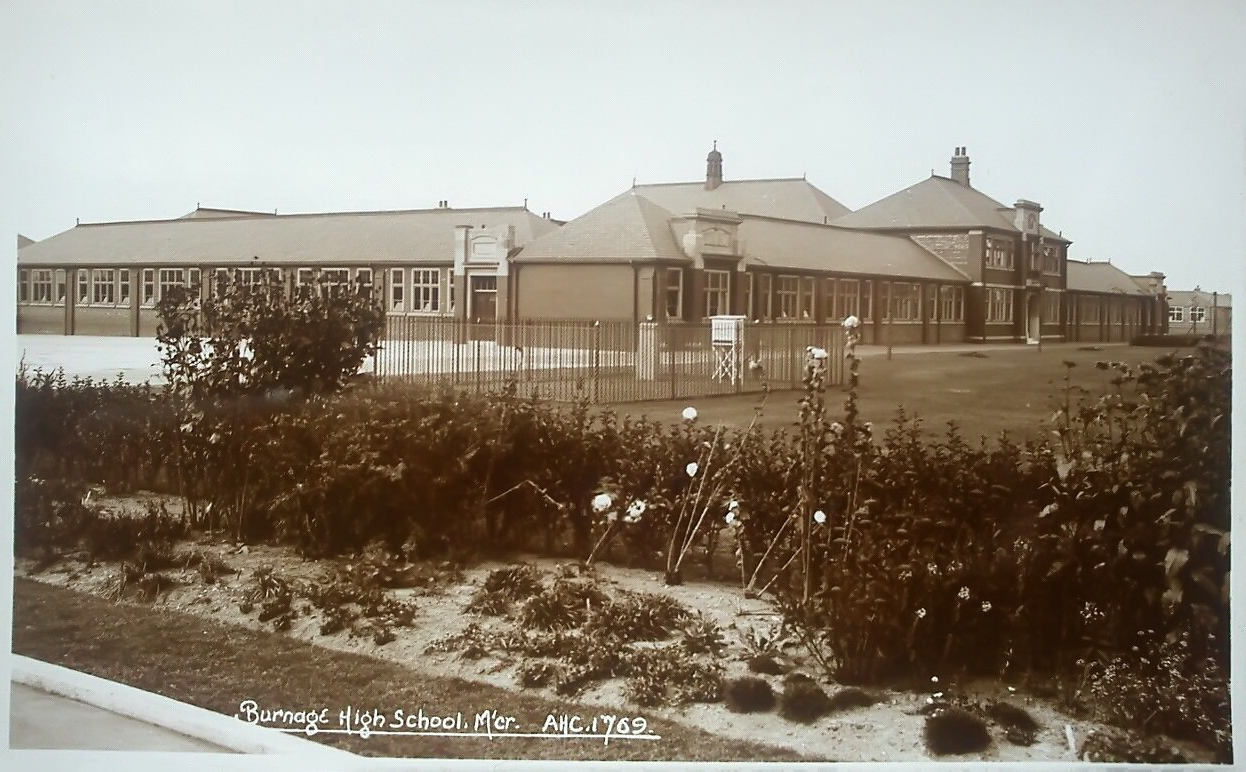
The original Upper School building as it appeared in the 1950s

In 1967, Burnage Grammar School became a non-selective comprehensive, at a time when most grammar schools in Manchester were being disestablished following the abolition of the Tripartite System in British schools. It became Burnage High School for Boys and merged with Ladybarn Secondary Modern School, which was on nearby Briarfield Road/Parrs Wood Road, in Withington. The Briarfield/Parrs Wood Road site then became the lower school (for years 7 to 9) while the Burnage Lane site remained the upper school (for years 10 and 11 plus the sixth form).

In 1969 the school purchased a disused railway station, Buxworth in Derbyshire, and converted it for use as an outdoor education centre for pupils.

=== Media Arts College ===
In 2007, the school was given Media Arts College status and was renamed as Burnage Media Arts College in 2008. Despite this change, it remained an all-boys school for 11–16-year-olds.

In 2010, the school was reconstructed under the Building Schools for the Future initiative which saw the original 1930s and 1950s buildings replaced by a new building. The 1999 building was refurbished and the Sports Hall (built in 2001) was also improved with a new gymnasium. Upon completion of the new main building, the old buildings were demolished and the grounds they once stood on were resurfaced to provide all-weather sports facilities.

=== Academy status ===
Previously a community school administered by Manchester City Council, Burnage Media Arts College converted to academy status on 1 April 2014 and was renamed Burnage Academy for Boys, however, the school continues to co-ordinate with Manchester City Council for admissions.

== Headmasters ==
- 1932–1942: Albert H. R. Ball (later Rector of the Royal High School, Edinburgh (1942–1948) and headmaster of Methodist College Belfast (1948–1960))
- 1942–1959: T. P. Spencer
- 1959–1977: S. Hughes CBE
- 1977–1981: J. G. Marshall
- 1981–1988: Dr G. Gough
- 1988–1995: D. A. Blackwell
- 1995–2000: A. W. Hill
- 2000: J. J. Hill
- 2001–2020: Ian Fenn
- 2020–current: Karl Harrison

== School overview ==
=== Admissions ===
The school draws pupils from various districts of Manchester, including Didsbury, Levenshulme, Longsight, Rusholme, Fallowfield, Withington, Hulme, Ardwick, and Burnage itself. The majority of students live in Longsight, Levenshulme, Rusholme and Ardwick wards, which suffer from high levels of poverty, deprivation, and crime. As mentioned in its 2010 OFSTED report, over 90% of the school's students are from ethnic minorities, and over 64% are of South Asian heritage with more than 50% of all students speaking English as an additional language.

=== Academic attainment ===
In the school's 2018 OFSTED report, it was noted that pupils make excellent progress and achieve consistently strong results in their GCSE examinations. In 2018, Burnage pupils gained 29 grade 9s and a further 46 grade 8s between them.

In accordance to progress 8 score ('this score shows how much progress pupils at this school made between the end of key stage 2 and the end of key stage 4, compared to pupils across England who got similar results at the end of key stage 2') the school has the highest progress for boys in the north of England (+0.89).

=== Historical Academic attainment ===
In the school's 2002 OFSTED report, it was noted that overall examination grades for students at the school in recent years were well below the national average. The school has had consistently improving GCSE results since 2001 (with the exception of 2005 when results dipped, and in 2013 when there was a sharp drop). GCSE performance results as published by the Department for Children, Schools and Families (DCSF) since 2001 are as follows:

Percentage of students achieving 5 or more GCSE A* – C results or equivalent (national average for each year in brackets):

- 2001: 23% (50%)
- 2002: 33% (52%)
- 2003: 38% (53%)
- 2004: 42% (54%)
- 2005: 35% (56%)
- 2006: 38% (58%)
- 2007: 40% (61%)
- 2008: 50% (65%)

Percentage of students achieving 5 or more GCSE A* – C results including English and Maths (national average for each year in brackets):

- 2005: 27% (44%)
- 2006: 33% (46%)
- 2007: 28% (46%)
- 2008: 33% (48%)
- 2009: 40% (50%)
- 2010: 43% (54%)
- 2011: 50% (59%)
- 2012: 56% (59%)
- 2013: 43% (59%)

Percentage of students achieving 4 and above in English and Maths (new 9-1 grading):

- 2017:63%
- 2018:60%
- 2019:65%

== Controversies ==
In September 1986, the school made headline news when 13-year-old Asian pupil Ahmed Iqbal Ullah was fatally stabbed in the lower school playground by another 13-year-old pupil, Darren Coulburn, in what was believed to be a racially motivated attack. Coulburn, a juvenile delinquent who had already burned down the school art block in 1985 causing £50,000 of damage, was convicted of murder and detained indefinitely. The incident severely damaged the reputation of what was once a well-respected school in the district, and launched the MacDonald Inquiry into racism and violence in Manchester schools. The Ahmed Iqbal Ullah Race Relations Resource Centre, established in 1999, was named in Ullah's memory.

Between 2009 and 2011, Salman Ramadan Abedi, the perpetrator of the 2017 Manchester Arena bombing, attended the school. While attending he was among a group of students who accused a teacher of Islamophobia for criticising suicide bombing.

In 2009, the school made headline news when teacher Mohammed Sarwar was arrested after police had obtained evidence that he had been leading a double life as the mastermind behind a major local drugs gang who had a large-scale operation to deal cocaine and cannabis. Sarwar, who was known as "The Teacher" to his gang, had taught IT at the school for seven years until his arrest. In April 2011, he was convicted and sentenced to 21 years in prison.

In 2012, the school made headlines again when former supply teacher Mutasem Alqtaishat was arrested for fraud after he collected weekly payments from young players at a local basketball club that he coached at and deposited the payments into his personal account for his own use over a five-month period. Alqtaishat received a 13-week prison sentence (suspended for one year), and was ordered to pay £400 and perform 180 hours of unpaid community service. In 2013, he was also struck off by the Teaching Agency for a minimum period of two years.

== Notable former pupils ==
=== Burnage Academy for Boys ===
- Salman Abedi – suicide bomber in the Manchester Arena bombing
- Ahmed Halane – alleged former jihadist

=== Burnage High School for Boys ===
- Lamin Deen – Olympic bobsleigh competitor and soldier
- Wes Brown – former Manchester United and England footballer.
- Jim O'Neill, Baron O'Neill of Gatley – economist and government Minister
- Luthfur Rahman OBE – British Labour Party politician, councillor in the City of Manchester and Executive Member for Skills, Culture and Leisure in Manchester City Council.
- Aziz Ibrahim – guitarist (worked with Simply Red, the Stone Roses)
- Paul McGuigan – original Bass player with Oasis
- Brian Sterling-Vete – author, Guinness World Record Holder, motivational speaker, film-maker, TV presenter, actor, and entrepreneur.
- Menelik Watson – professional American football player (offensive tackle for the Oakland Raiders from 2013 to 2016, and Denver Broncos in 2017)
- David Bennett - Professional footballer, scored a goal in the 1987 FA Cup final

=== Burnage Grammar School for Boys ===
- Alan Badel – stage, film and television actor
- Roger Byrne – Manchester United and England footballer killed in the Munich air disaster
- Michael Croft – founder and Director of the National Youth Theatre
- Norman Foster, Baron Foster of Thames Bank – architect
- Sir Stephen Sherbourne CBE – Conservative political advisor
- Mike Smithson – editor (since 2004) of Politicalbetting.com
