= Auberge De Kieviet =

De Kievit
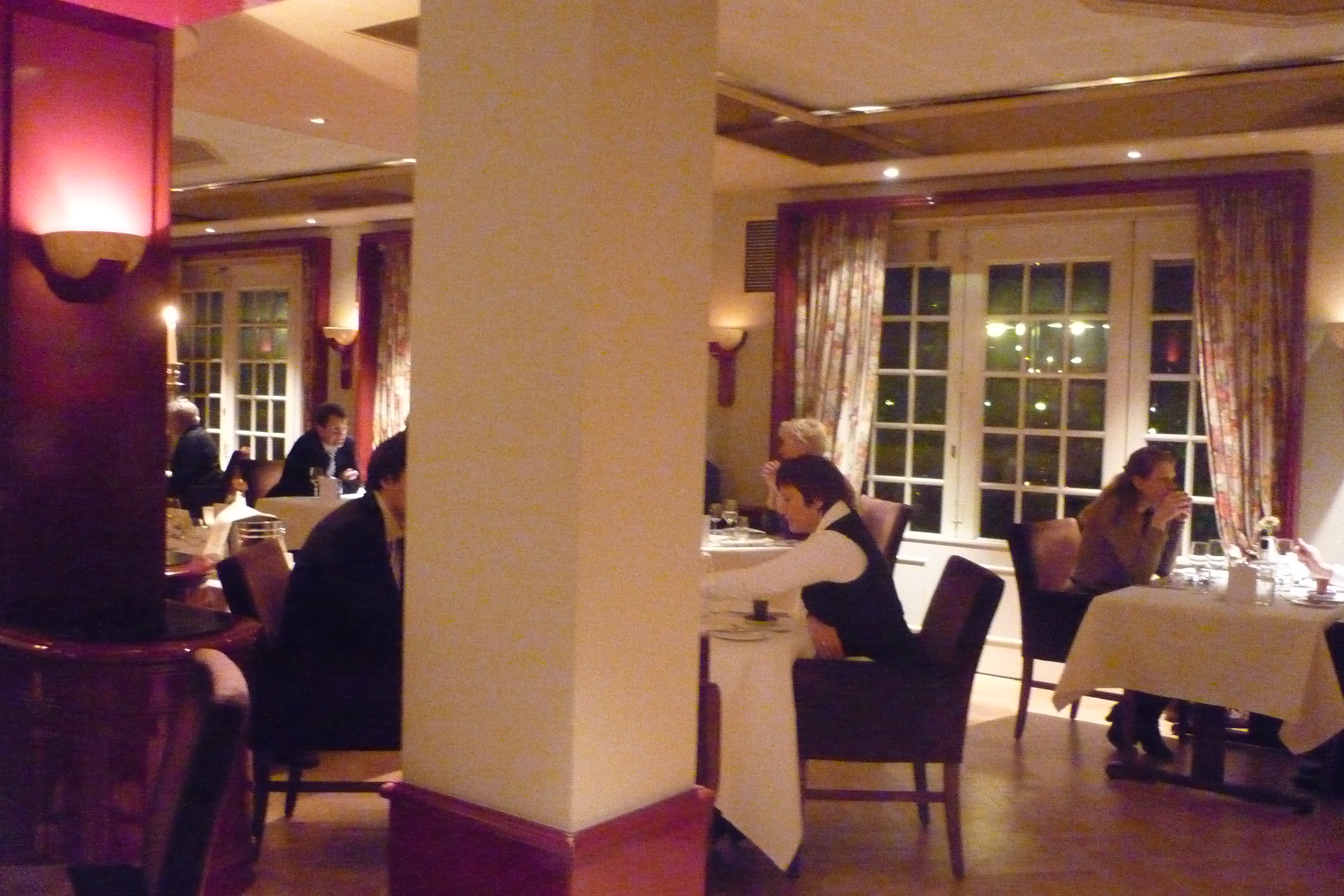
- Interactive map of De Kievit

Restaurant information
- Head chef: Andy Hendriks
- Food type: French
- Rating: Michelin Guide
- Location: Stoeplaan 27, Wassenaar, 2243 CX, Netherlands
- Coordinates: 52°7′22″N 4°21′47″E
- Seating capacity: 80
- Website: hoteldekieviet.nl

Auberge De Kieviet is a restaurant located in Wassenaar, Netherlands. It was a fine dining restaurant that was awarded one or two Michelin stars in the period 1961–1991. In 1986 the restaurant was sold to Bob Goudsmit, at that time already owner of Molen De Dikkert. In 1992, Goudsmit went bankrupt and with him both restaurants. During the bankruptcy, it was sold to Tartuffe Holding, the company that owned Vreugd en Rust. In 2006 the Fletcher Group took over the hotel and restaurant.

GaultMillau did not award any points.

== Star history ==
- 1961–1969: one star
- 1970–1972: two stars
- 1973: one star
- 1974–1975: no stars
- 1976–1985: one star
- 1986: no stars
- 1987–1991: one star

== See also ==
- List of Michelin starred restaurants in the Netherlands
