= Vete (disambiguation) =

"Vete" is a song by Bad Bunny.

Vete or VETE may also refer to:

- VÉTÉ or Vincent Timsit Workshop, building in Casablanca, Morocco

== People ==
- Albert Vete (born 1993), Tongan rugby league player
- Brian Sterling-Vete or Brian Vete (born 1958), English author, entrepreneur and performer
- Vete Sakaio (in office 2010-), Tuvaluan politician
