= Reg Tilsley =

- Born: Reginald Longueville Tilsley; 1926; Croydon, Surrey, England
- Died: 1987 (age 61) Worthing, West Sussex, England

Reginald Longueville Tilsley (16 August 1926 – 15 October 1987) was a British composer, arranger, and conductor born at Croydon. He was a prolific composer of library music, whose work has been featured in various films and television programmes.

== Life ==
Tilsley the son of composer Harry Tilsley, co-writer of "Lady of Spain". He was a chorister at Westminster Abbey before attending the London College of Music. He later studied conducting in Stuttgart under Polish composer Jerzy Gert. After serving in the Second World War, he joined the Leslie Douglas Orchestra as pianist-arranger before forming his own orchestral group.

In later years he moved to Westport, County Mayo, Ireland where he lived with his wife Maisie. He was also a regular conductor with the RTE Concert Orchestra.

== Career ==
Tilsley principally composed production music for the library of De Wolfe Music. Many of his titles were used as themes in television programmes from the 1970s onwards. De Wolfe also licensed albums of Tilsley's music for commercial use.

Tilsley released several easy listening albums for the domestic market, principally on Fontana Records. He was arranger and/or orchestral conductor on albums by Roberto Cardinali, Ruby Murray and Johnnie Gray. In the 1960s he also arranged music on albums by The Pretty Things and Dave Dee, Dozy, Beaky, Mick and Tich. He collaborated several times with Cliff Twemlow.

=== Film ===
Tilsley was the conductor and composer for the soundtracks of the 1968 film Love in Our Time and the 1969 films The Body Stealers, What's Good for the Goose, and Horror House. His compositions continue to be used in films, most notably "Chianti Country" in Letters to Juliet (2010) and "Super Diana" in Laggies (2014).

As uncredited stock music, his song "We Are The Champions" was featured in Dawn of the Dead (1978).

=== Television ===
"Hold the Road" was used as the theme music for The Eight O'Clock Movie on New York television station WPIX from 1975 to 1980.

A modified version of "Slow Moody Blues" was used as the title music of Harvey Birdman, Attorney at Law.

"Summer Convertible" was used as the title music of the English language learning programme Follow Me!

As uncredited stock music, "Return to Summer" was featured in The Benny Hill Show as well as two episodes of Breaking Bad.

Tilsley's music has been used in commercials such as the Magnavox 'Total Automatic Color' TV commercial using the song "Soft Spectrum" from Tilsley Orchestral No. 4. Other companies which have used his work in commercials include Mobil, Carnation Milk, and Lunn-Poly.

An edited version of "Diffusion" was used by Mississippi ETV (now Mississippi Public Broadcasting) for their production logo from 1979 to 1984.

=== Sampling ===
Tilsley's song "Warlock" has been sampled by artists such as KRS-One and Cam'ron, and in the song "We Made It" by Drake and Soulja Boy.
