= Brian Sterling-Vete =

English actor, stuntman and martial artist (born 1958)

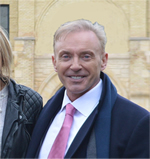
- Brian Sterling-Vete
- Born: 22 August 1958 (age 68)
- Other names: Brian Sterling; Brian Vete
- Occupations: Author; Motivational speaker, filmmaker broadcaster Stage actor Film actor Television actor Stunt performer Co-Producer
- Known for: Guinness World Record Holder; Award-Winning Film-Maker; Martial arts expert
- Website: hrw275.wixsite.com/briansterlingvete

Brian Sterling-Vete (aka Brian Sterling, Brian Vete) (born 22 August 1958) is an English author, Guinness World Record Holder, motivational speaker, TV broadcaster, Director, Stage, Film and Television actor, stunt performer, martial arts expert, fitness expert and entrepreneur.

== Early life ==
Brian Sterling-Vete was born in the Rusholme/Moss Side district of Manchester, England. He attended school at Heald Place County Primary and then Burnage High School (listed as notable alumni) before taking a 3-year degree course at Manchester Polytechnic, now Manchester Metropolitan University.

Prior to working in the TV and film industry, Sterling worked at multiple jobs including: selling books, as a demolition rigger, a nightclub bouncer, builder's apprentice, insurance sales, as a martial arts instructor, and as a gym instructor. Sterling bought a derelict gym in Rochdale, England and opened it as the Olympic Gym in 1980. This was successful until it was lost due to divorce in 1983.

Sterling began his career as a strength athlete in 1976 at the Apollo Gym on Deansgate in Manchester under senior bodybuilding coach, John Cupello. Sterling found some success in drug-free bodybuilding, competing in the National Amateur Body Building Association (NABBA) Junior Mr. North West, Junior Mr. Britain and Mr. Britain contests. Sterling set some acceptable lifts as a drug-free powerlifter and strength athlete at 200 lbs bodyweight in 1980: squat 665 lbs x 1 rep, dead lift 525 lbs x 1 rep, bench press 405 lbs x 1 rep, seated press behind neck 225 lbs x 1 rep.

== Career ==
=== Stuntman ===
Sterling began working as a TV & Film Stunt Performer when offered work on projects by the Mancunian author, songwriter, composer, and film producer Cliff Twemlow. In 1987 and 1988 Sterling set new world records in fire stunts for part body burns with gasoline. The first successful world record attempt in 1987 was set at 2 minutes, 24 seconds and the second successful world record attempt in 1988, was for 2 minutes, 53 seconds. Both records were set at the Armalite (now Armatomic) research laboratory under the direction of Craig Mills, the inventor of the pre-burnt carbon fibre multi-layer stunt suit system.

=== Martial Arts ===
Sterling began martial arts training in 1970 at the Chi Yun Kung Fu Woy club in the Houldsworth Hall on Deansgate in Manchester under Sifu George Taylor (later under Master Chan), as part of the British Kung Fu Council. Sterling began training Muay Thai under Master Sken and Toddy from 1975 to 1980 and during that time he was instructor at Master Toddy's club in Rochdale, England. Sterling also trained in Aikido, Dim Mak, Yawara and Karate.

Sterling currently holds 4 Black Belts, is a national, international, and World class referee and team coach. He was entered into the Bushido Martial Arts Roll of Honour; and given a Lifetime Achievement award by the World Karate and Kickboxing Council. His grades and awards are in the following chronology: Pak Mei Kung Fu Black Sash Hsiu Lung Tao Kung Fu 1998 Senior Instructor World Karate and Kickboxing Association: 2002 National Coach, Class A 2004 International Referee, Class A Bushido Martial Arts Association 2009 5th Degree Black Belt 2011 Honorary Fellow World Karate and Kickboxing Council 2010 World Referee Class A 2011 8th Degree Black Belt 2011 Lifetime Achievement Award Senior Coach to the English National Team for the World Championships 2013 International Referee Class A

=== Wrestling ===
Sterling travelled to Iceland in 1985 to wrestle the then 1-time winner of the World's Strongest Man contest, Jón Páll Sigmarsson. This was to promote a production of Claire Luckham's play, Trafford Tanzi produced by the Icelandic National Theatre. As a specialist strength and martial arts coach, Sterling helped to coach his new friend Jon Pall Sigmarsson in the martial arts and strength for another 3 World's Strongest Man wins.

=== Guinness World Record ===
In January 2005 Sterling produced and set a new Guinness World Record in Cadiz, Spain, to mark the launch of the Eli Lilly medication, Cymbalta. This was for mass participation plate spinning with 398 plates spun for 10 seconds. Prior to this Sterling had set 2 other World Records, the 1st in 1987 for speed breaking 105 regulation blocks and done as part of the BBC's Children in Need programme. That record stood for one year until it was beaten by his friend Mac Gilmour who was also the Scottish Karate Champion on the ITV programme You Bet! in 1988. This prompted him to then make another successful attempt at the same world record, again for the BBC's Children in Need programme in 1989 (breaking 127 regulation blocks in one minute), making a personal lifetime total of 5 World Records to date.

=== Film ===
Projects in collaboration with writer and producer Cliff Twemlow included: The Pike starring Joan Collins,"G.B.H", Target Eve Island, Masons War, The Ibiza Connection, The Blind Side of God, Ring of Steel, Tuxedo Warrior (aka "African Run" and "The Omega Connection"), Predator: the Quietus (aka Moonstalker), The Eye of Satan, Tokyo Sunrise, Firestar, and Lethal Impact. It was on the movie Predator the Quietus that Sterling met cinematographer David Tattersall. Sterling has been noted as saying in his 2010 (2013 re-published & expanded) book, Mental Martial Arts, that meeting David Tattersall was pivotal for him because that was the point when he took an interest in direction and cinematography to learn the arts himself while taking advice from, and being inspired by his new friend and Emmy Award winning cinematographer. Sterling began to learn the art himself, a skill he would later use on TV documentaries and as part of the BBC TV news team. Sterling joined the professional actors union, British Actors Equity, and made on-screen appearances in the UK and internationally. Credits include: BBC TV's That's Life!, "Naming the Names", Coronation Street, Wipe Out (as Carl Chambers).

Sterling doubled for Hollywood star Steve McQueen in a series of TV Commercials recreating the movie The Great Escape for Holsten Pils breweries, he again doubled as Ian Fleming's 007 character, James Bond for Barratt Developments and made appearances in Star Trek: The Next Generation by Paramount Pictures. In 2014, Sterling's character was Max Warwick in the horror movie, Geist. Sterling is a leading character in the movie, as a professor of paranormal studies investigating and exorcising demons from those possessed by them in a haunted mental asylum.

==== Documentary filmmaker ====
In 1988, Sterling formed the MajorVision organisation and began pioneering specialist documentary films. Sterling has produced 58 independent film productions, including the merited Porsche Cars 50th Anniversary documentary, The Power to Win, Fitness on the Move, The Ultimate Self Defence, The Mighty Steam Roller and the award-winning Giants of Steam.

As a broadcaster and presenter, Sterling produced programmes and news for Discovery TV, CNN, ITN and the BBC front line news for 15 years. Sterling was part of the BBC team winning 4 Royal Television Society awards, performing interviews with US President Bill Clinton and British Prime Minister Tony Blair at the G-8 Summit meeting in 1988. Sterling introduced the concept of Steadicam to the directors of Formula 1 motor racing TV coverage and he also performed the Pit Lane interviews in 1998/9 for FOCA TV.

Sterling was the director/camera operator (Rick Bayles – producer) for the team which received the Creative Excellence award for best documentary at the US Film and TV Festival in Chicago 2001 for the documentary "Millennium Bridge." Sterling and MajorVision covered two war zones, Desert Storm in 1991 and Bosnia in 1995; then in 2001 the Oldham race-religion riots in the UK for the BBC News.

In 2013/4, Sterling was the presenter, co-producer, director and the director of cinematography (D.O.P.) for the hour-long TV special about the origins of the United States as a nation; Robert Browne; The Rebel Who Inspired a Nation. Shot on location in England and in the United States, the documentary reveals never before seen data about how and why the Pilgrims first settled in America; and that the pilgrims were actually known for the 1st 200 years after settling Plymouth colony as the Brownist Emigration. It also how reveals how the core values of the United States as a nation owe much to the man behind them, Robert Browne (1550 to 1633).

As a producer/director of sports coaching and fitness instructional films, Sterling produced: Pro Boxing Heavy Bag Drills, Thai Bag Drills, Focus Pad Drills, Swiss-Ball Drills and Medicine Ball Drills all through the UK's National Coaching Foundation's publications division, Coachwise-1st 4Sport,. These followed on from Sterling's production of the Dictionary of Weight Training in 1991 for the same organisation.

In 2003, Sterling led the marine salvage diving team to lift the Baltic Trading ship, The Glaciere from its resting place at the bottom of the Collingwood Dock in Liverpool Bay. The ship's new home is in the Albert Dock moored outside the World-famous Tate Gallery. The ship's owner, Captain Dave Murray generously donated the ship for use as a sail and dive training vessel for charity, benefiting underprivileged children. Sterling arranged for three special feature length news reports to be produced and broadcast by the BBC about each stage of this operation, including the salvage day, the re-launch day and the maiden voyage day.

===== Documentary productions =====
- Freedom Denmark 1990
- Summer in Holland (1992) (V)
- The Power to Win 1992
- Fitness on the Move 1992
- The Ultimate Self Defence 1993
- Fitness over Forty 1993
- The Giants of Steam 1994
- Porsche 50th Anniversary Documentary 1998
- Manchester Storm Episode 1 1999
- Manchester Storm Episode 2 2001
- Millennium Bridge 2001
- Advantage TV 2007
- The Rough Guide to Athens 2007
- Robert Browne, The Rebel Who Inspired a Nation 2014

=== Business ===
In business, Sterling partnered with Perry Hughes (Roots Music Group), manager to opera star Jon Christos, contemporary jazz singer and songwriter Rick Guard and former manager to opera star Russell Watson). Sterling is the current CEO of MajorVision International, which produces specialist international TV and news services. Sterling's MajorVision organisation expanded into cellular telecom between 1995 and 2000, first contracting with CellStar (1995–1997) and then BrightPoint Europe, Middle East and Asia. Sterling is involved with international telecom with Bonjour and Emerald Networks.

=== Consultant ===
From 1985 to 1989 Sterling was consultant to British vitamin and food supplement manufacturers, Healthilife and to produce their Super-Bodypower range of food supplements. They were later the sponsorship owners of the NABBA Mr and Miss Universe contests for that period. In 2006 Sterling acquired Record Breakers company and turned it into a non-profit Registered International Fund Raising organisation for multiple Charities or C.I.C. The name was more commonly associated with the BBC TV show about World Records, hosted by Roy Castle OBE.

=== Author ===
2010, March 12, Sterling published his first book, Mental Martial Arts. Mental Martial Arts is a system of intellectual life-combat skills which uses the same strategies and principles of the physical martial arts, such as Kung Fu. The book is published through MajorVision Ltd.

2015, August 6, Sterling published the book Tuxedo Warriors which is his autobiography and also the biography of author, music composer, actor, and cult film producer, Cliff Twemlow, between 1977 and Twemlow's death in 1993. The book is published through MajorVision Ltd.

2015, September, Sterling was published as a contributing author in the book, Get in Shape Fast, by Josh Simmons, through Sociaverse publishing. The publisher listed Sterling, who wrote chapter 3 of the book, as being one of the top 10 fitness experts in the USA selected to contribute.

2016, 3 October, Sterling released the book: The 70-Second Difference. It is about exercise, fitness, and nutrition, and focuses heavily on the science of isometric exercise and functional isokinetic exercises. The book is published through MajorVision Ltd. and ISOfitness, and it is co-authored with bikini fitness bodybuilder competition winner, Helen Renee Wuorio.

2017, 15 April, Sterling published the book: The ISO90 Course, which is a 90-day/12-week strength training/bodybuilding course based on the isometric exercise system. The book is published through MajorVision Ltd. and ISOfitness, and it is co-authored with Helen Renee Wuorio.

2017, 18 April, Helen Renee Wuorio and Sterling co-authored the book: The Sixty-Second Ass Workout. Primarily aimed at women, the book is about how to exercise the muscles of the buttocks using the isometric exercise system. The book is published through MajorVision Ltd. and ISOfitness.

2017, 29 April, Sterling published the book: Fitness on the Move. It is about how to exercise without a gym or gym equipment, in particular while travelling as a passenger in a car, on a train, or on a plane. The exercises are based on the isometric system. The book is published through MajorVision Ltd. and ISOfitness, and it is co-authored with Helen Renee Wuorio.

2017, 10 July, Sterling published the book: The Bullworker Bible. It is about the exercises, the history, function, and the correct use of the Bullworker exercise device as both an isometric, and isotonic exerciser. The book is published through MajorVision Ltd. and ISOfitness, and it is co-authored with Helen Renee Wuorio.

2017, 26 October, Sterling published the book: The Bullworker 90 Course. It is a 90-day/12-week strength and bodybuilding course using the Bullworker, the Steel Bow, and the Iso-Bow exercise devices. The course incorporates both isometric and isotonic exercises. The book is published through MajorVision Ltd. and ISOfitness, and it is co-authored with Helen Renee Wuorio.

2017, 12 December, Sterling re-published the book: The Tuxedo Warrior. This the re-published biography of cult movie-maker Cliff Twemlow, which includes an extended prologue and epilogue section by Sterling. The book is published through MajorVision Ltd.

2017, 12 December, Sterling re-published the book: The Pike. This is a horror novel written by cult movie-maker Cliff Twemlow, which includes an extended prologue and epilogue section by Sterling. The book is published through MajorVision Ltd.

2017, 27 December, Sterling re-published the book: The Beast of Kane. This is a horror novel written by cult movie-maker Cliff Twemlow, which includes an extended prologue and epilogue section by Sterling. The book is published through MajorVision Ltd.

2017, 27 December, Sterling published the book: Workout at Work. It is about how to exercise while at work in a typical office environment over the course of an average working day, without a gym or gym equipment. The exercises are based on the isometric system. The book is published through MajorVision Ltd. and ISOfitness, and it is co-authored with Helen Renee Wuorio.

2018, 26 March, Sterling published the book: Being American Married to a Brit: An Amusing Guide for Anglo-American Couples Divided by a Common Language and Culture. The book is about life, culture, and language in the UK and USA, focussing on the humorous and interesting similarities, the differences. It is co-authored with Helen Renee Wuorio.

2018, 17 April, Sterling published the book: Paranormal Investigation: The Black Book of Scientific Ghost Hunting and How to Investigate Paranormal Phenomena. The book is about how to approach investigating paranormal phenomena from a scientific perspective and using scientific methodology. It thoroughly described the suggested best-practice approach to paranormal investigation using a step-by-step guide. It includes several example cases of paranormal activity and research that Sterling has been involved in. Sterling also extensively covers the UFO/UAP/USO phenomena and features all the data recording during the famous Redwood Falls MN UFO incident of 2017 in which he was involved. It also covers other UFO incidents and research Sterling has been involved with. It is co-authored with Helen Renee Wuorio.

2018, 3 May, Sterling published the book: The Bullworker Compendium: The Bullworker Bible and Bullworker 90 Course Combined. This book is a combination of both The Bullworker Bible and The Bullworker 90 Course. The exercises are based predominantly on the isometric system. The book is published through MajorVision Ltd., and it is co-authored with Helen Renee Wuorio.

2018, 11 May, Sterling published the book: The Doorway to Strength: Turn a Door into a Strength-Building Multigym. The book is about how to improvise the use of a door and door jamb to perform exercises using an Iso-Bow. The exercises are based on the isometric system. The book is published through MajorVision Ltd., and it is co-authored with Helen Renee Wuorio.

2018, 16 May, Sterling published the book: TRISOmetrics: Advanced Science-Based High-Intensity Strength and Muscle Building. The book is about a hybrid exercise system created by Sterling called TRISOmetrics, or the TRISOmetric exercise system. It combines three scientific approaches into one technique. The exercises are based on a specific combination of the isometric system and super-slow training. The book is published through MajorVision Ltd., and it is co-authored with Helen Renee Wuorio.

2018, 11 July, Sterling published the book: The ISOmetric Bible: Exercise Anywhere with Scientifically Proven Isometrics. The book is a comprehensive guide to isometric exercise, including the history, science, popular proprietary equipment, and common ways to effectively improvise equipment. The exercises are based on the isometric system. The book is published through MajorVision Ltd., and it is co-authored with Helen Renee Wuorio.

2018, 24 September, Sterling published the book: The Haunting of Lilford Hall: The Birthplace of the United States as a Nation Haunted by the Man Behind The Pilgrim Fathers Paperback. The book is about the true story of thirteen people all reporting having encountered extensive paranormal activity while living at Lilford Hall in Northamptonshire, England to produce a TV documentary called: Robert Brown: The Rebel Who Inspired a Nation which is available on Amazon Prime The book is published through MajorVision Ltd., and it is co-authored with Helen Renee Wuorio.

2019, 31 August, Sterling published the book: The TRISO90 Course: Advanced Strength and Muscle Building with The TRISOmetrics Exercise System. The book is about a 90-day progressive advanced exercise course based on the hybrid exercise system created by Sterling called TRISOmetrics, or the TRISOmetric exercise system. It combines three scientific approaches into one technique. The exercises are based on a specific combination of the isometric system and super-slow training. The book is published through MajorVision Ltd., and it is co-authored with Helen Renee Wuorio.

2019, 19 November, Sterling published the book: Isometric Exercises for Nordic Walking and Trekking: Part 1. Exercises for Individuals - Strength, Muscle and Stamina Building Exercises to Improve ... and to Perform During Walking Breaks Anywhere. The book is about how an individual can perform isometric exercises using a Nordic Walking Pole as an improvised isometric exercise device. The book is published through MajorVision Ltd., and it is co-authored with Helen Renee Wuorio.

2019, 20 November, Sterling published the book: Isometric Exercises for Nordic Walking and Trekking: Part 2. Exercises for Walk Partner-Pairs - Strength and Stamina Building Exercises to Improve the ... and to Perform During Walking Breaks Anywhere. The book is about how two people working together as a partner-pair can perform isometric exercises using a Nordic Walking Pole as an improvised isometric exercise device. The book is published through MajorVision Ltd., and it is co-authored with Helen Renee Wuorio.

2019, 2 December, Sterling published the book: Isometric Power Exercises for Martial Arts: Build Superior Strength, Muscle and Martial Arts ‘Firepower’ Using the Proven System Bruce Lee Used. The book is about specific isometric exercises for martial artists to improve their performance. It also shows how to use martial arts belts and sashes as improvised isometric exercise devices. The book is published through MajorVision Ltd., and it is co-authored with Helen Renee Wuorio.

2020, 12 January, Sterling published the book: Isometric Exercises for Golf: Part 1. Exercises for Individuals Strength, Muscle and Stamina Building Exercises to Improve Your Game and to Perform During Your Game. The book is about how an individual can perform isometric exercises using a golf club as an improvised isometric exercise device. The book is published through MajorVision Ltd., and it is co-authored with Helen Renee Wuorio.

2020, 16 January 16, Sterling published the book: Isometric Exercises for Golf: Part 2. Exercises for Partner-Pairs - Strength, Muscle and Stamina Building Exercises to Improve Your Game and to Perform During Your Game. The book is about how two people working together as a partner-pair can perform isometric exercises using a golf club as an improvised isometric exercise device. The book is published through MajorVision Ltd., and it is co-authored with Helen Renee Wuorio.

2020, 26 March, Sterling published the book: Feel Better In 70 Seconds: Help Beat Depression and Feel Better With 10 Easy to Perform Exercises For a Total-Body Workout With Scientifically Proven Isometrics. The book is about how performing a specific series of simple exercises each day can release feel-good hormones, improve mood, and help to beat depression. The book is published through MajorVision Ltd., and it is co-authored with Helen Renee Wuorio.

2020, 28 March, Sterling published the book: The Zero-Footprint Lockdown Workout: The 10 Exercise Total-Body Essential Workout Plan to Exercise Anywhere and Everywhere With Scientifically Proven Isometrics. The book is about how one can perform a total-body exercise routine at home in an almost zero-footprint environment. In particular, the isometric exercise system in the system will deliver maximum muscle stimulus with minimum impact on the body's immune and recovery system. The book is published through MajorVision Ltd., and it is co-authored with Helen Renee Wuorio

2020, 2 May, Sterling published the book: Improvised Isometric Exercise Devices - The Climber's Sling: How a Simple Climber's Sling Can Become a Powerful Improvised Isometric Exercise Device or IIED. The book is about how a climber's sling can be used alone or in combination with other slings as an effective improvised isometric exercise device. The book is published through MajorVision Ltd., and it is co-authored with Helen Renee Wuorio.

2020, 29 April, Sterling published the book: Improvised Isometric Exercise Devices - The Daisy Chain: How a Simple Climber's Daisy Chain Can Become a Powerful Improvised Isometric Exercise Device or IIED. The book is about how a climber's daisy chain can be used alone or in combination with others as an effective improvised isometric exercise device. The book is published through MajorVision Ltd., and it is co-authored with Helen Renee Wuorio

=== Strength and Fitness Expert ===
Sterling has written 6 books on strength training, bodybuilding and fitness (see author section) and is a major contributing author to a 3rd party book on fitness and body shaping. Get in Shape Fast by Josh Simmons, through Sociaverse publishing. In that book, Simmons and Sociaverse publishing, recognized that they considered Sterling to be among the top 10 fitness experts in the United States. Sterling is an expert in isometric, and isokinetic exercises, and is the inventor of the ISOfitness system of advanced isometric exercise combinations, as per the publications about these in the author section.

== Recognition ==
Sterling was honoured as one of the pioneers of British Video and Digital Cinematography in the 2005 book by Julian Granger of the British Film Institute. Sterling's work was again honoured at the Manchester and Salford Film Festival in 2009 and 2010 and in the book The Lost World of Cliff Twemlow: The King of Manchester Exploitation Movies by C.P. Lee and Andy Willis (as featured in the Manchester Evening News. Sterling was part of the pioneering movie making team led by Twemlow from the late 70s into the 90s. This 3-decade era was dubbed in the book as being 'The Golden Age of Video Cinematography' in Britain.

== Acting Roles ==
=== Filmography ===
==== As actor ====
- Target Eve Island (1983)
- The Ibiza Connection (1984) (V)
- G.B.H. (1983)
- Emmerdale Farm (2 episodes, 1986) (TV)
- The Blind Side of God (1987)
- Star Trek: The Next Generation (2 episodes, 1987) (TV)
  - The Battle (1987) episode
  - Justice (1987) episode
- Wipe Out (1988) (TV mini-series)
- Lethal Impact (1991) (V)
- The Eye of Satan (1992) (V)
- Coronation Street (3 episodes, 1988)
- "Manchester Storm Episode 1" on YouTube (1999)
- "Manchester Storm Episode 2" on YouTube (2002)
- "Geist. The Movie" (2014)

==== TV Presenter ====
- "Charles Dickens’ 200th Anniversary Pilot" on YouTube (2011)
- "Agents of Change pilot show" on YouTube (2012)
- "Orlando Fashion Week Techno Charity Show" on YouTube (2012)
- "Rebel Who Inspired a Nation" on Amazon Prime Video UK (2013/14)

==== As stuntman ====
- Eve Island (1983)
- G.B.H. (1983)
- Ibiza Connection (1984) (V)
- /Screen Two Naming the Names (1 episode, 1987) (TV)
- The Eye of Satan (1992) (V)

=== Theater ===
- Yankee Doodle Dandy – George M. Cohan (M/C Polytechnic Theatre)
- The Silver Box – Jeremiah (M/C Polytechnic Theatre)
- Trafford Tanzi – Stunt Choreographer & Fight Director (Icelandic National Theatre)
- Aladdin 1995 and 1996 – Chinese Police Chief Ping (Albert Halls)
- Dick Whittington 1997, 1998 and 1999 – King Rat (Albert Halls)
- Spring and Port Wine 1998 – Arthur Gasket (Healds Green-Room Production and Theatre)
- Blithe Spirit 1999 – Mr Condemine (Healds Green-Room Production and Theatre)
- Hobson's Choice 1999 – William Mossop (Healds Green-Room Production and Theatre)
