= Alan Haines =

British actor and playwright (1924–2011)

Alan Haines (6 June 1924 – 17 April 2011) was a British actor and playwright who spent four years in the Royal Navy during World War II — including at D-Day on his 20th birthday and appeared in many West End shows and touring productions, as well as in the cult TV series Dad's Army and Van der Valk and two notable films: Dad's Army and The Man in the White Suit, and the acclaimed BBC TV Series Perfect Strangers.

He died in Charing Cross Hospital on 17 April 2011.

== Works ==
- The Prince of Portobello Play (1962)
- Autobiography Haines (2006) The Mad Mad-Century Rag London: MER Publishing (2007), ISBN 978-0-9555849-0-9

== Selected filmography ==
- The Man in the White Suit (1951) - Reporter (uncredited)
- The Eyes of Annie Jones (1964) - Const. Marlowe
- Dad's Army (1971) - Marine Officer
