= Andy Quin =

British composer, theatre organist and jazz pianist

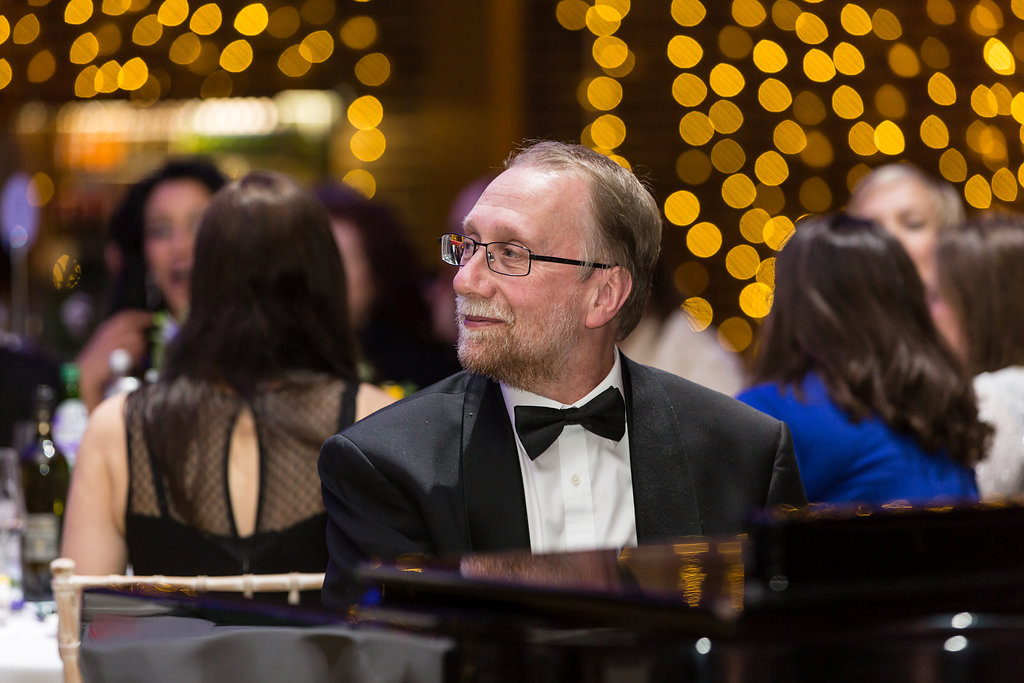
- Quin in 2018

Background information
- Born: 12 August 1960 (age 65); London, England
- Genres: Jazz, pop
- Occupation: Musician
- Instruments: Piano, keyboards, organ, percussion, drums
- Years active: 1984–present
- Label: De Wolfe Music
- Website: andyquinmusic.com

Andrew James Quin (born 12 August 1960) is a British composer, theatre organist and jazz pianist who works in TV and film. His music has appeared in Hollywood movies, advertising campaigns, and television programs. His work has appeared in British TV shows such as Coronation Street and Holby City.

== Early life ==
Quin was not from a musical family. He was offered a scholarship to study classical piano at the Royal College of Music, but he turned down the place in order to pursue his growing interests in improvisation, composition and music technology.

== Career ==
He has well over one thousand published tracks.
