= Magere Brug =

Bridge in Amsterdam

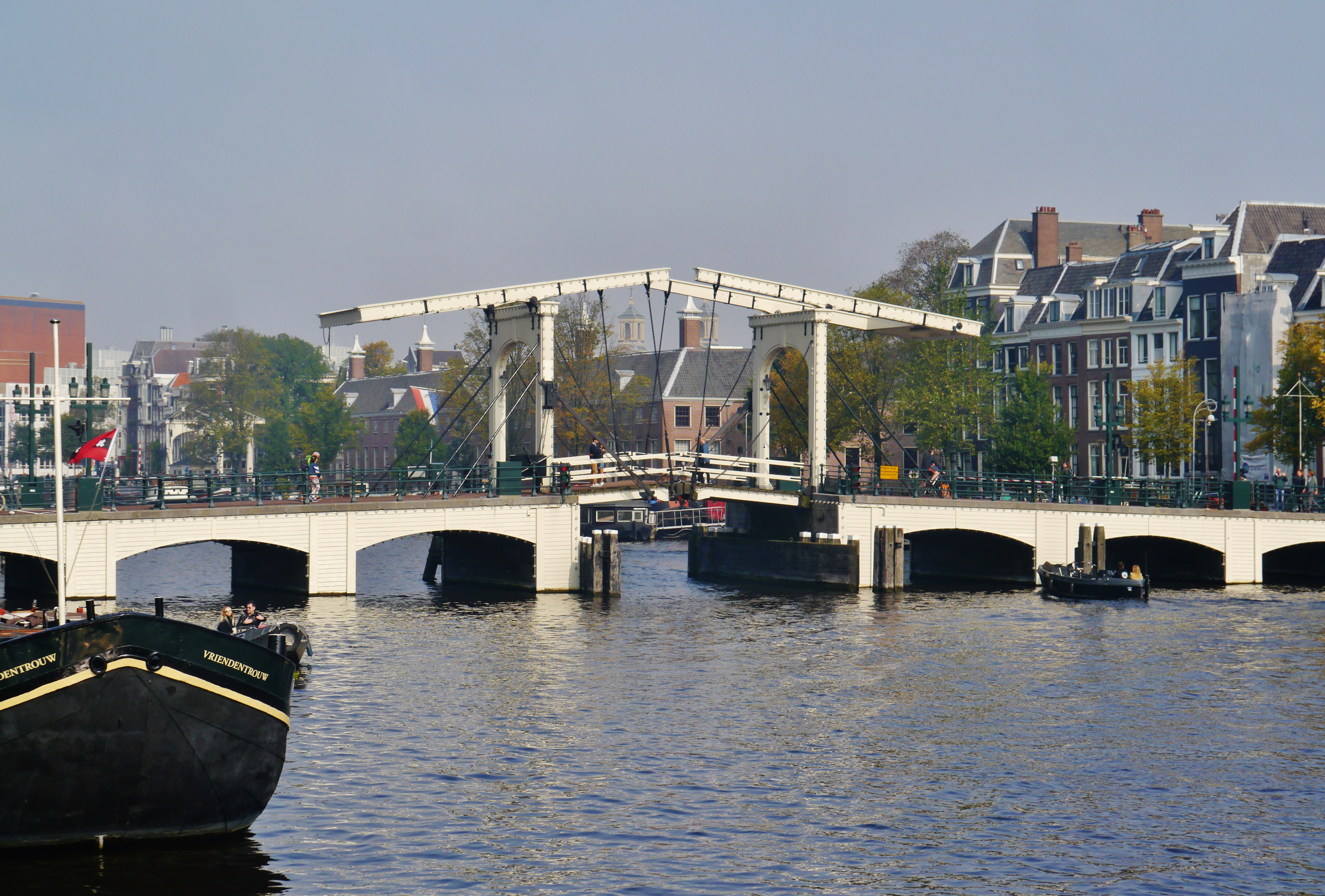
- The Magere Brug in 2017
- Coordinates: 52°21′49″N 4°54′09″E
- Carries: N+A
- Crosses: Amstel
- Locale: Amsterdam, Netherlands

The Magere Brug (English: Skinny Bridge) is a bridge over the river Amstel in Amsterdam, Netherlands. It connects the banks of the river at Kerkstraat, between the Keizersgracht and Prinsengracht.

The central section of the Magere Brug is a bascule bridge made of white-painted wood. The present bridge was built in 1934. The first bridge at this site was built in 1691 as Kerkstraatbrug and had 13 arches. Because this bridge was very narrow, the locals called it magere brug, which literally means "skinny bridge". In 1871 the state of the bridge had deteriorated so much, it was demolished and replaced by a nine-arched wooden bridge. Half a century later, this bridge also needed to be replaced. Architect Piet Kramer made several designs for a steel and stone bridge, but the city decided to replace it with a new bridge that looked the same as the previous, only slightly bigger. In 1934, that bridge was demolished, and replaced by a redesign made by Piet Kramer. The last major renovation was in 1969. Until 1994, the bridge was opened by hand, but is now operated automatically.

Use of the bridge has been limited to pedestrians and cyclists since 2003. The centre-part is opened many times, daily, in order to let river traffic pass. The sightseeing tour boats are low enough to pass underneath the bridge when closed. The bridge is decorated with 1,200 light bulbs which are turned on in the evening.

A story told to tourists about the origins of the 1691 version of the bridge is that it was built by two sisters who lived on opposite sides of the Amstel river and wanted to be able to visit one another, every day. In one variant of the story, the sisters were not able to afford a bridge of adequate width or height for general use, so a very narrow bridge was built, hence its name. In another variant, the sisters' last name was Mager (skinny), which gave name to the bridge (rather than its narrowness). Recent research of city archives revealed the name has its origin in the fact that originally a broad and monumental stone bridge was planned during Amsterdam's prosperous Golden Age, but the 1672 economic setback forced the city council to drastically scale back the plans, and build a basic and simple structure instead.

Locals regard the bridge as the most romantic of all in Amsterdam. It is a common site for proposals and lovers' strolls. Additionally, legend says that a kiss between lovers while on this bridge (or passing beneath by boat) ensures that they will be in love forever.

The bridge can be seen in a number of films, including the 1971 James Bond film Diamonds Are Forever, in which the legend of the bridge's being built is told by a boat tour guide.

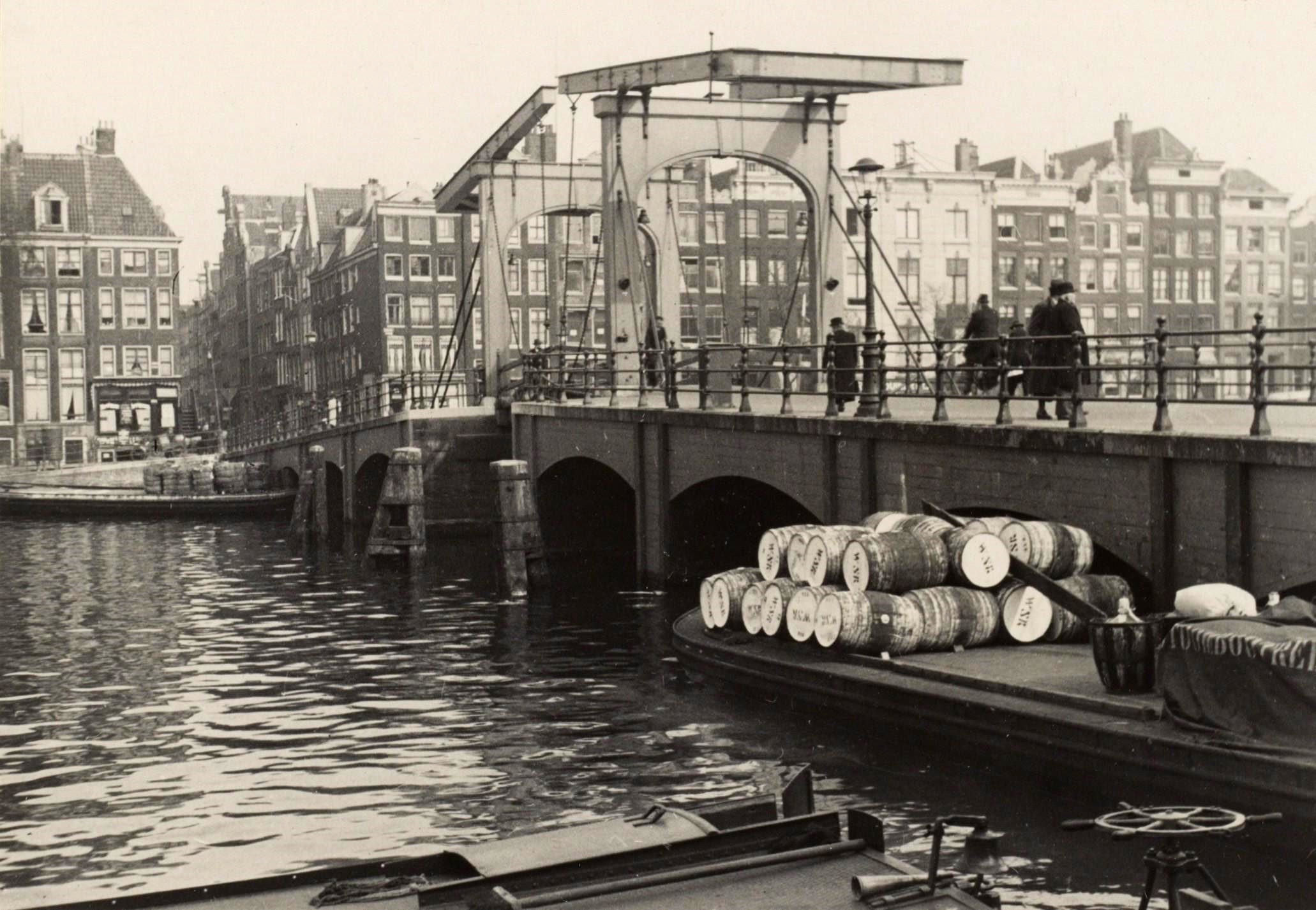
The Magere Brug in circa 1938

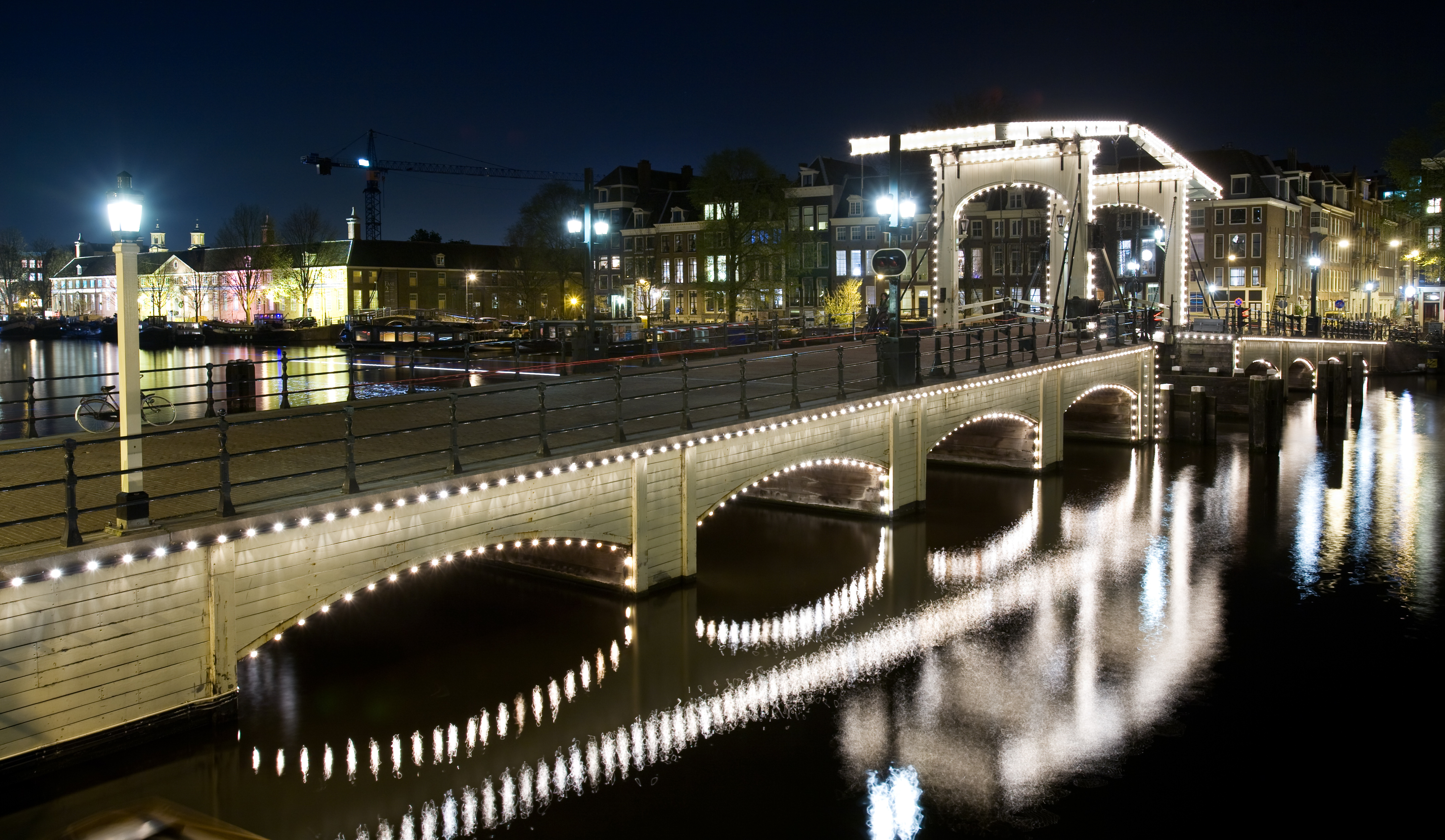
The Magere Brug at night in 2008
