= Eye Level =

1972 single by the Simon Park Orchestra

Single by Simon Park Orchestra

from the album Eye Level
- B-side: "Distant Hills"
- Released: 3 November 1972
- Genre: Orchestral
- Length: 2:20
- Label: Columbia
- Songwriter: Jack Trombey
- Producer: Simon Park

"Eye Level" is a 1972 single by the Simon Park Orchestra. It was produced originally for the De Wolfe Music Library and selected by Thames Television to be the theme tune for their Netherlands-based detective series Van der Valk.

== Overview ==
The work was originally intended as library music, and was loosely based on a German/Dutch nursery rhyme called Jan Hinnerk (in German) or Catootje (in Dutch), which in its turn took the opening bars of Non più andrai from Mozart's Le Nozze di Figaro. Dutch composer Jan Stoeckart adapted the original tune and wrote a new top line under the name of Jack Trombey, while Simon Park arranged it for his own orchestra and conducted the recording. The track was fully entitled "Eye Level (Theme from the TV series 'Van Der Valk')". A song based on the music with lyrics added was called "And You Smiled", performed by Matt Monro.

The tune became popular with audiences and Columbia Gramophone Company issued it as a single (catalogue number DB 8946) with the theme to Granada Television's drama series Crown Court, entitled "Distant Hills", on the B-side. The record entered the UK chart for just two weeks in late 1972. Almost a year later, the record was re-issued and in September 1973 it became a hit, with four weeks at No.1 and a further 20 weeks in the top 50. Total sales were 1,005,500, gaining the award of a platinum disc and becoming one of the 12 best-selling singles of the 1970s. In Ireland, the song was also a hit, reaching No. 3 in the charts there. In 1974, Stoeckart released his own version under the name Jack Trombey's Brass.

In the US, it was used as theme music in 1970s TV and radio commercials for KLM Royal Dutch Airlines. It was also used for TV advertisements for Alton Towers, in its pre-Luna Park mode of gardens, fronted by Frank Muir and in the 1980s for Oranjeboom lager using "tulips" for "your lips" as "wrap tulips around a pint today". "Eye Level" was issued as a single in the United States on Vanguard Records (catalogue #35175). Though it failed to chart on the Hot 100, it did make No. 29 on the Billboard Easy Listening chart in January 1974.

== Track listing ==
1. "Eye Level (Theme from the TV series Van Der Valk)" (Trombey) 2:20
2. "Distant Hills (Theme from the TV series Crown Court)" (Reno / Haseley) 3:02

== Chart performance ==
=== Weekly charts ===
Chart (1973–74)	Peak position
Australia (Kent Music Report)	13
Ireland (IRMA)	3
UK Singles Chart	1
US Billboard Adult Contemporary	29

=== Year-end charts ===
Chart (1974)	Rank
Australia (Kent Music Report)	61

== Sales and certifications ==
Region	Certification	Certified units/sales
United Kingdom (BPI)	Platinum	1,010,000
