= Trafford Tanzi =

Play by Clare Luckham

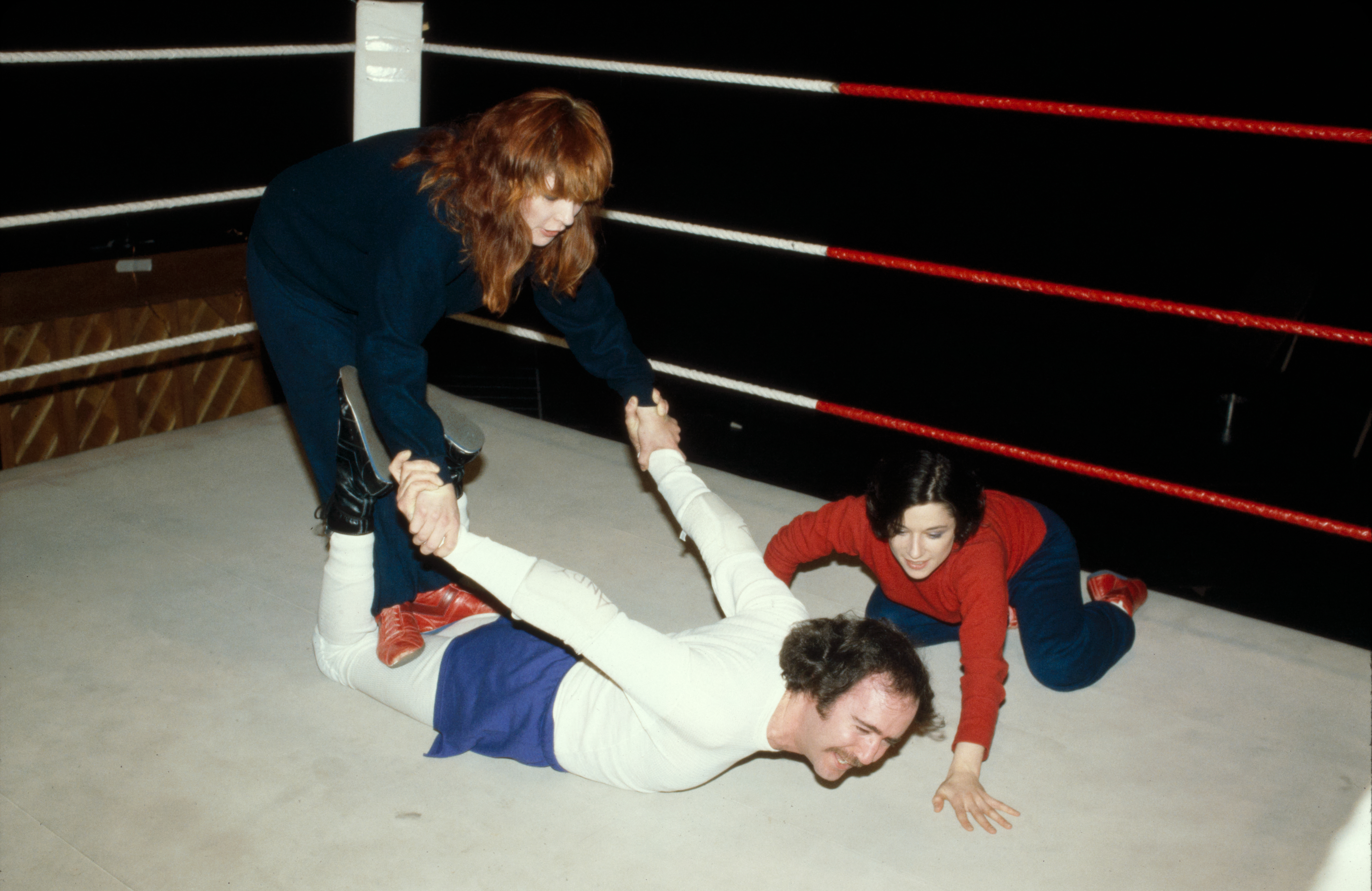
- Andy Kaufman wrestling with Debbie Harry and Caitlin Clarke in 1983
- Written by: Clare Luckham
- Setting: wrestling ring

Premiere
- Date: 1980
- Place: England

Trafford Tanzi is a play by Clare Luckham. It was originally performed as Tuebrook Tanzi, The Venus Flytrap by the Everyman Theatre Company in Liverpool in 1978 before moving to Manchester as Trafford Tanzi in 1980, later achieving commercial success in London.

== Plot ==
The play is set in a wrestling ring where the story of the title character, Tanzi, is told. Tanzi's parents bring her up to be feminine, but she refuses to conform to traditional femininity and is labelled a tomboy. She marries a professional wrestler named Dean Rebel and supports him in his career. Eventually, she becomes a champion professional wrestler herself and finally challenges her husband Dean to a match, with the loser being required to do the housework.

In keeping with the wrestling theme, the play is divided into ten rounds, each of which ends with a bell. All of the cast members participate in wrestling during the play, and the audience is welcome to cheer and boo the characters as though they were at an actual wrestling match.

== History ==
The word "Trafford" in the play's title refers to the metropolitan borough of Trafford in Greater Manchester, England. The play has also been produced under a variety of other titles, including Tuebrook Tanzi, Tarzana Tanzi, Tujunga Tanzi, Turbo Tanzi, Texas Tanzi, Tickfaw Tanzi, and Tarantula Tanzi. It was performed in French in Ottawa simply as Tanzi

The play was originally performed in Trafford in 1980 by the feminist Monstrous Regiment Theatre Group. The play has sometimes been described as having a "bourgeois feminist" perspective. Singer and actress Toyah Willcox starred in a production at the Mermaid Theatre in London, from March to August 1983.

=== Teaneck Tanzi ===
In 1983, the play was produced on Broadway under the title Teaneck Tanzi: The Venus Flytrap. Alternating in the lead role of Tanzi were Deborah Harry (lead singer of the band Blondie) and Caitlin Clarke; the role was double-cast because of the strenuous nature of the wrestling involved. Also appearing in the Broadway production was comedian Andy Kaufman as the referee; Kaufman was attracted to the role because of the wrestling theme. (Kaufman had himself been known for wrestling against women and had claimed to be the world inter-gender wrestling champion, known for his staged match with professional wrestler Jerry Lawler.) Despite the play's previous success in London, though, Teaneck Tanzi closed on Broadway the same day it opened. (There were, however, two performances—a matinee and an evening show.)
