= Mike Smithson (British journalist) =

British politician (born 1946)

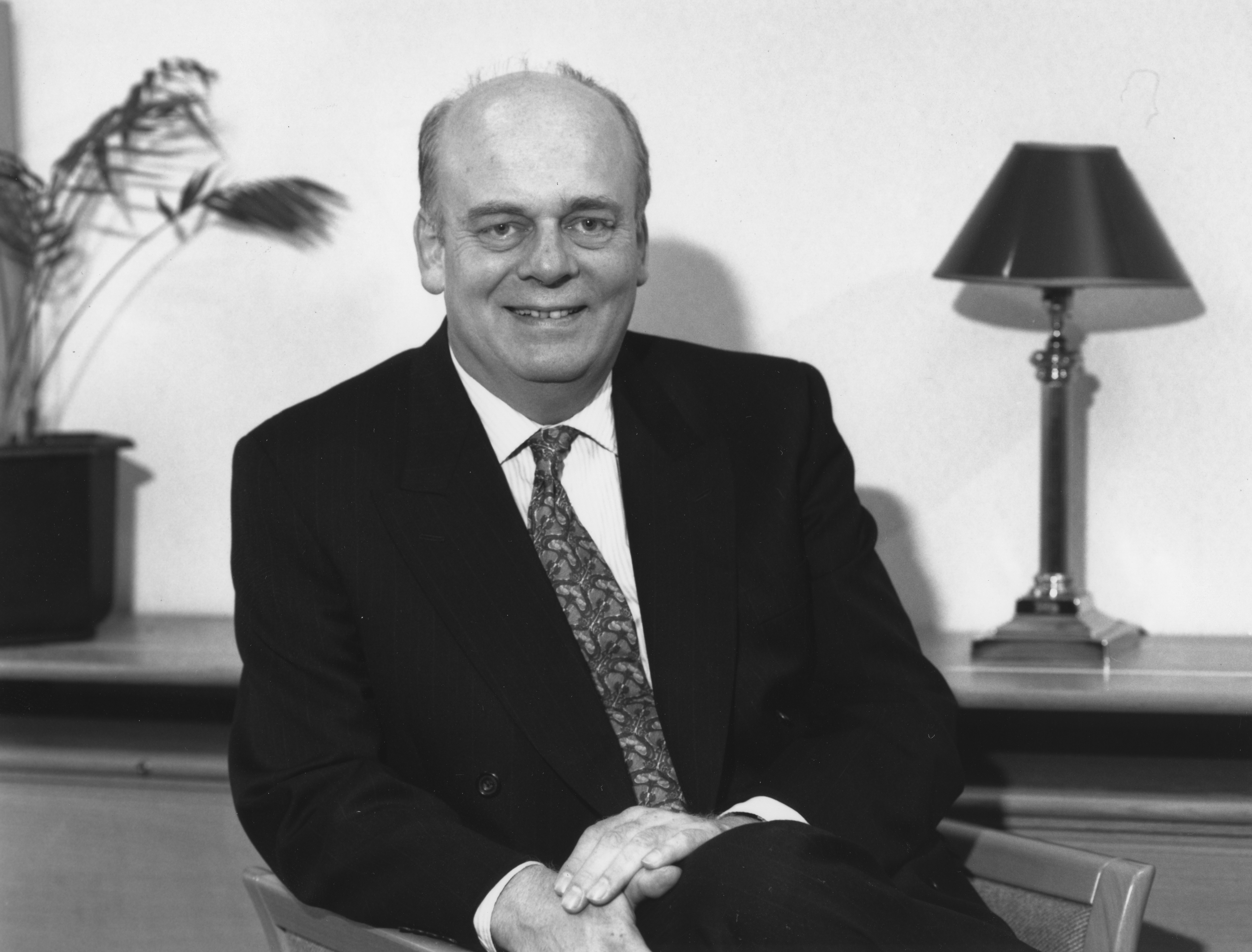
Mike Smithson, c. 1980s

Michael Smithson (born 11 May 1946) is a writer, a former Liberal Democrat politician and expert on betting on politics who in 2004 founded the website politicalbetting.com. Since January 2008, he has been the full-time editor of the site. As a result, The Daily Telegraph described him as the 33rd most influential over-50 on Twitter in 2014. He has been described as "perhaps the most influential person in the British political betting community".

== Early career ==
Much of his early career was a BBC News journalist. From 1977 to 1982 he represented the UK's radio and television journalists on the National Executive Committee of the National Union of Journalists (NUJ).

Since 1994, he has worked as Director of Development running the fundraising for five UK universities - for the London School of Economics from 1994 to 1996, for Cambridge University from 1996 to 1999, for Oxford University from 1999 to 2005, and for the University of York from 2005 to April 2007. He also had a spell at Open University.

During his university fundraising career he has oversaw approaches that have led to more than £550m being raised. This included the $100m gift by James Martin to establish the James Martin 21st Century School at the University of Oxford - the largest ever single alumni donation to a UK university.

He is a former fellow of Queens' College, Cambridge and Magdalen College, Oxford.

== Political career ==
He joined the Liberal Democrats on their foundation, and stood for Parliament in North Bedfordshire at the 1992 general election. He was twice elected in 1989 and 1993 as a County Councillor in Bedfordshire, and also in 1996 as a Borough Councillor in Bedford. He has not been politically active since then.

== Book ==
In 2007, his book, The Political Punter - How to make money betting on politics, was published by Harriman House. Prospect described it as an "excellent how-to guide".

== Other ventures ==
He has also acted as a consultant for Betfair and written a column for them.

== Family ==
Mike Smithson is married to Jacqueline Smithson and has two daughters and a son, Robert Smithson, who uncovered the Lernout & Hauspie fraud.

His brother is the film and television producer John Smithson. His grandfather was Charles Smithson, mayor of Nelson, Lancashire.
