= Silodam =

Silodam is a housing development and mix use (office / commercial / meeting place / public space) complex located in Oude Houthaven in the Netherlands. The complex is designed by MVRDV.

Built on a former breakwater and incorporating grain silos known as the Stone Silo (c. 1896-1898 and restored by André van Stigt) was constructed from 1995 to 2003. Within the container complex are 95 units for housing and the rest for mix use.

== See also ==
- Habitat 67
