= De Wolfe Music =

British music production company

De Wolfe Limited
- Founded: 1909
- Founder: Meyer de Wolfe
- Genre: Various
- Country of origin: United Kingdom
- Location: London; New York

De Wolfe Limited (previously known as Music de Wolfe, often referred to as De Wolfe Music) is a British music production company, recognised as the originator of what has become known as library music. De Wolfe Music was established by Meyer de Wolfe in 1909 and began its recorded library in 1927 with the advent of 'talkies'.

Music from the library has been used in a number of well-known productions, including Monty Python, Emmanuelle, Dawn of the Dead, American Gangster, The Simpsons Movie, Death Wish, Aqua Teen Hunger Force, Little Big Planet, Brokeback Mountain, EastEnders, Kavanagh QC, The Royle Family, Spitting Image, Hundreds of Beavers, Top Gear and Doctor Who. Well known theme tunes include Vision On, Van der Valk, Roobarb and The NFL Today. In recent years has been sampled by the likes of Mark Ronson and Lily Allen, Peshay, Swing Out Sister, Ja Rule, Gorillaz, Unkle and Beyoncé.

De Wolfe built and owns Angel Recording Studios, a recording and mixing complex situated at The Angel, Islington, London. Artists who have recorded there in recent years include Adele, Snow Patrol, Cee Lo Green, Labrinth, George Fenton (BAFTA and EMMY winner for his scores to the BBC's The Blue Planet and Planet Earth), Ian Brown, Elbow, Doves, The Feeling, and Kaiser Chiefs. Its specially composed department is called Inter Angel. De Wolfe is still a family-run company.

== History ==
De Wolfe Ltd was founded in London by Dutch musician Meyer de Wolfe in 1909. In early cinema the soundtrack to movies was provided by musicians playing live in the theatres. Meyer de Wolfe offered a sheet music library of original compositions to accompany silent films, often produced in collaboration with other musicians from the orchestras of London. These collaborators included conductor Sir Landon Ronald, violinist and conductor Sir Eugene Goossens, composers Giuseppe Becce and Ivor Novello, and violinist Mantovani.

By the late 1920s de Wolfe Music began recording with the 'sound-on-disc' technique and 'sound-on-film', on the 35mm nitrate film. This film was explosive if improperly stored, which proved to be the cause of an explosion in the basement of the company's Wardour Street office. Examples of compositions from this time include Keep Your Face To The Sunshine (1926), Odiele, performed by Ivor Novello, from the film The Rat (1925), and Policeman's Holiday (1931) by Montague Ewing.

In the 1930s de Wolfe created soundtracks for newsreels, working with Pathé News, British Movietone News, and British Gaumont Cinemas. This work continued throughout the Second World War and on in to the 1960s. The company was still providing music for film, including Fame Is the Spur (with a soundtrack composed by Dam Busters pilot John Wooldridge) and Edward, My Son (1948).

After the Second World War, de Wolfe expanded in to North America through a partnership with Corelli and Jacobs, two film editors from Paramount Pictures. In 1955 the company provided the music for the first televised commercial in the U.K. for Gibbs Toothpaste.

In 1962 de Wolfe began distributing 10" vinyl records, with cover designs by Rolf Webster and Nick Bantock. These LPs are now widely sought after by record collectors. At this time de Wolfe provided the theme to The Power Game (earning de Wolfe and Wayne Hill an Ivor Novello Award for Instrumental Composition of the Year), and for a number of episodes of Doctor Who.

The Pretty Things (Phil May, Dick Taylor, John Povey, John Alder and Wally Allen) recorded five albums for the Music de Wolfe library under the name 'Electric Banana' from 1967-1978 that were used in the film 'Dawn Of The Dead', the Doctor Who story 'The Green Death' and the TV series 'The Sweeney'. These albums were released in the UK as a 3-CD Box Set by Grapefruit Records on Sep 27 2019.

In 1973 a Jack Trombey composition was used as the theme for the detective series Van Der Valk. Eye Level became a million-selling number one single, topping the U.K charts for six weeks. Around this time de Wolfe music could be heard in Kung Fu movies by Shaw Brothers, British comedies Zeta One and Adventures of a Taxi Driver, and the Monty Python films. The 1970s was a period of further expansion for the company, with the addition of the Rouge catalogue in 1975 and the establishing of Angel Recording Studios in 1979.

Digital technology brought changes to the music industry in the 1980s, particularly with the evolution of CDs. In 1985 de Wolfe launched its DWCD collection of 6 CDs, becoming the world's first digital production music library. De Wolfe ultimately ended the production of its vinyl series in 1988, and the end of the production of CDs would come in 2014 as de Wolfe shifted focus to online delivery.

De Wolfe Ltd celebrated its centenary year in 2009, with the company at that time claiming offices and agents in 40 countries.

== Labels ==
De Wolfe Ltd produces audio for a variety of genres and usage, which are organised in to a number of labels.

=== De Wolfe Music (DWCD) ===
De Wolfe's primary label, and where a majority of the new releases are housed. Releases on this label keep up to date with current popular music, but it also features albums from more experimental genres.

=== De Wolfe Vinyl (DWLP) ===
Home to the vast archive of de Wolfe tracks, primarily recorded between the 1930s and 1980s. The company is in the process of digitising, restoring and remastering this catalogue. The label has a large cult following.

=== 20th Century Archive (DWMIL) ===
A limited CD series containing a number of well-known recordings from de Wolfe's past. A large number of tracks, particularly those used in Pathé films and in iconic movies, were remastered for these albums.

=== De Wolfe Jazz (DWJAZZ) ===
De Wolfe's collection of jazz recordings, including a number of albums written in styles associated with the 1920s - 1940s.

=== De Wolfe Classical (DWC) ===
Classical recordings, a number of which were recorded at Angel Recording Studios. Most of this catalogue is yet to be made available online.

=== Commercial Breaks (DWCOM) ===
Short and punchy songs, designed for commercials.

=== Sold State Music (DWUSA) ===
Developed to produce Americana and American rock music, now home to a more general rock and sports rock catalogue.

=== De Wolfe RPO (DWRPO) ===
Classical Library, with tracks performed by the Royal Philharmonic Orchestra.

=== Rouge Music (RMCD) ===
Created in the 1970s Rouge features pop, sports rock, modern rock and corporate music. It includes the Club Rouge and Jazz collections, as well as the Rouge Vinyl (RMSLP) records.

=== Hudson (HMCD) ===
Bought by de Wolfe, Hudson is known for quirky and clichéd tunes, but also features the HMCLP collection of vinyl records.

=== Sylvester (SMCLP) ===
Part of the de Wolfe roster since the early days, Sylvester Music (SMCLP) has its origins in France. It features a number of progressive Jazz recordings from the likes of Vladimir Cosma, Martial Solal and Pierre Arvay.

=== Widescreen (WIDE) ===
Launched in 2016 Widescreen features trailer music and cinematic compositions, including 5.1 options.

=== Bite Hard (BITE) ===
The newest label, Bite Hard features albums made through collaborations with American record producers. Primarily these albums feature samples from de Wolfe archive tracks, and have been made commercially available.

=== Sound Effects ===
As well as music, de Wolfe supplies sound effects. Its collection includes sounds from the BBC, Hanna-Barbera, Sound Ideas and the DWSFX collection.

=== De Wolfe Commercial (DWCR) ===
Commercially available albums made up of film soundtracks, including Witchfinder General and Monty Python and the Holy Grail, compilations of well-known tunes, and albums from the likes of Deux Filles.

== Angel Recording Studios ==
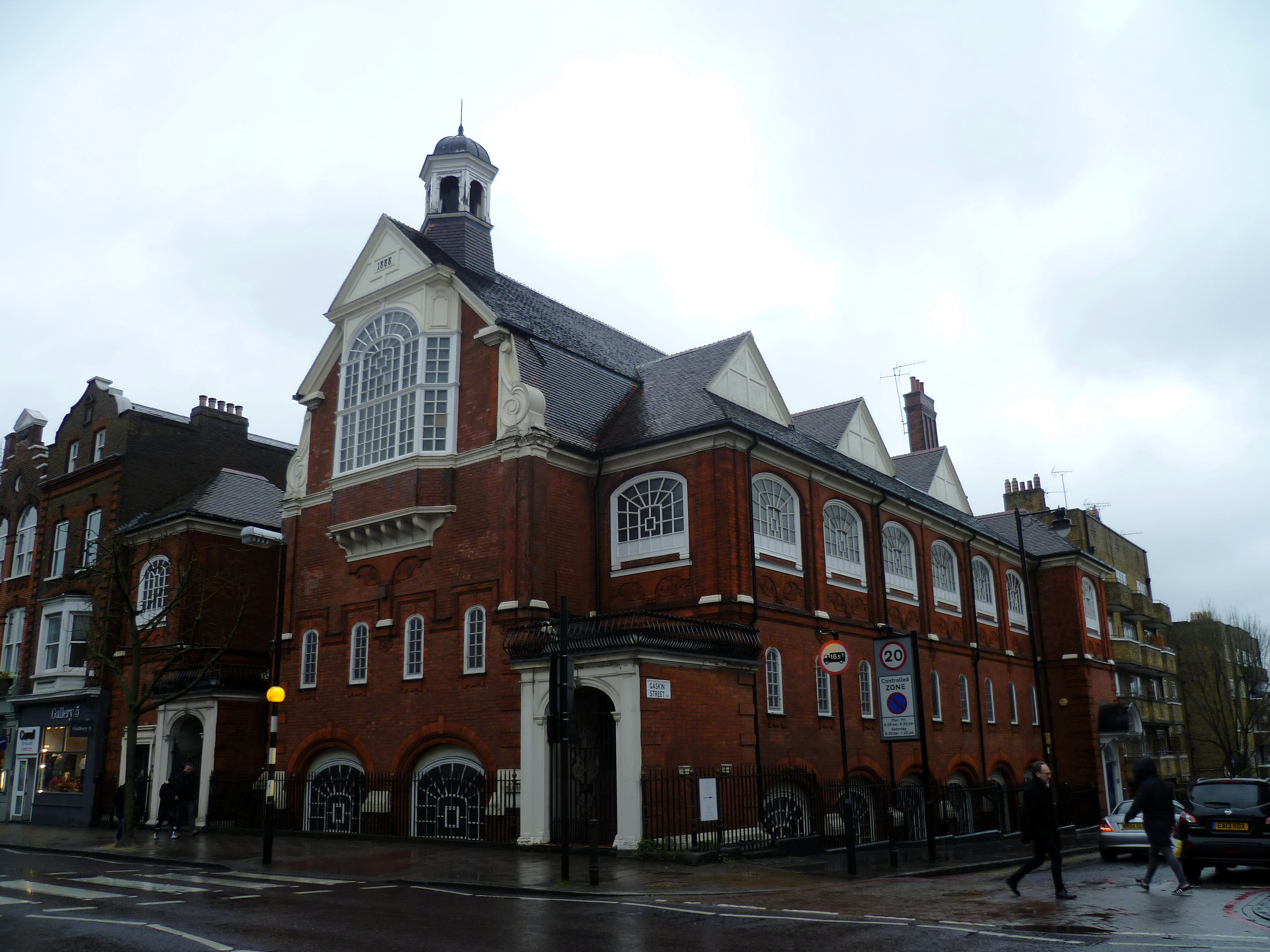
Angel Recording Studios

(see Angel Recording Studios)

Built in 1979, Angel Recording Studios is a recording and mixing facility in Angel, Islington, North London. The studio has been used by the likes of The Clash, Shirley Bassey, One Direction, Take That, Kylie Minogue, Adele, Sam Smith and George Fenton for his work on the soundtrack for the BBC series Planet Earth and The Blue Planet.

Angel Studios closed in 2019, before reopening as part of the Abbey Road Institute

== Inter Angel ==
Specially composed tracks, commissioned to a roster of composers and produced at Angel Recording Studios. Inter Angel has provided theme tunes for shows including Saturday Kitchen, Robot Wars, Hairy Bikers, Thronecast, Delia Smith and A League of Their Own.

== De Wolfe USA ==
For a number of years, de Wolfe had a presence in the United States through its partnership with Corelli & Jacobs. In 2013 steps were taken to officially launch De Wolfe USA to increase the company's presence on the other side of the Atlantic. The office was set up in New York and since then the company has worked on a number of projects with HBO, ABC, Fox, Netflix, Amazon and many other US-based production companies. De Wolfe USA was also key to establishing of the Bite Hard label.

== Composers ==
De Wolfe composers past and present include: Jack Trombey, Simon Park, Tim Souster, Barbara Moore, Pierre Arvay, Andy Quin, Anthony Mawer, Alex Heffes, Stanley Myers, Stephane Grappelli, Henry Farrar, John Altman, John Reids, Janos Lehar, Stanley Black, David Bradnum, John Saunders, Frank Mcdonald and Chris Rae, Paul Lawler, Harold East, Frederic Talgorn, York Bowen, Johnny Hawksworth, Keith Papworth, Earl Ward, Paul Ferris, Steve Sidwell, Ivor Slaney, Reg Tilsley, Ronald Binge, Y Ngani, David Kelly, Cy Jack, Duncan Aran, Hampton Hawes, Basil Kirchin, Alan Parker, Ena Baga, Roger Webb, Ivor Novello, Oliver Armstrong, Colin Kiddy, Howie, David Hubbard, Kenneth Gamble, Ronald Waterworth, Nigel Mullaney, Danny Davies, Jonathan Jowett, Simon Stewart, Troy Banarzi, Ross Hardy, John Leach, Paul Leonard-Morgan, Terry Keating, Ian Boddy, Sam Fonteyn, Paul Lewis, Karl Jenkins, Terry Gadsden, Edmund Jolliffe, Hermann Langschwert and Nick Ingman.

== Usage ==
De Wolfe credits and usage include several films and television series, as well as a number of commercials, radio shows, and video games.

Notable TV shows include Vision On, Monty Python, Roobarb, Noah and Nelly in... SkylArk, The Power Game, The Sweeney, Aqua Teen Hunger Force, Henry's Cat, George and Mildred, Man About The House, NFL Today, Mindhunter, Master of None, The Unbreakable Kimmy Schmidt, Madame Gusto's Circus, Springwatch, Spitting Image, Jamaica Inn, Balamory, Agatha Christie's Poirot, Minder, Feud, Atlanta, Peaky Blinders, Mr Robot, The Night Manager, Better Call Saul, World Championship Wrestling, That Mitchell and Webb Look, SCTV (Season 4) and World War II in Colour.

De Wolfe music also appears in the films Emmanuelle, Octopussy, The Living Daylights, The Cider House Rules, Fear and Loathing in Las Vegas, Brokeback Mountain, Witchfinder General, The Fourth Protocol, The Prestige, Grindhouse, Sicko, Dawn of the Dead, Shaun of The Dead, Tomb Raider, Hidden Figures, Brooklyn, and Hundreds of Beavers.

During the September 11 attacks, the track "Landscapes" was used by HGTV and Food Network when they suspended broadcasting to show their respects.

== See also ==
- Production music
