= Molen De Dikkert =

Coordinates: 52°18′29.35″N 4°50′49.96″E

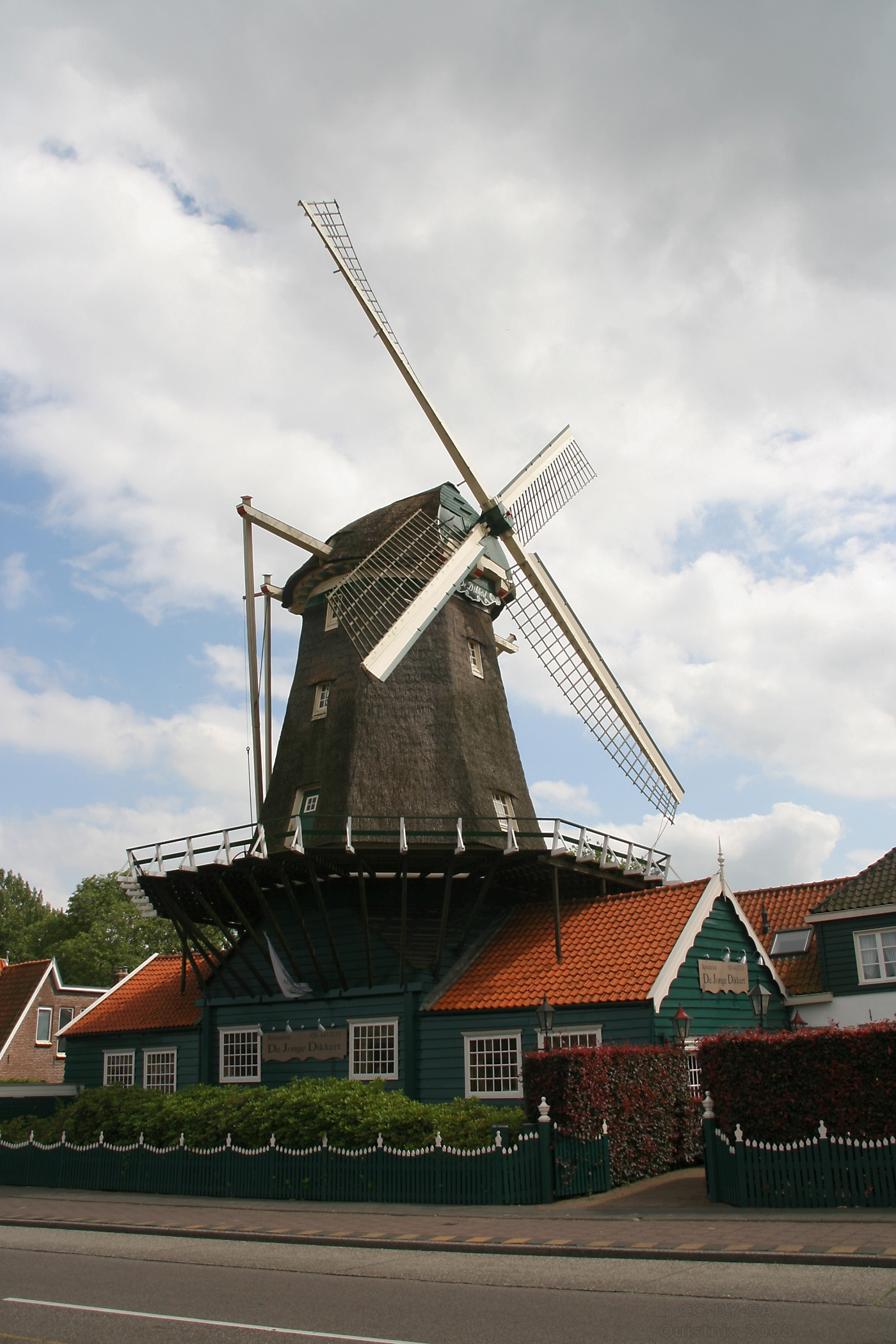
- Interactive map of Molen De Dikkert

Restaurant information
- Established: 1966
- Rating: Michelin Guide
- Location: Amsterdamseweg 104-a, Amstelveen, 1082 HG, Netherlands

Molen De Dikkert is a defunct restaurant located in a windmill in Amstelveen, in the Netherlands. It was a fine dining restaurant that was awarded one Michelin star in 1983, and retained that rating until 1992.

Restaurant De Dikkert went bankrupt in 1992. During the bankruptcy settlement, the restaurant, owned by Bob Goudsmit, was sold to Yen Ho Kai, who kept the restaurant running.

Arjan van Dijk was head chef in the time of the Michelin stars.

At present, the windmill houses restaurant De Jonge Dikkert, that is awarded a Bib Gourmand, since 1994.

Restaurant Molen De Dikkert was housed in a former windmill. The windmill was originally built in 1672 in Zaandam, as a sawmill. In 1896, the mill was moved to Amstelveen and served there as a flour mill. In 1929, the windmill stopped its working life and slowly fell into disrepair. The mill got renovated in 1965 and was ready for action again in 1966.

== See also ==
- List of Michelin starred restaurants in the Netherlands
