= Jan Stoeckart =

Dutch composer (1927–2017)

Jan Stoeckart (3 November 1927 – 13 January 2017) was a Dutch composer, conductor, trombonist and former radio producer, who often worked under various pseudonyms such as Willy Faust, Peter Milray, Julius Steffaro and Jack Trombey. In the UK he is best known for his composition Eye Level, the theme tune to the ITV series Van der Valk, which was a number one on the UK singles chart in 1973. He also composed "Homeward Bound", used as King Arthur's personal theme from the film Monty Python and the Holy Grail (1975).

== Life and works ==
Stoeckart was born in Amsterdam. He took piano and trombone lessons from the age of 12. After graduating from the Amsterdam Conservatory in 1950, he began his career as a professional musician (trombone and double bass) and conductor in various Dutch orchestras, including orchestras operated by Dutch public broadcaster NOS.

In 1974, he moved on to become a freelance composer for NOS and other Dutch public broadcasters. He also worked as a music producer for various radio shows, with which he popularised brass and choral music, and continued to compose and arrange music for Dutch films and for brass bands. He worked with the Metropole Orchestra and the Dutch Promenade Orchestra.

In the early 1960s, his conductor Hugo de Groot took him to London music publisher De Wolfe Music Ltd, where he signed a contract to compose stock and library music. He did so under various guises, such as Wily Faust, Jack Trombey and Peter Milray. He composed between 1200 and 1300 works for De Wolfe.

He died on 13 January 2017, in Hilversum, at the age of 89.

== Theme tunes ==
=== "Eye Level" ===
His biggest success proved to be Eye Level, the theme tune to the Van der Valk TV series from the early 1970s. ITV picked the tune, which Stoeckart had written a few years earlier, from the De Wolfe catalogue. The tune, loosely based on a German/Dutch nursery rhyme titled 'Jan Hinnerk' in German, and 'Catootje' in Dutch, from the 18th century, became an instant hit with viewers and record buyers; the recording – made by the Simon Park Orchestra – climbed to number one on the UK singles chart in 1973. The original title of the melody was "Amsterdam". "Eye Level" refers to the ever-present horizon in the Low Countries, which is always "at eye level to the beholder".

=== Others ===
- "Girl in the dark" (as Jack Trombey for the De Wolfe catalogue) – used for the UK TV espionage series Callan
- Floris – the popular Dutch TV series set in medieval times (1969)
- Het Simplisties Verbond ("The Simplistic Association") – Dutch satirical TV show
- "Domino" – the ITV sitcom Never the Twain
- "Trombones On Parade" – ITV's Junior Showtime
- "Horizontal Hold" (as Jack Trombey for the De Wolfe catalogue) – used by NFL Films and as the theme for CBS Sports' The NFL Today pre-game show from the mid-1970s to the early 1980s. CBS later used alternate arrangements of the song from the mid-1980s until 2002, and again in 2025 for the network's Throwback episode to celebrate 50 years since the first broadcast.
- "Pancho" – used by the Italian network RAI as the theme for 90° Minuto (90th minute), a show dedicated to Serie A highlights
- "Dusk" (as Jack Trombey for the De Wolfe catalogue) – used as part of Firaxis Games' Civilization V (2010)
- "Project in Operation" (as Jack Trombey for the De Wolfe catalogue) – used by Australian television production company Crawfords for the television series Matlock Police (1971–76)
- "Shoeshine" – used by Hong Kong TVB sitcom series Hong Kong 81–86 from 1981 to 1986
- Hot Spot – recorded in 1971 by Jack Trombey, and used for production logo
- Roving Report No. 2 (as Jack Trombey) – featured during the "Stop the Film" segment of the original October 1970 TV broadcast of the "Blackmail" sketch, as seen in Monty Python's Flying Circus series 2 episode 5
- Roving Report (as Jack Trombey) - used in Hundreds of Beavers
- "Sunlight Kisses" (as Jack Trombey for the De Wolfe catalogue) - featured in season 1, episode 5 of the Analog horror YouTube series The Walten Files albeit with lower tempo, pitch, and distorted quality. It is listed as "July 19th, 1959" in the official soundtrack.
- "Young Kingdom" (as Jack Trombey) - used as the start-up music of Harlech Television from its launch in 1968 to 1983

== Musicals ==
- Sinterklaas based on the Dutch version of Santa Claus.
