= Alvin Stardust discography =

- Studio albums: 11
- EPs: 2
- Live albums: 2
- Compilation albums: 12
- Singles: 48

This is the discography of British singer Bernard Jewry, better known as Alvin Stardust, including the discography of Shane Fenton and the Fentones, of which he was the lead singer.

As Shane Fenton, Jewry released eight singles with the Fentones and four solo singles (one of which was under another alias 'Jo-Jo Ellis'). The Fentones also released two instrumental singles which have been included here. No studio albums were released by the group, but one EP and two compilation albums have been released since they split.

As Alvin Stardust, he released thirty-five singles, one EP, eleven studio albums (two posthumously and three which were re-recordings of his hits) and two live albums. At least ten compilation albums have been released comprising Stardust's songs.

== Albums ==
=== Studio albums ===
Year	Title	Details	Peak chart positions					Certifications
Year	Title	Details	UK	AUS	FIN	GER	SWE	Certifications
1974	The Untouchable	Released: 8 March 1974; Label: Magnet; Formats: LP, MC, 8-track	4	35	25	41	—	UK: Silver
1974	Alvin Stardust	Released: 29 November 1974; Label: Magnet; Formats: LP, MC	37	—	5	—	—	UK: Silver
1975	Rock with Alvin	Released: 12 September 1975; Label: Magnet; Formats: LP, MC	52	—	8	—	44	
1983	A Picture of You	Released: 1983; Label: Stiff; Formats: LP, MC; Not released in the UK	—	—	—	—	—	
1984	I Feel Like... Alvin Stardust	Released: November 1984; Label: Chrysalis; Formats: CD, LP, MC	—	—	—	—	—	
1996	Still Standing – Greatest & Latest	Released: 1996; Label: CMC; Formats: CD; Re-recordings of hits; Also released as The Very Best Of by Go On Deluxe	—	—	—	—	—	
2001	The Alvin Stardust Story	Released: 23 July 2001; Label: K-tel; Formats: CD; Re-recordings of hits; Re-released with four extra tracks in 2006 as Come On Everybody	—	—	——		—	
2007	Rockin' Train	Released: September 2007; Label: Starfish Music; Formats: CD; With the Wild Black Jets; Germany-only release	—	—	—	—	—	
2010	I Love Rock 'n' Roll – Greatest Hits and More	Released: 17 May 2010; Label: Universal Music TV; Formats: CD; Re-recordings of hits	176	—	—	—	—	
2014	Alvin	Released: 27 October 2014; Label: Conehead UK; Formats: CD	—	—	—	—	—	
2021	Behind the Wheel	Released: 4 June 2021; Label: Cherry Red; Formats: digital download; Recorded in the late 1980s but had remained unreleased	—	—	—	—	—	
"—" denotes releases that did not chart or were not released in that territory.

=== Live albums ===
Year	Title	Details
1992	The Best of & The Rest of Alvin Stardust Live	Released: 1992; Label: Action Replay; Formats: CD, MC
1997	Live at Ronnie Scotts – The Birth of Rock 'n' Roll	Released: October 1997; Label: Royal; Formats: CD

=== Compilation albums ===
Year	Title	Details
1977	No Parking Space	Released: April 1977; Label: Magnet; Formats: MC
1977	Greatest Hits	Released: October 1977; Label: Magnet; Formats: LP, MC
1980	Rock On with Alvin	Released: February 1980; Label: Music for Pleasure; Formats: LP, MC
1982	I'm a Moody Guy	Released: March 1982; Label: See for Miles; Formats: LP, MC; Compilation of Shane Fenton & the Fentones songs
1982	Profile	Released: 1982; Label: Magnet; Formats: LP; Germany-only release
1987	20 of the Best	Released: August 1987; Label: The Collection; Formats: CD
1990	Greatest Hits	Released: 1990; Label: Connoisseur Collection; Formats: CD, LP, MC
1992	Jealous Mind – 16 Classic Tracks	Released: 1992; Label: Magnet; Formats: CD, MC
1993	The Hits Go On	Released: November 1993; Label: Stiff; Formats: CD
2003	The Complete A-Sides and B-Sides	Released: 5 May 2003; Label: EMI Gold; Formats: CD; Compilation of Shane Fenton & the Fentones songs
2005	The Platinum Collection	Released: 5 December 2005; Label: Warner Music; Formats: CD
2015	The Ultimate Collection	Released: 15 July 2015; Label: Rhino; Formats: CD, digital download

== EPs ==
Year	Title	Details
1977	I'm a Moody Guy	Released: October 1977; Label: EMI; Formats: 7"; EP of Shane Fenton & the Fentones songs
1983	Alvin Stardust	Released: September 1983; Label: Scoop 33; Formats: 7", MC; Compilation of Stardust's hits

== Singles ==
Year	Title	Peak chart positions										Album	Label
Year	Title	UK	AUS	AUT	BEL (FL)	BEL (WA)	FIN	GER	IRE	NL	SWE	Album	Label
As Shane Fenton & the Fentones
1961	"I'm a Moody Guy" b/w "Five Foot Two, Eyes of Blue"	22	—	—	—	—	—	—	—	—	—	Non-album singles	Parlophone
1962	"Walk Away" b/w "Fallen Leaves on the Ground"	38	—	—	—	—	—	—	—	—	—	Non-album singles	Parlophone
1962	"It's All Over Now" b/w "Why Little Girl"	29	—	—	—	—	—	—	—	—	—	Non-album singles	Parlophone
1962	"The Mexican" (The Fentones instrumental release, without Shane Fenton) b/w "Lover's Guitar"	41	—	—	—	—	—	—	—	—	—	Non-album singles	Parlophone
1962	"Cindy's Birthday" b/w "It's Gonna Take Magic"	19	—	—	—	—	—	—	—	—	—	Non-album singles	Parlophone
1962	"The Breeze and I" (The Fentones instrumental release, without Shane Fenton) b/w "Just for Jerry"	48	—	—	—	—	—	—	—	—	—	Non-album singles	Parlophone
1962	"Too Young for Sad Memories" b/w "You're Telling Me"	—	—	—	—	—	—	—	—	—	18	Non-album singles	Parlophone
1963	"I Ain't Got Nobody" b/w "Hey Miss Ruby"	—	—	—	—	—	—	—	—	—	—	Non-album singles	Parlophone
1963	"A Fool's Paradise"(solo release, without the Fentones) b/w "You Need Love"	—	—	—	—	—	—	—	—	—	—	Non-album singles	Parlophone
1963	"Don't Do That" (solo release, without the Fentones) b/w "I'll Know"	—	—	—	—	—	—	—	—	—	—	Non-album singles	Parlophone
1964	"Hey Lulu" b/w I Do, Do You"	—	—	—	—	—	—	—	—	—	—	Non-album singles	Parlophone
1972	"The Fly" (solo release, without the Fentones, credited as Jo-Jo Ellis) b/w "Perdona Mia"	—	—	—	—	—	—	—	—	—	—	Non-album singles	Fury
1972	"Eastern Seaboard" (solo release, without the Fentones) b/w "Blind Fool"	—	—	—	—	—	—	—	—	—	—	Non-album singles	Fury
As Alvin Stardust
1973	"My Coo Ca Choo" b/w "Pull Together"	2	1	2	3	10	14	3	3	11	—	The Untouchable	Magnet
1974	"Jealous Mind" b/w "Guitar Star"	1	27	10	12	46	9	5	1	—	—	The Untouchable	Magnet
1974	"Red Dress" b/w "Little Darlin'"	7	98	8	—	—	14	14	12	—	—	Alvin Stardust	Magnet
1974	"You You You" b/w "Come On!"	6	85	4	—	50	10	19	5	26	—	Alvin Stardust	Magnet
1974	"Tell Me Why" b/w "Roadie Roll On"	16	—	—	—	—	10	—	14	—	—	Alvin Stardust	Magnet
1975	"Good Love Can Never Die" b/w "The Danger Zone"	11	83	—	—	—	8	35	—	—	—	Rock with Alvin	Magnet
1975	"Chilli Willi" (Italy-only release) b/w "You, You, You"	—	—	—	—	—	—	—	—	—	—	Alvin Stardust	Magnet
1975	"Sweet Cheatin' Rita" b/w "Come On"	37	—	—	—	—	30	—	—	—	—	Non-album single	Magnet
1975	"Move It" b/w "Be Smart Be Safe (The Green Cross Code Song)"	55 (Note: "Move It" peaked at number 5 on the UK Breakers, an extension of the UK Singles Chart.)	—	—	—	—	23	—	—	—	—	Rock with Alvin	Magnet
1975	"Angel from Hamburger Heaven" b/w "Be Smart Be Safe (The Green Cross Code Song)"	—	—	—	—	—	—	—	—	—	—	Rock with Alvin	Magnet
1976	" It's Better to Be Cruel Than Be Kind" b/w "Here I Go Again"	—	—	—	—	—	—	—	—	—	—	Rock with Alvin	Magnet
1976	"The Word Is Out" b/w "No Parking Space"	—	—	—	—	—	—	—	—	—	—	No Parking Space	Magnet
1977	"Growin' Up" b/w "A Hobo's Life"	—	—	—	—	—	—	—	—	—	—	Greatest Hits	Magnet
1979	"Shakin' All Over" b/w "I Gotta Gotta"	—	—	—	—	—	—	—	—	—	—	Non-album single	Gale
1981	"Pretend" b/w "Goose Bumps"	4	36	5	1	—	—	36	6	3	—	A Picture of You	Stiff
1981	"A Wonderful Time Up There" b/w "Love You So Much"	56	—	—	14	—	—	61	21	20	—	A Picture of You	Stiff
1982	"Weekend" b/w "Butterflies	—	—	—	—	—	—	—	—	—	—	Non-album single (Note: "Weekend" was included on the Scandinavian release of A Picture of You.)	Stiff
1982	"I Want You Back in My Life Again" b/w "I Just Wanna Make Love to You"	—	—	—	33	—	—	—	—	—	—	A Picture of You	Stiff
1982	"A Picture of You" b/w "Hold Tight"	—	—	—	19	—	—	—	—	48	—	A Picture of You	Stiff
1983	"Walk Away Renee" b/w "Victim of Romance"	—	—	—	—	—	—	—	—	—	—	Non-album singles	Stiff
1983	"Corina Can" (Europe-only release) b/w "Forever Tonight" or "You and Me"	—	—	—	—	—	—	—	—	—	—	Non-album singles	Stiff
1983	"Candy" (Belgium-only release) b/w "Stealer"	—	—	—	36	—	—	—	—	—	—	Non-album singles	Lark
1984	"I Feel Like Buddy Holly" b/w "Luxury"	7	64	—	—	—	—	37	3	49	—	I Feel Like... Alvin Stardust	Chrysalis
1984	"I Won't Run Away" b/w "Tigers Don't Climb Trees"	7	—	—	—	—	—	—	7	—	—	I Feel Like... Alvin Stardust	Chrysalis
1984	"So Near to Christmas" b/w "Alright – O.K."	29	—	—	—	—	—	—	15	—	—	I Feel Like... Alvin Stardust	Chrysalis
1985	"Got a Little Heartache" b/w "Again"	55	—	—	—	—	—	—	—	—	—	Non-album singles	Chrysalis
1985	"(The) Clock on the Wall" (cancelled release) b/w "Show You the Way"	—	—	—	—	—	—	—	—	—	—	Non-album singles	Chrysalis
1985	"Sleepless Nights" b/w "Show You the Way"	—	—	—	—	—	—	—	—	—	—	Non-album singles	Chrysalis
1985	"So Near to Christmas" b/w "Alright – O.K." (reissue) + "(The) Clock on the Wall" b/w "Show You the Way" (double 7" pack)	81	—	—	—	—	—	—	—	—	—	Non-album singles	Chrysalis
1986	"I Hope and I Pray" (both tracks duets with Sheila Walsh) b/w "Speak of Love"	—	—	—	—	—	—	—	—	—	—	Shadowlands (by Walsh)	Chrysalis
1986	"Just Like Lovers" (both tracks credited as the Jury) b/w "Ride Your Bike"	—	—	—	—	—	—	—	—	—	—	Non-album singles	Chrysalis
1986	"Jailhouse Rock" (The Coming Out Mix) b/w "Love Is Real"	—	—	—	—	—	—	—	—	—	—	Non-album singles	Magnet
1989	"Christmas" b/w "Executive"	—	—	—	—	—	—	—	—	—	—	Non-album singles	Honey Bee
1995	"My Coo Ca Choo" (with Jo Brand) b/w "My Coo Ca Choo" (instrumental mix) / "My Coo Ca Choo" (extended mix)	—	—	—	—	—	—	—	—	—	—	Still Standing – Greatest & Latest	Elite
2004	"Boppin' on Saturday Night" (Germany-only release; all tracks with the Wild Black Jets) b/w "Rockin' All Over the Nation" / "Slam That Pedal Down"	—	—	—	—	—	—	—	—	—	—	Rockin' Train	Starfish Music
2014	"Tongue Tied" (promo-only release)	—	—	—	—	—	—	—	—	—	—	Alvin	Conehead UK
"—" denotes releases that did not chart or were not released in that territory.
