= Sleepless Nights =

Sleepless Nights may refer to:

== Film and television ==
- Sleepless Nights (1932 film), a British film directed by Thomas Bentley
- Sleepless Nights (2003 film), an Egyptian film
- Sleepless Nights (2022 film), a film featuring Adrian Alvarado and Jacqueline Buckingham
- "Sleepless Nights" (Doctors), a 2005 television episode
- "Sleepless Nights" (Rev.), a 2011 television episode

== Literature ==
- Sleepless Nights (novel), a 1979 novel by Elizabeth Hardwick

== Music ==
=== Albums ===
- Sleepless Nights (Aimer album), 2012
- Sleepless Nights (Gram Parsons album) or the title song, 1976
- Sleepless Nights (Lindisfarne album), 1982
- Sleepless Nights (Patty Loveless album), 2008

=== Songs ===
- "Sleepless Nights" (Everly Brothers song), 1960
- "Sleepless Nights (Never Let Her Go)", by Faber Drive, 2008
- "Sleepless Nights" (Armin van Buuren and Martin Garrix song), 2025
- "Sleepless Nights", by Alvin Stardust, 1985
- "Sleepless Nights", by G Herbo from Survivor's Remorse, 2022

== See also ==
- Sleepless Night (disambiguation)
