= Jaywalking =

Walking across a roadway outside of a crosswalk

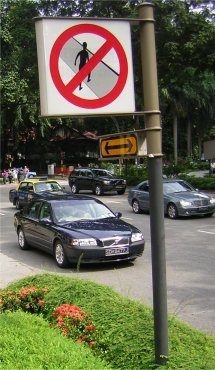
Sign prohibiting jaywalking in Singapore's Orchard Road

Jaywalking is the act of pedestrians walking in or crossing a roadway in a manner that contravenes traffic regulations. The term jay-walking originated in the United States as a derivation of the phrase jay-driver (the word jay meaning a greenhorn, or rube), referring to people who drove horse-drawn carriages and automobiles on the wrong side of the road. The term is not a historically neutral one.

The arrival of the automobile in the opening decades of the 20th century led to increasingly deadly conflicts in the street, and the public was generally unsympathetic to motorists or to early attempts to legislate pedestrian behavior. In response, the US automobile industry and associated organizations undertook public campaigns to frame pedestrians, newly impugned as jay-walkers, as a problematic element in the new automotive age. The first widely successful criminalization of jaywalking was enacted in Los Angeles in 1925, using legislation drafted by the auto lobby that inspired similar ordinances in other American cities.

Jaywalking laws vary widely by jurisdiction. In many countries, the word is not generally used and, with the exception of certain high-speed roads such as motorways, there are no laws limiting how pedestrians are allowed to cross public highways. Thus, globally speaking, legal texts use different concepts, one of which is Rules applicable to pedestrians, put forward by the Vienna Convention on Road Traffic. As an example of the subtleties and discrepancies of the laws governing pedestrian road traffic, even as a signing member of the Vienna convention, the United Kingdom does not have jaywalking laws: its Highway Code relies on the pedestrians making their own judgment on whether it is safe to cross based on the Green Cross Code. Some municipalities that previously criminalized jaywalking have legalized or decriminalized it.

== Origin ==
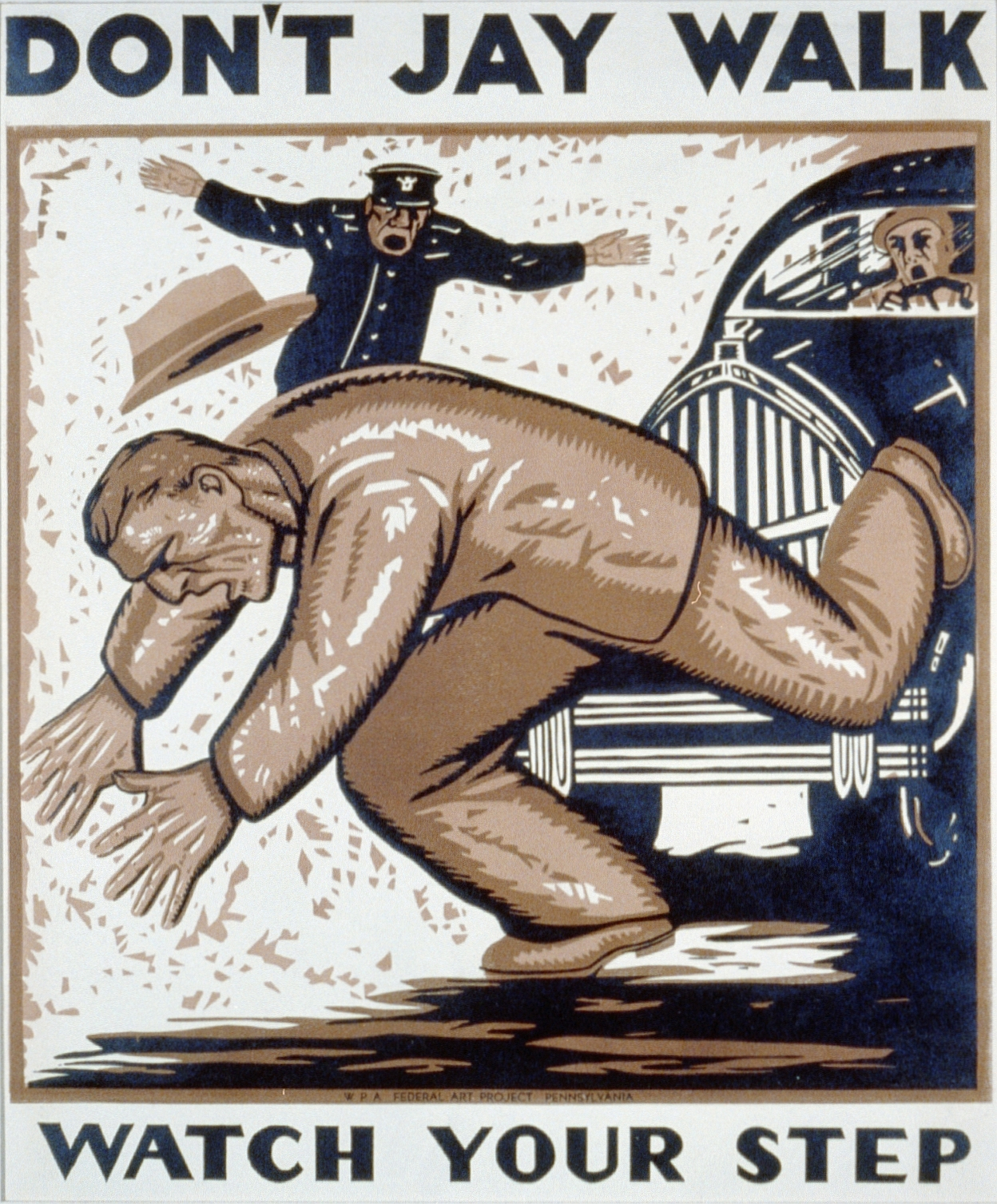
An anti-jaywalking poster created in 1937 as part of the United States WPA's Federal Art Project

While jaywalking is associated with pedestrians today, the earliest references to "jay" behavior in the street were about horse-drawn carriages and automobiles in 1905 Kansas: "jay drivers" who did not drive on the correct side of the street. The term swiftly expanded to pedestrians, and by 1909, The Chanute Daily Tribune warned "The jay walker needs attention as well as the jay driver, and is about as big a nuisance." No historical evidence supports an alternative folk etymology by which the word is traced to either the letter "J" (characterizing the route a jaywalker might follow), or "jake walk" (an early term related to a drunkard's walk).

The automobile lobby in the US took up the cause of labeling and scorning jaywalkers in the 1910s and early 1920s In 1912, for instance, Popular Mechanics magazine reported that the term was current in Kansas City: "The city pedestrian who cares not for traffic regulations at street corners, but strays all over the street, crossing in the middle of the block, or attempting to save time by choosing a diagonal route across a street intersection instead of adhering to the regular crossing, is designated as a 'jay walker,' in Kansas City."

Kansas City approved an ordinance banning diagonally walking across a street on July 19, 1911. On January 26, the Kansas City Times reported the first arrest for "jay walking" occurred at 6:15pm on Thursday, January 25th, 1912. Samuel Hebel was arrested after cutting diagonally across the intersection of 10th and Main in downtown Kansas City.

In 1915, when New York City's police commissioner Arthur Woods sought to apply the word "jaywalker" to anyone who crossed the street at mid-block, the New York Times protested, calling it “highly opprobrious” and “a truly shocking name.”

The earliest citation in the Oxford English Dictionary dates to 1917. The word was promoted by the pro-automobile lobby in the 1920s, according to historian and alternative transportation advocate Peter D. Norton. Today, in the US, the word is often used synonymously with its current legal definition, crossing the street illegally.

Originally in the US, the legal rule was that "all persons have an equal right in the highway, and that in exercising the right each shall take due care not to injure other users of the way". In time, however, streets became the province of vehicular traffic, both practically and legally.

== Causes ==
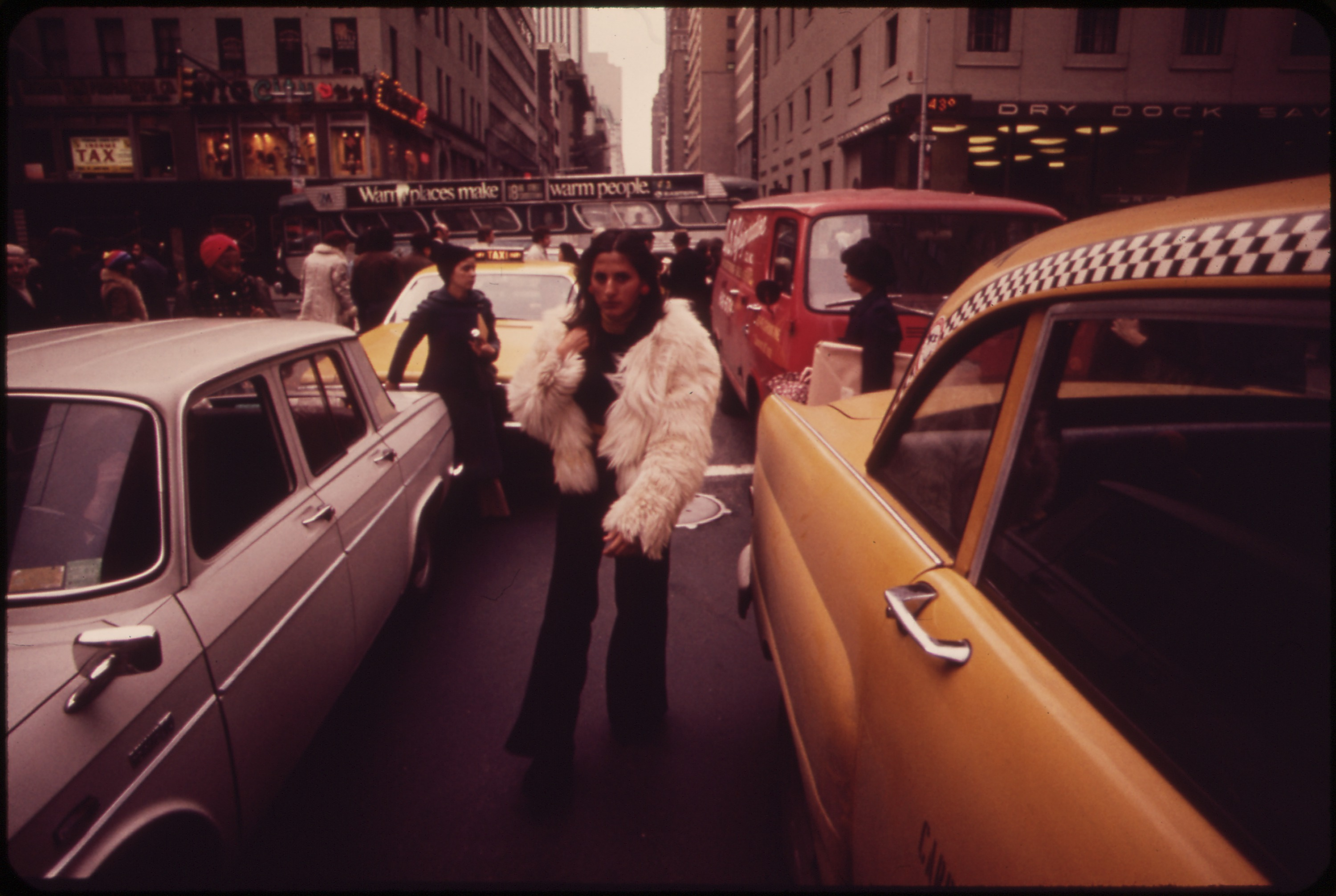
Jaywalkers cross a congested street in Midtown Manhattan, 1973.

People jaywalk for various reasons, including convenience, the expectation of the right to free movement of individuals, and sometimes even personal safety, generally to cross the street. Going to a crosswalk can require a long detour.

Although cultural norms about jaywalking vary by locality, the practice cannot simply be explained by corresponding differences in law. For example, Copenhagen and New York City have historically had similar restrictions on jaywalking at signalized crosswalks, but the practice is far more common in New York.

Pedestrians are often forced to walk outside crosswalks when they are blocked by cars due to traffic congestion or drivers stopping too far forward. The common practice of car-centric traffic-signal synchronisation produces green waves for motorists but not necessarily for pedestrians, who may encounter little or no conflicting traffic at cross streets where signals instruct them to wait.

Pedestrians may dislike crossing at intersections for other reasons, such as discomfort dealing with traffic from several directions (whereas a jaywalker at a location distant from an intersection only needs to observe at most two directions of traffic), or wanting to avoid the extra air emissions generated by vehicles stopping and starting (given that vehicular emissions are significantly less when vehicles are moving at steady speeds). In rural and suburban areas, people may jaywalk due to a lack of sidewalks. Some pedestrians are unwilling to observe lengthy wait times at signals. They are also more likely to make "informal crossings" at wide roads, or at locations where formal crosswalks are too distant to be practical for them to use.

In an academic study focused on behaviour in Montreal and Quebec City, for individual behaviour, holding a smartphone in one's hand reduces the probability of crossing on red. In contrast, looking at traffic was "over four times more associated with crossing illegally" than being distracted by a phone.

Some crosswalk signals that require a pedestrian to push a button are unusable for orthodox Jews on the Shabbat.

== Safety ==
Unsignalized marked crosswalks where drivers are more likely to yield to pedestrians are not necessarily safer than their unmarked counterparts, where pedestrians behave more cautiously, not expecting motorists to yield.

Many American newspapers publish stories that are critical of pedestrian road users' safety practices, while police departments often instigate education and enforcement campaigns to curb jaywalking. While nearly 60% of American pedestrian deaths occur outside of crosswalks, fewer than 20% occur in close proximity to a crosswalk.

== Legal view by jurisdiction ==
When used in the technical sense, jaywalking specifically refers to violation of pedestrian traffic regulations and laws and is therefore illegal. In many countries, such regulations do not exist and jaywalking is an unknown concept.

=== Africa ===
==== Zimbabwe ====
In Zimbabwe, jaywalking is illegal, according to the traffic laws gazetted in 2013 by the Ministry of Transport and Infrastructure Development. Disregarding designated crossing points or passing through red traffic lights carries a punishment of up to six months in jail or a 7,238.00 Zimbabwean Dollars fine (i.e. around $20), as part of the Highway Code. The code also deals with all road users; it used to emphasize rules for motorists and cyclists.

=== Asia ===
==== Mainland China ====
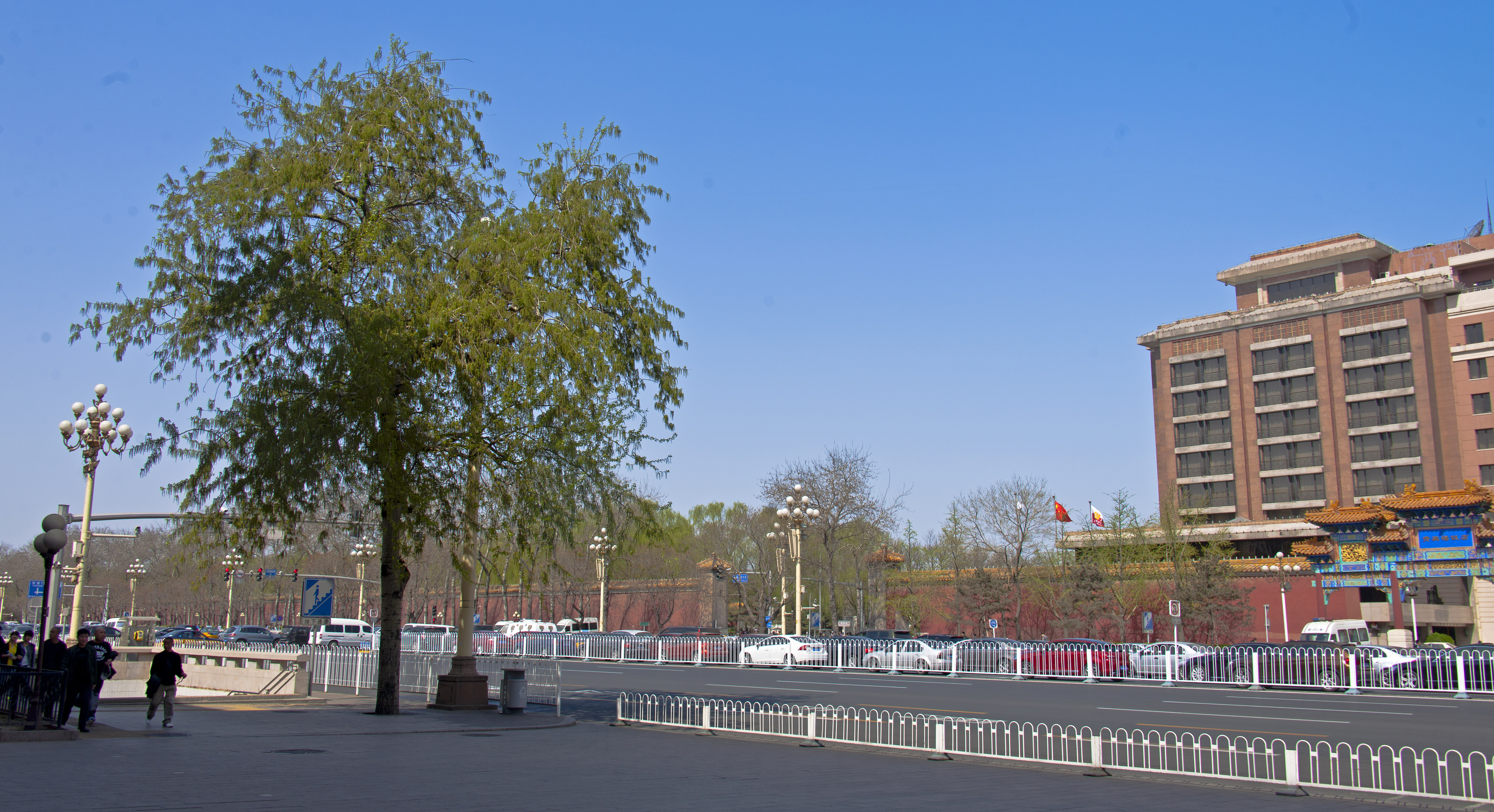
Fences, like here in Beijing, deter jaywalkers from crossing the road.

In recent years, jaywalking has become more strictly controlled in China as car traffic increased. Police have tested facial recognition to identify jaywalkers. The authorities applied a new method to deter jaywalkers by displaying their photo on large public screens in the area where the jaywalking occurred, to publicly shame any violator of pedestrian street rules. The system has flaws: the photo of the businesswoman Dong Mingzhu was displayed on those screens after the AI systems misinterpreted her appearance on a passing bus advertisement as a real person crossing the street in an illegal fashion.

==== Hong Kong ====
In Hong Kong, it is an offense to cross roads within the zigzag area around zebra crossings, or within 15 meters (yards) of other crossing points (including signal-controlled crossings, footbridges and subways) without using the crossing, or climb over fences to cross the road. It is also an offence to cross the road at a signalled crossing when it is red.

==== Israel ====
Israeli transit regulations section 110 states a person shall not cross a road unless they have checked to make sure it is safe to do so. Where there is a "nearby" pedestrian crossing, a pedestrian shall not cross the road except at the pedestrian crossing. Where there is no pedestrian crossing nearby but there is a "nearby" intersection, the pedestrian shall cross "near" the intersection. In any case, the pedestrian shall cross at a reasonable speed and in the shortest straight line across the road, without spending undue time on the road.

Israeli courts have ruled that the legislature left the term "nearby" deliberately vague and it must be evaluated on a case-by-case basis.

==== India ====
In India, jaywalking is not explicitly included in the law as an offence but is covered under the broader term 'obstruction of traffic' in state and metropolitan laws. Examples include section 28B of the Delhi Police Act, 33B of the Bombay Police Act and 92G of the Karnataka Police Act. However, jaywalking is common in cities because of the lack of regulated crossings and footpaths, ignorance of safety rules, and the poor regulation of related laws by authorities. Drives against jaywalking are conducted by the police departments from time to time and offenders are given fines of 100 to 500 Indian rupees, depending upon the jurisdictions. Drivers must yield the right of way for pedestrians at unsignalled crossings and marked pedestrian crossings.

==== Iran ====
In Iran, crossing outside crossing points within 150 meters (yards) of one or if the pedestrian light is red, as well as starting to cross when the light is flashing, has been prohibited since the 1970s. If in an intersection there is no pedestrian light, traffic lights would be considered and so it is illegal when it is red or orange. As of November, 2009, jaywalking carries fines from 300,000 up to 2,000,000 rials (US$9 to US$60). The law has almost never been enforced.

==== Philippines ====
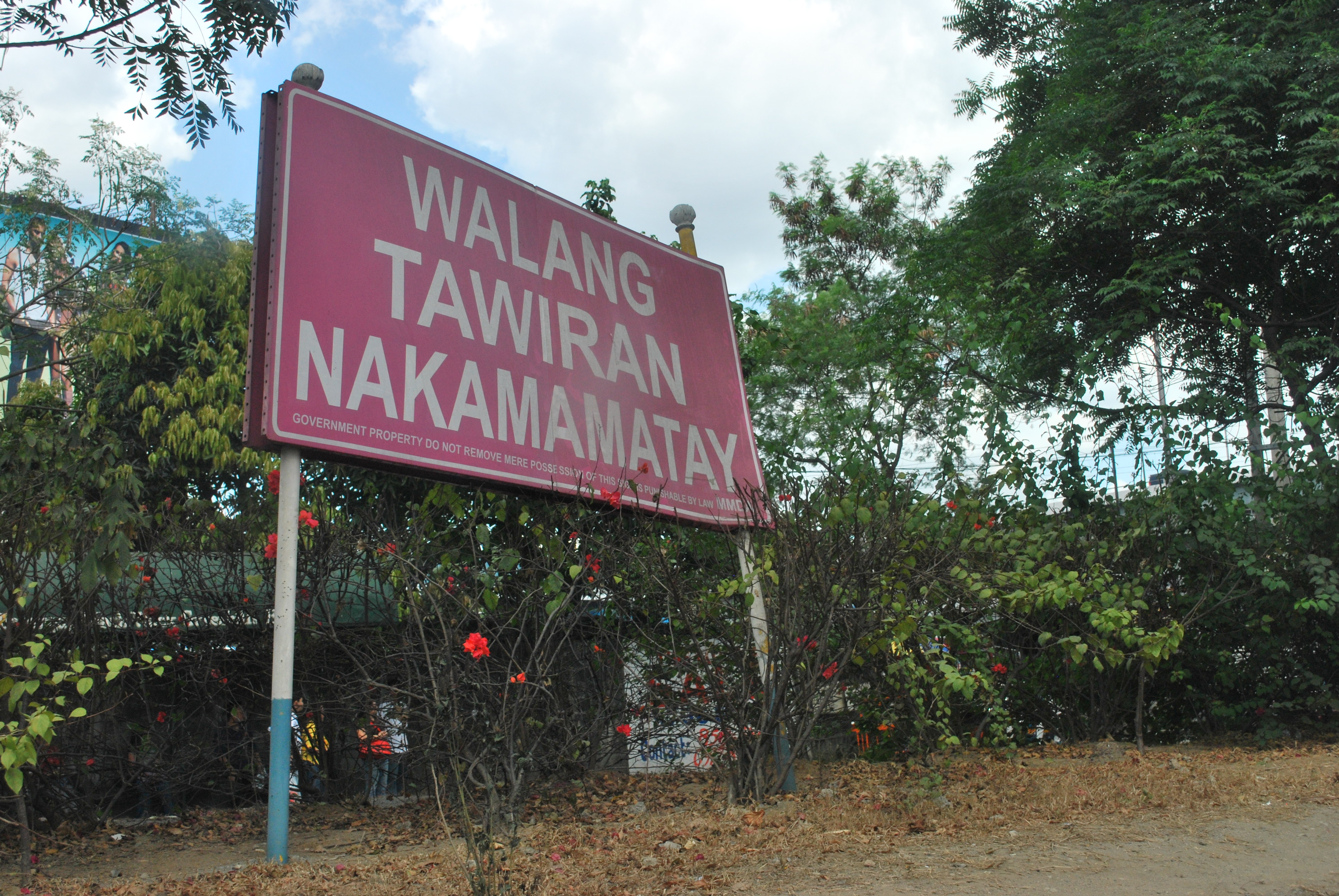
Anti-jaywalking sign of the MMDA located on the Ortigas Avenue road median in Metro Manila. The sign roughly translates to "There is no crossing. Deadly."

In the Philippines, jaywalking is not illegal. The Land Transportation and Traffic Code, which was passed in 1964, states that within commercial or residential areas, drivers of vehicles must yield the right of way to pedestrians crossing public roads on pedestrian crossings, except when traffic movement is regulated by traffic enforcers. Likewise, pedestrians must yield their right of way to motor vehicles when crossing a public road at any point other than a pedestrian crossing. It is however, illegal to cross or traverse an expressway on foot based on the Revised Rules and Regulations Governing Limited Access Highways.

Local government units may explicitly prohibit jaywalking in their localities through local ordinances, such as Metropolitan Manila Development Authority (MMDA) Ordinance No. 1 series of 1995, which supplements city and municipal anti-jaywalking ordinances in Metro Manila on major roads. The ordinance prohibits crossing a street, thoroughfare, or highway outside of crosswalks (except crossing straight at an intersection corner) and crossing under a footbridge. It also prohibits crossing against traffic signals or hand signals of traffic enforcers and walking outside sidewalks in a manner that obstructs, inconveniences, or prevents free passage of vehicles.

In 2007, the Supreme Court of the Philippines exemplified Article 2179 of the Civil Code of the Philippines in the context of jaywalking, ruling that a pedestrian who is injured as a result of jaywalking may forfeit the right to recover damages if their own negligence contributed to the injury. Alternatively, the pedestrian may only recover partial damages if the vehicle driver is found to have contributory negligence.

==== Singapore ====
In Singapore, jaywalking (not using a traffic crossing while within 50 meters; yards of it) is an offense. A fine of $50 is payable for the first offense. Repeat offenders can be charged $1000 and a jail term of 3 months, but the latter is rarely imposed. In 2011, 8,650 people were caught jaywalking and fined in Singapore. Between January and March 2012, Singapore prosecuted 1,758 for jaywalking, and between January and March 2013, 2,409 jaywalkers were fined.

=== Europe ===
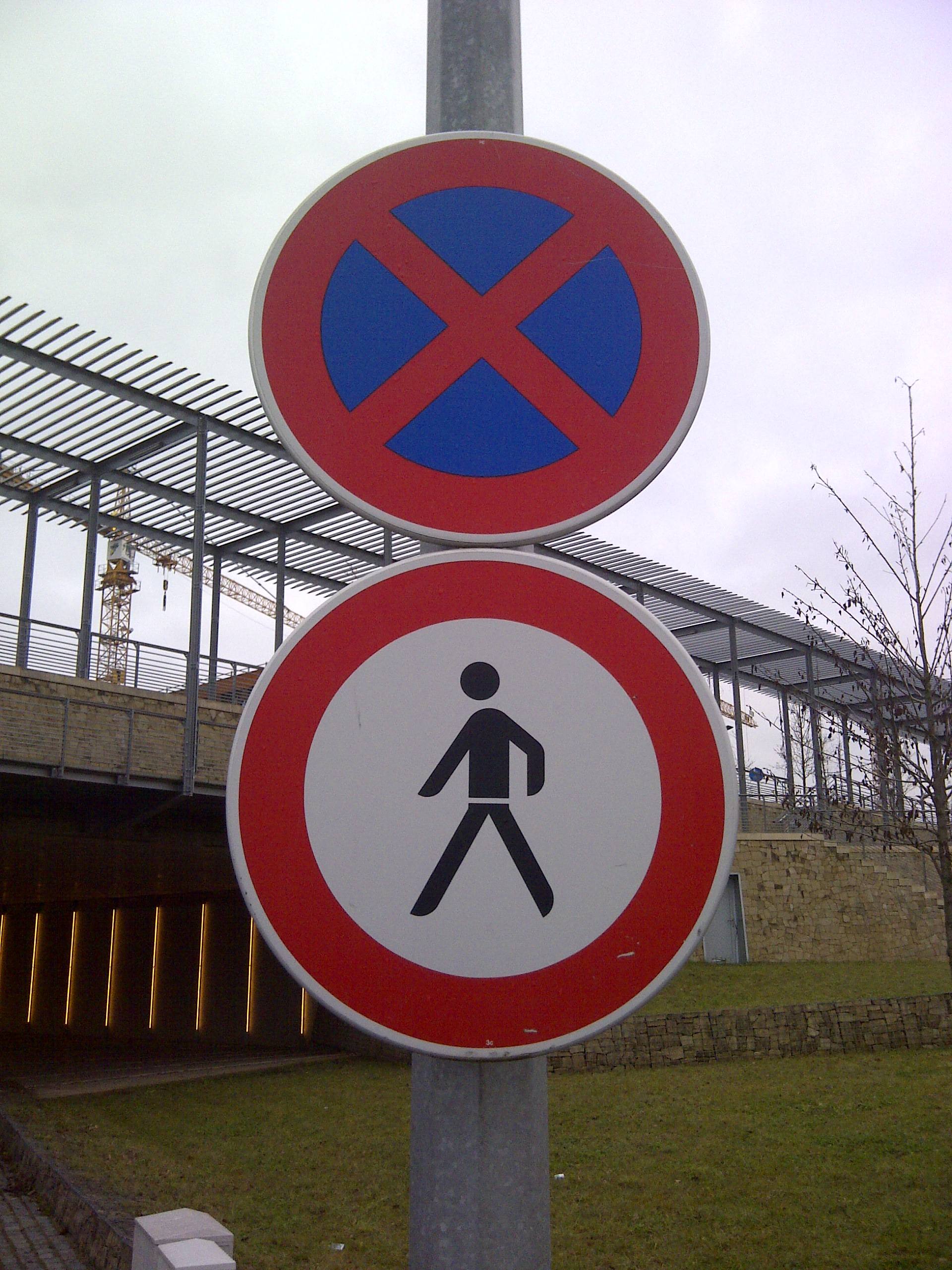
Pedestrian prohibition in Luxembourg

The motorway's status is signed at its entries and exits by a symbol, conforming to international agreements but specific to each country. Pedestrians are usually banned on European motorways.

In many European countries, pedestrians are banned from high speed roads such as motorways or expressways, but they are generally permitted on regular rural and urban roads. That is done in compliance with the Vienna Convention on Road Traffic, which also contains concepts addressing the question of the usage of the road or street by pedestrians for walking or crossing. Some countries like Ireland do not comply with the convention as rigorously as others. Laws and traditions vary from country to country.

Pedestrians account for 10% of motorway fatalities: 217 pedestrian fatalities on EU motorways in 2012 and 847 between 2010 and 2012. The rate is 20% in Poland, 17% in Great Britain, 15% in Spain and 10% in France. These include vehicle users who leave their vehicles after they have broken down, workers in work zones and individuals who illegally enter the motorway on foot.

==== Belgium ====
Pedestrians must use marked crossings within 20 meters if the speed limit is above 30 km/h (19 mph). However, any physical injury to a pedestrian caused by a traffic accident is compensated by the insurance of the drivers involved, regardless of the responsibility of the pedestrian, unless the pedestrian is over 14 and wanted the accident and its consequences to occur.

==== Czech Republic ====
Pedestrians must cross at a zebra crossing, underpass, overpass, or traffic-light intersection if such a crossing is within 50 meters (yards). Otherwise, they may cross the road perpendicular to its axis after assuring themselves that it is safe to do so. Jaywalking is punishable by a fine of up to CZK 1,500 on the spot, or CZK 2,000–5,000 in further proceedings.

==== France ====
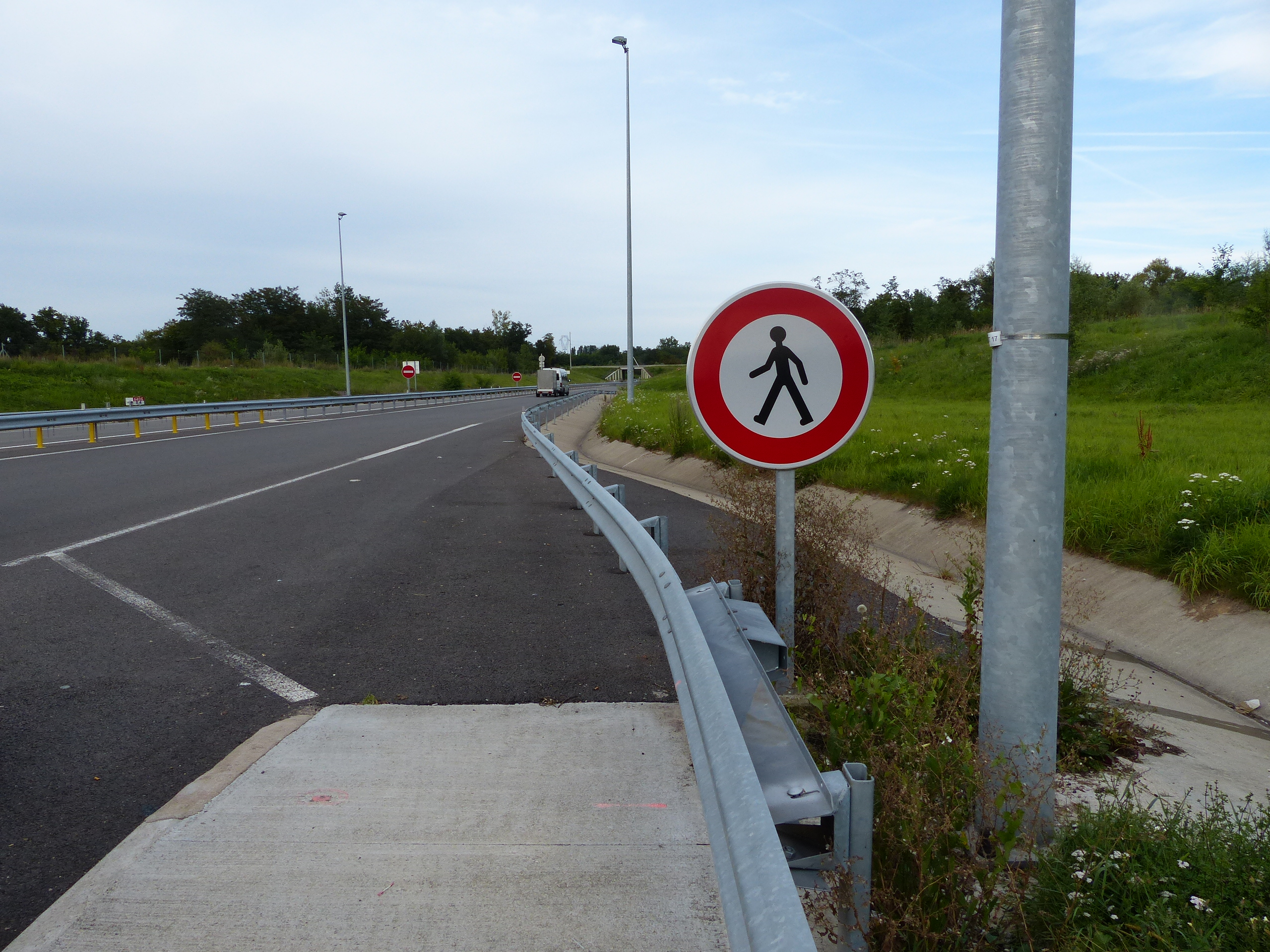
Panneau d'interdiction d'accès aux piétons en France near the A406 motorway. Notice the fence that motorists must cross to safety in case of breakdown.

Pedestrians are required to use sidewalks (if any), and zebra crossings for crossing a street if one is within 50 meters (yards); they must also

- cross at right angles to the road axis,
- only cross a place (including a market/town square in which motor vehicles are permitted) or any intersection on a formal crossing
- cross only at the green pedestrian light if in situ, and
- obey a police officer, if one regulates crossing.

More rules apply at night, on countryside roads, to groups of marching people, etc. Disregarding those rules may be punished by a fine of the lowest grade ("contravention de première classe": 11 to €17, or €33 if paid late) but few people were ever fined for such behavior; any actual fines were usually because they showed contempt instead of apologizing or providing some valid safety reason. On the other hand, drivers must always let pedestrians cross if they have already started or if they clearly demonstrate the intention to do so, even when the pedestrian is disregarding the rules, and will bear full responsibility if an accident occurs.

On French motorways, pedestrians are banned; in case of breakdown motorists are required to leave the car and walk away to safety, behind fences or lines marking the road boundaries, where no car can hit them. Nonetheless, some pedestrians are injured on motorways; in 2016, on the tolled motorway network:

- 16% of fatalities were pedestrians, an average of 23 pedestrian fatalities per year on the network.
- 69% of pedestrian motorway fatalities occurred on motorway lanes, 28% occurred on emergency lanes, and 3% in rest areas.
- injured pedestrians' presence on the motorway was due to breakdowns, stopping in emergency lanes (40%), accidents (28%), motorway staff (3%), providing assistance (2%), or other reasons (27%).

==== Germany ====
Pedestrians must follow rules when crossing the street. Even so, Section 1 of the Road Traffic Regulation (Straßenverkehrs-Ordnung [StVO]), the most important section, requires the road user not to endanger anybody. Car drivers must always be prepared to brake for pedestrians, especially for children and elderly people. On the other hand, pedestrians, according to Section 25 § 25, Abs. 3, StVO (VwV), must watch the vehicular traffic carefully and cross a street quickly and using the shortest way across the driving lanes.

Depending on the situation on the street, pedestrians may not cross the street except at intersections or within the markings of traffic signals or crosswalks. Pedestrians who cross the street at intersections or crossings must use existing traffic signals or crosswalks. Cars and bikes are required by law to give way to pedestrians (but not bicycle riders) at zebra crossings unless there is a traffic light. If one wants to cross the street outside the markings of traffic lights or crosswalks, one must carefully observe before and during the crossing that the road is clear, and wait before crossing if a vehicle approaches. A pedestrian may not interrupt the flow of traffic.

Although being within 15 meters (yards) is not considered "at" the crosswalk or traffic light, pedestrians may not cross the street within 30 meters (yards) of a crosswalk or 40 meters (yards) of a traffic light. During heavy traffic, pedestrians may not cross the street, as they might have to stop on a traffic lane. Typical fines for not using existing crosswalks or traffic lights in Germany are between €5 and €10.

==== Hungary ====
Whilst jaywalking is not specifically defined by the Hungarian Highway Code (KRESZ) as an offense, various restrictions and prohibitions apply for pedestrians crossing or walking along roads. Fines are applied at the discretion of the police of up to 30,000 forint for each offense, according to Section 21 (1-13) of the code. Pedestrians have the right of way on crosswalks and may cross the road at certain specified points such as at intersections if crosswalks are not available.

==== Ireland ====
Ireland maintains a jaywalking law, which requires a pedestrian to use a pedestrian crossing if they are within 15 meters (50 ft) of one. When crossing a road, pedestrians are advised to wait until it is safe to cross. Vehicles should give way to the pedestrian who uses a zebra crossing. Irish children are taught the Road Safety Authority safe cross code in schools where it teaches them to stop, listen, and look out for any oncoming traffic whilst crossing a road and only cross a road if safe to do so. It also advises them to use traffic lights and zebra crossings to cross a road rather than jaywalk. The Garda Síochána usually do not take action on jaywalkers unless they caused possible harm to drivers or others.

==== Italy ====
Warning sign of the start of the strada extraurbana principale where some restrictions are indicated

Pedestrians are allowed to cross a street without any recognized crossing point only if there are no zebra crossings within a range of 100 meters (yards), but they should be careful anyway. If pedestrians cross a street at a crosswalk, drivers must yield.
Walking on highways (autostrade) and main suburban roads (strade extraurbane principali) is always forbidden.

==== Netherlands ====
There is no concept of jaywalking in the Netherlands' traffic laws, so it is not an offense as such. Without zebra stripes, pedestrians must yield (to traffic crossing their path, not to turning traffic on their path), but at a zebra, road traffic must slow down and yield as soon as pedestrians seem about to cross.

==== Poland ====
Jaywalking is an offense. One must cross only at recognized crossing points if there is one within 100 meters (yards) (including pedestrian tunnels and footbridges). Otherwise, regular roads may be crossed with due care. Crossing dual carriageways (except motorways) is allowed only outside towns. Crossing tram and train tracks that are separate and parallel to street is always prohibited. Crossing on red lights is prohibited and considered to be an offense. According to regulations of "Prawo o Ruchu Drogowym" (Traffic Regulations Act) crossing the road outside the pedestrian crossing is allowed only if it does not endanger traffic safety or obstruct traffic. The pedestrian is not obliged to give priority to vehicles and should follow the shortest line to the opposite edge of the road, perpendicular to the road axis. Crossing the track separated from the road is only allowed in designated locations.

==== Portugal ====
It is illegal to cross the road except when the nearest zebra crossing is more than 50 meters (yards) away. Any crossing above that distance is legal. Pedestrians have priority over cars.

==== Romania ====
Jaywalking can be fined, but pedestrians are still permitted to cross the street on the corner of the street if no crosswalk exists, but they do not have priority over the cars.

==== Russia ====
Pedestrians must cross all roads at defined crossing points such as zebra crossings, pedestrian tunnels, footbridges, or unmarked crossings. Pedestrians are free to cross all roads without safety barriers, or a median if there is no crossing point in sight. Jaywalkers may be fined 500 rubles at the discretion of the police, or 1000-1500 rubles if intoxicated.

==== Scandinavia ====
It is legal to cross all roads except motorways in Denmark, Sweden, and Norway.

In Norway, a red man at the crossing is the signal for pedestrians not to begin crossing if it would impede cars or entail danger, but a person may walk across if there are no cars nearby. Risking oneself by running across in front of cars is not legal. Cyclists are required to stop at red lights, but because not everyone is aware of that, the Norwegian national cyclists' organization has proposed to end confusion by prohibiting all people from crossing at red lights.

In Denmark, it is illegal to cross the road outside of a pedestrian crossing if one is nearby.

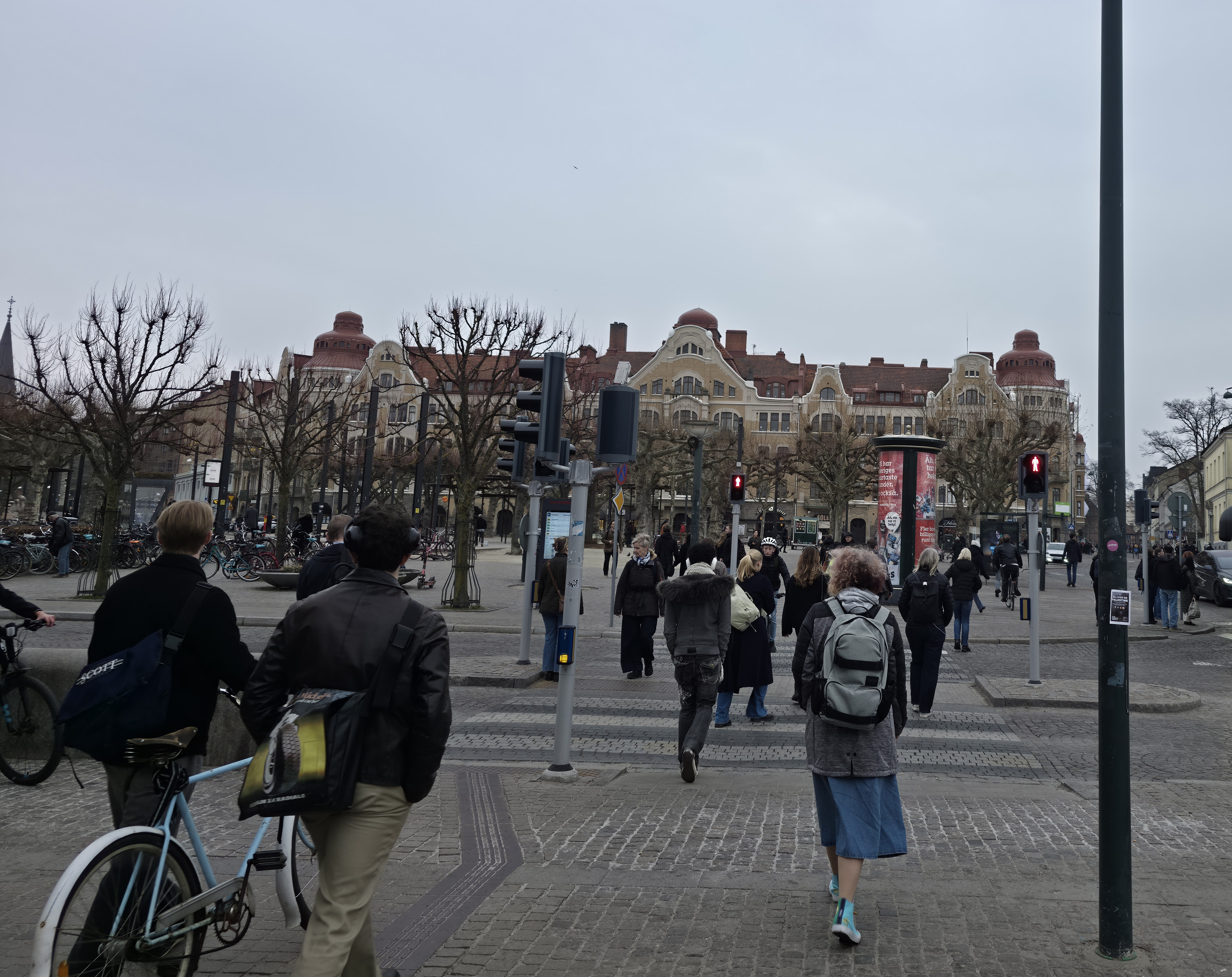
People walking against red lights in Lund, Sweden

In Sweden, it is illegal, but not punishable, for a pedestrian to cross at a red light. However, if doing this causes a traffic accident, the pedestrian could be convicted of negligence in traffic.

==== Serbia ====
In Serbia, it is illegal to cross roads other than at pedestrian crossings if there is a zebra crossing within 100 meters (yards).

==== Slovenia ====
In Slovenia, pedestrians must use zebra crossings and obey traffic signals. They may cross elsewhere only if the nearest zebra crossing is at least 100 m (110 yd) away and the lanes are not divided by a solid center line or median. Pedestrians have priority only at zebra crossings; elsewhere, vehicles are not required to yield. Violations are punishable by a fine of 40 euros.

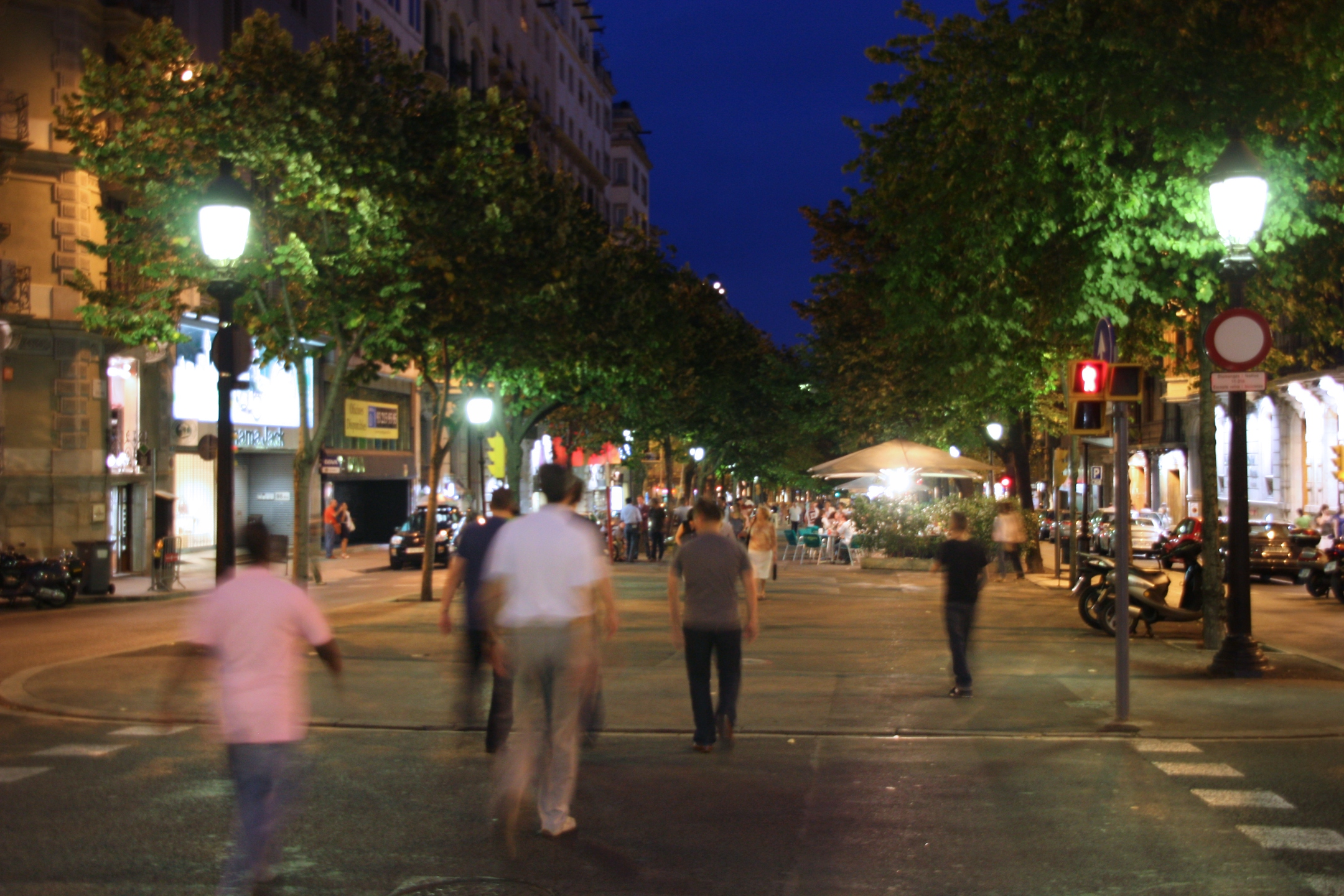
Pedestrians in Barcelona jaywalking with red light

==== Switzerland ====
In Switzerland, pedestrians are generally allowed to cross the street everywhere. They have priority on zebra crossings but should cross with care. However, they must use a pedestrian crossing, bridge or underpass if it is within 50 meters (yards). Certain types of roads must not be entered by pedestrians, such as highways and motorways. Failure to comply is subject to a fine of 20 Swiss Francs. Likewise, crossing or bypassing of closed railway gates is prohibited.

On motorways, fines may vary based on the situation. A driver driving at 100 km/h (62 mph) on a road with a 120 km/h (75 mph) speed limit, if the light visibility is 60 meters (200 ft) and the braking distance is 65 meters (213 ft), may be fined for not noticing a person on the road. Even if that person is suicidal, as in a court case in 2017, that fact does not matter. A fine of 210 Swiss francs fine is cheaper than the court costs. However, such circumstances may also be considered to be exceptional and unpredictable.

==== United Kingdom ====
Pedestrians prohibited sign in the United Kingdom

In England, Wales and Scotland (Great Britain) it is not illegal to cross or walk on any roads except motorways (where pedestrians and slow vehicles are not permitted), and roads with the "No Pedestrians" sign displayed. The Highway Code contains rules for crossing a road safely, but these are recommendations and not legally directly enforceable, though branches of the highway code may be used as supporting evidence in prosecutions. As with other advisory parts of the Highway Code, compliance and non-compliance can be used to claim/counterclaim/defend against liability in civil law claims such as insurance claims.

The term "jaywalking" can be obscure to those not exposed to American culture. There is no law preventing such an act. British citizens, like citizens from other countries where it is not an offense, are more prone to infringe jaywalking laws abroad. Transport for London identified tourists visiting London as being particularly vulnerable due to the personal assessment of risk expected of all pedestrians who cross roads. Some tourists copy locals' most risky crossing stunts, falsely assuming there was no advanced risk assessment involved or a higher right-of-way to vehicles, without understanding they have less right-of-way in all but a few places and times. A third reason is that many visitors are not used to all traffic driving on the left. Recent changes to the Highway Code have given priority to pedestrians waiting to cross a road.

A 2014 YouGov poll found 77% of Britons believed walking on roads when it is safe to do so should remain legal; 14% favored making it illegal. A similar US YouGov poll found 30% believed "jaywalking" should be legal—in most settlements, there is next to no centuries-old societal norm of specific roads on which it may in daytime be safe to walk, such as horse-frequented, cobbled or hump-calmed rural village.

When crossing, pedestrians are expected to use their judgement and wait until it is safe to cross. Under Rule 170 of the Highway Code, if a pedestrian is waiting to cross or has already started crossing the road (from either side) across a side street into which a car is about to turn, vehicles should always give way and let them leave the road safely (prior to January 2022 this only applied for pedestrians who had already started to cross the road). In UK schools, children are taught to cross roads safely through the Green Cross Code. British children are taught to "Stop, Look and Listen" before crossing a road, as demonstrated in the Think! campaign.

Unlike the rest of the UK, in Northern Ireland jaywalking is an offense. This is through article 38 of the Road Traffic (Northern Ireland) Order 1995, which states "If a pedestrian through his own negligence on a road endangers his own safety, or that of any other person, he is guilty of an offence." In both 2005 and 2006, hundreds of fines were issued for jaywalking, however from 2018 onwards this had reduced to approximately 50 per year.

=== North America ===
==== Canada ====
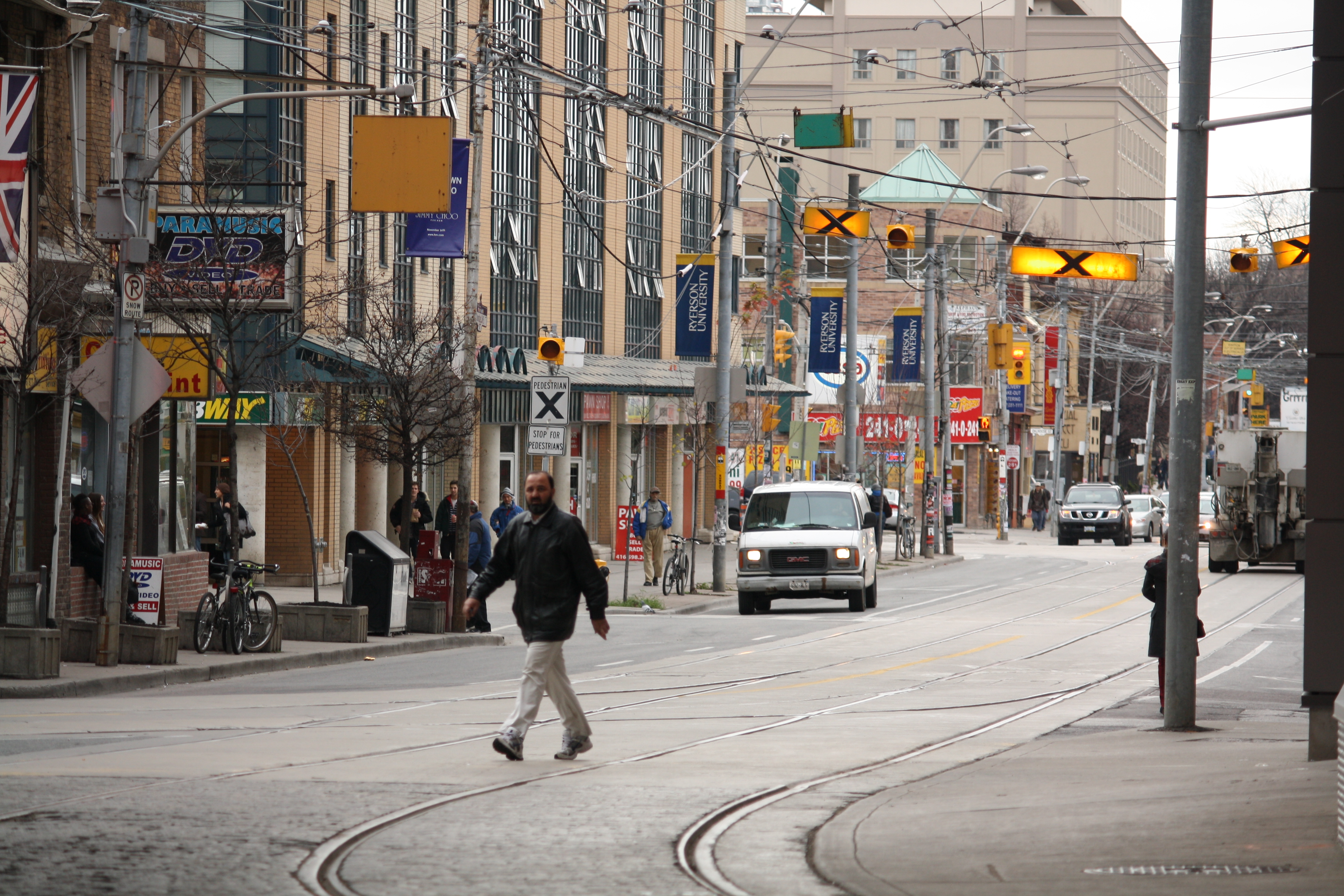
A pedestrian in Toronto walks across a street, several meters away from a pedestrian crosswalk.

Jaywalking is not in the Criminal Code and is not considered a criminal offense in Canada. No law on jaywalking exists at the federal level, although several provinces, territories, and municipalities have enacted regulations or by-laws that restrict when a pedestrian may cross a roadway. Enforcement of these provincial regulations and municipal by-laws remains extremely rare.

Section 144 of Ontario's Highway Traffic Act permits pedestrians to cross a roadway when they are not adjacent to a marked crosswalk and they yield to oncoming traffic, although the same section also requires them to use a marked crosswalk to cross the roadway when they are near one. Similar traffic regulations also exist in Quebec's highway safety code, and Saskatchewan's Traffic Safety Act. Most of these provincial regulations, in addition to municipal by-laws, do not use the term jaywalking to describe when a pedestrian unlawfully crosses a roadway.

As a result of differing provincial/territorial regulations and/or municipal by-laws, the fine that is charged for crossing a motorway varies across the country, from C$30 in Quebec, to C$697.50 in Nova Scotia. In Ontario, motorway crossing related fines are typically charged under section 144 of the Highway Traffic Act, or a municipal by-law, with an average fine of C$35; although the maximum fine a pedestrian can be charged under the Ontario's Highway Traffic Act is C$50.

==== United States ====
State road rules in the United States usually require a driver to yield the right of way to a pedestrian crossing a road when the pedestrian crosses at a marked crosswalk or an unmarked crosswalk. Unmarked crosswalks generally exist as the logical extensions of sidewalks at intersections with approximately right angles. Following the Uniform Vehicle Code, state codes often do not prohibit a pedestrian from crossing a roadway between intersections if at least one of the two adjacent intersections is not controlled by a signal, but they stipulate that a pedestrian not at a crosswalk must yield the right of way to approaching drivers. State codes often permit pedestrians to use roads that are not controlled access facilities and without sidewalks but such use is usually regulated. For example, in Florida they must keep to the shoulder of the leftmost side of the road and yield to any oncoming traffic.

At a signaled crossing, a pedestrian is subject to the applicable pedestrian traffic signal or, if no pedestrian signal is displayed, the signal indications for the parallel vehicular movement. A pedestrian signal permits a pedestrian to begin crossing a street during the "Walk" display; pedestrians are usually considered to be "jaywalking" only if they enter the crosswalk some other time. The meanings of pedestrian signal indications are summarized in Section 4E.02 of the national Manual on Uniform Traffic Control Devices.

Jaywalking is considered an infraction, but in some jurisdictions, it is a misdemeanor or requires a court appearance. The penalty is usually a fine. In some cities, such as Chicago, Los Angeles, and Boston, although prohibited, "jaywalking" has been so common that police generally cite or detain jaywalkers only if their behavior is considered excessively dangerous or disruptive, such as running out in front of a moving vehicle or crossing after the light is about to change to allow cross traffic to proceed. Penalties for jaywalking vary by state, and, within a state, may vary by county or municipality. A sampling of US cities found fines ranging from $1 to $1,000.

Enforcement of jaywalking laws varies by city. In 2017, a Boston Globe reporter spent the day attempting to get a $1 citation for jaywalking in downtown Boston traffic. The reporter walked against lights, crossed in the middle of streets, and across the middle of blocks and did not receive a ticket, even when committing infractions in front of police officers. Conversely, 463 people received a court summons for jaywalking in New York City in 2023; the following year, city council passed legislation allowing pedestrians to cross the street at any time without adhering to traffic signals.

Jaywalking at a signalized intersection may carry higher fines in some jurisdictions for disobeying the signalized controls. Many jurisdictions have a separate law defining the difference between jaywalking, or "disobedience of traffic signal controls". Some jurisdictions may fine pedestrians up to the same amount as a vehicle running a red light, but no driving points are issued, as the pedestrian was not driving at the time.

===== California =====
On 30 September 2022, California governor Gavin Newsom signed a bill decriminalizing jaywalking in the state of California. The bill, 2022 AB-2147, known as The Freedom to Walk Act, was initially introduced by Assembly member Phil Ting (D-19). It bars law enforcement from stopping and citing a pedestrian for "safe mid-block crossings" except in the circumstances where "a reasonably careful person would realize there is an immediate danger of a collision". This bill amended Section 21955 of the California Vehicle Code to include this provision. It also states that it does not relieve a pedestrian from the duty of using due care for their safety.

===== Safety considerations =====
In the United States, jaywalking is linked to pedestrian injuries and fatalities, but no available data provide an exact risk rate because of missing jaywalking frequency data.

In the United States, jaywalking is mainly an urban issue (71%), but it can also be a suburban or rural issue when no sidewalk is available.

In the United States, jaywalking might be understood as:

- walking against a pedestrian walk signal,
- crossing a street where there is no crosswalk (midblock crossing),
- crossing a street outside of a marked crosswalk where one is present, and
- walking on a street along with the traffic flow (ignoring designated pedestrian pathways).

However other pedestrian behavior might be considered as unsafe while not qualified of jaywalking, for instance, failure of drivers to yield for pedestrians, jogging/walking in the wrong direction, working on a parked car, leaning on a parked car, pushing a disabled car, standing between parked cars, and standing in a road.

Some pedestrian factors that lead to a jaywalking behavior were found to be pedestrian perceptions of risk, consumption of alcohol, perceptions of crossing devices, speed and pace of life, speed versus crossing-device speed, perceptions of enforcement risk, unawareness of pedestrian laws and safety, following the leader.

Some known environmental factors include absence of midblock crosswalks, width of roads, poor timing of crossing signals, poor conditions of sidewalks, absence of sidewalks in certain areas, capacity of sidewalks, weather, people with limited mobility, people with occupational risks, children and teens, parking areas near shopping centers, street repair and construction sites, major highways, one-way streets, location of attractions, and unlawful street-vending.

===== Racial bias =====
In California, differences by race in charging of pedestrians for jaywalking has led to assertions of racial bias and proposals to end considering jaywalking to be an offense.

California Assembly member Phil Ting proposed decriminalizing jaywalking. The bill, AB 2147, The Freedom To Walk Act, passed by the legislature and signed by Governor Gavin Newsom, took effect on January 1, 2023.

Seattle City Council members Bruce Harrell and Lorena González raised issues of bias in jaywalking tickets in that city as well.

=== Oceania ===
==== Australia ====
In Australia, it is illegal to start crossing the road at an intersection if a pedestrian light is red or flashing red. If no such pedestrian light exists, the traffic lights are used, making it illegal to proceed on red or orange. Furthermore, it is illegal to cross any road within 20 metres (yards) of an intersection with pedestrian lights or within 20 metres (yards) of any pedestrian crossing (including a zebra crossing, school crossing, or any other pedestrian crossing).

Crossing the street more than 20 metres (yards) from a signal or crossing is generally legal in Australia. "Jaywalking" is not a legal term in NSW or Australia. WalkSydney has claimed the common use of the American term in Australia leads people to the false belief that the same rules apply to people in Australia.

Common terms in use for starting to walk across a road at a signal when a red light is displayed include 'unsafe crossing', 'unsafe crossing behaviour' and 'crossing against the light'.

More than 8000 people in the Sydney CBD received fines for illegally crossing city streets from November 2013 to October 2015. More than double this figure received cautions. NSW Police issued 790 traffic fines in a two-week blitz in 2016 between August 8 and August 22 for pedestrian offences including crossing against the lights or "not at proper crossing zones", according to a spokesman for NSW Police. A similar operation over two weeks in August 2015 resulted in 244 infringements for pedestrian offences.

Some roads with a record of pedestrian accidents feature fences in the center to discourage pedestrians, but there is no law against crossing them. States set their own fines for starting to cross the road when a signal is red. The fine in Victoria is 2 penalty units. The fine is $50 in Western Australia.

In Hobart, Tasmania increasing the number of pedestrians crossing mid-block was considered a success metric, which is considered 'jaywalking' in other jurisdictions around the world. Increasing numbers of people crossing mid-block was understood to indicate improvements in perceived safety.

==== New Zealand ====
Pedestrians in New Zealand must, if possible, cross at right angles to the curb or side of the roadway unless they use pedestrian crossings or school crossing points. Pedestrians must use a pedestrian crossing, footbridge, underpass or traffic signal within 20 metres (yards). At intersections controlled by signals, pedestrians should wait for the green man to display and may not begin crossing when the static or the flashing red man is displayed. The fine for jaywalking is up to $35.

=== South America ===
==== Argentina ====
In Argentina, jaywalking is illegal.

==== Brazil ====
In Brazil, it is illegal to cross the road if the nearest zebra crossing is within 50 metres (yards). Pedestrians have priority over cars. According to CONTRAN resolution 706/17 from April 25, 2018, violators could pay a fine up to 44.19 Brazilian reals; however, the measure is rarely enforced.

== See also ==
- Automotive city
- Effects of the car on societies
- Green transport hierarchy
- Misdemeanor
- Pedestrian crossing
- Pedestrian village
- Rat running
- Reclaim the Streets
- Red flag traffic laws
- Shared space
- Walkability
