= Sleepless Night =

Sleepless Night may refer to:

== Film ==
- Sleepless Night (1960 film), a Soviet drama film
- Sleepless Night (2010 film), a Belgian short film
- Sleepless Night (2011 film), a thriller film by Frédéric Jardin
- Sleepless (2017 film) (working title Sleepless Night), an American remake of the 2011 film

== Music ==
- Sleepless Night, a 1992 album by Frankie Paul
- Sleepless Night, a composition by George Gershwin
- "Sleepless Night...", a song by CNBLUE from Can't Stop, 2014
- "Sleepless Night", a song by John Lennon and Yoko Ono from Milk and Honey, 1984
- "Sleepless Night", a song by Shinee from The Misconceptions of Us, 2013

== Other ==
- Sleepless Night, a Japanese racehorse born in 2004

== See also ==
- Insomnia
- Sleepless Nights (disambiguation)
