= Jay-driver =

"Carriage drivers driving on wrong side"

The term jay driver originated to refer to carriage drivers who drove on the incorrect side of the road. While the term may generally refer to an individual operating a vehicle in a manner not consistent with traffic laws, it was used more specifically to individuals who drive a vehicle on the incorrect side of the road. Merriam-Webster indicates that the first known use of the term is by The Junction City Union newspaper on 28 June 1905.

== Relationship to "jaywalker" ==
Most sources indicate that the term "jay driver" came before "jaywalker" there being numerous article headlines from 1905 through the next decade that include the term "Jay Driver." Peter Norton's book Fighting Traffic on page 78 indicates that in 1922 use of the term "jay driver" was an attempt by George A. Davies to use the known meaning of "jay walker" and apply it to drivers of vehicles. However, an opinion piece attributed to "A MAN BOOSTER" from the 17 January 1907 Salt Lake Telegram titled "Oh yes, there's the 'Jay Driver'" describes in it both jay walkers and jay drivers. However, another article from 11 November 1919 in The Pittsburgh Gazette Times cites from the Seattle Post-Intelligencer the text: "There are so many jay walkers and so many jay drivers that it hardly behooves any driver to talk about jay walkers, or any walker to mention jay drivers," clearly demonstrating that the term existed prior to that time.

== In media ==
A 1939 instructional video overdubbed by the voice of an official from a British agency indicates that the term was not isolated to the United States. Titled School For Jay-Drivers! the video provides an example of a motorcycle rider in Vienna failing to give the proper signal who is then required to attend a Sunday morning class in which an instructor explains what he did incorrectly and what the rules indicate he should have done.
