= Alvin Stardust (album) =

Studio album by Alvin Stardust
- Released: 1974
- Genre: Pop
- Label: Magnet Records
- Producer: Peter Shelley

Alvin Stardust chronology
| The Untouchable (1974) | Alvin Stardust (1974) | Rock with Alvin (1975) |

Singles from Alvin Stardust
- 1. "Red Dress" Released: 26 April 1974; 2. "You You You" Released: 23 August 1974; 3. "Tell Me Why" Released: 15 November 1974; 4. "Chilli Willi" Released: 21 February 1975

Alvin Stardust is the second album by English pop singer Alvin Stardust, released in 1974 on the Magnet Records label.

== Track listing ==
1. "Red Dress" (Peter Shelley)
2. "Heartbeat" (Alvin Stardust)
3. "Just Love Me Baby" (Alvin Stardust, John Fiddy)
4. "Where's She Gone" (Peter Shelley, Alvin Stardust)
5. "You You You" (Peter Shelley)
6. "Chilli Willi" (Peter Shelley)
7. "Jump Down!" (Peter Shelley, John Hudson, Dave Maynerd)
8. "Shake On Little Roller!" (Peter Shelley)
9. "Tell Me Why" (Peter Shelley)
10. "First Train Out" (Peter Shelley)
11. "Blind Fool" (Peter Shelley, Alvin Stardust)

All songs published by Magnet Records Ltd. 1974.

== Production ==
- Producer - Peter Shelley
- Recording Engineer - John Hudson
- Assistant Engineer - James Guthrie
- Musical Director - John Fiddy
- Front Album Cover Photography - Kate Simon
- Back Album Cover Photography - Brian Aris
- Design - National Publicity
