= My Coo Ca Choo =

Single by Alvin Stardust

from the album The Untouchable
- B-side: "Pull Together"
- Released: 1973
- Studio: RG Jones, London, UK
- Genre: Glam rock
- Songwriter: Peter Shelley
- Producer: Peter Shelley

Alvin Stardust singles chronology
"Eastern Seaboard" (1972)	"My Coo Ca Choo" (1973)	"Jealous Mind" (1974)

"My Coo Ca Choo" is a song by Alvin Stardust, released in 1973 as the lead single from his debut solo album The Untouchable (1974). The song reached number two on the UK Singles Chart in December 1973. The glam rock single fared even better in Australia, where it spent seven weeks at the top and was the best charting single in the country in 1974.

The song was written, sung, and recorded by Peter Shelley, using the glam rock name Alvin Stardust. Although he had already appeared as the original Alvin Stardust on the Lift Off television programme, Shelley was surprised when the record went straight into the chart the following week. As he had no desire to become his own stage name creation, he and Levy both agreed that if this act were to become more than just a one-hit wonder, then a "face" was required to be, and perform as, Alvin Stardust. The ideal person appeared, Bernard William Jewry, who at the time performed under the name Shane Fenton. The new "Stardust" then appeared on BBC Television's Top of the Pops just as the record had entered the UK Top 30, before finally reaching number 2. Shelley then followed up with a string of hits for Stardust, including "Jealous Mind", which went to number 1 in the UK in March 1974.

A cover version of the song was released as a comeback single by the post-punk band Department S in 2007, augmented by Madness bassist Mark Bedford.

== Charts ==
=== Weekly chart ===
Chart (1973/4)	Peak position
Australia (Kent Music Report)	1
Canada (RPM)	86
New Zealand (Listener)	13
United Kingdom (Official Charts Company)	2

=== Year-end charts ===
Chart (1974)	Peak position
Australia (Kent Music Report)	1
