= You You You =

Single by Alvin Stardust

from the album Alvin Stardust
- B-side: "Come On!"
- Released: 1974
- Genre: Pop, Glam rock
- Label: Magnet
- Songwriter: Peter Shelley
- Producer: Peter Shelley

Alvin Stardust singles chronology
"Red Dress" (1974)	"You You You" (1974)	"Tell Me Why" (1974)

"You You You" is a song recorded by Alvin Stardust in 1974, written and produced by Peter Shelley. The song spent 10 weeks on the UK Singles Chart, reaching number 6 in 1974. The single was released on Magnet Records, and included the song "Come On!" on the B-side, which was written by Alvin Stardust and produced Peter Shelley.

The song appears on numerous albums compilation albums, including Greatest Hits (1977), The Very Best of Alvin Stardust (1996), The Alvin Stardust Story (2007), and My Coo Ca Choo (2007).

== Tracks ==
- "You You You" - 2:50 (written and produced by Peter Shelley)
- "Come On!" - 2:45 (written by Alvin Stardust and produced by Peter Shelley)

== Charts ==
Chart (1974/75)	Peak position
Australia (Kent Music Report)	85
United Kingdom (Official Charts Company)	6
