= Johnny Theakston =

- Also known as: Shane Fenton
- Born: Johnny Theakston; 1944; Mansfield, Nottinghamshire
- Died: August 1961 (aged 16–17) Mansfield General Hospital, Mansfield, Nottinghamshire
- Genres: rock and roll
- Formerly of: Shane Fenton and the Fentones

Johnny Theakston, also known as Shane Fenton (1944–1961) was an early rock and roll singer who was the original lead singer to perform under the Shane Fenton stagename in his band Shane Fenton and the Fentones. Theakston would have been the face of the band, but died at the age of 17.

Theakston originally sang skiffle music, but changed to rock and roll when the genre started to emerge. Wanting to adopt an American sounding name, he became Shane Fenton: 'Shane' from the western, Shane, and 'Fenton' from a local printing firm. His backing groups would then be known as The Fentones. He soon befriended Bernard Jewry, who became a roadie for them and occasionally sang on stage with Theakston.

In 1961, the band sent a demo tape to European label Parlophone and the BBC and were offered an audition, but a few days before the audition was to take place, Theakston fell ill. Seeing how ill he looked, Jewry agreed to step in for him. Theakston subsequently fell severely ill and was rushed to hospital, where he died two days later. Jewry later recalled: "I found him sitting on the settee in the lounge, with blankets wrapped all around him, very ill and too weak to stand." Theakston's cause of death was heart failure: his heart had been weakened since contracting rheumatic fever as a child.

Because the BBC had given the group a slot on the Saturday Club radio show (and presumably under contract), they were unable to disband, and so continued with Jewry on lead vocals. Requested by Theakston's mother, Jewry took Theakston's stagename, and continued as Shane Fenton and the Fentones. Shane Fenton and the Fentones would have four songs in the UK charts between 1961 and 1962. Their best known song, "Cindy's Birthday", went to number 19.
