= Alvin Stardust =

English singer (1942–2014)

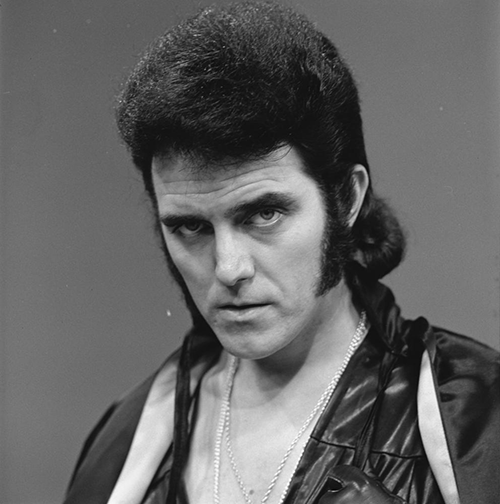
- Alvin Stardust in 1974

Background information
- Also known as: Shane Fenton
- Born: Bernard William Jewry; 27 September 1942; Muswell Hill, Middlesex, England
- Died: 23 October 2014 (aged 72) Ifold, West Sussex, England
- Genres: Glam rock; rock and roll; pop
- Instruments: Vocals; guitar
- Works: Alvin Stardust discography
- Years active: 1960–2014
- Spouses: Liza Goddard (m. 1981; div. 1989); Iris Caldwell; Julie Paton
- Website: Alvin Stardust Official Website

Bernard William Jewry (27 September 1942 – 23 October 2014), known professionally as Shane Fenton and later as Alvin Stardust, was an English rock singer and stage actor. Performing first as Shane Fenton in the 1960s, Jewry had a moderately successful career in the pre-Beatles era, hitting the UK top 40 with four singles in 1961–62. However, he became better known for singles released in the 1970s and 1980s as Alvin Stardust, a character he began in the glam rock era, with hits including "My Coo Ca Choo", the UK singles chart-topper "Jealous Mind", "Pretend" and "I Feel Like Buddy Holly".

== Early life and career ==
Bernard William Jewry was born 27 September 1942 in Muswell Hill, then in Middlesex (now in the London Borough of Haringey). Having moved at a young age to Mansfield, Nottinghamshire, where his mother ran a boarding house frequented by musicians and entertainers appearing locally, Jewry attended the Southwell Minster Collegiate Grammar School (now Southwell Minster School) in Southwell, Nottinghamshire, near Newark-on-Trent, as a boarder. He made his stage debut in pantomime at the age of four.

== Personae ==
=== Shane Fenton ===
In the early 1960s, Shane Fenton and the Fentones were an unknown teenage band who recorded a demo tape and mailed it in to a BBC programme with the hope of being picked to appear on television. While awaiting a reply from the BBC, the band's 17-year-old singer Shane Fenton (whose real name was Johnny Theakston) died as a result of the rheumatic fever he had suffered in childhood.

The rest of the band (guitarists Jerry Wilcock and Mick Eyre, bassist Graham George Squires and drummer Tony Hinchcliffe) decided to break up, but then unexpectedly received a letter from the BBC inviting them to come to London to audition in person for the programme. Theakston's mother asked the band to stay together, and to keep its name, in honour of her son's memory. Jewry, who was a roadie with them at the time, was asked to join the band and to use Shane Fenton as a pseudonym. The combo had a few hits in the UK Singles Chart: "I'm A Moody Guy", "Walk Away", "It's All Over Now" and their biggest hit, "Cindy's Birthday". These and their subsequent misses were all on Parlophone Records.

Jewry later also appeared in Billy Fury's movie Play It Cool (1962) and the Tommy Steele film It's All Happening (1963). He was managed by Larry Parnes.

=== Alvin Stardust ===
Jewry disappeared from the spotlight for a decade after the break-up of the Fentones, working in music management and performing at small venues with his first wife Iris Caldwell, the sister of Rory Storm. During the early 1970s, however, he acquired a new persona, Alvin Stardust, cashing in on the glam rock bandwagon. Alvin Stardust was clearly a reference to Ziggy Stardust, a David Bowie character based on the rocker Vince Taylor. His new name was given to him by Peter Shelley, the co-founder (with Michael Levy) of Magnet Records. Shelley had originated the persona of Alvin Stardust, writing, recording and singing the first Stardust single, "My Coo Ca Choo", in 1973.

Shelley had originally appeared on Lift Off with Ayshea in 1973 as Alvin Stardust, dressed up in a clown costume. Shelley, however, had no interest in performing live or making public appearances, so even as "My Coo Ca Choo" was climbing the charts, he was on the lookout for someone to take over the role of Alvin Stardust. Hal Carter, Jewry's manager, suggested his client as a substitute. Jewry took over as Stardust in time to lip-synch "My Coo Ca Choo" on its first Top of the Pops appearance. The new Alvin Stardust character look had sideburns and a black leather outfit.

All further Alvin Stardust records were sung by Jewry. Stardust had further chart successes with the hits "Jealous Mind" (UK No. 1), "You, You, You", "Red Dress" and "Good Love Can Never Die". In total, he amassed seven Top Ten entries, in a chart span lasting almost 25 years.

Stardust was part of the Green Cross Code road safety campaign Children's Heroes (1976), which saw him instructing children to look both ways before they crossed the road.

"Pretend" was a hit in the United Kingdom in 1981, reaching number four in the UK Singles Chart. It reached number one in the Dutch Top 40 in November 1981. The song was also successful in Portugal in 1983.

Alvin Stardust was a guest act on the Morecambe & Wise Christmas Show in 1981.

The singles "I Feel Like Buddy Holly" (written and produced by Mike Batt) and "I Won't Run Away" reached number 7 in the UK Singles Chart in 1984. "So Near To Christmas" was a minor hit, No. 29, in the same year.

He participated in A Song for Europe, the UK qualifying heat of the Eurovision Song Contest, in 1985, with the song "The Clock on the Wall". He finished in third place behind Vikki and Kerri Wells.

He was the subject of This Is Your Life in 1985 when he was surprised by Eamonn Andrews.

In 1986, Stardust performed the duet "I Hope and I Pray" with Sheila Walsh on her album Shadowlands, which was released as a single. That year he also performed at Windsor Castle as a lead in the Lloyd Webber–Rice musical Cricket.

Stardust also starred in the UK tour of Godspell and played Uriah Heep in David Copperfield – The Musical and Sir Billy Butlin in The Butlin Story at the London Palladium. In 2005 he starred as the Child Catcher in Chitty Chitty Bang Bang, also at the London Palladium.

Stardust made numerous television appearances, and continued to tour as a performer and singer. In 1989, he also hosted his own Sunday morning children's TV series on ITV called It's Stardust. It featured stories, songs, poems, jokes and also cartoons and shows for younger children, including The Adventures of Parsley, Little Miss and Satellite City.

In 1995, he joined the cast of the soap opera, Hollyoaks, playing the character Greg Andersen from October 1995 to July 1996.

On 2 October 2011, Stardust was initiated into the Grand Order of Water Rats, an entertainment fraternity.

In 2011, Stardust made a return to the stage as a singer rather than an actor, and played the Arts Guild Theatre in Greenock on 28 October 2011.

== Personal life ==
Stardust was married three times. In Liverpool in 1964 as Bernard W. Jewry he married Iris Caldwell, sister of Rory Storm and an ex-girlfriend of both George Harrison and Paul McCartney, having grown up with them in Liverpool. In 1981, Stardust married the actress Liza Goddard, again under the name of Bernard W. Jewry. Their daughter, Sophie Stardust (born Jewry), was critically injured at the age of two months after she fell down a set of stairs and suffered a severe fracture of the skull; she later recovered from her injuries. Stardust was married to the actress and choreographer Julie Paton at the time of his death.

He had two sons and two daughters, the youngest of whom had Cliff Richard as one of her godparents.

His eldest son, Shaun Fenton, was born in 1969. His birth was registered in December 1969 under the name of Fenton. The other son is the drum and bass producer Adam F.

Shaun Fenton was educated at Haberdashers' Aske's School for Boys and Keble College in Oxford, where he obtained a BA in Philosophy, Politics and Economics. He was headteacher for Sir John Lawes School and Pate's Grammar School, and has been headteacher for Reigate Grammar School since September 2012. He was appointed OBE in 2020 for his services to Education.

Stardust converted to Christianity in the late 1980s after meeting a group of American Baptist missionaries on a train.

== Death ==
Stardust died at home after a brief illness; this was confirmed by his manager on 23 October 2014. He was 72 years old. His funeral was held in St Thomas Church, Swansea, where he had married Julie Paton. His death came weeks before he was due to release his first album in 30 years, and six days after what became his last show at the Regal Cinema, Evesham. He had been diagnosed with prostate cancer 18 months earlier, which later metastasised. He was cremated in Morriston Crematorium and his ashes scattered in the grounds.

== Discography ==
- The Untouchable (1973)
- Alvin Stardust (1974)
- Rock with Alvin (1975)
- A Picture of You (1983)
- I Feel Like... Alvin Stardust (1984)
- Alvin (2014, posthumous release)
- Behind the Wheel (2021, posthumous release)
