= Peter Shelley =

British singer, songwriter and producer (1943–2023)

- Born: Peter Alexander Southworth; 28 February 1943; London, England
- Died: 23 March 2023 (aged 80) Victoria, British Columbia, Canada
- Genres: Pop
- Occupations: Singer, songwriter, record producer, music business executive
- Years active: 1960s–1980s
- Label: Magnet

Peter Shelley (né Peter Alexander Southworth; 28 February 1943 – 23 March 2023) was a British pop singer, songwriter, and music business executive. As a performer in the 1970s, he had UK hits with "Gee Baby" and "Love Me Love My Dog". He also originated the persona of Alvin Stardust, writing, singing and producing the first single released under that name, "My Coo Ca Choo". After another singer, Shane Fenton, took over as Alvin Stardust, Shelley continued to write and produce hit songs for him, including "Jealous Mind" and "You You You". Shelley was also the co-founder of Magnet Records.

== Career ==
Born in London, Shelley entered the British music industry in 1965, working initially as a song plugger with the music publisher Chappell & Co. He then joined EMI as personal assistant to their chief songwriter/record producer Norman Newell, his responsibilities covering various aspects of music co-ordination, production and administration. He supervised several minor recording sessions for Newell at EMI's Abbey Road Studios, so learning the basics of record production.

He later joined Decca Records as a talent scout, discovering for the label Amen Corner, Ten Years After, and Giles, Giles and Fripp, the nucleus of a band later to be called King Crimson. At Decca, Shelley worked with Dick Rowe and Ivor Raymonde and eventually began to write and produce for the company. He left Decca in 1968 to become an independent writer/producer, working with other writers such as Ben Findon and Marty Wilde. He had several minor European single hits during this period.

In 1973, Shelley co-founded Magnet Records with Michael Levy. Shelley's role was that of director of A&R and Levy's as president/general manager/administrator. Shelley wrote, produced and sang on Magnet's first release, Alvin Stardust's "My Coo Ca Choo", which reached No. 2 in the UK Singles Chart and No. 1 in many other countries including Australia where it became the biggest chart seller of 1974, staying at the top slot for seven weeks.

Having earlier appeared as the original Alvin Stardust on the television show Lift Off with Ayshea, Shelley was surprised when the record went straight into the chart the following week. However, as he had no desire to become his creation, he and Levy agreed that if this act was to become more than just a one-hit wonder, then a 'face' was required to be, and perform as, Alvin Stardust. Shane Fenton was chosen to fill the role and appeared on Top of the Pops the same week the record entered the Top 30 in November 1973. Shelley then followed up writing and producing a string of hits for Stardust.

As a performer in his own right Shelley had hits with "Gee Baby" and "Love Me Love My Dog". By 1975, Magnet had become one of the UK's most successful independent record labels under Shelley's creative direction. He also helped sign Guys 'n' Dolls and Chris Rea to the label. Shelley was presented with the Ivor Novello Award in 1975 for his services to the British music industry. However, due to differences between Levy and himself, Shelley resigned from Magnet in late 1975 to pursue an independent career.

During this period, he created the character Robotman, recording and producing an animated, music video of the song "I Wanna Be Your Robotman" (featuring Shelley as the lead vocalist). Shelley eventually showed the character to United Media Syndicate of New York, with whom a joint contract was made to further develop Robotman both as a comic strip and music driven, licensed property. The comic strip Robotman was an immediate success, followed by an appearance in the Macy's Day Parade in 1985 and a one-hour animated television special, Robotman & Friends, featuring Shelley's songs, airing one year later.

== Personal life and death ==
Shelley lived in Canada from the 1980s until his death. His son, John Southworth, is a Canadian pop singer-songwriter.

Shelley died of cancer on 23 March 2023, in Victoria, British Columbia, Canada, at the age of 80.

== Discography ==
=== Studio albums ===
List of albums, with chart positions
Title	Album details	Peak chart positions
Title	Album details	AUS
Gee Baby	Released: December 1974; Format: LP, MC; Label: Magnet, EMI	70
Girls and Places	Released: November 1975; Format: LP; Label: Magnet, EMI	—
"—" denotes releases that did not chart.

=== Singles ===
List of singles, with selected chart positions
Year	Title	Peak chart positions					
Year	Title	UK	AUS	GER	IRE	US	US AC
1974	"Gee Baby"	4	3	—	8	81	13
1975	"Bye Bye"	59 (Note: Chart position is from the official UK "Breakers List".)	90	—	—	—	—
1975	"Love Me Love My Dog"	3	17	43	4	—	—
1976	"Little Julie"	—	—	—	—	—	—
1976	"Wisconsin"	—	—	—	—	—	—
1979	"Baby It Feels So Right"	—	—	—	—	—	—
"—" denotes releases that did not chart or were not released in that territory.
