= Jealous Mind =

Single by Alvin Stardust

from the album The Untouchable
- B-side: "Guitar Star", "I'm In Love Again" (Italy)
- Released: 1973
- Recorded: 1973
- Genre: Glam rock
- Length: 2:25
- Label: Magnet Records (UK)
- Songwriter(s): Peter Shelley
- Producer(s): Peter Shelley

Alvin Stardust singles chronology
| "My Coo Ca Choo" (1973) | "Jealous Mind" (1973) | "Red Dress" (1974) |

"Jealous Mind" is a song recorded by Alvin Stardust in 1973, written and produced by Peter Shelley, and released in 1973. "Jealous Mind" was Stardust's only number-one single in the UK Singles Chart, spending a single week at the top of the chart in March 1974. The single was released on Magnet Records.

== Charts ==
| Chart (1974) | Peak position |
|---|---|
| Australia (Kent Music Report) | 27 |
| United Kingdom (Official Charts Company) | 1 |
