= I Feel Like Buddy Holly =

Single by Alvin Stardust
- A-side: "I Feel Like Buddy Holly"
- B-side: "Luxury"
- Released: April 1984
- Genre: Pop, Soft rock
- Label: Chrysalis
- Songwriter: Mike Batt
- Producer: Mike Batt

Alvin Stardust singles chronology
"A Wonderful Time Up There" (1981)	"I Feel Like Buddy Holly" (1984)	"I Won't Run Away" (1984)

"I Feel Like Buddy Holly" is a song recorded by Alvin Stardust in 1984, written and produced by Mike Batt. The song spent 11 weeks on the UK Singles Chart, reaching number 7 in May 1984. The single was released on Chrysalis Records, and included the song "Luxury" on the B-side, which was written and produced by Alvin Stardust.

The song appears on numerous compilation albums, including The Very Best of Alvin Stardust (1996), Alvin Stardust: New Recordings of His Greatest Hits (2001), Best of Alvin Stardust (2006), The Alvin Stardust Story (2007), and My Coo Ca Choo (2007).

Mike Batt, who wrote and produced the song, recorded his own version on the album A Songwriter's Tale (2008), alongside versions of songs he had written for other artists as well as re-recordings of Batt’s own songs. He said in a recent radio programme on Three Counties Radio that the song, alongside "A Winter's Tale (David Essex song)" and "Please Don't Fall in Love", was written about a relationship of his that wouldn't work for geographical reasons. However, he has now been married to that lady for 40 years.

== Tracks ==
- "I Feel Like Buddy Holly" - 4:04 (written and produced by Mike Batt)
- "Luxury" - 3:15 (written and produced by Alvin Stardust)

== Charts ==
Chart (1984)	Peak position
Australia (Kent Music Report)	64
United Kingdom (Official Charts Company)	7
