= Shane Fenton and the Fentones =

English rock and roll band

- Origin: Mansfield, Nottinghamshire, England
- Genre: Rock and roll
- Years active: 1960–1964
- Label: Parlophone
- Past members: Bill Bonney; Mick Eyre; Tony Hinchcliffe; Bernard Jewry; George Rodda; Johnny Theakston; Jerry Wilcock; Bobby Elliott

Shane Fenton and the Fentones were an English rock and roll group formed in Mansfield in 1960. Shane Fenton, the band's namesake, was actually the stage name of two different musicians; when the first Shane Fenton, actually named Johnny Theakston, suddenly died, he was replaced by Bernard Jewry who assumed the Shane Fenton identity. They had four top 40 hits with Jewry as their lead singer. Jewry would later find fame as Alvin Stardust.

== History ==
=== Beginnings: Johnny Theakston as Shane Fenton ===
The original lead singer of the group was Theakston, who was born in 1944. When Theakston was a child, he contracted rheumatic fever. Prior to playing rock'n roll, Theakston was playing skiffle. When the popularity of that genre faded, he switched to the more popular one.

The group's roots can be traced to the Diamond Skiffle Group and Roger Lymer and his Crusaders. Following the break up of the two groups, some members from each of them ended up in a group called Johnny Theakston with his Beat Boys. The group's name was changed to Johnny Theakston and the Tremeloes. In the late 1950s, the newly named group took part in, and won a talent show at the Mansfield Palais. Also at the show was a young Bernard Jewry. He would then join Johnny Theakston and The Tremeloes as their roadie. Occasionally Jewry would perform with them on stage. By 1960 Johnny Theakston decided that the group needed a more commercial name. He had given himself a more American image and adopted the name Shane Fenton. The Shane part was from the western, Shane. The Fenton part came from a local printing firm. The group had been doing well in the Nottinghamshire area, attracting more attention as they continued playing.

The group recorded a demo tape around 1961 which was sent to BBC. At the time the group consisted of Johnny Theakston on vocals, Jerry Wilcock and Mick Eyre on lead and rhythm guitars, Graham Squires on bass and Tony Hinchcliffe on drums. Shortly after the demo was completed, Squires was replaced on bass by Walter Bonney, who billed himself simply as Bonney, and stayed with the group though the following years.

As a result of the group's demo tape being heard, they were offered an audition. Just days before the audition was due to take place, Jewry who was a friend of Johnny Theakston's walked over to his house for a rehearsal. His mother said that Johnny had become ill and was in hospital. Two days later Jewry went back and Johnny's mother told him that her son had died at seventeen years of age. The cause of death was rheumatic fever. After the death of Theakston the group were going to call it quits. But because the BBC had responded to the audition tape that had been sent in, the band were invited to play on the Saturday Club radio pop show. Theakston's mother asked that they keep the group going as a tribute to her son as well as keeping the original name. Jewry took Theakston's place as Shane Fenton. According to an article in The Independent, Theakston's mother told Bernard Jewry that Johnny would have wanted him to take his place as Shane Fenton.

=== Bernard Jewry as Shane Fenton ===
Now with Jewry as Shane Fenton, the group had become regulars on Saturday Club. Tommy Sanderson who was the MD for the show became their manager, and they got a recording contract with EMI's Parlophone label. In September 1961, their debut single "I'm a Moody Guy" was released. Spending eight weeks on the chart, the single peaked at No. 22. Not long after the success of the single, the group was soon touring on rock'n'roll package show events. The next single was "Walk Away" which got to No. 38. They made an appearance in the Michael Winner directed film Play It Cool, which starred Billy Fury. The next single "It's All Over Now" peaked at No. 29 in April 1962, followed by the single "Cindy's Birthday" which made the top 20, peaking at No. 19 on 18 July 1962, and spending eight weeks on the charts.

=== The Fentones as a separate recording act (1962) ===
Following the lead of The Shadows, who maintained a successful career as a separate instrumental recording act while continuing to back Cliff Richard on his records and at live shows, The Fentones -- without vocalist Shane Fenton -- issued two instrumental singles in 1962. "The Mexican" peaked at #41, and "The Breeze and I" at #48. George Rodda replaced Tony Hinchcliffe on drums as of "The Breeze and I", and continued to play with the Fentones through 1964.

=== Dissolution and later years ===
After mid-1962, the group's records no longer charted. The last single for the group was "Hey Lulu" in 1964. After that the last time the group appeared together was on Saturday Club. They then broke up.

They did the club circuit through to the early 1970s in Northern England, with a final solo single for Shane Fenton ("Eastern Seaboard") released in 1972.

Jewry would later make a name for himself under the name Alvin Stardust.

The Fentones performed at the Pipeline Instrumental Rock Convention in London in 1995.

Lead guitarist Jerry Wilcock, who later worked as a bus driver, died in Paignton, Devon in June 2024.

== Discography ==
=== Extended plays ===
Shane Fenton and the Fentones EPs
Title	Label, cat	Year	Notes
A: "I'm a Moody Guy", "Walk Away" B: "Cindy's Birthday", "It's All Over Now"	EMI 2696	1977	

=== Singles ===
Shane Fenton and the Fentones singles
Title	Label, cat	Year	UK	Notes
"I'm a Moody Guy" / "Five Foot Two, Eyes of Blue"	Parlophone 45-R 4827	1961	22	
"Walk Away" / "Fallen Leaves on the Ground"	Parlophone R 4866	1962	38	
"It's All Over Now" / "Why Little Girl"	Parlophone R 4883	1962	29	
"Cindy's Birthday" / "It's Gonna Take Magic"	Parlophone R 4921	1962	19	
"Too Young for Sad Memories" / "You're Telling Me"	Parlophone R 4951	1962		
"I Ain't Got Nobody" / "Hey Miss Ruby"	Parlophone R 4982	1963		
"A Fool's Paradise" / "You Need Love"	Parlophone R 5020	1963		Solo Single
"Don't Do That" / "I'll Know"	Parlophone R 5047	1963		Solo Single
"Hey Lulu" / "Do, Do You"	Parlophone R 5131	1964		
"Eastern Seaboard" / "Blind Fool"	Fury FY 305	1972		Solo Single

The Fentones singles
Title	Label, cat	Year	UK	Notes
"The Mexican" / "Lover's Guitar"	Parlophone R 4899	1962	41	
"The Breeze and I" / "Just For Jerry"	Parlophone R 4937	1962	48	

In Record Collector's Rare Record Price Guide 2020, The Fentones' singles, if in "mint" condition, were valued at £10 for "The Mexican" / "Lover's Guitar" and £10 for "The Breeze and I" / "Just For Jerry".

Split singles
Act / title	Label, cat	Year	Notes
A: Shane Fenton and the Fentones - "Sparkling Brown Eyes" B: Ken Baxter - "I Go for You"	Blakey BUS 1	2004	
A: Adam Faith - "Carve Up" B: Shane Fenton and the Fentones - "Sparkling Brown Eyes"	Blakey BL 828		

=== Unreleased recordings ===
- Demo tape recorded in 1961 featuring Johnny Theakston

== Members ==
- Johnny Theakston aka Shane Fenton - vocals
- Bernard Jewry aka Shane Fenton - vocals
- Jerry Wilcock - lead guitar
- Mick Eyre - rhythm guitar
- Bill Bonney aka Bonney Oliver - bass
- Tony Hinchcliffe - drums
- George Rodda - drums
- Bobby Elliott - drums
