= Green Cross Code =

UK traffic safety education program

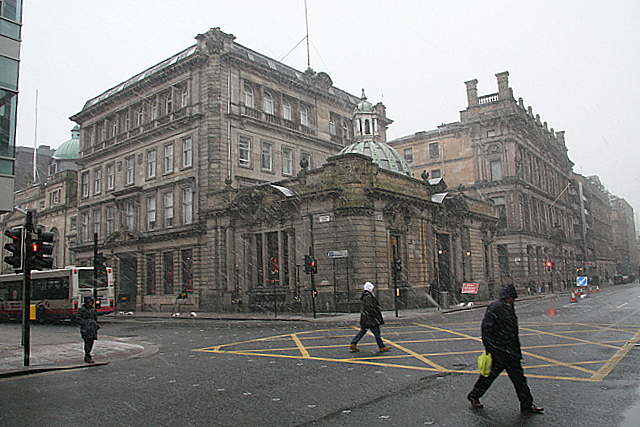
Stop, Look, Listen and Think. Pedestrians crossing Ingram Street, Glasgow

The Green Cross Code is a brand created by the National Road Safety Committee (now the Royal Society for the Prevention of Accidents, RoSPA) to raise awareness of pedestrian road safety in the United Kingdom. The multimedia Green Cross Code campaign began in 1970 and continues today.

The Green Cross Code replaced the earlier Kerb Drill (below) pedestrian safety campaign; the Kerb Drill's military style ("Halt! Quick march!") was deemed confusing to children by safety authorities.

== Tufty Fluffytail ==
Tufty Fluffytail badge

Prior to the introduction of the Green Cross campaign, a series of puppet animation public information films, featuring Tufty Fluffytail (narrated by Bernard Cribbins) (Note: Prior to Cribbins's involvement, a short film titled The Furry Folk on Holiday was produced in 1967.) were in regular broadcast rotation across the UK. Tufty Fluffytail, a childlike red squirrel character, was created in 1953 by Elsie Mills to introduce clear and simple safety messages to children. The success of the character led to the creation in 1961 of the Tufty Club for children under five years of age. Under its auspices more than 30,000 Tufty books about road safety were issued to parents. At its peak there were nearly 25,000 branches of the Tufty Club throughout the UK, and by the early 1970s an estimated two million children were members. The movement continued into the 1980s.

== The code ==
The Green Cross Code itself is a short step-by-step procedure designed to enable pedestrians to cross UK roads safely. While the Code has undergone several changes over the years, the basic tenets ("Stop, Look, Listen, Think") have remained the same. The 2018 version of the Green Cross Code reads as follows:

1. THINK! First find the safest place to cross
2. STOP! Stand on the pavement near the kerb
3. USE YOUR EYES AND EARS! Look all around for traffic and listen
4. WAIT UNTIL IT IS SAFE TO CROSS! If traffic is coming, let it pass
5. LOOK AND LISTEN! When it is safe, go straight across the road – do not run or walk diagonally
6. ARRIVE ALIVE! Keep looking and listening while you cross

== Green Cross Man ==
Green Cross Man
- Take it from Green Cross Man
- First appearance: 1970

The Green Cross Man is a costumed superhero character created in England in mid-1970 as an aid to teaching children and young people the Green Cross Code, and for promoting general road safety via television adverts. British weight-lifting champion David Prowse (1935–2020), who went on to portray Darth Vader in the film Star Wars (1977), played the character in a series of Public Information Films sponsored by the British Government's Central Office of Information for the Department of the Environment. In one animated film from 1976 however, Peter Hawkins voiced the character. The original adverts were broadcast on British television from 1975 to 1990.

In the adverts, the "Green Cross Man" has the power to teleport from his monitoring station known as "Green Cross Control" to any location where children are in need of pedestrian road safety instruction. He accomplishes this by use of a wristwatch-like "dematerialiser" device. On these missions he is sometimes accompanied by a robot companion known as the Green Cross Droid. His signature exclamation of surprise or disbelief is "Green Crosses!" and his slogan is "I won't be there when YOU cross the road, so always use the Green Cross Code". The first two adverts in the series had Prowse's voice dubbed by another actor due to his pronounced Bristol accent. In the third advert he appeared using his own voice.

In 2014, the Green Cross Man was revived, with Prowse playing the character in his 80th year, in two adverts produced for Road Safety Week in the United Kingdom. The new campaign was targeted at young adults alerting them to the danger of pedestrian accidents caused by distraction from using smartphones, and wearing headphones to listen to music whilst crossing roads.

== Other campaigns ==
In 1976, actor Jon Pertwee appeared in a PIF for the Green Cross Code introducing the mnemonic "SPLINK", which stood for:

- (First find a) Safe (place to cross, then stop)
- (Stand on the) Pavement (near the kerb)
- Look (all round for traffic and listen)
- If (traffic is coming, let it pass)
- (When there is) No (traffic near, walk straight across the road)
- Keep (looking and listening for traffic while you cross).

The film was later updated to cartoon form, voiced by Derek Griffiths.

In 1983, the television adverts employed a "Green Cross Code" rap based on the hit "The Message" by Grandmaster Flash. The original lyrics of "Don't push me cos I'm close to the edge" were replaced with "Don't step out when you're close to the edge." The advert was re-released for its 10th anniversary in 1993 with slightly different lyrics.

Other UK celebrities who have appeared in "Green Cross Code" PSAs include boxer Joe Bugner, vocalist Les Gray of the band Mud, footballer Kevin Keegan, and singer Alvin Stardust. These adverts used the banner "Be Smart...Be Safe."

== Kerb Drill ==
Before the Green Cross Code, The Kerb Drill was a procedure for pedestrians to cross streets safely, developed by Jocelyn Arthur Adair Pickard (1885–1962), a former Royal Engineer who became Director-General of RoSPA. The Kerb Drill encouraged pedestrians to look before they cross:

At the kerb halt!
Eyes right,
Eyes left,
Eyes right again.
If the road is clear,
Quick march—walk straight across.

The repeated look to the right is to check again for a vehicle in the closest lane. In countries that drive on the right-hand side of the road, "left" and "right" would need to be reversed.

== See also ==
- Highway Code
- Road Casualties Great Britain
