= Kissology Volume One: 1974–1977 =

Live album

Video by Kiss
- Released: October 31, 2006
- Recorded: 1974–1977
- Genre: Hard rock
- Length: 203 min. (disc 1); 176 min. (disc 2)
- Label: VH1 Classic Records
- Producers: Alex Coletti; Roger Coletti

Kiss chronology
| Rock the Nation Live! (2005) | Kissology Volume One: 1974–1977 (2006) | Kissology Volume Two: 1978–1991 (2007) |

Kissology Volume One: 1974–1977 is a DVD/Home Video released by the hard rock band Kiss on October 31, 2006. It contains two discs, plus one of three separate bonus discs sold only within initial first pressings. Also included with the DVD set is a 20-page color booklet, with commentary on each portion of the DVD. Some versions of this DVD have a replica of Kiss's "Spring Tour '75" backstage pass as an iron-on.

As a promotional effort for Kissology Volume One, National CineMedia presented a one-night screening of selected portions of the DVD at a limited number of theaters on October 26, 2006. The screening began with an introductory interview with Gene Simmons and Paul Stanley, and included the documentary of Kiss's 1975 trip to Cadillac, Michigan, as well as a 1976 Cobo Arena concert (both from Disc 1). The set was certified 5× platinum by the RIAA in the US.

== Track listing ==
=== Disc 1 ===
Long Beach Auditorium, Long Beach, CA (February 17, 1974)
| No. | Title | Length |
|---|---|---|
| 1. | "Acrobat" |

ABC's In Concert (recorded February 21, 1974, aired March 29)
| No. | Title | Length |
|---|---|---|
| 2. | "Nothin' To Lose" |
| 3. | "Firehouse" |
| 4. | "Black Diamond" |

The Mike Douglas Show (recorded April 29, 1974, aired May 21)
| No. | Title | Length |
|---|---|---|
| 5. | "Gene Simmons interview" |
| 6. | "Firehouse" |

Winterland Ballroom, San Francisco, CA (January 31, 1975 – Hotter Than Hell Tour)
| No. | Title | Length |
|---|---|---|
| 7. | "Deuce" |
| 8. | "Strutter" |
| 9. | "Got To Choose" |
| 10. | "Hotter Than Hell" |
| 11. | "Firehouse" |
| 12. | "Watchin' You" |
| 13. | "Nothin’ To Lose" |
| 14. | "Parasite" |
| 15. | "100,000 Years" |
| 16. | "Stanley's Solo + Black Diamond" |
| 17. | "Cold Gin" |
| 18. | "Let Me Go, Rock 'n' Roll" (incomplete) |

The Midnight Special (April 1, 1975)
| No. | Title | Length |
|---|---|---|
| 19. | "She" |
| 20. | "Black Diamond" |

Alive! promotional videos (1975)
| No. | Title | Length |
|---|---|---|
| 21. | "C'mon and Love Me" |
| 22. | "Rock and Roll All Nite" |

Documentary: Cadillac, Michigan (October 1975)
| No. | Title | Length |

Cobo Arena, Detroit, MI (January 26, 1976 – Alive! Tour)
| No. | Title | Length |
|---|---|---|
| 23. | "Deuce" |
| 24. | "Strutter" |
| 25. | "C'mon and Love Me" |
| 26. | "Hotter Than Hell" |
| 27. | "Firehouse" |
| 28. | "She" |
| 29. | "Parasite" |
| 30. | "Nothin’ To Lose" |
| 31. | "100,000 Years" |
| 32. | "Black Diamond" |
| 33. | "Cold Gin" |
| 34. | "Rock and Roll All Nite" |
| 35. | "Let Me Go, Rock 'n' Roll" |

EASTER EGG: Deuce Live at Coventry (1973)
| No. | Title | Length |

=== Disc 2 ===
So It Goes
| No. | Title | Length |
|---|---|---|
| 1. | "Interview" |
| 2. | "Black Diamond" (partial) |

The Paul Lynde Halloween Special (recorded October 19–20, 1976, aired October 31)
| No. | Title | Length |
|---|---|---|
| 3. | "Interview" |
| 4. | "King of the Night Time World" |

Budokan Hall, Tokyo, Japan (April 2, 1977 – Rock & Roll Over Tour)
| No. | Title | Length |
|---|---|---|
| 5. | "Detroit Rock City" |
| 6. | "Take Me" |
| 7. | "Let Me Go, Rock 'n' Roll" |
| 8. | "Ladies Room" |
| 9. | "Firehouse" |
| 10. | "Makin' Love" |
| 11. | "I Want You" |
| 12. | "Cold Gin" |
| 13. | "Do You Love Me" |
| 14. | "Nothin' to Lose" |
| 15. | "God of Thunder" |
| 16. | "Rock and Roll All Nite" |
| 17. | "Shout It Out Loud" |
| 18. | "Beth" |
| 19. | "Black Diamond" |

Don Kirshner's Rock Concert (May 28, 1977)
| No. | Title | Length |
|---|---|---|
| 20. | "I Want You" |
| 21. | "Hard Luck Woman" |
| 22. | "Love 'Em and Leave 'Em" |

The Summit, Houston, TX (September 2, 1977 – Love Gun Tour)
| No. | Title | Length |
|---|---|---|
| 23. | "I Stole Your Love" |
| 24. | "Take Me" |
| 25. | "Ladies Room" |
| 26. | "Firehouse" |
| 27. | "Love Gun" |
| 28. | "Hooligan" |
| 29. | "Makin' Love" |
| 30. | "Christine Sixteen" |
| 31. | "Shock Me" |
| 32. | "I Want You" |
| 33. | "Calling Dr. Love" |
| 34. | "Shout It Out Loud" |
| 35. | "God of Thunder" |
| 36. | "Rock and Roll All Nite" |
| 37. | "Detroit Rock City" |
| 38. | "Beth" |
| 39. | "Black Diamond" |

- During the middle of "Rock and Roll All Nite", the footage switches to the previous night, September 1. The remaining songs are also from this show.

EASTER EGG: Ace Frehley Wedding Performance (1976)
| No. | Title | Length |

=== Bonus Disc (Best Buy) ===
Cobo Arena, Detroit, MI (January 25, 1976 – Alive! Tour)
| No. | Title | Length |
|---|---|---|
| 1. | "Deuce" |
| 2. | "Strutter" |
| 3. | "C'mon and Love Me" |
| 4. | "Hotter Than Hell" |
| 5. | "Firehouse" |
| 6. | "She" |
| 7. | "Ladies in Waiting" |
| 8. | "Nothin' To Lose" |
| 9. | "100,000 Years" |
| 10. | "Black Diamond" |

=== Bonus Disc (Amazon and other major retailers) ===
Madison Square Garden, New York City (February 18, 1977 – Rock & Roll Over Tour)
| No. | Title | Length |
|---|---|---|
| 1. | "Detroit Rock City" |
| 2. | "Take Me" |
| 3. | "Let Me Go, Rock 'n' Roll" |
| 4. | "Firehouse" |
| 5. | "Nothin' To Lose" |
| 6. | "Shout It Out Loud" |
| 7. | "Black Diamond" |

=== Bonus Disc (Wal-Mart) ===
Capital Centre, Largo, MD (December 20, 1977 – Alive II Tour)
| No. | Title | Length |
|---|---|---|
| 1. | "I Stole Your Love" |
| 2. | "Ladies Room" |
| 3. | "Firehouse" |
| 4. | "Love Gun" |
| 5. | "Makin' Love" |
| 6. | "Christine Sixteen" |
| 7. | "I Want You" |
| 8. | "Calling Dr. Love" |
| 9. | "Shout It Out Loud" |
| 10. | "God of Thunder" |
| 11. | "Rock and Roll All Nite" |
| 12. | "Black Diamond" |

== Certifications ==
| Region | Certification | Certified units/sales |
|---|---|---|
| United States (RIAA) | 5× Platinum | 500,000^{^} |
^{^} Shipments figures based on certification alone.
