= Alive II Tour =

1977–78 concert tour by Kiss

- Tour by Kiss
- Poster to the concert in Des Moines
- Associated album: Alive II
- Start date: November 15, 1977
- End date: April 2, 1978
- Legs: 2
- No. of shows: 56

Kiss concert chronology
- Love Gun Tour (1977); Alive II Tour (1977–1978); Dynasty Tour (1979)

The Alive II Tour was a concert tour by Kiss, and was the follow-up to the Love Gun Tour, which ended in early September.

== History ==
The Alive II Tour saw Kiss perform 5 sold-out nights at Tokyo's Budokan, breaking their previous record of 4 one year earlier, as well as breaking the previous record by The Beatles. They also played three sold-out nights at Madison Square Garden in their hometown of New York City, and multiple nights in several other cities, including San Antonio; Landover, Maryland; Chicago; Detroit; and Providence, Rhode Island. The audience for the band were mainly young teenage crowds. AC/DC was the opening act for several concerts on this tour. The costumes and stage show were carried over from the Love Gun Tour, with minor changes made to the setlist.

During the show in Pittsburgh, Peter Criss had passed out in the middle of the concert. After a brief intermission, he returned to finish the show with his bandmates. The band would also be snowed in during the show in Richfield.

In the tour program for the band's final tour, Simmons reflected on the tour:

The Alive II stage show was a big production spectacle. We realized fans were paying as much for a concert, which only lasted for an hour or two, as you would for a record album which you could play over and over again for the price of a concert ticket. A concert was over with the snap of a finger so what are the memories you take from it? We thought visuals should be a big element of a Kiss concert and we were constantly brainstorming about what we could do in the show.

== Reception ==
Barry Paris, a reporter from the Pittsburgh Post-Gazette who attended the Civic Arena show in Pittsburgh, gave the show a positive review, stating: "Kiss (whose members acknowledge that their music is 'nothing profound') is a likable act not so much because of but in spite of its gimmickry. The crucial factor is their good (but not great) musicianship, which amounts to a B-plus/A-minus type of rock 'n roll and gosh darn, how can you not help but like the fresh-faced fans they attract?".

== Set list ==
1. "I Stole Your Love"
2. "King of the Night Time World"
3. "Ladies Room"
4. "Firehouse"
5. "Love Gun"
6. "Let Me Go, Rock 'n' Roll"
7. "Makin' Love"
8. "Christine Sixteen"
9. "Shock Me"
10. "I Want You"
11. "Calling Dr. Love"
12. "Shout It Out Loud"
13. "God of Thunder"
14. "Rock and Roll All Nite"

Encore

15. "Detroit Rock City"
16. "Beth"
17. "Black Diamond"

The set list for this tour was nearly identical to that of the Love Gun Tour, with the only exceptions being that "King of the Night Time World" and "Let Me Go, Rock 'n' Roll" took the place of "Take Me" and "Hooligan".

== Tour dates ==
List of 1977 concerts
Date	City	Country	Venue	Support act(s)
November 15, 1977	Oklahoma City	United States	Myriad Convention Center	Detective
November 17, 1977	Denver	United States	McNichols Sports Arena	Detective
November 19, 1977	Abilene	United States	Taylor County Expo Center	Detective
November 20, 1977	Lubbock	United States	Lubbock Municipal Coliseum	Detective
November 22, 1977	San Antonio	United States	Freeman Coliseum	Detective
November 23, 1977	San Antonio	United States	Freeman Coliseum	Detective
November 26, 1977	Tulsa	United States	Tulsa Convention Center	Detective
November 27, 1977	Kansas City	United States	Kemper Arena	Detective
November 29, 1977	Des Moines	United States	Iowa Veterans Memorial Auditorium	Detective
November 30, 1977	Omaha	United States	Omaha Civic Auditorium	Detective
December 2, 1977	St. Paul	United States	St. Paul Civic Center	Detective
December 3, 1977	Madison	United States	Dane County Expo Coliseum	Detective
December 6, 1977	Wichita	United States	Henry Levitt Arena	Detective
December 7, 1977	St. Louis	United States	The Checkerdome	Detective
December 9, 1977	Memphis	United States	Mid-South Coliseum	AC/DC
December 11, 1977	Indianapolis	United States	Market Square Arena	AC/DC
December 12, 1977	Louisville	United States	Freedom Hall	AC/DC
December 14, 1977	New York City	United States	Madison Square Garden	Detective
December 15, 1977	New York City	United States	Madison Square Garden	Piper
December 16, 1977	New York City	United States	Madison Square Garden	Piper
December 19, 1977	Landover	United States	Capital Centre	AC/DC
December 20, 1977	Landover	United States	Capital Centre	Piper
December 22, 1977	Philadelphia	United States	The Spectrum	Piper
December 27, 1977	Baton Rouge	United States	Riverside Centroplex Arena	Piper
December 29, 1977	Birmingham	United States	BJCC Arena	Piper
December 30, 1977	Atlanta	United States	The Omni	Piper
December 31, 1977	Greensboro	United States	Greensboro Coliseum	Piper

List of 1978 concerts
Date	City	Country	Venue	Support act(s)
January 3, 1978	Pembroke Pines	United States	Hollywood Sportatorium	Detective
January 5, 1978	Charlotte	United States	Charlotte Coliseum	Nantucket
January 6, 1978	Columbia	United States	Carolina Coliseum	Nantucket
January 8, 1978	Richfield	United States	Richfield Coliseum	The Rockets
January 11, 1978	Huntington	United States	Huntington Civic Center	The Rockets
January 12, 1978	Cincinnati	United States	Riverfront Coliseum	The Rockets
January 13, 1978	Pittsburgh	United States	Pittsburgh Civic Arena	The Rockets
January 15, 1978	Chicago	United States	Chicago Stadium	The Rockets
January 16, 1978	Chicago	United States	Chicago Stadium	The Rockets
January 18, 1978	Lexington	United States	Rupp Arena	The Rockets
January 20, 1978	Detroit	United States	Olympia Stadium	The Rockets
January 21, 1978	Detroit	United States	Olympia Stadium	The Rockets
January 23, 1978	Evansville	United States	Roberts Municipal Stadium	The Rockets
January 25, 1978	Buffalo	United States	Buffalo Memorial Auditorium	The Rockets
January 27, 1978	Springfield	United States	Springfield Civic Center	The Rockets
January 28, 1978	New Haven	United States	New Haven Coliseum	The Rockets
January 30, 1978	Philadelphia	United States	The Spectrum	The Rockets
February 2, 1978	Providence	United States	Providence Civic Center	The Rockets
February 3, 1978	Providence	United States	Providence Civic Center	The Rockets
March 28, 1978	Tokyo	Japan	Budokan	Bow Wow
March 29, 1978	Tokyo	Japan	Budokan	Bow Wow
March 31, 1978	Tokyo	Japan	Budokan	Bow Wow
April 1, 1978	Tokyo	Japan	Budokan	Bow Wow
April 2, 1978	Tokyo	Japan	Budokan	Bow Wow

=== Box office score data ===
List of box office score data with date, city, venue, attendance, gross, references
Date	City	Venue	Attendance	Gross	Ref(s)
November 17, 1977	Denver, United States	McNichols Sports Arena	10,586	$94,852	
November 27, 1977	Kansas City, United States	Kemper Arena	13,613	$100,151	
January 23, 1978	Evansville, United States	Roberts Stadium	14,144	$109,298	
January 25, 1978	Buffalo, United States	Memorial Auditorium	17,500	$112,636	
January 27, 1978	Springfield, United States	Civic Center	10,395	$72,765	
January 28, 1978	New Haven, United States	Coliseum	10,407	$76,000	

== Personnel ==
- Paul Stanley – vocals, rhythm guitar
- Gene Simmons – vocals, bass
- Peter Criss – drums, vocals
- Ace Frehley – lead guitar, vocals
