= Kiss 40 =

Greatest hits album by Kiss
- Released: May 23, 2014
- Recorded: 1973–2013
- Genre: Hard rock
- Length: 2:31:07
- Label: Universal Music Group
- Producer: Various

Kiss chronology
Monster (2012)	Kiss 40 (2014)	Kiss Rocks Vegas (2016)

Kiss 40 (also known as Kiss 40 Years: Decades of Decibels) is a compilation released by Kiss to celebrate the band's 40th anniversary.

== Information ==
The album contains one track from every album the band has released over their 40-year career including live albums, the 1978 solo albums, as well as songs from compilations and from the three instant live albums, which are commercially available for the first time. There is one unreleased song: "Reputation".

The album is the first released by the band since their induction into the Rock and Roll Hall of Fame.

A limited-edition Best Buy exclusive version was released that came with a T-shirt.

The Japanese edition features an exclusive track, "Hell or Hallelujah (Live at Budokan 2013)".

== Reception ==
Professional ratings
Review scores
Source	Rating
AllMusic	4/5 stars

Reception for the album has been mostly positive. In David Jeffries' review for AllMusic, he praised the album for being "filled with classics and desirable extras" but questioned the album's "odd one song-per-album rule" before finishing the review by commenting that "this is a triumph of format and the band's longevity, but not necessarily a knockout introduction".

== Track listing ==
Disc 1
No.	Title	Writer(s)	Original Album	Length
1.	"Nothin' to Lose"	Gene Simmons	Kiss, 1974	3:23
2.	"Let Me Go, Rock 'n' Roll"	Simmons, Paul Stanley	Hotter Than Hell, 1974	2:14
3.	"C'mon and Love Me"	Stanley	Dressed to Kill, 1975	2:55
4.	"Rock and Roll All Nite" (live in 1975)	Simmons; Stanley	Alive!, 1975	3:59
5.	"God of Thunder" (demo)	Stanley	The Box Set, 2001; originally from Destroyer, 1976	2:55
6.	"Beth"	Bob Ezrin, Peter Criss, Stan Penridge	Destroyer	2:45
7.	"Hard Luck Woman"	Stanley	Rock and Roll Over, 1976	3:32
8.	"Reputation" (unreleased demo)	Simmons	Previously unreleased, 2014	5:39
9.	"Christine Sixteen"	Simmons	Love Gun, 1977	3:11
10.	"Shout It Out Loud" (live in 1977)	Ezrin, Simmons, Stanley	Alive II, 1977	3:25
11.	"Strutter ‘78"	Simmons, Stanley	Double Platinum, 1978	3:40
12.	"You Matter to Me"	John Vastano, Michael Morgan, Vini Poncia	Peter Criss, 1978	3:14
13.	"Radioactive"	Simmons	Gene Simmons, 1978	3:51
14.	"New York Groove"	Russ Ballard	Ace Frehley, 1978	2:59
15.	"Hold Me, Touch Me (Think of Me When We're Apart)"	Stanley	Paul Stanley, 1978	3:39
16.	"I Was Made for Lovin' You" (single edit)	Desmond Child, Stanley, Poncia	Dynasty, 1979	4:01
17.	"Shandi"	Stanley, Poncia	Unmasked, 1980	3:34
18.	"A World Without Heroes"	Ezrin, Simmons, Lou Reed, Stanley	Music From “The Elder”, 1981	2:37
19.	"I Love It Loud" (Remix 1985)	Simmons, Vinnie Vincent	Creatures of the Night, 1982	4:12
20.	"Down on Your Knees"	Mikel Japp, Stanley, Bryan Adams	Killers, 1982	3:27
21.	"Lick It Up"	Stanley, Vincent	Lick It Up, 1983	3:53
22.	"Heaven's on Fire"	Child, Stanley	Animalize, 1984	3:17

Disc 2
No.	Title	Writer(s)	Original album	Length
1.	"Tears Are Falling"	Stanley	Asylum, 1985	3:52
2.	"Reason to Live"	Child, Stanley	Crazy Nights, 1987	3:59
3.	"Let’s Put the X in Sex"	Child, Stanley	Smashes, Thrashes & Hits, 1988	3:48
4.	"Forever" (Remix)	Michael Bolton, Stanley	Hot in the Shade, 1989	3:51
5.	"God Gave Rock 'N' Roll to You II"	Ezrin, Simmons, Stanley, Ballard	Revenge, 1992	5:20
6.	"Unholy" (live in 1992)	Simmons, Vincent	Alive III, 1993	3:31
7.	"Do You Love Me?" (live unplugged 1995)	Stanley, Ezrin, Kim Fowley	Kiss Unplugged, 1996	3:15
8.	"Room Service" (live in 1975)	Stanley	You Wanted the Best, You Got the Best!!, 1996	3:37
9.	"Jungle" (radio edit)	Stanley, Bruce Kulick, Curtis Cuomo	Carnival of Souls: The Final Sessions, 1997	4:53
10.	"Psycho Circus"	Stanley, Cuomo	Psycho Circus, 1998	4:50
11.	"Nothing Can Keep Me from You"	Diane Warren	Detroit Rock City soundtrack, 1999	4:04
12.	"Detroit Rock City" (live in 2003)	Stanley, Ezrin	Kiss Symphony: Alive IV, 2003	4:43
13.	"Deuce" (live in 2004)	Simmons	Kiss Instant Live, 2004	3:51
14.	"Firehouse" (live in 1999)	Stanley	Alive! The Millennium Concert, 2006	3:52
15.	"Modern Day Delilah"	Stanley	Sonic Boom, 2009	3:36
16.	"Cold Gin" (live in 2008)	Ace Frehley	Kiss Alive 35, 2008	5:30
17.	"Crazy Crazy Nights" (live in 2010)	Adam Mitchell, Stanley	Kiss Sonic Boom Over Europe, 2010	4:08
18.	"Hell or Hallelujah"	Stanley	Monster, 2012	4:07

Japanese Bonus Track
No.	Title	Writer(s)	Original album	Length
19.	"Hell or Hallelujah" (live in 2013)	Stanley	previously unreleased, 2014; originally from Monster, 2012	5:07

== Charts ==
Chart (2014)	Peak position
Australian Albums (ARIA)	31
Belgian Albums (Ultratop Flanders)	87
Belgian Albums (Ultratop Wallonia)	161
Japanese Albums (Oricon)	45
Scottish Albums (Official Charts)	86
Spanish Albums (Promusicae)	55
Swiss Albums (Schweizer Hitparade)	53
US Billboard 200	30
US Top Hard Rock Albums (Billboard)	1
US Top Rock Albums (Billboard)	8

== Certifications ==
Region	Certification	Certified units/sales
United Kingdom (BPI)	Silver	60,000^{‡}
^{‡} Sales+streaming figures based on certification alone.

== Personnel ==
- Paul Stanley – rhythm guitar (disc 1, tracks 1–5, 7–11, 15–22; disc 2), lead vocals (disc 1, tracks 3, 5, 10–11, 15–17, 20–22; disc 2, tracks 1–5, 7–12, 14, 16–18), acoustic guitar (disc 2, track 7)
- Ace Frehley – lead guitar (disc 1, tracks 1–5, 7–11, 14, 16–18; disc 2, tracks 10–11, 14), lead vocals (disc 1, track 14), acoustic guitar (disc 1, track 18)
- Gene Simmons – bass guitar (disc 1, tracks 1–5, 7–11, 13, 16–22; disc 2), lead vocals (disc 1, tracks 1–2, 4, 8–10, 13, 18–19; disc 2, tracks 5–6, 13, 15), acoustic bass (disc 2, track 7)
- Peter Criss – drums (disc 1, tracks 1–5, 7–12, 16–17; disc 2, tracks 11–12, 15), lead vocals (disc 1, tracks 6–7, 12), (for disc 1 tracks 16-17 credit only)
- Eric Carr – drums, vocals (disc 1, tracks 18–22; disc 2, tracks 1–4)
- Vinnie Vincent – lead guitar, vocals (disc 1, track 19, 21)
- Mark St. John – lead guitar (disc 1, track 22)
- Bruce Kulick – lead guitar, backing vocals, (disc 2, tracks 1–6, 8–9), acoustic guitar (disc 2, track 7)
- Eric Singer – drums, backing vocals (disc 2, tracks 5–9, 13, 15–19)
- Tommy Thayer – lead guitar, backing vocals (disc 2, tracks 10, 12–13, 15–19)

with

- Bob Kulick – lead guitar (disc 1, track 20)
- Bob Ezrin – piano (disc 1, track 6)
- Dick Wagner – acoustic guitar (disc 1, track 6)
- Kevin Valentine – drums (disc 2, track 10)
- Tobias Nievelstein – recording engineer (disc 2, tracks 16–17)
- Anton Fig – drums (disc 1, tracks 16–17)
