= Kissology Volume Three: 1992–2000 =

Kissology Vol. III: 1992–2000

Video by Kiss
- Released: December 18, 2007
- Recorded: 1992–2000
- Genre: Hard rock
- Label: VH1 Classic Records
- Producers: Alex Coletti; Roger Coletti

Kiss chronology
Kissology Volume Two: 1978–1991 (2007)	Kissology Vol. III: 1992–2000 (2007)	Kiss Rocks Vegas (2016)

Kissology Volume Three: 1992–2000 is a DVD/Home Video released by Kiss and VH1 Classic Records. It was issued on December 18, 2007. Kissology Volume Three is the third installment of the Kiss archival video series. The set covers the band's 1990s career on three discs, with a special fourth disc included that contains the earliest known performance footage of Kiss, filmed on December 22, 1973. The set also features four separate bonus discs sold only within initial first pressings. It was certified eight times platinum by the RIAA.

== Track listing ==
=== Disc 1 ===
The Palace of Auburn Hills: Detroit, MI November 27, 1992
No.	Title	Length
1.	"Creatures of the Night"
2.	"Deuce"
3.	"I Just Wanna"
4.	"Unholy"
5.	"Parasite"
6.	"Heaven's on Fire"
7.	"Domino"
8.	"Watchin' You"
9.	"War Machine"
10.	"Rock and Roll All Nite"
11.	"Lick It Up"
12.	"Take It Off"
13.	"I Love It Loud"
14.	"Detroit Rock City"
15.	"God Gave Rock and Roll to You II"
16.	"Love Gun"
17.	"The Star-Spangled Banner"

MTV Unplugged: August 9, 1995
No.	Title	Length
18.	"Behind the Scenes"
19.	"Comin' Home"
20.	"Plaster Caster"
21.	"Goin' Blind"
22.	"Do You Love Me?"
23.	"Domino"
24.	"Got To Choose"
25.	"Sure Know Something"
26.	"A World Without Heroes"
27.	"Hard Luck Woman" (previously unreleased)
28.	"Rock Bottom"
29.	"See You Tonight"
30.	"I Still Love You"
31.	"Every Time I Look at You"
32.	"Heaven's on Fire" (previously unreleased)
33.	"Spit" (previously unreleased)
34.	"C'Mon and Love Me" (previously unreleased)
35.	"God of Thunder" (previously unreleased)
36.	"2,000 Man"
37.	"Beth"
38.	"Nothin' To Lose"
39.	"Rock and Roll All Nite"

=== Disc 2 ===
Tiger Stadium: Detroit, MI June 28, 1996
No.	Title	Length
1.	"Deuce"
2.	"King of the Night Time World"
3.	"Do You Love Me?"
4.	"Calling Dr. Love"
5.	"Cold Gin"
6.	"Christine Sixteen"
7.	"Love Gun"
8.	"Shout It Out Loud"
9.	"Watchin' You"
10.	"Firehouse"
11.	"Strutter"
12.	"Shock Me"
13.	"Rock Bottom"
14.	"God of Thunder"
15.	"Let Me Go, Rock 'n' Roll"
16.	"100,000 Years"
17.	"Rock and Roll All Nite"

1996 MTV Video Music Awards: Brooklyn Bridge, NY September 4, 1996
No.	Title	Length
18.	"Rock and Roll All Nite"
19.	"New York Groove"
20.	"Deuce"
21.	"Calling Dr. Love"
22.	"Love Gun"

Dodger Stadium: Los Angeles, CA October 31, 1998 Part 1
No.	Title	Length
23.	"Psycho Circus"
24.	"Shout It Out Loud"
25.	"Let Me Go, Rock 'n' Roll"
26.	"Shock Me"
27.	"Do You Love Me?"
28.	"Calling Dr. Love"
29.	"Firehouse"
30.	"Cold Gin"
31.	"Nothin' To Lose"
32.	"She"
33.	"I Was Made for Lovin' You"

=== Disc 3 ===
Dodger Stadium - Los Angeles, CA Part 2
No.	Title	Length
1.	"Into the Void"
2.	"Love Gun"
3.	"Within"
4.	"100,000 Years"
5.	"King of the Night Time World"
6.	"God of Thunder"
7.	"Deuce"
8.	"Detroit Rock City"
9.	"Beth"
10.	"Black Diamond"
11.	"Rock and Roll All Nite"

Detroit Rock City Movie Premiere Party: Los Angeles, CA August 8, 1999
No.	Title	Length
12.	"Detroit Rock City"
13.	"Shout It Out Loud"
14.	"Cold Gin"
15.	"Rock and Roll All Nite"

"Last KISS" Pay-Per-View Event: Continental Airlines Arena, East Rutherford, New Jersey June 27, 2000
No.	Title	Length
16.	"Detroit Rock City"
17.	"Deuce"
18.	"Shout It Out Loud"
19.	"Firehouse"
20.	"Heaven's on Fire"
21.	"Let Me Go, Rock 'n' Roll"
22.	"Shock Me"
23.	"Psycho Circus"
24.	"God of Thunder"
25.	"100,000 Years"
26.	"Love Gun"
27.	"I Still Love You"/"Black Diamond"
28.	"Beth"
29.	"Rock and Roll All Nite"

=== Disc 4 ===
Coventry - Queens, NY December 22, 1973
No.	Title	Length
1.	"Deuce"
2.	"Cold Gin"
3.	"Nothin' To Lose"
4.	"Strutter"
5.	"Firehouse"
6.	"Let Me Know"
7.	"100,000 Years"
8.	"Black Diamond"
9.	"Let Me Go, Rock 'n' Roll"

=== Bonus Disc 1 - General Release ===
KROQ Weenie Roast: Irvine Meadows, CA June 15, 1996
No.	Title	Length
0.	"Reunion Tour Opener"	58
1.	"Deuce"
2.	"Love Gun"
3.	"Cold Gin"
4.	"Calling Dr. Love"
5.	"Firehouse"
6.	"Shock Me" (with Ace Frehley guitar solo)
7.	"100,000 Years" (preceded by Gene Simmons bass solo)
8.	"Detroit Rock City"
9.	"Black Diamond"
10.	"Rock and Roll All Nite"
Total length:		58 min

=== Bonus Disc 2 - Best Buy Exclusive ===
"Pacaembú Stadium", São Paulo, Brazil August 27, 1994 (Revenge/Alive III tour with Sphinx stage)
No.	Title	Length
1.	"Creatures of the Night"	5:23
2.	"Deuce"	4:02
3.	"Parasite"	3:30
4.	"Unholy"	4:07
5.	"I Stole Your Love"	3:48
6.	"Cold Gin"	5:32
7.	"Watchin' You"	3:56
8.	"Firehouse"	4:53
9.	"Got To Choose"	3:48
10.	"Calling Dr. Love"	3:03
11.	"Makin' Love"	3:19
12.	"War Machine"	4:17
13.	"I Was Made for Lovin' You"	4:44
14.	"Domino"	4:05
15.	"Love Gun"	4:41
16.	"Lick It Up"	4:19
17.	"God of Thunder"	3:59
18.	"I Love It Loud"	3:14
19.	"Detroit Rock City"	6:07
20.	"Black Diamond"	8:01
21.	"Heaven's on Fire"	5:31
Total length:		1 hr 43 min

=== Bonus Disc 3 - Wal-Mart Exclusive ===
Madison Square Garden: New York City, NY July 27, 1996 (Reunion Tour)
No.	Title	Length
1.	"Deuce"
2.	"Calling Dr. Love"
3.	"Cold Gin"
4.	"Let Me Go, Rock 'n' Roll"
5.	"Shout It Out Loud"
6.	"Watchin' You"
7.	"Firehouse"
8.	"Shock Me" (with Ace Frehley guitar solo)
9.	"Strutter"
10.	"Rock Bottom"
11.	"God of Thunder" (with Peter Criss drum solo)
12.	"Love Gun"
13.	"100,000 Years"
14.	"Black Diamond"
15.	"Detroit Rock City"
16.	"Rock and Roll All Nite"
Total length:		1 hr 42 min

=== Bonus Disc 4 - VH1 Pre-order Exclusive ===
Detroit Rock City, 1999
No.	Title	Length
1.	"This bonus disc was only available to those who pre-ordered the DVD set during VH1 Classic's 24 Hours of KISSmas marathon, which aired on December 7 and 8, 2007"
Total length:		1 hr 35 min

== Easter eggs in all versions ==
DVD 1: Carnival Of Souls Studio Sessions Video Montage
No.	Title	Length

DVD 2: MTV Video Music Awards Soundcheck Footage
No.	Title	Length

DVD 3: Kiss Performing “2,000 Man” Live at Midnight During the Millennium Concert
No.	Title	Length

DVD 3: Peter Criss Destroying Drum Kit (After Credits)
No.	Title	Length

== Certifications ==
Region	Certification	Certified units/sales
United States (RIAA)	8× Platinum	200,000^{^}
^{^} Shipments figures based on certification alone.

== Sources ==
Sharp, Ken (Goldmine) - New Kiss DVDs boldly breach the band's vaults
http://www.goldminemag.com/Default.aspx?tabid=825&articleid=7615&articlemid=4972
Gullic, Ken (via Kissonline) - Kissology 2 Award & Vol. 3 Sneak Peek!
http://www.kissonline.com/news/index.php?mode=fullstory&id=4565
Kulick, Bruce - 9-24-07 "Message"
http://www.kulick.net/message/archive07.shtml
