= Kiss Rocks Vegas =

2016 live album by Kiss

Live album by Kiss
- Released: August 26, 2016
- Recorded: November 5–23, 2014
- Venue: The Joint (Las Vegas)
- Genres: Hard rock, heavy metal
- Label: Eagle Rock Entertainment
- Producer: Tommy Thayer

Kiss chronology
Kiss 40 (2014)	Kiss Rocks Vegas (2016)	Kissworld (2017)

Kiss Rocks Vegas

Video by Kiss
- Released: August 26, 2016
- Recorded: November 5–23, 2014
- Length: 113:47
- Label: Eagle Rock Entertainment
- Director: Devin Dehaven
- Producer: Tommy Thayer

Kiss video chronology
Kissology Volume Three: 1992–2000 (2007)	Kiss Rocks Vegas (2016)

Kiss Rocks Vegas is the seventh live album and DVD/Blu-ray Disc by the American hard rock band Kiss released on August 26, 2016. The album was recorded from November 5–23, 2014 during the band's residency at the Hard Rock Hotel and Casino in Las Vegas, Nevada, during their 40th-anniversary tour.

Kiss Rocks Vegas was released in cinemas worldwide on May 25, 2016, and was later released on pay-per-view on June 14, 2016.

== Track listing ==
Live Album
No.	Title	Writer(s)	Lead Vocals	Length
1.	"Detroit Rock City"	Paul Stanley, Bob Ezrin	Paul Stanley	5:16
2.	"Creatures of the Night"	Stanley, Adam Mitchell	Stanley	4:21
3.	"Psycho Circus"	Stanley, Curtis Cuomo	Stanley	5:38
4.	"Parasite"	Ace Frehley	Gene Simmons	3:32
5.	"War Machine"	Simmons, Adams, Jim Vallance	Simmons	4:44
6.	"Tears Are Falling"	Stanley	Stanley	4:19
7.	"Deuce"	Gene Simmons	Simmons	3:35
8.	"Lick It Up"	Stanley, Vinnie Vincent	Stanley	6:24
9.	"I Love It Loud"	Simmons, Vincent	Simmons	3:30
10.	"Hell or Hallelujah"	Stanley	Stanley	4:42
11.	"God of Thunder"	Stanley	Simmons	5:09
12.	"Do You Love Me?"	Stanley, Ezrin, Kim Fowley	Stanley	3:57
13.	"Love Gun"	Stanley	Stanley	4:40
14.	"Black Diamond"	Stanley	Eric Singer (intro: Stanley)	9:05
15.	"Shout It Out Loud"	Stanley, Simmons, Ezrin	Stanley, Simmons	2:45
16.	"Rock and Roll All Nite"	Stanley, Simmons	Simmons	7:54

=== DVD/Blu-ray ===
Kiss Rocks Vegas
No.	Title	Length
1.	"Detroit Rock City"
2.	"Creatures of the Night"
3.	"Psycho Circus"
4.	"Parasite"
5.	"War Machine"
6.	"Tears Are Falling"
7.	"Deuce"
8.	"Lick it Up"
9.	"I Love it Loud"
10.	"Hell or Hallelujah"
11.	"God of Thunder"
12.	"Do You Love Me?"
13.	"Love Gun"
14.	"Black Diamond"
15.	"Shout it Out Loud"
16.	"Rock and Roll All Nite"

Kiss Acoustic
No.	Title	Length
1.	"Comin' Home"
2.	"Plaster Caster"
3.	"Hard Luck Woman"
4.	"Christine Sixteen"
5.	"Goin' Blind"
6.	"Love Her All I Can"
7.	"Beth"

== Personnel ==
Kiss

- Paul Stanley – vocals, rhythm guitar
- Gene Simmons – vocals, bass
- Eric Singer – drums, percussion, vocals
- Tommy Thayer – lead guitar, backing vocals

Additional personnel

- Francis Stueber – introduction voice

== Charts ==
Chart (2016)	Peak position
Australian Music DVD (Aria Top 40)	1
Austrian Albums (Ö3 Austria)	55
Austrian Music DVD	2
Belgian Albums (Ultratop Flanders)	178
Belgian Music DVD (Ultratop Flanders)	1
Dutch Music DVD (Dutch Charts)	1
Finnish Music DVD (Finland Charts)	1
France Music DVD	2
German Albums (Offizielle Top 100)	24
German Music DVD (German Charts)	1
Spain Music DVD	1
Sweden Hard Rock Album Charts	12
Sweden Music DVD Charts	1
Swiss Albums (Schweizer Hitparade)	58
Swiss Music DVD	1
UK Official Top 50 DVD (British Charts)	1
US Billboard Music DVD Chart	1
