= Kissology =

Kissology is a compilation of home video and DVD releases featuring interviews, live performances, music videos, and television appearances by the American rock band Kiss.

- Kissology Volume One: 1974–1977
- Kissology Volume Two: 1978–1991
- Kissology Volume Three: 1992–2000

Kissology may also refer to Jigoku-Retsuden, an album also referred to by this title.
