= Greatest Kiss =

Greatest hits album by Kiss
- Released: April 8, 1997
- Recorded: 1973–1996
- Genres: Hard rock; heavy metal
- Length: 56:04
- Label: Mercury
- Producer: Various

Kiss chronology
You Wanted the Best, You Got the Best!! (1996)	Greatest Kiss (1997)	Carnival of Souls: The Final Sessions (1997)

Professional ratings
Review scores
Source	Rating
AllMusic	3/5 stars
Encyclopedia of Popular Music	3/5 stars
The Rolling Stone Album Guide	3.5/5 stars

Greatest Kiss is a greatest hits album by American hard rock band Kiss. It was released in 1997 on Mercury Records.

== Background ==
Along with You Wanted the Best, You Got the Best!!, this album was issued to coincide with the group's 1996–97 Alive/Worldwide Tour. The US version covers only selected hits from 1974 to 1980, with an exclusive live version of "Shout It Out Loud"; the non-US releases include the band's 1992 hit "God Gave Rock 'n' Roll to You II."

== Track listings ==
US version
No.	Title	Writer(s)	Lead vocals	Length
1.	"Detroit Rock City"	Paul Stanley, Bob Ezrin	Stanley	3:38
2.	"Hard Luck Woman"	Stanley	Peter Criss	3:35
3.	"Sure Know Something"	Stanley, Vini Poncia	Stanley	4:02
4.	"Deuce"	Gene Simmons	Simmons	3:42
5.	"Do You Love Me?"	Stanley, Ezrin, Kim Fowley	Stanley	3:34
6.	"I Was Made for Lovin' You"	Stanley, Desmond Child, Poncia	Stanley	4:30
7.	"Calling Dr. Love"	Simmons	Simmons	3:46
8.	"Christine Sixteen"	Simmons	Simmons	3:12
9.	"Beth"	Criss, Ezrin, Stan Penridge	Criss	2:46
10.	"Strutter"	Simmons, Stanley	Stanley	3:12
11.	"Cold Gin"	Ace Frehley	Simmons	4:22
12.	"Plaster Caster"	Simmons	Simmons	3:27
13.	"Rock and Roll All Nite"	Stanley, Simmons	Simmons	2:53
14.	"Flaming Youth"	Ezrin, Frehley, Simmons, Stanley	Stanley	3:00
15.	"Two Sides of the Coin"	Frehley	Frehley	3:15
16.	"Shout It Out Loud" (recorded live at Tiger Stadium, Detroit, MI, on June 28, 1996)	Stanley, Simmons, Ezrin	Stanley, Simmons	3:39

- Produced by Kiss and Eddie Kramer

European and Australian version
No.	Title	Writer(s)	Lead vocals	Length
1.	"Detroit Rock City"	Stanley, Ezrin	Stanley	3:38
2.	"Black Diamond"	Stanley	Criss	5:14
3.	"Hard Luck Woman"	Stanley	Criss	3:35
4.	"Sure Know Something"	Stanley, Poncia	Stanley	4:02
5.	"Love Gun"	Stanley	Stanley	3:16
6.	"Deuce"	Simmons	Simmons	3:42
7.	"Goin' Blind"	Simmons, Stephen Coronel	Simmons	3:36
8.	"Shock Me"	Frehley	Frehley	3:47
9.	"Do You Love Me?"	Stanley, Ezrin, Fowley	Stanley	3:34
10.	"She"	Simmons, Coronel	Simmons	4:08
11.	"I Was Made for Lovin' You"	Stanley, Child, Poncia	Stanley	4:30
12.	"Shout It Out Loud" (recorded live at Tiger Stadium, Detroit, MI, on June 28, 1996)	Stanley, Simmons, Ezrin	Stanley, Simmons	3:39
13.	"God of Thunder"	Stanley	Simmons	4:15
14.	"Calling Dr. Love"	Simmons	Simmons	3:46
15.	"Beth"	Criss, Ezrin, Penridge	Criss	2:46
16.	"Strutter"	Simmons, Stanley	Stanley	3:12
17.	"Rock and Roll All Nite"	Stanley, Simmons	Simmons	2:53
18.	"Cold Gin"	Frehley	Simmons	4:22
19.	"Plaster Caster"	Simmons	Simmons	3:27
20.	"God Gave Rock 'n' Roll to You II"	Russ Ballard, Stanley, Simmons, Ezrin	Stanley, Simmons	5:20

Japanese version
No.	Title	Writer(s)	Lead vocals	Length
1.	"Detroit Rock City"	Stanley, Ezrin	Stanley	3:38
2.	"Black Diamond"	Stanley	Criss	5:14
3.	"Hard Luck Woman"	Stanley	Criss	3:35
4.	"Sure Know Something"	Stanley, Poncia	Stanley	4:02
5.	"Love Gun"	Stanley	Stanley	3:16
6.	"Deuce"	Simmons	Simmons	3:42
7.	"Goin' Blind"	Simmons, Coronel	Simmons	3:36
8.	"Shock Me"	Frehley	Frehley	3:47
9.	"Do You Love Me?"	Stanley, Ezrin, Fowley	Stanley	3:34
10.	"She"	Simmons, Coronel	Simmons	4:08
11.	"I Was Made for Lovin' You"	Stanley, Child, Poncia	Stanley	4:30
12.	"Shout It Out Loud" (recorded live at Tiger Stadium, Detroit, MI, on June 28, 1996)	Stanley, Simmons, Ezrin	Stanley, Simmons	3:39
13.	"God of Thunder"	Stanley	Simmons	4:15
14.	"Calling Dr. Love"	Simmons	Simmons	3:46
15.	"Beth"	Criss, Ezrin, Penridge	Criss	2:46
16.	"Strutter"	Simmons, Stanley	Stanley	3:12
17.	"Rock and Roll All Nite"	Stanley, Simmons	Simmons	2:53
18.	"C'mon and Love Me"	Stanley	Stanley	2:59
19.	"Rock Bottom"	Stanley, Frehley	Stanley	3:55
20.	"God Gave Rock 'n' Roll to You II"	Ballard, Stanley, Simmons, Ezrin	Stanley, Simmons	5:20

Mexican version
No.	Title	Writer(s)	Lead vocals	Length
1.	"Detroit Rock City"	Stanley, Ezrin	Stanley	3:38
2.	"Black Diamond"	Stanley	Criss	5:14
3.	"Hard Luck Woman"	Stanley	Criss	3:35
4.	"Sure Know Something"	Stanley, Poncia	Stanley	4:02
5.	"Love Gun"	Stanley	Stanley	3:16
6.	"Deuce"	Simmons	Simmons	3:42
7.	"Goin' Blind"	Simmons, Coronel	Simmons	3:36
8.	"2000 Man" (The Rolling Stones cover)	Mick Jagger, Keith Richards	Frehley	4:53
9.	"Do You Love Me?"	Stanley, Ezrin, Fowley	Stanley	3:34
10.	"She"	Simmons, Coronel	Simmons	4:08
11.	"I Was Made for Lovin' You"	Stanley, Child, Poncia	Stanley	4:30
12.	"Shout It Out Loud" (recorded live at Tiger Stadium, Detroit, MI, on June 28, 1996)	Stanley, Simmons, Ezrin	Stanley, Simmons	3:39
13.	"God of Thunder"	Stanley	Simmons	4:15
14.	"Calling Dr. Love"	Simmons	Simmons	3:46
15.	"Beth"	Criss, Ezrin, Penridge	Criss	2:46
16.	"Strutter"	Simmons, Stanley	Stanley	3:12
17.	"Rock and Roll All Nite"	Stanley, Simmons	Simmons	2:53
18.	"I Want You"	Stanley	Stanley	3:02
19.	"Plaster Caster"	Simmons	Simmons	3:27
20.	"God Gave Rock 'n' Roll to You II"	Ballard, Stanley, Simmons, Ezrin	Stanley, Simmons	5:20

- Note: The Mexican release has the European track listing misprinted on the packaging.

== Personnel ==
Kiss

- Paul Stanley – vocals, rhythm guitar, lead guitar on "Sure Know Something", intro guitar solo on "C'mon and Love Me", first guitar solo on "I Want You", 12-string acoustic guitar on "Hard Luck Woman", bass on "Love Gun" and "I Was Made for Lovin' You"
- Gene Simmons – vocals, bass; rhythm guitar on "Christine Sixteen"
- Peter Criss – drums, vocals
- Ace Frehley – lead guitar, second guitar solo on "I Want You", acoustic guitar on "Hard Luck Woman"; vocals, all guitars and bass on "Two Sides of the Coin", "Shock Me" and "2,000 Man"
- Bruce Kulick – lead guitar on "God Gave Rock 'n' Roll to You II"
- Eric Singer – drums on "God Gave Rock 'n' Roll to You II"
- Eric Carr – backing vocals on "God Gave Rock 'n' Roll to You II"

Additional musicians

- Anton Fig – drums on "Sure Know Something", "2,000 Man", "I Was Made for Lovin' You" and "Two Sides of the Coin"
- Dick Wagner – acoustic guitar on "Beth"
- Bob Ezrin – piano on "Beth"

== Production ==
- Spiro Papadatos - album cover design

== Charts ==
Chart (1996–1997)	Peak position
Australian Albums (ARIA)	11
Austrian Albums (Ö3 Austria)	40
Dutch Albums (Album Top 100)	92
Finnish Albums (Suomen virallinen lista)	13
German Albums (Offizielle Top 100)	64
Japanese Albums (Oricon)	25
New Zealand Albums (RMNZ)	25
Norwegian Albums (VG-lista)	25
Scottish Albums (Official Charts)	91
Swedish Albums (Sverigetopplistan)	3
UK Albums (Official Charts)	58
UK Rock & Metal Albums (Official Charts)	10
US Billboard 200	77

== Certifications ==
Region	Certification	Certified units/sales
Argentina (CAPIF)	Platinum	60,000^{^}
Australia (ARIA)	Gold	35,000^{^}
Sweden (GLF)	Gold	40,000^{^}
^{^} Shipments figures based on certification alone.
