= Kissology Volume Two: 1978–1991 =

Live album by Kiss

Video by Kiss
- Released: August 14, 2007
- Recorded: 1978–1991
- Genre: Hard rock
- Label: VH1 Classic
- Producers: Alex Coletti; Roger Coletti

Kiss chronology
Kissology Volume One: 1974–1977 (2006)	Kissology Volume Two: 1978–1991 (2007)	Kissology Volume Three: 1992–2000 (2007)

Professional ratings
Review scores
Source	Rating
AllMusic	4/5 stars
Classic Rock	8/10 stars
Record Collector	3/5 stars

Kissology Volume Two: 1978–1991 is a DVD/Home Video that was released by Kiss on August 14, 2007. It contains three discs, plus one of three separate bonus discs sold only within initial first pressings. Some initial packages included a replica ticket to Magic Mountain for Kiss Meets the Phantom of the Park. The box set was certified six times Platinum. This set was preceded by Kissology Vol. 1, and is followed by Kissology Vol. 3, which was released in early December 2007.

The bonus discs contain:

- The Largo, MD show from the Dynasty Tour (sold only at Wal-Mart, Sam's Club and Amazon)
- The New York Ritz Club show from the Crazy Nights World Tour (sold only at Best Buy)
- The Tokyo show from the Crazy Nights World Tour (sold at all other retailers)

== Track listings ==
=== Disc 1 ===
Land of Hype and Glory with Edwin Newman – January 10, 1978
No.	Title	Length

Kiss in Attack of the Phantoms, European Theatrical Cut – 1979
No.	Title	Length

The Tomorrow Show with Tom Snyder (partial) – October 31, 1979
No.	Title	Length

=== Disc 2 ===
Shandi (music video) – 1980
No.	Title	Length

CNN Interview With Peter Criss – September 24, 1980
No.	Title	Length

Countdown – September 21, 1980
No.	Title	Length

Rockpop – September 13, 1980
No.	Title	Length
1.	"She’s So European"
2.	"Talk to Me"

KISS Invades Australia – Sydney Showground: Sydney, Australia – November 22, 1980, Unmasked Tour
No.	Title	Length
3.	"Detroit Rock City"
4.	"Cold Gin"
5.	"Strutter"
6.	"Shandi"
7.	"Calling Dr. Love"
8.	"Firehouse"
9.	"Talk to Me"
10.	"Is That You?"
11.	"2,000 Man"
12.	"I Was Made for Lovin' You"
13.	"New York Groove"
14.	"Love Gun"
15.	"Drum Solo"/"God of Thunder" (incomplete)
16.	"Rock and Roll All Nite"
17.	"Shout It Out Loud"
18.	"King of the Night Time World"
19.	"Paul Stanley's Solo" + "Black Diamond"

Fridays – January 15, 1982
No.	Title	Length
20.	"The Oath"
21.	"A World Without Heroes"
22.	"I"

Top Pop – November 1982
No.	Title	Length
23.	"I Love It Loud"

=== Disc 3 ===
Creatures of the Night Tour In Maracanã Stadium: Rio de Janeiro, Brazil – June 18, 1983
No.	Title	Length
1.	"Creatures of the Night"
2.	"Cold Gin"
3.	"Calling Dr. Love"
4.	"Firehouse"
5.	"I Love It Loud"
6.	"War Machine"
7.	"Black Diamond" (incomplete)

MTV Special: KISS Unmasking – September 18, 1983
No.	Title	Length

Lick It Up Tour At Cascais Hall: Lisbon, Portugal – October 11, 1983
No.	Title	Length
8.	"Creatures of the Night"
9.	"Detroit Rock City"

Crazy Nights Tour At The Spectrum: Philadelphia, PA – December 18, 1987
No.	Title	Length
10.	"Love Gun"
11.	"Bang Bang You"
12.	"Reason To Live"
13.	"No, No, No"
14.	"Crazy, Crazy Nights"

Hot in the Shade Tour At The Palace at Auburn Hills: Detroit, MI – October 14, 1990
No.	Title	Length
15.	"I Stole Your Love"
16.	"Deuce"
17.	"Heaven’s on Fire"
18.	"Crazy Crazy Nights"
19.	"Black Diamond"
20.	"Shout It Out Loud"
21.	"Strutter"
22.	"Calling Dr. Love"
23.	"I Was Made for Lovin' You"
24.	"Fits Like a Glove"
25.	"Hide Your Heart"
26.	"Lick It Up"
27.	"God of Thunder"
28.	"Forever"
29.	"Cold Gin"
30.	"Tears Are Falling"
31.	"I Love It Loud"
32.	"Love Gun"
33.	"Detroit Rock City"
34.	"I Want You"
35.	"Rock and Roll All Nite"

MTV News excerpt, Day in Rock – November 25, 1991
No.	Title	Length

Music Video – 1991
No.	Title	Length
36.	"God Gave Rock ‘n’ Roll to You II"

Bonus After the Credits
No.	Title	Length
37.	"Eric Carr in the hospital"

Easter Egg On the Menu if You Click on the "KISSology": Gene Simmons & Mark St. John Interview
No.	Title	Length

=== Bonus Disc 1 ===
(Only at Other Retail)

Crazy Nights Tour Nippon Budokan Tokyo, Japan – April 21, 1988
No.	Title	Length
1.	"Love Gun"
2.	"Cold Gin"
3.	"Crazy Crazy Nights"
4.	"Heaven's on Fire"
5.	"War Machine"
6.	"I Love It Loud"
7.	"Lick It Up"
8.	"I Was Made for Lovin' You"
9.	"Detroit Rock City"

=== Bonus disc 2 ===
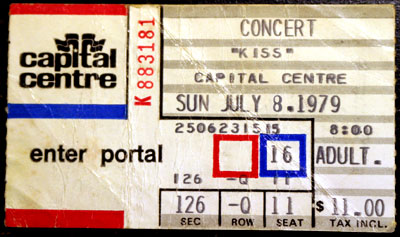
Ticket from July 8, 1979 concert

(Only at Walmart, Sam's Club and Amazon)

Dynasty Tour At Capital Centre, Largo, MD – July 8, 1979
No.	Title	Length
1.	"Radioactive"
2.	"Move On"
3.	"Calling Dr. Love"
4.	"Firehouse"
5.	"New York Groove"
6.	"I Was Made for Lovin' You"
7.	"Love Gun"
8.	"Tossin' and Turnin'"
9.	"God of Thunder"
10.	"Shout It Out Loud"
11.	"Black Diamond"
12.	"Detroit Rock City"
13.	"Rock and Roll All Nite"

=== Bonus disc 3 ===
(Only at Best Buy)

Crazy Nights Tour At The Ritz New York, NY – August 13, 1988
No.	Title	Length
1.	"Deuce"
2.	"Love Gun"
3.	"Fits Like a Glove"
4.	"Heaven's on Fire"
5.	"Cold Gin"
6.	"Black Diamond"
7.	"Firehouse"
8.	"Crazy, Crazy Nights"
9.	"Calling Dr. Love"
10.	"War Machine"
11.	"Tears Are Falling"

== Certifications ==
Region	Certification	Certified units/sales
United States (RIAA)	6× Platinum	199,998^{^}
^{^} Shipments figures based on certification alone.
