= Spin the Bottle: An All-Star Tribute to Kiss =

Compilation album by Various Artists
- Released: April 27, 2004
- Genre: Hard rock, heavy metal
- Length: 42:45
- Label: Koch
- Producer: Bob Kulick, Bruce Bouillet

Professional ratings
Review scores
Source	Rating
AllMusic	3/5 stars

Spin the Bottle: An All-Star Tribute to Kiss is a 2004 tribute album, featuring a variety of artists covering songs by the American rock band Kiss.

The album cover features Kira Eggers.

== Track listing ==
No.	Title	Writer(s)	Artist	Length
1.	"Detroit Rock City"	Stanley/Ezrin	Dee Snider	4:31
2.	"Love Gun"	Stanley	Tommy Shaw	3:58
3.	"Cold Gin"	Frehley	Mark Slaughter	4:44
4.	"King of the Night Time World"	Stanley/Ezrin/Fowley/Anthony	Fozzy	3:04
5.	"I Want You"	Stanley	Kip Winger	3:46
6.	"God of Thunder"	Stanley	Buzz Osborne	4:11
7.	"Calling Dr. Love"	Simmons	Page Hamilton	3:30
8.	"Shout It Out Loud"	Stanley/Simmons/Ezrin	Lemmy Kilmister (bass, vocals), Jennifer Batten (lead guitar), Samantha Maloney (drums)	3:56
9.	"Parasite"	Frehley	Doug Pinnick	4:07
10.	"Strutter"	Stanley/Simmons	Phil Lewis	3:38
11.	"I Stole Your Love"	Stanley	Robin McAuley	3:20
