= Rocket Ride (song) =

Single by Kiss

from the album Alive II
- B-side: "Tomorrow and Tonight"
- Released: February 22, 1978
- Recorded: September 13–16,1977
- Studio: Electric Lady, New York City
- Genre: Hard rock; heavy metal
- Length: 4:08
- Label: Casablanca
- Songwriters: Ace Frehley, Sean Delaney
- Producers: Eddie Kramer & Kiss

Kiss singles chronology
"Shout It Out Loud (Live)" (1977)	"Rocket Ride" (1978)	"Strutter '78" (1978)

"Rocket Ride" is a song by American rock band Kiss, released in 1978 as the second and final single from their second live album Alive II. The song, one of five studio tracks on the album, was written by Sean Delaney and guitarist Ace Frehley, who sang lead vocals. It was his second vocal performance for the band, and another hit for them on the US Billboard Hot 100, reaching No. 39.

== Background and recording ==
"Rocket Ride" was written by Sean Delaney and guitarist Ace Frehley, who sang lead vocals. Frehley noted in the booklet for the 2001 Kiss Box Set that this was his first vocal performance he was satisfied with. The song was written for Frehley's eponymous solo album, but he submitted it for Alive II instead, the only studio track of the five recorded for the album that he performed on, as Bob Kulick was brought in to play guitar on some of the other tracks.

It's unknown where "Rocket Ride" was written. Frehley has stated that it was written at his home in the New York area, while Delaney said it was written in Japan, where the band was experiencing writer's block. Delaney, who came up with the lyrics and melody, asked if Frehley had any riffs, to which Frehley replied, "Oh yeah, there's this one, but I don't think the guys in the band are capable of playing it."

== Composition and lyrics ==
"Rocket Ride" is a fast-paced song, described as "hard-rock overdrive" and one of the band's "most metallic moments." Starting with an effects-drenched ascending guitar riff, before Frehley's singing, the song pushes rhythm to the forefront by matching hard-swinging verses with a chorus built on staccato sing-along hooks. Like many of Kiss's works, the song is a double entendre, using space travel (appropriate to Frehley's onstage "Spaceman" persona) as an innuendo for sexual intercourse.

== Reception ==
Cash Box praised the song's "grinding heavy guitar and driving rock beat, flashy solo and competent vocals." AllMusic critic Donald A. Guarisco described the song as a "major cult favorite" and "one of Frehley’s finest achievements as a songwriter and a guitarist." Ultimate Classic Rock critic Matt Wardlaw claimed "Rocket Ride" is more than worthy of its name, and is "built on top of that initial riff, there's driving energy, as Frehley’s guitar tone gives everything an appropriately lunar feel."

Hide recreated the intro of the song for his own 1998 single "Rocket Dive", the title also being an homage to the track. Frehley's 2008 tour, The Rocket Ride Tour (in support of his album Anomaly) was named after the song.

== Appearances ==
"Rocket Ride" has appeared on the following Kiss albums:

- Alive II – studio version
- The Box Set – studio version
- Kiss Alive! 1975–2000 – studio version

== Track listing ==
7" Single
No.	Title	Writer(s)	Length
1.	"Rocket Ride"	Sean Delaney, Ace Frehley	3:04
2.	"Tomorrow and Tonight"	Paul Stanley	3:30
Total length:			6:34

12" Maxi
No.	Title	Writer(s)	Length
1.	"Rocket Ride"	Delaney, Frehley	4:06
2.	"Detroit Rock City"	Stanley, Bob Ezrin	3:45
3.	"Love Gun"	Stanley	3:30
Total length:			11:21

== Personnel ==
- Ace Frehley – vocals, guitars, bass
- Peter Criss – drums

== Charts ==
Chart (1978)	Peak position
Canada Top Singles (RPM)	46
US Billboard Hot 100	39
