= Alive! The Millennium Concert =

Live album by Kiss
- Released: November 21, 2006
- Recorded: December 31, 1999; January 1, 2000
- Venues: BC Place Stadium, Vancouver
- Genre: Hard rock
- Length: 76:54 (Best Buy edition); 81:45 (Vinyl edition)
- Labels: Mercury, Universal
- Producer: Kiss

Kiss chronology
The Best of Kiss, Volume 2: The Millennium Collection (2004)	Alive! The Millennium Concert (2006)	Jigoku-Retsuden (2008)

Alive! The Millennium Concert is the sixth live album by the American hard rock band Kiss. It was released on November 21, 2006, as part of the Kiss Alive! 1975–2000 box set.

== Album information ==
It was recorded on December 31, 1999, at BC Place Stadium in Vancouver, British Columbia and included songs that had never before been performed by the original lineup ("Heaven's on Fire", "I Love It Loud" and "Lick It Up").

It was originally intended to be released as Alive IV in 2000 but was shelved when Kiss' parent label Mercury was swallowed by the Universal/Vivendi merger. However, the album's version of "Rock and Roll All Nite" was included in The Box Set which was released on November 20, 2001. Although Universal later agreed to Kiss using Mercury to release what would become The Millennium Concert as Alive IV, it was shelved indefinitely and the band would release the Symphony: Alive IV album released on Kiss Records/Sanctuary Records in 2003. It was finally released on November 21, 2006, as part of the Kiss Alive! 1975–2000 box set.

An edition of the box set exclusive to Best Buy was advertised as including two exclusive bonus tracks (2,000 Man and God of Thunder) on The Millennium Concert disc. But due to an error, Best Buy only sold the standard box set that did not have the exclusive bonus tracks. In an attempt to correct this, a replacement disc was produced and small quantities were shipped to Best Buy locations where the discs were given out to customers who came back to complain that their box did not include the promised extra tracks.

Another bonus track, "Detroit Rock City", was released as an exclusive to the iTunes edition of the box set.

On October 14, 2014, The Millennium Concert was released on vinyl. This release is the only edition to include all previously released tracks. However, it is still not the entire concert, as "Cold Gin" and "Shock Me" remain unreleased.

== Track listing ==
No.	Title	Writer(s)	Lead Vocals	Length
1.	"Psycho Circus"	Paul Stanley, Curtis Cuomo	Stanley	5:33
2.	"Shout It Out Loud"	Stanley, Gene Simmons, Bob Ezrin	Stanley, Simmons	3:16
3.	"Deuce"	Simmons	Simmons	3:45
4.	"Heaven's on Fire"	Stanley, Desmond Child	Stanley	4:14
5.	"Into the Void"	Ace Frehley, Karl Cochran	Ace Frehley	4:25
6.	"Firehouse"	Stanley	Stanley	3:59
7.	"Do You Love Me?"	Stanley, Ezrin, Kim Fowley	Stanley	3:54
8.	"Let Me Go, Rock 'n' Roll"	Stanley, Simmons	Simmons	5:16
9.	"I Love It Loud"	Simmons, Vinnie Vincent	Simmons	3:24
10.	"Lick It Up"	Stanley, Vincent	Stanley	4:39
11.	"100,000 Years"	Stanley, Simmons	Stanley	5:47
12.	"Love Gun"	Stanley	Stanley	4:17
13.	"Black Diamond"	Stanley	Peter Criss, intro by Stanley	5:28
14.	"Beth"	Criss, Ezrin, Stan Penridge	Criss	2:42
15.	"Rock and Roll All Nite"	Stanley, Simmons	Simmons	5:40

Best Buy Edition
No.	Title	Writer(s)	Lead Vocals	Length
16.	"2,000 Man"	Mick Jagger, Keith Richards	Frehley	5:30
17.	"God of Thunder"	Stanley	Simmons	4:55

iTunes Edition
No.	Title	Writer(s)	Lead vocals	Length
16.	"Detroit Rock City"	Stanley, Ezrin	Stanley	4:58

=== Vinyl Release ===
Side A
No.	Title	Length
1.	"Psycho Circus"
2.	"Shout It Out Loud"
3.	"Deuce"
4.	"Heaven’s on Fire"
5.	"Into the Void"

Side B
No.	Title	Length
6.	"Firehouse"
7.	"Do You Love Me?"
8.	"Let Me Go, Rock 'n' Roll"
9.	"2,000 Man"

Side C
No.	Title	Length
10.	"God of Thunder"
11.	"I Love It Loud"
12.	"Lick It Up"
13.	"100,000 Years"

Side D
No.	Title	Length
14.	"Love Gun"
15.	"Black Diamond"
16.	"Detroit Rock City"
17.	"Beth"
18.	"Rock and Roll All Nite"

== Personnel ==
- Paul Stanley – vocals, rhythm guitar
- Gene Simmons – vocals, bass
- Peter Criss – drums, vocals
- Ace Frehley – lead guitar, vocals

== Charts ==
Chart (2006)	Peak position
US Billboard 200	167
