= Killers (Kiss album) =

Greatest hits album by Kiss
- Released: June 15, 1982
- Recorded: 1973–1982
- Studio: Record Plant, Los Angeles
- Genre: Hard rock
- Length: 46:35
- Label: Casablanca
- Producer: Michael James Jackson (new tracks), Kenny Kerner, Richie Wise, Bob Ezrin, Eddie Kramer, Vini Poncia, Kiss

Kiss chronology
Music from "The Elder" (1981)	Killers (1982)	Creatures of the Night (1982)

Professional ratings
Review scores
Source	Rating
AllMusic	3/5 stars
Collector's Guide to Heavy Metal	5/10
Encyclopedia of Popular Music	3/5 stars

Killers is the second compilation album by American hard rock group Kiss. It was released only outside the United States but quickly became available as an import. Of the album's twelve songs, four were new compositions recorded specifically for it: "I'm a Legend Tonight", "Down on Your Knees", "Nowhere to Run" and "Partners in Crime". These new songs were recorded at the behest of Phonogram, in response to the commercial failure of 1981's Music from "The Elder".

== Album information ==
By 1982 Kiss's commercial popularity was at its nadir. 1980's Unmasked had barely achieved gold certification in the United States, and the band toured exclusively outside the US for the first time in their career that year, aside from one show in New York which introduced Eric Carr as their new official drummer. Music from "The Elder" fared even worse, as it failed to gain any certification, and the band did not tour behind it at all. The album, released in November 1981, was off the charts by February 1982.

Phonogram (the parent company of Kiss's label Casablanca Records) then requested that Kiss record four new songs, to be included on an upcoming greatest hits album. Phonogram requested hard rock songs specifically, in contrast to the progressive rock-style of Music from "The Elder". The album cover featured the streamlined look the band had adopted during the Elder period.

Numerous outside songwriters and session musicians were employed for the writing and recording of the four new songs on Killers, as well as the subsequent album, Creatures of the Night. Songwriter and musician Mikel Japp, who co-wrote three songs on Paul Stanley's 1978 solo album, co-wrote "Down on Your Knees" with Stanley and Bryan Adams. Adam Mitchell, another outside songwriter, was brought in by producer Michael James Jackson.

Despite being pictured on the album's cover art (from the photo session for Music from "The Elder"), lead guitarist and co-founder Ace Frehley did not participate at all in the production of Killers. He had essentially ended his active involvement with Kiss in late 1981, although he would not officially leave the group until the end of 1982, after the release of Creatures of the Night. His replacement for the Killers sessions was Bob Kulick, who had previously substituted for Frehley on a handful of studio tracks on 1977's Alive II; however, whereas Kulick had been asked to mimic Frehley's playing style when recording for Alive II, he was permitted to employ his own techniques for Killers. The four new songs were considered a "primer" for Kiss's next release, while some fans have indicated that fan club memos at the time listed Frehley as "temporarily out of action", possibly due to a car accident or something similar, and originally listed Vinnie Vincent as a temporary replacement for Frehley.

Due to the large volume of Kiss live albums and greatest hits albums already available domestically, Phonogram decided to issue the album outside the US. The album sold in moderate numbers, reaching its highest chart position of No. 6 in Norway. None of the singles released from the album charted in any country. Also, due to the shape of the S in their band logo, there were two covers: one with the standard "S", and a more German friendly version with a "backwards"‑Z shape (in Germany, the Kiss logo is modified due to the standard one resembling the Schutzstaffel insignia).

== Track listing ==
All credits adapted from the original release.

Side one
No.	Title	Writer(s)	Original album	Length
1.	"I'm a Legend Tonight"	Paul Stanley, Adam Mitchell	Previously unreleased	3:59
2.	"Down on Your Knees"	Stanley, Mikel Japp, Bryan Adams	Previously unreleased	3:31
3.	"Cold Gin"	Ace Frehley	Kiss	4:20
4.	"Love Gun"	Stanley	Love Gun	3:17
5.	"Shout It Out Loud" (7" mix)	Stanley, Gene Simmons, Bob Ezrin	Destroyer	2:40
6.	"Sure Know Something"	Stanley, Vini Poncia	Dynasty	3:59

Side two
No.	Title	Writer(s)	Original album	Length
1.	"Nowhere to Run"	Stanley	Previously unreleased	4:32
2.	"Partners in Crime"	Stanley, Mitchell	Previously unreleased	3:45
3.	"Detroit Rock City" (without intro)	Stanley, Ezrin	Destroyer	3:53
4.	"God of Thunder" (without intro)	Stanley	Destroyer	4:11
5.	"I Was Made for Lovin' You" (edited version)	Stanley, Poncia, Desmond Child	Dynasty	4:18
6.	"Rock and Roll All Nite" (Live)	Stanley, Simmons	Alive!	3:58

- The Japanese release featured two additional tracks not found on the standard edition: "Escape from the Island" (which is not on the Japanese release of Music from "The Elder") and "Shandi". Similarly, "Talk to Me" and "Shandi" were added to the track listing of the Australian release.
- The version of "Shout It Out Loud" found on this release features the single mix that has all the vocals in the center channel, whereas the original Destroyer version features Paul Stanley on the right channel, and Gene Simmons on the left. It also fades about ten seconds earlier than the album version.
- The versions of "Detroit Rock City" and "God of Thunder" found on this release are missing their respective intros found on Destroyer.
- The live version of "Rock and Roll All Nite" is the same one found on Alive!

== Personnel ==
=== Kiss ===
- Paul Stanley – vocals, rhythm guitar, lead guitar on "Sure Know Something" & "Shandi", bass on "Down on Your Knees", "Love Gun" & "I Was Made for Lovin' You"
- Gene Simmons – vocals, bass
- Ace Frehley – lead guitar, vocals, acoustic guitar on "Shandi", all guitars and bass on "Talk to Me"
- Eric Carr – drums on "Escape From the Island" and drums and backing vocals on "I'm a Legend Tonight", "Down on Your Knees", "Nowhere to Run", and "Partners in Crime"

=== Additional musicians ===
- Peter Criss – drums and backing vocals on "Cold Gin", "Love Gun", "Shout It Out Loud", "Detroit Rock City", "God of Thunder" & "Rock and Roll All Nite"
- Mikel Japp – rhythm guitar on "Down on Your Knees"
- Bob Kulick – lead guitar on "I'm a Legend Tonight", "Down on Your Knees", "Nowhere to Run" & "Partners in Crime"
- Anton Fig – drums on "Sure Know Something", "I Was Made for Lovin' You", "Shandi" & "Talk to Me"
- Vini Poncia – keyboards on "I Was Made for Lovin' You" & "Talk to Me", backing vocals on "Sure Know Something" and "Shandi"
- Eddie Kramer – keyboards on "Love Gun"
- Bob Ezrin – keyboards on "God of Thunder" & "Escape from the Island", bass on "Escape from the Island"
- David and Josh Ezrin – voices on "God of Thunder"
- Holly Knight – keyboards on "Shandi"
- Tom Harper – bass on "Shandi"

=== Production (new tracks) ===
- Michael James Jackson – producer
- David Thoener – engineer
- Dave Wittman – additional engineering, mixing
- Brian Gardner – mastering at Alan Zentz Mastering, Los Angeles

== Charts ==
Chart (1982)	Peak position
Australian Albums (Kent Music Report)	21
Austrian Albums (Ö3 Austria)	14
German Albums (Offizielle Top 100)	10
Japanese Albums (Oricon)	27
Norwegian Albums (VG-lista)	6
Swedish Albums (Sverigetopplistan)	41
UK Albums (OCC)	42

== Certifications ==
Region	Certification	Certified units/sales
Australia (ARIA)	Gold	20,000^{^}
^{^} Shipments figures based on certification alone.
