= Jigoku-Retsuden =

Jigoku-Retsuden/Kiss Best - Kissology/Kiss Klassics

Remix album by Kiss
- Released: August 27, 2008
- Recorded: 2008
- Studio: Henson Recording Studios
- Genres: Hard rock, glam metal, dance-rock
- Length: 53:36
- Labels: DefSTAR, Sony Music Japan
- Producers: Gene Simmons, Paul Stanley

Kiss chronology
Alive! The Millennium Concert (2006)	Jigoku-Retsuden/Kiss Best - Kissology/Kiss Klassics (2008)	Kiss Alive 35 (2008)

Professional ratings
Review scores
Source	Rating
AllMusic	2.5/5 stars
Melodic	4/5 stars

Jigoku-Retsuden (地獄烈伝, which roughly translates to "Legends from Hell / Hell's Legends"), also known as Kissology and Kiss Klassics, is a limited-edition CD/DVD set released in 2008 by the band Kiss, exclusively in Japan. The CD portion of the bundle includes 15 re-recorded classic Kiss tracks by the 2008 band line-up (Paul Stanley, Gene Simmons, Tommy Thayer, Eric Singer).

The DVD portion of the bundle is concert footage from a 1977 performance at Budokan Hall in Tokyo, Japan. The CD was re-released on October 6, 2009, by Kiss as part of a digipack deluxe edition of their album Sonic Boom along with concert footage from the Alive 35 Tour.

== Track listing ==
CD
No.	Title	Writer(s)	Lead Vocals	Length
1.	"Deuce"	Gene Simmons	Simmons	3:07
2.	"Detroit Rock City"	Paul Stanley, Bob Ezrin	Stanley	3:57
3.	"Shout It Out Loud"	Stanley, Simmons, Ezrin	Stanley, Simmons	2:53
4.	"Hotter Than Hell"	Stanley	Stanley	3:10
5.	"Calling Dr. Love"	Simmons	Simmons	3:25
6.	"Love Gun"	Stanley	Stanley	3:14
7.	"I Was Made for Lovin' You"	Stanley, Vini Poncia, Desmond Child	Stanley	4:41
8.	"Heaven's on Fire"	Stanley, Child	Stanley	3:24
9.	"Lick It Up"	Stanley, Vinnie Vincent	Stanley	3:56
10.	"I Love It Loud"	Simmons, Vincent	Simmons	4:09
11.	"Forever"	Stanley, Michael Bolton	Stanley	3:53
12.	"Christine Sixteen"	Simmons	Simmons	2:59
13.	"Do You Love Me"	Stanley, Ezrin, Kim Fowley	Stanley	3:39
14.	"Black Diamond"	Stanley	Eric Singer, intro by Stanley	4:20
15.	"Rock and Roll All Nite"	Stanley, Simmons	Simmons	2:49

=== DVD (Region 2) ===
Budokan Hall, Tokyo, Japan, April 2, 1977
No.	Title	Length
1.	"Detroit Rock City"
2.	"Let Me Go, Rock 'n' Roll"
3.	"Ladies Room"
4.	"Firehouse"
5.	"I Want You"
6.	"Cold Gin"
7.	"Nothin' To Lose"
8.	"God of Thunder"
9.	"Rock and Roll All Nite"
10.	"Shout It Out Loud"
11.	"Black Diamond"

== CD personnel ==
Members

- Paul Stanley – vocals, rhythm guitar
- Gene Simmons – vocals, bass
- Eric Singer – drums, vocals
- Tommy Thayer – lead guitar, backing vocals

with

- Brian Whelan – piano

== DVD personnel ==
Members

- Paul Stanley – vocals, rhythm guitar
- Gene Simmons – vocals, bass
- Peter Criss – drums, vocals
- Ace Frehley – lead guitar, backing vocals
