= You Wanted the Best, You Got the Best!! =

Compilation album by Kiss
- Released: June 25, 1996
- Recorded: 1975, 1977 & 1996
- Genre: Hard rock
- Length: 59:16
- Label: Mercury
- Producer: Various

Kiss chronology
Kiss Unplugged (1996)	You Wanted the Best, You Got the Best!! (1996)	Greatest Kiss (1997)

You Wanted the Best, You Got the Best!! is a live compilation album released by American hard rock band Kiss. The album was issued to coincide with the group's 1996–97 Alive/Worldwide Tour. All of the songs on the album are live versions, with most taken from Alive! (1975) or Alive II (1977). Four recordings had been previously unreleased, with the liner notes stating that the tracks are outtakes from Alive! and Alive II-era recordings. The final track is an interview with the reunited group, conducted by Jay Leno.

== Reception ==
Professional ratings
Review scores
Source	Rating
AllMusic	1/5 stars
Collector's Guide to Heavy Metal	6/10
Encyclopedia of Popular Music	4/5 stars
The Rolling Stone Album Guide	3/5 stars

The album received mixed reviews. AllMusic's Stephen Thomas Erlewine gave the album one star out of five and said, "It's a rip-off album, pure and simple... There is simply no reason for this to exist... you may have wanted the best, but you didn't get it – you just got exploited." Rolling Stone's 1996 review was also negative, calling it a "shameless reunion-promotion biscuit". However, the 2004 album guide by the same magazine gave the album three stars out of five.

The album was certified gold by the RIAA on May 21, 1997.

== Track listing ==
US Version
No.	Title	Writer(s)	Origin	Length
1.	"Room Service"	Paul Stanley	Previously Unreleased	3:38
2.	"Two Timer"	Gene Simmons	Previously Unreleased	3:15
3.	"Let Me Know"	Paul Stanley	Previously Unreleased	3:38
4.	"Rock Bottom"	Ace Frehley, Paul Stanley	Alive! (1975)	3:33
5.	"Parasite"	Ace Frehley	Alive! (1975)	3:37
6.	"Firehouse"	Paul Stanley	Alive! (1975)	4:00
7.	"I Stole Your Love"	Paul Stanley	Alive II (1977)	3:32
8.	"Calling Dr. Love"	Gene Simmons	Alive II (1977)	3:35
9.	"Take Me"	Paul Stanley, Sean Delaney	Previously Unreleased	3:06
10.	"Shout It Out Loud"	Paul Stanley, Gene Simmons, Bob Ezrin	Alive II (1977)	3:14
11.	"Beth"	Peter Criss, Stan Penridge, Bob Ezrin	Alive II (1977)	2:33
12.	"Rock and Roll All Nite"	Gene Simmons, Paul Stanley	Alive! (1975)	4:01
13.	"Kiss Tells All"	Gene Simmons, Paul Stanley, Peter Criss, Ace Frehley, Jay Leno		17:34

The Japanese CD and US vinyl releases had another live track ("New York Groove"), featuring Eric Carr on drums rather than Peter Criss, which was also released as a promotional single at Blockbuster. The track is also available on the Apple Music version of the album.

- Room Service (live) was previously unreleased, recorded in Davenport, Iowa in 1975
- Two Timer (live) was previously unreleased, recorded at Cobo Arena Detroit, Michigan on May 16, 1975
- Let Me Know (live) was previously unreleased, recorded at Cobo Arena Detroit, Michigan on May 16, 1975
- Take Me (live) previously unreleased, recorded in Los Angeles, California in 1977

== Personnel ==
Kiss

- Paul Stanley – rhythm guitar, vocals
- Gene Simmons – bass guitar, vocals
- Ace Frehley – lead guitar, vocals on "New York Groove"
- Peter Criss – drums, vocals on "Beth"
- Eric Carr – drums on "New York Groove"

== Charts ==
Chart (1996)	Peak position
Australian Albums (ARIA)	26
Austrian Albums (Ö3 Austria)	35
Canada Top Albums/CDs (RPM)	34
Dutch Albums (Album Top 100)	82
Finnish Albums (Suomen virallinen lista)	39
Japanese Albums (Oricon)	70
Norwegian Albums (VG-lista)	29
Scottish Albums (Official Charts)	95
Swedish Albums (Sverigetopplistan)	25
UK Albums (Official Charts)	77
UK Rock & Metal Albums (Official Charts)	7
US Billboard 200	17

== Certifications ==
Region	Certification	Certified units/sales
United States (RIAA)	Gold	500,000^{^}
^{^} Shipments figures based on certification alone.
