= Love Gun Tour =

1977 concert tour by Kiss

Love Gun Tour '77
- Tour by Kiss
- Poster to the concert in Houston
- Associated album: Love Gun
- Start date: July 8, 1977
- End date: September 5, 1977
- Legs: 2
- No. of shows: 32

Kiss concert chronology
- Rock & Roll Over Tour (1976–1977); Love Gun Tour (1977); Alive II Tour (1977–1978)

The Love Gun Tour was a concert tour by Kiss, in support of Love Gun.

== History ==
This was the first tour where Ace Frehley sang lead vocals, on "Shock Me". The three Los Angeles shows were recorded for Alive II. This is the only tour to feature the song "Hooligan" in the set list. This is the first tour to feature "Calling Dr. Love" in the set list. Cheap Trick and Styx were the opening acts throughout the tour.

Peter Criss had gotten injured when the van carrying equipment and the other members had overturned, when the band was practicing at an airport hangar and preparing to travel to Canada for the first show.

In the tour program for the band's final tour, Paul Stanley reflected on the tour:

When we played in Japan in the late '70s, nothing could prepare you for the hysteria because when people are telling you how big you are, you're big compared to what? Until you're faced with mass hysteria it doesn't really sink in. For you not having been in a certain country makes them that much more rabid for you to go.

== Reception ==
John Kafentzis, a report from The Spokesman-Review who attended the Seattle performance stated that the choreography was precise and the stunts were well-planned, leaving no time to practice music. He however, criticized that each song sounded like the last, which he said "sounds like the Saturday night rumble of dozens of mufflers on Riverside". He continued, by stating that the band put on a show and concluding that the well-behaved audience "got their $7 worth".

== Tour dates ==
List of tour dates with date, city, country, venue, support act(s) and attendance
Date	City	Country	Venue	Support Act(s)	Attendance
July 8, 1977	Halifax	Canada	Halifax Forum	Cheap Trick	6,000 / 6,200 (97%)
July 9, 1977	Moncton	Canada	Moncton Coliseum	Cheap Trick	—N/a
~~July 10, 1977~~	Halifax	Canada	Forum	Cheap Trick	—N/a
July 12, 1977	Montreal	Canada	Montreal Forum	Cheap Trick	~12,000 / 18,000 (66%)
July 14, 1977	Ottawa	Canada	Ottawa Civic Centre	Cheap Trick	—N/a
July 16, 1977	Kitchener	Canada	Kitchener Memorial Auditorium	Cheap Trick	~5,800 / 7,800 (74%)
July 18, 1977	London	Canada	Treasure Island Gardens	Cheap Trick	~4,400 / 5,800 (76%)
July 19, 1977	Greater Sudbury	Canada	Sudbury Community Arena	Cheap Trick	—N/a
July 21, 1977	Winnipeg	Canada	Winnipeg Arena	Cheap Trick	~8,000 / 9,000 (89%)
July 24, 1977	Vancouver	Canada	Pacific Coliseum	Cheap Trick	~10,000 / 15,571 (64%)
~~July 25, 1977~~	Victoria	Canada	Victoria Memorial Arena	Cheap Trick	—N/a
July 27, 1977	Edmonton	Canada	Northlands Coliseum	Cheap Trick	11,494 / 17,000 (67%)
July 28, 1977	Lethbridge	Canada	Sportsplex	Cheap Trick	~7,000 / 8,000 (87%)
July 31, 1977	Calgary	Canada	Stampede Corral	Cheap Trick	~7,000 / 7,265 (96%)
~~August 2, 1977~~	Saskatoon	Canada	Saskatoon Arena	Cheap Trick	—N/a
August 2, 1977	Regina	Canada	Agridome	Cheap Trick	~6,800 / 6,800 (100%)
August 4, 1977	Salt Lake City	United States	Salt Palace	Cheap Trick	—N/a
~~August 6, 1977~~	Missoula	United States	Adams Fieldhouse	Cheap Trick	—N/a
August 7, 1977	Billings	United States	Yellowstone Metra	Cheap Trick	9,971 / 11,500 (87%)
August 8, 1977	Rapid City	United States	Rushmore Plaza Civic Center	Cheap Trick	—N/a
August 11, 1977	Spokane	United States	Spokane Coliseum	Cheap Trick	8,500 / 8,500 (100%)
August 12, 1977	Seattle	United States	Seattle Center Coliseum	Cheap Trick	~14,000 / 14,405 (97%)
August 13, 1977	Portland	United States	Portland Memorial Coliseum	Cheap Trick	~12,000 / 13,200 (91%)
August 16, 1977	Daly City	United States	Cow Palace	Cheap Trick	14,500 / 14,500 (100%)
August 17, 1977	Fresno	United States	Selland Arena	Cheap Trick	7,333 / 7,333 (100%)
August 19, 1977	San Diego	United States	San Diego Sports Arena	Cheap Trick	11,925 / 14,500 (82%)
August 21, 1977	Tucson	United States	Tucson Community Center	Cheap Trick	6,561 / 9,400 (70%)
August 22, 1977	Phoenix	United States	Arizona Veterans Memorial Coliseum	Cheap Trick	~13,000 / 13,000 (100%)
August 26, 1977	Inglewood	United States	The Forum	Cheap Trick	17,763 / 17,763 (100%)
August 27, 1977	Inglewood	United States	The Forum	Cheap Trick	—N/a
August 28, 1977	Inglewood	United States	The Forum	Cheap Trick	—N/a
September 1, 1977	Houston	United States	The Summit	Styx	29,900 / 29,900 (100%)
September 2, 1977	Houston	United States	The Summit	Styx	29,900 / 29,900 (100%)
September 4, 1977	Fort Worth	United States	Tarrant County Convention Center	Styx	~10,690 / 10,690 (100%)
September 5, 1977	Fort Worth	United States	Tarrant County Convention Center	Styx	—N/a

== Personnel ==
- Paul Stanley – vocals, rhythm guitar
- Gene Simmons – vocals, bass
- Peter Criss – drums, vocals
- Ace Frehley – lead guitar, vocals
