= Kiss Sonic Boom over Europe =

Kiss Sonic Boom Over Europe

Live album by Kiss
- Released: 2010
- Recorded: 2010
- Genre: Hard rock
- Length: (Varies)
- Label: Simfy Live

Kiss chronology
Sonic Boom (2009)	Kiss Sonic Boom Over Europe (2010)	Monster (2012)

Kiss Sonic Boom Over Europe is a series of live albums (2 CDs, a USB stick or an MP3 download), containing a recording of the complete set from a European show on the Sonic Boom Over Europe Tour which began May 1, 2010 in Sheffield, England. The discs were recorded and distributed through Simfy Live. This tour was in support of the band's then-latest studio effort, 2009's Sonic Boom.

The USB stick featuring live tracks.

== Track listing ==
Although the track list differs slightly from show to show, it drew material from the band's history, emphasizing on material from the recently released Sonic Boom album. According to Paul Stanley the band played "Crazy Crazy Nights" (first time since Hot in the Shade Tour), "God Gave Rock 'n' Roll to You II" and three songs from Sonic Boom: "Modern Day Delilah", "Say Yeah" and "I'm An Animal". The show in Milan, Italy has all songs except "Beth" and a slight difference in chronology of songs played.

=== Songs live Europe 2010 (Sonic Boom Over Europe) ===
1. "Modern Day Delilah"
2. "Cold Gin"
3. "Let Me Go, Rock And Roll"
4. "Firehouse"
5. "Say Yeah"
6. "Deuce"
7. "Crazy Crazy Nights"
8. "Calling Dr. Love"
9. "Shock Me"
10. "I’m an Animal"
11. "100,000 Years"
12. "I Love It Loud"
13. "Love Gun"
14. "Black Diamond" (‘Whole Lotta Love’ Stanley's solo)
15. "Detroit Rock City"
16. "Beth"
17. "Lick It Up"
18. "Shout It Out Loud"
19. "I Was Made for Lovin' You"
20. "God Gave Rock 'n' Roll to You II"
21. "Rock and Roll All Nite"

=== Songs live American Tour 2010 (Sonic Boom American Dates) ===
The tour was also known as "The Hottest Show on Earth Tour"

1. "Modern Day Delilah"
2. "Cold Gin"
3. "Let Me Go, Rock And Roll"
4. "Firehouse"
5. "Say Yeah"
6. "Deuce"
7. "Crazy Crazy Nights"
8. "Calling Dr. Love"
9. "Shock Me"
10. "I’m an Animal"
11. "100,000 Years"
12. "I Love It Loud"
13. "Love Gun"
14. "Black Diamond"
15. "Detroit Rock City"

ENCORE:

1. "Beth"
2. "Lick It Up"/"Won't Get Fooled Again"
3. "Shout It Out Loud"
4. "I Was Made for Lovin' You"
5. "God Gave Rock 'n' Roll to You II"
6. "Rock and Roll All Nite"

== Personnel ==
- Paul Stanley - vocals, rhythm guitar
- Gene Simmons - vocals, bass
- Eric Singer - drums, vocals
- Tommy Thayer - lead guitar, vocals

with

- Mike "Spike" Rush - The Introduction "Voice"
- Tobias Nievelstein - Recording and Mixengineer
- Spiro Papadatos - Design
