= Neal Preston =

American photographer (born 1952)

- Born: 1952 (age 73–74); New York City, U.S.
- Occupation: Photographer
- Years active: 1970s–present
- Known for: Rock music photography, official Led Zeppelin tour photographer

Neal Preston (born 1952) is an American photographer, based in Los Angeles, California.

Preston is known primarily for his photographs of rock musicians. He has worked closely with artists including Led Zeppelin, Queen, The Who, Bruce Springsteen, Fleetwood Mac, Michael Jackson, Whitney Houston.

== Life and career ==
Preston was born in New York City. He attended Forest Hills High School in Queens, New York. Photography started out as a hobby for him, and even before graduating from high school in 1970, he was already shooting rock shows throughout the New York City area and had formed a small photography company, earning assignments from a variety of publications.

In October 1971, Preston moved permanently to Los Angeles. Over the past four decades, his work has been featured in countless magazines and used on the covers of hundreds of music-related releases.

In 1985, Preston was chosen as one of the official photographers for Bob Geldof's Live Aid concert at London's Wembley Stadium. In 1988, he was official tour photographer for Amnesty International's A Conspiracy of Hope international tour, featuring Bruce Springsteen, Sting, and Peter Gabriel. His archives were the primary source of still photographs for over 50 episodes of VH-1's music documentary series, Behind the Music.

Preston has also worked extensively in non-music fields, shooting a wide variety of subjects for both editorial and commercial clients. In 1978, he joined the New York-based photo agency Camera 5.

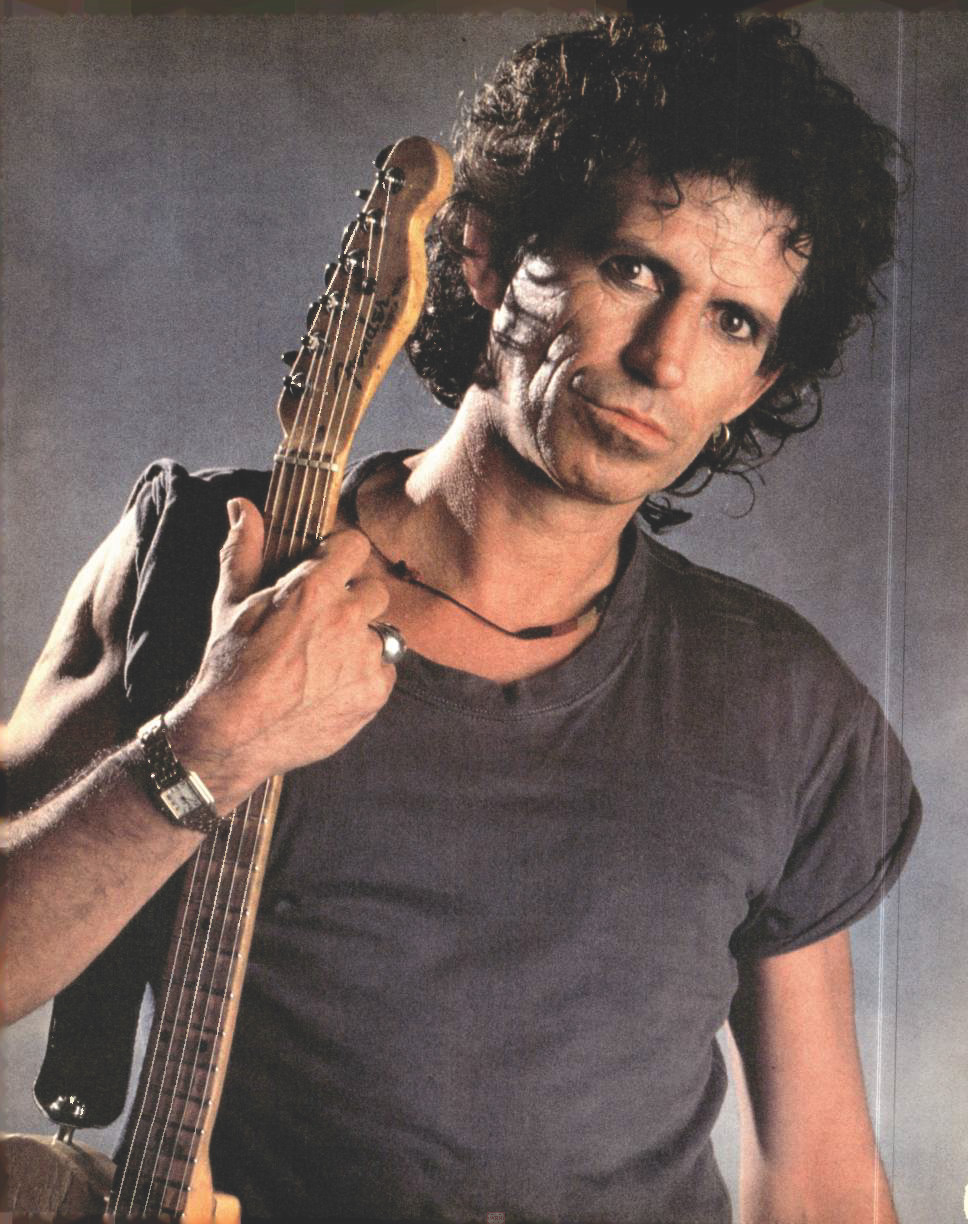
Keith Richards by Preston c. 1988

In 1979, he began a long association with People magazine, with over 700 shoots to his credit. He has also shot covers of Newsweek, Time, and Rolling Stone, and many other magazines and books.

In sports, Preston has photographed six Olympic Games, and covered heavyweight boxing, NBA basketball, World Cup soccer, professional figure skating, and Major League Baseball.

Preston has served as both unit and special photographer for a string of feature films directed by his long-time friend Cameron Crowe, including Almost Famous, Vanilla Sky, Elizabethtown, and We Bought a Zoo.

Preston is the author of several books devoted to his photography of Led Zeppelin, whom he first shot in 1970 and for whom he later served as official tour photographer.

Preston remains active today – shooting music, glamour, and movie stills; managing his archives; and mounting gallery exhibitions of his work.
