= Rock & Roll Over Tour =

1976–1977 concert tour by Kiss

Rock and Roll Over Tour
- Tour by Kiss
- Poster to the concert in Detroit, USA
- Associated album: Rock and Roll Over
- Start date: November 24, 1976
- End date: April 4, 1977
- Legs: 2
- No. of shows: 70

Kiss concert chronology
- Destroyer Tour (1976); Rock & Roll Over Tour (1976–1977); Love Gun Tour (1977)

The Rock and Roll Over Tour was a concert tour by the American rock band Kiss. It began November 24, 1976 (shortly after the release of the Rock and Roll Over album) and ended April 4, 1977.

== History ==
On February 18, 1977, the band performed for the first time at Madison Square Garden – a venue all four members had long dreamed of playing. That night was also the Garden debut of opening act Sammy Hagar.

Kiss also performed in Japan for the first time on this tour. They played Budokan Hall four nights in a row, breaking an attendance record set by The Beatles. On December 12, 1976, Ace Frehley suffered a severe electrical shock on stage. The consequent delay lasted about fifteen minutes but Frehley resumed the show, despite having lost feeling in one of his hands. Inspired by the event, he wrote "Shock Me", which appeared on Kiss' next album, 1977's Love Gun. It is the first Kiss song on which he sings lead vocals.

This was the first tour on which "Beth" was performed. Instead of being played by the band, it was sung by drummer Peter Criss to a recording of the instrumental track from the Destroyer album.

In the tour program for the band's final tour, Stanley reflected on the tour:

In 1972, I was a taxi driver and I remember driving people to the Garden to see Elvis Presley. I thought someday people will be driving to the Garden to see me and just a few years later Kiss was headlining the Garden. It was a big deal to play for our families and friends... nerve-wracking to say the least. We were beside ourselves backstage, sweating and very, very nervous. And before we went on, all of us shook hands and said "Well, we're here. We're really at the Garden."

== Tour dates ==
List of 1976 concerts
Date	City	Country	Venue	Support act(s)
November 24, 1976	Savannah	United States	Savannah Civic Center	Graham Parker & The Rumour
November 25, 1976	Charlotte	United States	Charlotte Coliseum	Jesse Bolt
November 27, 1976	Raleigh	United States	J.S. Dorton Arena	The Raisin Band
November 28, 1976	Greenville	United States	Greenville Memorial Auditorium	Climax Blues Band
November 30, 1976	Columbus	United States	Columbus Municipal Auditorium	Tom Petty and the Heartbreakers
December 2, 1976	Memphis	United States	Mid-South Coliseum	Dr. Hook
December 3, 1976	Jackson	United States	Mississippi Coliseum	Dr. Hook
December 4, 1976	New Orleans	United States	New Orleans Municipal Auditorium	Blackfoot
December 5, 1976	Mobile	United States	Mobile Municipal Auditorium	Blackfoot
December 7, 1976	Huntsville	United States	Von Braun Civic Center	Dr. Hook
December 8, 1976	Macon	United States	Macon Coliseum	Uriah Heep
December 10, 1976	Jacksonville	United States	Jacksonville Memorial Coliseum	Uriah Heep
December 11, 1976	Pembroke Pines	United States	Hollywood Sportatorium	Uriah Heep
December 12, 1976^{1}	Lakeland	United States	Lakeland Civic Center	Uriah Heep
December 15, 1976	Buffalo	United States	Buffalo Memorial Auditorium	Uriah Heep
December 16, 1976	Syracuse	United States	Onondaga County War Memorial	Uriah Heep
December 18, 1976	New Haven	United States	New Haven Coliseum	Uriah Heep
December 19, 1976	Landover	United States	Capital Centre	Bob Seger & the Silver Bullet Band
December 21, 1976	Philadelphia	United States	The Spectrum	Bob Seger & the Silver Bullet Band
December 27, 1976	Fayetteville	United States	Cumberland County Memorial Arena	Blackfoot
December 28, 1976	Roanoke	United States	Roanoke Civic Center	Uriah Heep
December 30, 1976	Augusta	United States	Augusta Civic Center	Natural Gas

List of 1977 concerts
Date	City	Country	Venue	Support act(s)
January 1, 1977	Providence	United States	Providence Civic Center	Uriah Heep
January 5, 1977	Abilene	United States	Taylor County Expo Center	Uriah Heep
January 6, 1977	Tulsa	United States	Tulsa Assembly Center	Uriah Heep
January 7, 1977	Norman	United States	Lloyd Noble Center	Uriah Heep
January 9, 1977	Wichita	United States	Levitt Arena	Uriah Heep
January 10, 1977	Amarillo	United States	Amarillo Civic Center	Uriah Heep
January 11, 1977	Albuquerque	United States	Tingley Coliseum	Uriah Heep
January 13, 1977	Salt Lake City	United States	Salt Palace	Uriah Heep
January 15, 1977	Denver	United States	McNichols Sports Arena	Uriah Heep
January 17, 1977	Grand Forks	United States	UND Fieldhouse	Uriah Heep
January 18, 1977	Duluth	United States	Duluth Arena-Auditorium	Uriah Heep
January 20, 1977	Lincoln	United States	Pershing Auditorium	Uriah Heep
January 21, 1977	Des Moines	United States	Iowa Veterans Memorial Auditorium	Uriah Heep
January 22, 1977	Chicago	United States	Chicago Stadium	Uriah Heep
January 24, 1977	Fort Wayne	United States	Allen County War Memorial Coliseum	Uriah Heep
January 25, 1977	Terre Haute	United States	Hulman Center	Uriah Heep
January 27, 1977	Detroit	United States	Cobo Arena	Uriah Heep
January 28, 1977	Detroit	United States	Cobo Arena	Uriah Heep
January 29, 1977	Detroit	United States	Cobo Arena	Uriah Heep
February 1, 1977	Milwaukee	United States	Milwaukee Auditorium	Uriah Heep
February 2, 1977	Milwaukee	United States	Milwaukee Auditorium	Uriah Heep
February 3, 1977	Green Bay	United States	Brown County Veterans Memorial Arena	Uriah Heep
February 4, 1977	Madison	United States	Dane County Expo Coliseum	Uriah Heep
February 6, 1977	Bloomington	United States	Metropolitan Sports Center	Uriah Heep
February 8, 1977	Omaha	United States	Omaha Civic Auditorium	Uriah Heep
February 9, 1977	Kansas City	United States	Kemper Arena	Head East
February 10, 1977	Waterloo	United States	McElroy Auditorium	The Dictators
February 12, 1977	Bismarck	United States	Bismarck Civic Center	The Dictators
February 16, 1977	Hartford	United States	Hartford Civic Center	Sammy Hagar
February 18, 1977	New York City	United States	Madison Square Garden	Sammy Hagar
February 21, 1977	Uniondale	United States	Nassau Veterans Memorial Coliseum	Sammy Hagar
February 26, 1977	Johnson City	United States	Freedom Hall Civic Center	The Dictators
February 27, 1977	Columbia	United States	Carolina Coliseum	The Dictators
March 1, 1977	Asheville	United States	Asheville Civic Center	The Dictators
March 3, 1977	Birmingham	United States	BJCC Coliseum	The Dictators
March 5, 1977	Lexington	United States	Rupp Arena	Legs Diamond
March 6, 1977	Columbus	United States	St. John Arena	Legs Diamond
March 7, 1977	Hampton	United States	Hampton Coliseum	Legs Diamond
March 24, 1977	Osaka	Japan	Osaka Kōsei Nenkin Kaikan	Bow Wow
March 25, 1977	Osaka	Japan	Osaka Kōsei Nenkin Kaikan	Bow Wow
March 26, 1977	Kyoto	Japan	Kyoto Kaikan	Bow Wow
March 28, 1977	Nagoya	Japan	Aichi Prefectural Gymnasium	Bow Wow
March 29, 1977	Osaka	Japan	Osaka Festival Hall	Bow Wow
March 30, 1977	Fukuoka	Japan	Fukuoka Kyuden Kinen Gymnasium	Bow Wow
April 1, 1977	Tokyo	Japan	Nippon Budokan	Bow Wow
April 2, 1977^{2}	Tokyo	Japan	Nippon Budokan	Bow Wow
April 4, 1977	Tokyo	Japan	Nippon Budokan	Bow Wow

- ^Note 1 Ace Frehley was nearly electrocuted, resulting in a 30-minute delay
- ^Note 2Kiss performed two shows on this day, one at 3pm and one at 7pm.

=== Box office score data ===
List of box office score data with date, city, venue, attendance, gross, references
Date	City	Venue	Attendance	Gross	Ref(s)
November 24, 1976	Savannah, United States	Savannah Civic Center	8,000 / 8,000	$60,000	
December 2, 1976	Memphis, United States	Mid-South Coliseum	12,000 / 12,000	$73,250	
December 11, 1976	Pembroke Pines, United States	Hollywood Sportatorium	12,943	$91,323	
December 15, 1976	Buffalo, United States	Buffalo Memorial Auditorium	12,182	$75,274	
December 18, 1976	New Haven, United States	New Haven Coliseum	9,300	$66,828	
January 9, 1977	Wichita, United States	Levitt Arena	10,886 / 10,886	$76,202	
January 20, 1977	Lincoln, United States	Pershing Auditorium	8,387 / 8,387	$57,605	
January 21, 1977	Des Moines, United States	Iowa Veterans Memorial Auditorium	14,234 / 14,234	$93,146	
February 1, 1977	Milwaukee, United States	Milwaukee Auditorium	12,311 / 12,311	$86,719	
February 2, 1977	Milwaukee, United States	Milwaukee Auditorium	12,311 / 12,311	$86,719	
February 3, 1977	Green Bay, United States	Brown County Veterans Memorial Arena	7,008 / 7,008	$52,560	
February 4, 1977	Madison, United States	Dane County Expo Coliseum	10,050 / 10,050	$75,375	
February 6, 1977	Bloomington, United States	Metropolitan Sports Center	16,800 / 16,800	$104,900	
February 8, 1977	Omaha, United States	Omaha Civic Auditorium	12,000 / 12,000	$78,000	
February 9, 1977	Kansas City, United States	Kemper Arena	14,794	$103,558	
February 18, 1977	New York City, United States	Madison Square Garden	19,600 / 19,600	$145,000	
March 7, 1977	Hampton, United States	Hampton Coliseum	9,949	$67,928	

== Personnel ==
- Paul Stanley – vocals, rhythm guitar
- Gene Simmons – vocals, bass
- Peter Criss – drums, vocals
- Ace Frehley – lead guitar, backing vocals
