= Alive II =

Live album by Kiss
- Released: October 24, 1977
- Recorded: April 2 and August 26–28, 1977 (live); September 13–16, 1977 (studio)
- Venues: The Forum, Inglewood, CA; Capitol Theatre, Passaic, NJ; Budokan Hall, Tokyo, Japan
- Studios: Electric Lady, New York City
- Genres: Hard rock; heavy metal
- Length: 71:26
- Label: Casablanca
- Producers: Eddie Kramer, Kiss

Kiss chronology
| Love Gun (1977) | Alive II (1977) | Double Platinum (1978) |

Singles from Alive II
- 1. "Shout It Out Loud" Released: November 29, 1977; 2. "Rocket Ride" Released: February 22, 1978

Alive II is the second live album by American hard rock band Kiss, released on October 24, 1977, by Casablanca Records. The band had released three albums (Destroyer, Rock and Roll Over, and Love Gun) since the previous live outing, the 1975 release Alive!, so they drew upon the variety of new tracks, with Eddie Kramer producing. The album is one of the best selling in the Kiss discography, being the band's first to be certified double platinum in February 1996 (signifying sales of over 1,000,000 for a double album), the same month the Kiss reunion tour was announced. It has continued to sell in the US in the Soundscan era, selling over 300,000 copies from 1991 and to March 2012.

== Album information ==
The origins of Alive II go back to early 1977 when the band's manager Bill Aucoin suggested that Eddie Kramer record a live album during the evening show at Budokan Hall in Tokyo, Japan on April 2, 1977. The plan was to release a live album to give Kiss some time off before recording the album that would become Love Gun later that autumn. Kramer finished work on the album, but Casablanca and Kiss deemed it unusable, and the band forged ahead with their Love Gun sessions.

Most of the live tracks on Alive II were recorded during the band's August 26–28 shows at the Forum while on their Love Gun Tour. The 3 p.m. soundchecks at the August 26 and 27 shows were recorded and later used on the album (i.e. "Tomorrow and Tonight" with crowd noise being dubbed in later). "Beth" and "I Want You" were lifted from the unused Japanese live recordings and repurposed for the finished album. As the band did not want to duplicate songs included on Alive!, the songs chosen for the three live sides of the album were all drawn from Kiss' three preceding studio albums: Destroyer, Rock and Roll Over, and Love Gun.

The new songs on side 4 (tracks 6–10 on the second CD of the reissue) are tracks recorded live without an audience at Capitol Theatre in Passaic, New Jersey, and overdubbed and mixed at Electric Lady Studios in New York City on September 13–16, 1977. Although Ace Frehley was originally credited for lead guitar on the studio tracks, later sources confirmed that Bob Kulick played lead guitar on the tracks "All American Man", "Rockin' in the U.S.A.", and "Larger Than Life", with Paul Stanley playing all guitars on the cover "Any Way You Want It". Frehley's sole involvement for the studio songs was "Rocket Ride" (originally written for his solo album), on which he sang lead vocals and played both guitar and bass guitar. "Rockin' in the U.S.A." had references to both the previous year's Spirit of 76 European Tour and to that spring's debut in Japan.

Several early copies of the album's cover featured a rare misprint of three additional songs ("Take Me", "Hooligan", and "Do You Love Me?") with a slightly altered song order. None of these additional songs appeared on the LP. On the misprint, "Take Me" is after "Detroit Rock City", with "King of the Night Time World" appearing after "Ladies Room" on side one. Side two features "Hooligan" after "Shock Me", which is placed after "Hard Luck Woman". On side three, "Do You Love Me?" appears after "God of Thunder", with "Beth" between "I Want You" and "Shout It Out Loud".

== Promotional items ==
The original vinyl issue of Alive II was a 2-LP set with a gatefold cover and picture inner sleeves. Continuing the Kiss tradition of including promotional items with their albums, Alive II was packaged with a full-color booklet titled "The Evolution of Kiss" and a set of temporary transfer tattoos in a cartoon style. The tattoos depicted the band logo, Kiss Army logo, band member heads, and member signatures and symbols. The symbols were meant to represent the four personas of the group and included a skull and crossbones for Gene Simmons, a rose and star with an eye for Paul Stanley, a Saturn-like planet and block print-style "ACE" for Frehley, and a drum and cat's head for Peter Criss. The rose and "ACE" are copies of Stanley and Frehley's actual tattoos, respectively. A merchandise order form was also included with the album, listing an array of official Kiss merchandise as well as a chance to "enlist" in the Kiss Army. The inner sleeves depicted crazed Kiss fans in a confetti storm and the band's album discography to date.

== Releases ==
Alive II was released on October 24, 1977. It was first issued on CD as a double-CD set in what has now become known as a "fatboy" 2CD case. When the Kiss back catalog was remastered in 1997, it was housed in a slimline 2CD case. In keeping with the rest of the reissue program, the artwork was restored, including a reproduction set of tattoos. The booklet "The Evolution of Kiss"' and the picture inner sleeves were incorporated as part of the CD booklet.

Alive II was re-released in 2006 as part of Kiss Alive! 1975-2000. This time, the album was released on a single disc and contained "Rock and Roll All Nite" as a bonus track.

== Reception ==
Professional ratings
Review scores
| Source | Rating |
|---|---|
| AllMusic | 4/5 stars |
| Collector's Guide to Heavy Metal | 7/10 |
| Encyclopedia of Popular Music | 3/5 stars |
| Pitchfork | 7.0/10 |
| The Rolling Stone Album Guide | 3.5/5 stars |
| Spin Alternative Record Guide | 6/10 |
| Uncut | 2/5 stars |

Coming off of a period of extensive touring, Alive II became the band's third album to ship platinum and their fifth to be certified platinum. It reached the No. 7 spot on the Billboard 200 and was on the charts for 33 weeks.

In a contemporary review, John Swenson of Rolling Stone criticized Kiss for copying the live performances of the Rolling Stones and the Who, but acknowledged the band's "improved instrumental technique" and attitude, concluding that "Alive II captures the essence of live rock & roll very well". Modern reviews are generally positive. Critic Greg Prato of AllMusic remarked that several tracks such as "Detroit Rock City", "Shock Me" and "Shout It Out Loud" featured an "adrenaline-charged" vibe. He lauded the album for showing the group in its element as an "exciting live band". Jason Josephes of Pitchfork considered Alive II "not a bad album, but definitely not essential." Martin Popoff called it "a loud-and-proud document to what would be, hands down, the most exciting year for the communion of this band and their Kiss Army planned fans."

== Track listing ==
All credits adapted from the original release.

Side one
| No. | Title | Writer(s) | Lead vocals | Length |
|---|---|---|---|---|
| 1. | "Detroit Rock City" (Live) | Paul Stanley, Bob Ezrin | Stanley | 3:58 |
| 2. | "King of the Night Time World" (Live) | Stanley, Ezrin, Kim Fowley, Mark Anthony | Stanley | 3:06 |
| 3. | "Ladies Room" (Live) | Gene Simmons | Simmons | 3:11 |
| 4. | "Makin' Love" (Live) | Stanley, Sean Delaney | Stanley | 3:13 |
| 5. | "Love Gun" (Live) | Stanley | Stanley | 3:34 |

Side two
| No. | Title | Writer(s) | Lead vocals | Length |
|---|---|---|---|---|
| 6. | "Calling Dr. Love" (Live) | Simmons | Simmons | 3:32 |
| 7. | "Christine Sixteen" (Live) | Simmons | Simmons | 2:45 |
| 8. | "Shock Me" (Live) | Ace Frehley | Frehley | 5:51 |
| 9. | "Hard Luck Woman" (Live) | Stanley | Peter Criss | 3:06 |
| 10. | "Tomorrow and Tonight" (Live) | Stanley | Stanley | 3:20 |

Side three
| No. | Title | Writer(s) | Lead vocals | Length |
|---|---|---|---|---|
| 11. | "I Stole Your Love" (Live) | Stanley | Stanley | 3:36 |
| 12. | "Beth" (Live) | Criss, Ezrin, Stan Penridge | Criss | 2:24 |
| 13. | "God of Thunder" (Live) | Stanley | Simmons | 5:16 |
| 14. | "I Want You" (Live) | Stanley | Stanley | 4:14 |
| 15. | "Shout It Out Loud" (Live) | Stanley, Simmons, Ezrin | Stanley, Simmons | 3:37 |

Side four
| No. | Title | Writer(s) | Lead vocals | Length |
|---|---|---|---|---|
| 16. | "All American Man" (Studio) | Stanley, Delaney | Stanley | 3:13 |
| 17. | "Rockin' in the U.S.A." (Studio) | Simmons | Simmons | 2:38 |
| 18. | "Larger Than Life" (Studio) | Simmons | Simmons | 3:55 |
| 19. | "Rocket Ride" (Studio) | Frehley, Delaney | Frehley | 4:07 |
| 20. | "Any Way You Want It" (Studio) | Dave Clark | Stanley | 2:33 |

== Notes ==
- Tracks 1–8, 11, 13 and 15 recorded at The Forum, Los Angeles, CA, August 26–28, 1977
- Tracks 9, 10 and 16–20 recorded at the Capitol Theatre, Passaic, NJ, September 13–16, 1977 and Electric Lady Studios, New York, NY
- Tracks 12, 14 recorded at Budokan Hall, Tokyo, Japan, April 2, 1977

== Personnel ==
Kiss

- Paul Stanley – vocals, rhythm guitar; all guitars and bass (20)
- Gene Simmons – vocals, bass; rhythm guitar (18)
- Peter Criss – drums, vocals
- Ace Frehley – lead guitar, vocals; all guitars and bass (19)

Additional musicians

- Eddie Balandas – introduction
- Bob Kulick – lead guitar (16–18)

Technical

- Eddie Kramer – producer, engineer, mixing
- Kiss – producer
- Corky Stasiak – co-engineer (16–20)
- Neil Dorfsman – assistant engineer
- George Marino – mastering
- Mirage, Inc. – album photographs
- Richard Arens – "The Evolution of Kiss" photography
- Julius Baum – "The Evolution of Kiss" photography
- Fin Costello – "The Evolution of Kiss" photography
- Len DeLessio – "The Evolution of Kiss" photography
- Bob Gruen – "The Evolution of Kiss" photography
- Andrew Kent – "The Evolution of Kiss" photography
- Barry LeVine – "The Evolution of Kiss" photography
- Robert Markelitz – "The Evolution of Kiss" photography
- Neal Preston – "The Evolution of Kiss" photography
- Chip Rock – "The Evolution of Kiss" photography
- Raeanne Rubenstein – "The Evolution of Kiss" photography
- Dennis Woloch – design

== Charts ==
=== Weekly charts ===
| Chart (1977–1978) | Peak position |
|---|---|
| Australian Albums (Kent Music Report) | 17 |
| Canada Top Albums/CDs (RPM) | 5 |
| New Zealand Albums (RMNZ) | 13 |
| Japanese Albums (Oricon) | 10 |
| Swedish Albums (Sverigetopplistan) | 28 |
| UK Albums (Official Charts) | 60 |
| US Billboard 200 | 7 |

=== Year-end charts ===
| Chart (1978) | Position |
|---|---|
| US Billboard 200 | 46 |

== Certifications ==
| Region | Certification | Certified units/sales |
|---|---|---|
| Australia (ARIA) | Gold | 20,000^{^} |
| Canada (Music Canada) | Platinum | 100,000^{^} |
| United States (RIAA) | 2× Platinum | 2,000,000^{^} |
^{^} Shipments figures based on certification alone.

== Bibliography ==
- Leaf, David; Sharp, Ken (2003). KISS: Behind the Mask: The Official Authorized Biography. New York City: Warner Books. ISBN 0-446-53073-5.
