= Christine Sixteen =

Single by Kiss

from the album Love Gun
- B-side: "Shock Me"
- Released: June 1977 (US)
- Recorded: 1977 at Record Plant Studios, New York City
- Genre: Hard rock
- Length: 3:14
- Label: Casablanca Records NB-889-AS-RE-1 (US)
- Songwriter: Gene Simmons
- Producers: Eddie Kramer, Kiss

Kiss singles chronology
"Calling Dr. Love" / "Take Me" (1976)	"Christine Sixteen" / "Shock Me" (1977)	"Love Gun" / "Hooligan" (1977)

Music video
- "Christine Sixteen" on YouTube

"Christine Sixteen" is a song by American hard rock band Kiss from their sixth studio album Love Gun. Released as a single in the US in 1977, the song peaked at number 25 on the Billboard Hot 100 chart that year. It also did well in Canada, peaking at number 22.

It was included on the Greatest Kiss, The Very Best of Kiss, The Millennium Collection: The Best of Kiss, Jigoku-Retsuden and Kiss 40 hits collections. A live version of "Christine Sixteen" appears on Alive II.

== Composition ==
Written and sung by bassist/vocalist Gene Simmons, The title "Christine Sixteen" was originated by bandmate Paul Stanley who was planning to write a song under the title, until Simmons beat him to it. Two different time lengths are printed on the single; one at 3:13, and another at 2:52. Both versions run 3:10.

According to interviews in Guitar World, both Eddie and Alex Van Halen played on the original demos. When Kiss recorded their version of the song, Simmons said that he made lead guitarist Ace Frehley copy Eddie's solo from the demo.

== Reception ==
"Christine Sixteen" is about an older man who is infatuated with a 16-year-old girl named Christine. The song's subject and lyrics were controversial and made some hit radio stations reluctant to put it on their playlists, while others (including WABC in the band's home town of New York, and WKBW in Buffalo) only played it after 7 p.m. as an album cut.

Cash Box said that "it's a tale of teenage lust, put to a bump and grind rock accompaniment that utilizes channel-hopping vocals."

== "Shock Me" ==
The B-side to "Christine Sixteen" is the album track "Shock Me". It was written by Frehley, who made his lead vocal debut with the track. The song was inspired by an event that took place during Kiss' Rock and Roll Over tour, when he was nearly electrocuted from his electric guitar. It was ranked #43 in Guitar World magazine's "50 Greatest Guitar Solos of All Time".

"Shock Me" appears on the Japanese version of Greatest Kiss. A live version of "Shock Me" appears on Alive II and Kiss Sonic Boom over Europe. Tommy Thayer handles lead vocals on the Sonic Boom over Europe version.

== Covers & samples ==
"Christine Sixteen" was sampled by Tone Lōc in his 1989 song "Funky Cold Medina". The song was covered by All on Hard to Believe: Kiss Covers Compilation and by the Gin Blossoms on the 1994 Kiss tribute album Kiss My Ass: Classic Kiss Regrooved. It was also covered by punk/goth band The Nuns on their 2003 album New York Vampires.

Kiss performed "Christine Sixteen" with the Gin Blossoms on both The Tonight Show with Jay Leno and Late Night with David Letterman.

== Personnel ==
On Love Gun

- Gene Simmons – lead vocals, bass guitar, (uncredited) rhythm guitar
- Ace Frehley – lead guitar, backing vocals
- Paul Stanley – rhythm guitar, backing vocals
- Peter Criss – drums, percussion, backing vocals
- Eddie Kramer – piano

On Jigoku-Retsuden

- Gene Simmons – lead vocals, bass guitar
- Tommy Thayer – lead guitar, backing vocals
- Paul Stanley – rhythm guitar, backing vocals
- Eric Singer – drums, backing vocals
- Brian Whelan – (uncredited) piano

== Charts ==
=== Weekly charts ===
Chart (1977)	Peak position
Australian Singles (Kent Music Report)	99
Canada Top Singles (RPM)	22
US Billboard Hot 100	25
US Cash Box Top 100	20

=== Year-end charts ===
Chart (1977)	Peak position
Canada Top Singles (RPM)	164
US (Joel Whitburn's Pop Annual)	155
