= Kiss Alive! 1975–2000 =

Box set by Kiss
- Released: November 21, 2006
- Recorded: 1975–2000
- Genres: Hard rock, heavy metal
- Length: 4:52:00
- Labels: Mercury, Universal
- Producer: Various

Kiss chronology
Kiss Chronicles: 3 Classic Albums (2005)	Kiss Alive! 1975–2000 (2006)	Ikons (2008)

Professional ratings
Review scores
Source	Rating
AllMusic	4/5 stars

Kiss Alive! 1975–2000 is a collection of live recordings from American hard rock band Kiss, released by Universal Music on November 21, 2006.

This box set marks the debut appearance of Kiss' Millennium Concert performance, recorded on December 31, 1999 at BC Place Stadium in Vancouver, Canada. This was originally slated to be released in 2000 as Alive IV. However, after Kiss' parent label, Mercury, was swallowed by the Universal/Vivendi merger, this version of Alive IV was shelved. Universal later agreed to Kiss using the Mercury label for the release, but this project was also shelved indefinitely. Instead, the band released the Kiss Symphony: Alive IV album on Kiss Records/Sanctuary Records in 2003.

The 72-page booklet that comes with this set mistakenly credits songwriting for "Cold Gin" to Paul Stanley instead of Ace Frehley.

Kiss Alive! 1975–2000 won the 2007 Classic Rock Roll of Honours Award for Best Reissue.

== Albums included ==
1. 1975 ~ Alive!
2. 1977 ~ Alive II with bonus track, radio edit version of "Rock and Roll All Nite".
3. 1993 ~ Alive III with bonus track, live version of "Take It Off".
4. 2006 ~ Alive! The Millennium Concert (Intended to have been Alive IV).

== Charts ==
Chart (2006)	Peak position
US Billboard 200	167
