= Love Gun =

- Cover art by Ken Kelly

Studio album by Kiss
- Released: June 17, 1977
- Recorded: May 3 – 28, 1977
- Studios: Record Plant, New York City
- Genres: Hard rock; heavy metal
- Length: 32:53
- Label: Casablanca
- Producers: Kiss; Eddie Kramer

Kiss chronology
Rock and Roll Over (1976)	Love Gun (1977)	Alive II (1977)

Singles from Love Gun
- 1. "Christine Sixteen" Released: June 1, 1977; 2. "Love Gun" Released: July 31, 1977

Professional ratings
Review scores
Source	Rating
AllMusic	4.5/5 stars
Blender	4.5/5 stars
Collector's Guide to Heavy Metal	7/10
The Encyclopedia of Popular Music	3/5 stars
Pitchfork	9.2/10
The Rolling Stone Album Guide	3.5/5 stars
Spin Alternative Record Guide	5/10
Uncut	2/5 stars

Love Gun is the sixth studio album by American hard rock band Kiss, released on June 17, 1977, by Casablanca Records. Casablanca and FilmWorks shipped one million copies of the album on this date. It was certified platinum and became the band's first top 5 album on the Billboard 200. The album was remastered in 1997 and again in 2014. Love Gun is the first Kiss studio album to feature a lead vocal performance from Ace Frehley, thus making it the first to feature lead vocal performances from all four band members.

== Background ==
Before Love Gun was completed, a Gallup poll indicated that Kiss was the most popular band in the United States, beating Aerosmith, Led Zeppelin and the Eagles. On August 26, 27 and 28, 1977, Kiss recorded three shows at the LA Forum for their next release: their second live album, Alive II (1977).

== Composition ==
Paul Stanley has said that "I Stole Your Love" "came quickly. It was influenced in some ways by the Deep Purple song 'Burn'."

The lyrics of Gene Simmons' "Christine Sixteen" have a similar theme to "Goin' Blind" from Hotter than Hell (1974); both songs involve older men lusting after underage girls. It was later sampled by Tone Loc for his 1989 hit single "Funky Cold Medina".

Ace Frehley's "Shock Me" was inspired by an event that took place during Kiss's Rock and Roll Over tour, when Frehley suffered an electric shock. On December 12, 1976, Kiss performed a concert at the Lakeland Civic Center in Lakeland, Florida. During the opening song, Frehley touched an ungrounded metal staircase railing. He was knocked backward, and the concert was delayed for 30 minutes. The show was eventually completed, and Frehley lost feeling in his hand for the remainder of the concert.

"Tomorrow and Tonight" was written to try to recapture the feeling of "Rock and Roll All Nite". A soundcheck recording of the song appears on Alive II.

The title track shares many of its lyrics with "The Hunter", originally recorded by Albert King, a derivation Stanley later acknowledged. Led Zeppelin had also borrowed from the song for "How Many More Times" on their first album. Stanley has stated that "Love Gun" is probably "one of the five signature essential songs" by Kiss and the one he enjoys performing most.

"Plaster Caster" was inspired by Cynthia Plaster Caster, a former groupie famous for casting penises of famous rock musicians, such as Jimi Hendrix.

"Then She Kissed Me" is one of several gender-reversed covers of the Crystals' 1963 single "Then He Kissed Me".

== Recording ==
According to the diary of album engineer Corky Stasiak, Kiss entered the Record Plant to begin recording Love Gun on May 3, 1977, and completed it on May 28th, with their cover of "Then She Kissed Me" being the last song tracked. He also noted that Frehley didn't join the others until May 9, and that many of the basic tracks were completed by Stanley, Simmons and Peter Criss.

Prior to entering the studio, Stanley had made demo recordings of his songs, in which he arranged all of the parts himself, and these were then recreated by the band for the final recordings. Similarly, Eddie and Alex Van Halen played on the demo of Simmons' "Christine Sixteen", and he insisted the band replicate the song note for note, including the lead solo.

"Shock Me" was the first lead vocal that Frehley ever recorded, and he sang it while lying on the floor of the studio. In his autobiography, he states that he originally intended for Stanley or Simmons to sing the song, but they encouraged him to try it himself, with Stanley telling him, "It's way overdue."

Producer Eddie Kramer recalled recording Peter's drums in a hallway. While Simmons is often credited as playing the piano on "Christine Sixteen", Kramer claims he himself played the part, with Gene standing over him, coaching him to "play like a Neanderthal". Stanley played bass guitar on the title track.

== Release ==
Love Gun was released on June 17, 1977.

The album cover was painted by fantasy artist Ken Kelly, who had previously contributed the cover for 1976's Destroyer. A cardboard "Love Gun" (assembly required) was included inside the album, along with a Kiss merchandise order form.

Love Gun was remastered and reissued on CD in 1997 as part of the Kiss Remasters series.

It was remastered and reissued again as a deluxe edition on October 28, 2014, with sleeve notes by Def Leppard's Joe Elliott and a second disc containing demos, live rarities, and a 1977 interview with Gene Simmons. All tracks on the second disc were previously unreleased, bar the demo of "Reputation", which had appeared on the compilation Kiss 40 a few months earlier. The three live tracks were recorded at the Capital Center in Landover, Maryland on December 20, 1977. "The potential for this to be the greatest deluxe edition of all time," noted music writer Geoff Barton, "is ruined by a too-clean remastering job – plus, if truth be told, a track that has dated badly in 'Christine Sixteen'."

== Track listings ==
Side one
No.	Title	Writer(s)	Lead vocals	Length
1.	"I Stole Your Love"	Paul Stanley	Stanley	3:04
2.	"Christine Sixteen"	Gene Simmons	Simmons	3:14
3.	"Got Love for Sale"	Simmons	Simmons	3:29
4.	"Shock Me"	Ace Frehley	Frehley	3:49
5.	"Tomorrow and Tonight"	Stanley	Stanley	3:40

Side two
No.	Title	Writer(s)	Lead vocals	Length
1.	"Love Gun"	Stanley	Stanley	3:18
2.	"Hooligan"	Peter Criss, Stan Penridge	Criss	3:01
3.	"Almost Human"	Simmons	Simmons	2:49
4.	"Plaster Caster"	Simmons	Simmons	3:27
5.	"Then She Kissed Me"	Jeff Barry, Ellie Greenwich, Phil Spector	Stanley	3:02

Deluxe Edition: disc two
No.	Title	Writer(s)	Lead vocals	Length
1.	"Much Too Soon" (demo)	Simmons	Simmons	3:23
2.	"Plaster Caster" (demo)	Simmons	Simmons	3:35
3.	"Reputation" (demo)	Simmons	Simmons	5:39
4.	"Love Gun" (teaching demo)	Stanley		2:14
5.	"Love Gun" (demo)	Stanley	Stanley	3:18
6.	"Gene Simmons Interview 1977"			6:59
7.	"Tomorrow and Tonight" (instrumental demo)	Stanley	Stanley	3:46
8.	"I Know Who You Are" (demo)	Simmons	Simmons	3:09
9.	"Love Gun" (live in 1977)	Stanley	Stanley	3:34
10.	"Christine Sixteen" (live in 1977)	Simmons	Simmons	2:55
11.	"Shock Me" (live in 1977)	Frehley	Frehley	8:21

== Personnel ==
Kiss

- Paul Stanley – vocals, rhythm guitar, bass on "Love Gun", first guitar solo on "I Stole Your Love"
- Gene Simmons – vocals, bass; rhythm guitar on "Christine Sixteen", "Got Love for Sale", "Almost Human" and "Plaster Caster"
- Peter Criss – drums, vocals
- Ace Frehley – lead guitar, vocals, all guitars and bass on "Shock Me", second guitar solo on "I Stole Your Love"

Additional personnel

- Eddie Kramer – piano on "Christine Sixteen", "Tomorrow and Tonight"; keyboards on "I Stole Your Love", "Love Gun"
- Tasha Thomas – backing vocals on "Tomorrow and Tonight"
- Ray Simpson – backing vocals on "Tomorrow and Tonight"
- Hilda Harris – backing vocals on "Tomorrow and Tonight"
- Jimmy Maelin – congas on "Almost Human"

Credits adapted from LP liner notes:

Technical

- Kiss – producers
- Eddie Kramer – producer, engineer
- Corky Stasiak – engineer
- Dennis Woloch – cover and inner sleeve design
- Ken Kelly – cover painting
- David Spindel – sleeve photography

== Charts ==
Chart (1977)	Peak position
Australian Albums (Kent Music Report)	13
Canada Top Albums/CDs (RPM)	3
German Albums (Offizielle Top 100)	18
Japanese Albums (Oricon)	2
Swedish Albums (Sverigetopplistan)	6
US Billboard 200	4

Chart (2025)	Peak position
Greek Albums (IFPI)	65

== Certifications ==
Region	Certification	Certified units/sales
Canada (Music Canada)	Platinum	100,000^{^}
United States (RIAA)	Platinum	1,000,000^{^}
^{^} Shipments figures based on certification alone.

== Bibliography ==
- Leaf, David; Sharp, Ken (2003). KISS: Behind the Mask: The Official Authorized Biography. New York City: Warner Books. ISBN 0-446-53073-5.
