= Shout It Out Loud (Kiss song) =

1976 single by Kiss

Single by Kiss

from the album Destroyer
- B-side: "Sweet Pain"
- Released: March 1, 1976 (US)
- Recorded: Record Plant Studios, New York City: 1976
- Genre: Hard rock
- Length: 2:49
- Label: Casablanca NB-854A (US)
- Songwriters: Paul Stanley, Gene Simmons, Bob Ezrin
- Producer: Bob Ezrin

Kiss singles chronology
"Rock and Roll All Nite (live)" (1975)	"Shout It Out Loud" / "Sweet Pain" (1976)	"Flaming Youth" / "God of Thunder" (1976)

"Shout It Out Loud (live)"

Single by Kiss

from the album Alive II
- B-side: "Nothin' to Lose (Live)"
- Released: January 1978 (US)
- Genre: Hard rock
- Length: 3:15
- Label: Casablanca NB-906 (US)
- Songwriters: Paul Stanley, Gene Simmons, Bob Ezrin
- Producers: Kiss, Eddie Kramer

Kiss singles chronology
"Love Gun" / "I Stole Your Love" (1977)	"Shout It Out Loud (Live)" / "Nothin' to Lose (Live)" (1978)	"Rocket Ride (Edit)" / "Tomorrow and Tonight (live)" (1978)

"Shout It Out Loud" is a song by the American hard rock group Kiss, originally released on their 1976 album, Destroyer. It was released as the lead single off the album, and it proved to be successful, becoming the band's second single to break the Top 40, after "Rock and Roll All Nite". It was also the band's first single to top the charts, as it reached number 1 hit in Canada on May 22, 1976.

== Overview ==
The title of the song was taken from British beat group The Hollies' song "We Want to Shout It Out Loud", which Wicked Lester (pre-Kiss) recorded for their only unreleased album. The song was edited several times for singles and compilation albums. The live version of the song is 12 seconds shorter than the studio due to the last "Shout it, shout it, shout it out loud" line being excluded. The Alive II single, which was described by Billboard magazine as a "raucous rocker" that "catches the excitement and energy of the live show," is 23 seconds shorter than the album song due to the removal of audience chant "We want Kiss". The Killers version is the shortest with the duration of 2:35 as a result of the fade-out of the song starting during the first repetition of the "Shout it, shout it, shout it out loud" lyric following Gene Simmons' "Oh yeah". The version found on Smashes, Thrashes & Hits is 16 seconds longer, as the chorus repeats and the song ends with "Shout it!".

The studio version was released as a single in 1976, as the band and their record company, Casablanca Records, were trying to cash in on the success of their previous single, the live version of "Rock and Roll All Nite", by releasing another anthem. While the song would break into the American Billboard Top 40, peaking at #31, it would prove to not be as successful as its predecessor was but would remain in the band's concert set lists for almost every tour from that point on. In Canada, the single was far more successful, reaching #1 on the RPM national singles chart on May 22, 1976. The song is also one of few to be sung by both Paul Stanley and Gene Simmons. A music video was made for the live version of the song from the 1996 concert in Tiger Stadium, from the Alive/Worldwide Tour. It was directed by Wayne Isham.

Cash Box said that the studio version is "straight ahead rock, complete with power riffs" and that "the vocals are clean and strong." It called the live single version a "show-stopping concert [number], complete with explosion and crazed crowds." Record World said that the studio version "shows the group becoming more musical without losing any of the raw edge that has become their trademark." Record World said of the live version that "The excitement is contagious."

== Legacy ==
"Shout It Out Loud" is widely regarded as one of the band's best songs. In 2014, Paste ranked the song number five on their list of the 20 greatest Kiss songs, and in 2019, Louder Sound ranked the song number 11 on their list of the 40 greatest Kiss songs. It was listed as the 27th single of '76 in Canada.

A 2007 re-recording of the song by the band is featured on the music/rhythm video game Guitar Hero 5. The song is featured in the movie Detroit Rock City and appears on the soundtrack for the movie. The cast of Glee covered the song in the episode "Theatricality". The male part of the group (excluding Kurt Hummel) were also dressed as Kiss members. The song was also featured in a What's New, Scooby-Doo? episode "A Scooby-Doo Halloween". The song was featured in the trailer for the sixth season of the Netflix TV series Cobra Kai.

The song was covered several times. In 1978 by James Last, in 1998 by Pretty Boy Floyd and Zeke. The all-female band Crucified Barbara covered the song in 2006 and Stryper released a cover of the song on their 2011 cover album The Covering. Erik Grönwall, the 2009 winner of the Swedish Idol covered the song on his eponymous debut album. While it was not released as a single, the song charted on Sverigetopplistan, reaching number 49. Grönwall also performed the song on Swedish Idol. It was covered by The Yellow Monkey for the Jigoku no Shōsan: Kiss Tribute in Japan (地獄の賞賛－KISS TRIBUTE IN JAPAN－) album in 1998, Lemmy's cover appears on 2004's Spin the Bottle: An All-Star Tribute to Kiss, Sack Trick with Iron Maiden's Bruce Dickinson covered the song for the 2005 Sheep in KISS Make Up album, and Keri Kelli's cover appears on Lick It Up – A Millennium Tribute to Kiss from 2008. Garth Brooks performed the song at the Kennedy Center Honors in 2025. A biopic film of the same name is set for a 2024 release on Netflix. The number 1 Kiss podcast, Shout It Out Loudcast, takes its name from the song as well. The hosts were going to name the podcast after Shandi, but decided to go with Shout It Out Loud instead.

== Appearances ==
"Shout It Out Loud" has appeared on following Kiss albums:

- Destroyer - studio version
- Alive II - live version
- Killers - edited studio version
- Smashes, Thrashes & Hits - remixed & edited studio version
- Alive III - live video version
- You Wanted the Best, You Got the Best!! - Alive II version
- Greatest Kiss - live version
- The Box Set - Greatest Kiss version
- The Very Best of Kiss - studio version
- Kiss Symphony: Alive IV - live version
- Kiss Instant Live - live version
- Gold - studio version
- Kiss Alive! 1975–2000 - Alive II version and Alive! The Millennium Concert
- Kiss Alive 35 - live version
- Jigoku-Retsuden - re-recorded studio version
- Kiss Sonic Boom Over Europe - live version

== Personnel ==
- Paul Stanley - rhythm guitar, co-lead vocals
- Gene Simmons - bass guitar, co-lead vocals
- Ace Frehley - lead guitar, backing vocals
- Peter Criss - drums, backing vocals

== Charts ==
Kiss

Shout It Out Loud

=== Weekly charts ===
Chart (1976)	Peak position
Australian Singles (Kent Music Report)	45
Canada Top Singles (RPM)	1
New Zealand (Recorded Music NZ)	40
Sweden (Sverigetopplistan)	16
US Billboard Hot 100	31

=== Year-end charts ===
Chart (1976)	Peak position
Canada Top Singles (RPM)	27

Shout It Out Loud (Live)

Chart (1977)	Peak position
Canada Top Singles (RPM)	74
US Billboard Hot 100	54

Erik Grönwall

Chart (1977)	Peak position
Sweden (Sverigetopplistan)	49
