= God of Thunder (song) =

Single by Kiss

from the album Destroyer
- Released: March 15, 1976
- Recorded: Electric Lady Studios, New York City, September 3–6, 1975; Record Plant Studios, New York City, January – February 1976
- Genre: Heavy metal
- Length: 4:13
- Label: Casablanca
- Songwriter: Paul Stanley
- Producer: Bob Ezrin

Kiss singles chronology
"Shout It Out Loud" / "Sweet Pain" (1976)	"Flaming Youth" / "God of Thunder" (1976)	"Detroit Rock City" / "Beth" (1976)

"God of Thunder" is a song by Kiss from their 1976 album Destroyer. The song has also been featured on many of Kiss' live albums, including an up-tempo version on Alive II. Many various sound effects were used to make the song including explosions, clapping, zippers, overdubbed audience chatter and screaming children. The song was written by Paul Stanley, who intended to sing it on the album, but producer Bob Ezrin suggested slowing down the tempo and handing the lead vocals over to Gene Simmons.

== Overview ==
The song is Simmons' "theme song" for the band. It has been performed live with blood-spitting, a bass solo, and a portion of the song being performed by Simmons on a high-rise above the audience.

== Reception ==
"God of Thunder" is widely regarded as one of Kiss's best songs. In 2014, Paste ranked the song number 11 on their list of the 20 greatest Kiss songs, and in 2019, Louder Sound ranked the song number eight on their list of the 40 greatest Kiss songs.

== Releases ==
- Original studio version on Destroyer
- Remixed studio version on Destroyer: Resurrected
- Live version on Alive II
- Live version on Gold
- Alternate studio version on Kiss Killers
- Alternate live version on Kiss Symphony: Alive IV
- Remastered version on Double Platinum
- Another live version on Kiss Alive! 1975-2000 (Best Buy exclusive track)
- Original demo version sung by Paul Stanley on The Box Set
- Original demo version sung by Paul Stanley on Kiss 40
- Unplugged country version on Kissology Volume Three

== Personnel ==
Kiss

- Gene Simmons – bass, lead vocals
- Peter Criss – drums
- Paul Stanley – rhythm guitar
- Ace Frehley – lead guitar

Additional personnel

- Bob Ezrin – keyboards, sound effects
- David Ezrin – voices
- Josh Ezrin – voices

== Cover versions ==
- White Zombie's version appeared on the God of Thunder EP.
- Melvins contributed a cover to the tribute album Hard to Believe: A Kiss Covers Compilation.
- Death recorded a cover for the Japanese release of the album Human.
- Iced Earth included a version on their covers album Tribute to the Gods.
- Entombed included a cover version on their compilation album Sons of Satan Praise the Lord.
