= Shock Me =

Song by Kiss

from the album Love Gun
- Released: June 30, 1977
- Recorded: May 1977
- Genre: Hard rock
- Length: 3:47
- Label: Casablanca Records
- Songwriter: Ace Frehley
- Producer: Eddie Kramer

"Shock Me" is a song by American rock band Kiss that first appeared on their 1977 album Love Gun. It also appears on the B-side of the "Christine Sixteen" single.

It was written by lead guitarist Ace Frehley, who made his lead vocal debut with the track. The song was inspired by an event that took place during Kiss' Rock and Roll Over tour, when he was nearly electrocuted from his electric guitar. It was ranked #43 in Guitar World magazine's "50 Greatest Guitar Solos of All Time".

== Background ==
On December 12, 1976, Kiss performed a concert at the Lakeland Civic Center in Lakeland, Florida. During the opening song, Frehley touched a metal staircase railing, which was ungrounded. He was knocked to the ground, and the concert was delayed for 30 minutes. The show was eventually completed, and Frehley claimed to have lost feeling in his hand for the remainder of the concert.

Frehley presented "Shock Me" to Kiss in completed form. According to Gene Simmons, the rest of the band was not involved in the song's arrangement. Although Frehley had written a number of Kiss songs previously, this was his first time performing lead vocals. The song has since become his "theme song" for the band. Frehley, who was insecure about his singing, recorded his vocals while lying on the floor.

== Live history ==
"Shock Me" was added to Kiss' setlist starting with the Love Gun Tour. Frehley's guitar solo, previously performed during "She" and then "Cold Gin", was added to the song. The song was dropped from the setlist after the 1977–78 Alive II tour. Kiss did not perform the song again until Frehley returned to the group for their 1996–97 Alive/Worldwide Tour. It remained in the group's setlist during the Psycho Circus World Tour, although Frehley's guitar solo was moved to "Into the Void". Since Frehley's departure, Kiss continued to perform the song live with Tommy Thayer on lead vocals until it was dropped from the setlist in 2012 in favor of his song, "Outta This World".

== Reception ==
"Shock Me" is widely considered one of Kiss's best songs. In 2014, Paste ranked the song number ten on their list of the 20 greatest Kiss songs, and in 2019, Louder Sound ranked the song number seven on their list of the 40 greatest Kiss songs.

== Appearances ==
=== Kiss ===
- Love Gun (1977)
- Alive II (1977)
- Greatest Kiss (Japanese version) (1997)
- The Box Set (2001)
- Gold (2005)
- Ikons (2008)
- Kiss Sonic Boom over Europe (2010, with Tommy Thayer on lead vocals)

=== Cover versions ===
- Ace Frehley included a live version on his 1997 12 Picks compilation album.
- Acid Drinkers - Are You a Rebel? (1990) - retitled "Fuck Me", a bonus live track on the 2008 re-release
- Red House Painters – Shock Me EP (1994); Retrospective (1999)
- The opening riff was incorporated into the Buckcherry song "Lit Up" in 1999
- Motorpsycho – Flaming Youth: A Norwegian Tribute to Kiss (1994); Shock Me / Watching You - Motorpsycho Tribute Series (2024)

== Personnel ==
- Ace Frehley – lead vocals, all guitars, bass
- Peter Criss – drums, percussion, backing vocals
- Paul Stanley – backing vocals
