= Calling Dr. Love =

Single by Kiss

from the album Rock and Roll Over
- B-side: "Take Me"
- Released: February 13, 1977 (US)
- Recorded: 1976 at Star Theatre, Nanuet, New York
- Genre: Hard rock; pop rock
- Length: 3:46
- Label: Casablanca NB-880 (US)
- Songwriter: Gene Simmons
- Producer: Eddie Kramer

Kiss singles chronology
| "Hard Luck Woman" / "Mr. Speed" (1976) | "Calling Dr. Love" / "Take Me" (1977) | "Christine Sixteen" / "Shock Me" (1977) |

"Calling Dr. Love" is a song by American rock band Kiss, originally released on their 1976 album Rock and Roll Over.

A live version of the song was included on Alive II, released in 1977. Since then, "Calling Dr. Love" has appeared on numerous Kiss compilation albums. In 2003, it appeared on Kiss's fifth live album, Kiss Symphony: Alive IV. "Calling Dr. Love" was also featured in the setlist of the Alive 35 World Tour in 2008.

The Canadian 8-track tape version of the song is extended by about 55 seconds, with a smoothly edited-in repeat of the guitar solo.

== Background ==
It was written by bassist Gene Simmons, who sings lead vocals on the song, at a Holiday Inn in Evansville, Indiana. The song's title came from Simmons' recollection of The Three Stooges film Men in Black, which contained a hospital intercom announcement, "Calling Doctor Howard, Doctor Fine, Doctor Howard."

== Critical reception ==
Cash Box said that "a hard-driving rhythm line and straightforward vocals combine with Simmons' distinct style to make a top 40 and FM playlist addition." Record World called it a " rocker...in a Humble Pie vein."

American Songwriter placed the song at number 8 on their "Top 10 KISS Essentials … KISSentials?" list and called it "simply irresistible" with "over-the-top production, and glam rock clichés."

== Charts ==
The song was the second single released from the album, and the band's fourth US Top 20 single, reaching #16 in Billboard. In Canada, the song reached number two, and is ranked as the 54th biggest Canadian hit of 1977.

=== Weekly charts ===
| Chart (1977) | Peak position |
|---|---|
| Canada Top Singles (RPM) | 2 |
| US Billboard Hot 100 | 16 |
| US Cashbox Top 100 | 10 |

=== Year-end Charts ===
| Chart (1977) | Peak position |
|---|---|
| Canada Top Singles (RPM) | 54 |
| US Cash Box Top 100 | 75 |
| US Opus | 98 |

== Personnel ==
- Gene Simmons – lead vocals, bass
- Paul Stanley – rhythm guitar
- Peter Criss – drums, backing vocals
- Ace Frehley – lead guitar, additional guitar, backing vocals

== Covers ==
- In 1994, the song was recorded and re-arranged by the one-off supergroup Shandi's Addiction (vocalist Maynard James Keenan, guitarist Tom Morello, bassist Billy Gould, and drummer Brad Wilk) as part of the Kiss tribute album Kiss My Ass: Classic Kiss Regrooved.
- In 1996, the industrial rock band The Electric Hellfire Club covered the song on their album Calling Dr. Luv, renaming the album and song to reflect the name of their keyboardist The Rev. Dr. Luv who had recently died, which the album was dedicated to.
- The punk band Hullabaloo covered the song for the Kiss tribute album Hard to Believe: Kiss Covers Compilation.

== Popular culture ==
- In the film Detroit Rock City, which revolves around Kiss fans, once a character is asked his name after foiling a robbery, he replies "They call me Dr. Love". The song is also played in the film itself.
- The song was released as downloadable content in the music video game Rock Band.
- The song is mentioned - albeit briefly - in The Wastelands, the third installment of Stephen King's epic The Dark Tower.
- The song was used in a 2009 commercial for the cherry-flavored Dr. Pepper. It features Gene Simmons, referred to as "Dr. Love," on a couch with several women, in front of a large electric Kiss logo which flashes while he says that the new product has a "kiss of cherry." His son Nick enters and scolds him for over-emphasizing the word "kiss." The ad ends with Simmons saying "trust me, I'm a doctor!" A variant of this ad aired during Super Bowl XLIV.
- "Calling Dr. Love" was featured in the film Magic Mike.
