= Love Gun (song) =

- cover are from Japanese release

Single by Kiss

from the album Love Gun
- Released: 1977
- Genre: Hard rock; heavy metal
- Length: 3:17
- Label: Casablanca NB-895-AS (US)
- Songwriter: Paul Stanley
- Producers: Eddie Kramer & Kiss

Kiss singles chronology
"Christine Sixteen" / "Shock Me" (1977)	"Love Gun" / "Hooligan" (1977)	"Shout It Out Loud (Live)" / "Nothin' to Lose (Live)" (1977)

"Love Gun" is a song by the American rock band Kiss, first released on their 1977 album of the same name. The B-side is the album track "Hooligan", a song written by drummer Peter Criss.

Paul Stanley, who sings lead vocals on the song, has claimed in several interviews since its release that it is one of his favorite Kiss songs, offering the opinion that "'Love Gun' is quintessential Kiss, and is probably one of the five signature essential Kiss songs."

Stanley has also said that "The Hunter" section of the Led Zeppelin song "How Many More Times" inspired the lyrics of "Love Gun".

Stanley plays bass on the track in addition to singing and playing rhythm guitar. Billboard described it as having a "high energy level" with "power guitar riffs." Cash Box said that it "has cute lyrics, and the army of Kiss admirers should jack it up to respectable chart status." Record World said that it features "hard-edged rock 'n' roll."

"Love Gun" was played on every Kiss tour since its release, and has made numerous appearances on Kiss live albums and compilation albums, despite the fact that it peaked at only no. 61 on the Billboard Hot 100.

The song, and a love of the band itself, is featured heavily in the 2008 adult comedy Role Models, starring Paul Rudd and Seann William Scott and directed by David Wain.

== Personnel ==
- Paul Stanley – lead and backing vocals, rhythm guitar, bass
- Peter Criss – drums, backing vocals
- Ace Frehley – lead guitar, backing vocals
- Eddie Kramer - keyboards

== Charts ==
Chart (1977)	Peak position
Canada Top Singles (RPM)	41
US Billboard Hot 100	61
US Cash Box	55
