= Detroit Rock City =

Single by Kiss

from the album Destroyer
- A-side: "Beth"
- Released: July 28, 1976
- Recorded: 1976
- Studio: Record Plant, New York City
- Genre: Hard rock; heavy metal
- Length: 5:17 (album version); 2:58 (single version); 3:35 (Double Platinum version); 3:45 (Smashes, Thrashes & Hits version)
- Label: Casablanca
- Songwriters: Paul Stanley; Bob Ezrin
- Producer: Bob Ezrin

Kiss singles chronology
"Flaming Youth" / "God of Thunder" (1976)	"Detroit Rock City" / "Beth" (1976)	"Beth" / "Detroit Rock City" (1976)

"Detroit Rock City" is a song by the American hard rock group Kiss, released on their 1976 album Destroyer. The song was written by Paul Stanley and producer Bob Ezrin.

== Background ==
"Detroit Rock City" began with a guitar part by Paul Stanley, who explained: "I had the basic riff of the song, the 'get up, get down' part, but I didn't know what the song was about except it was about Detroit."

The lyrics were based on an actual incident in which a fan was killed in a car accident while on the way to a show. Stanley explained the song's origin further in 2023:

"Detroit Rock City" is an interesting one, because Detroit really embraced us before any other city. We were an opening act everywhere else, and in Detroit we were a headliner. It started as a tribute to Detroit, and then it kind of took a left turn, because we played Charlotte once, and somebody coming to the arena was killed in an accident. And I thought how bizarre that somebody on their way to something so life affirming loses their life. So there's a juxtaposition in that song about singing about how great Detroit is, and actually about someone going to the show who doesn't make it.

Bassist Gene Simmons played an R&B-influenced bassline, which he considered a departure from his usual style. The song opens with a radio report and producer Bob Ezrin incorporated car sound effects throughout.

Allmusic critic Donald A. Guarisco praised the song's energy and the "anthemic pull" of the chorus. He also noted the song's "complex arrangement" with a "jazzy, fast-paced shuffle beat", guitar power chords and "fluid, melodic bass line". Stanley and Ace Frehley also have opportunities to show off during several guitar breaks, including a "Spanish-flavored guitar break at the song's midpoint" that Guarisco particularly praised.

In 2014, Paste ranked the song number three on their list of the 20 greatest Kiss songs, and in 2019, Louder Sound ranked the song number one on their list of the 40 greatest Kiss songs.

== Personnel ==
Kiss

- Paul Stanley – lead vocals, rhythm guitar
- Gene Simmons – bass, backing vocals
- Ace Frehley – lead guitar
- Peter Criss – drums

Additional personnel

- Bob Ezrin – spoken word and keyboards

== Charts ==
Chart (1976)	Peak position
Canada Top Singles (RPM)	99
