= The Very Best of Kiss =

Greatest hits album by Kiss
- Released: August 27, 2002
- Recorded: 1974–1991
- Genres: Hard rock; rock
- Length: 75:09
- Labels: Mercury; UTV
- Producer: Bill Levenson

Kiss chronology
Psycho Circus (1998)	The Very Best of Kiss (2002)	Kiss Symphony: Alive IV (2003)

Professional ratings
Review scores
Source	Rating
AllMusic	4/5 stars
Rolling Stone	3/5 stars

The Very Best of Kiss is a compilation album by the American rock band Kiss. It was released on August 27, 2002. It contains 21 of the band's most popular tracks, all previously released, with original versions.

== Track listing ==
No.	Title	Writer(s)	Lead vocals, Original album	Length
1.	"Strutter"	Paul Stanley, Gene Simmons	Paul Stanley, Kiss (1974)	3:13
2.	"Deuce"	Simmons	Gene Simmons, Kiss	3:06
3.	"Got to Choose"	Stanley	Stanley, Hotter Than Hell (1974)	3:56
4.	"Hotter Than Hell"	Stanley	Stanley, Hotter Than Hell	3:31
5.	"C'mon and Love Me"	Stanley	Stanley, Dressed To Kill (1975)	2:59
6.	"Rock and Roll All Nite" (live)	Stanley, Simmons	Simmons, Alive! (1975)	4:04
7.	"Detroit Rock City" (remix)	Stanley, Bob Ezrin	Stanley, Double Platinum (1978); originally from Destroyer (1976)	3:36
8.	"Shout It Out Loud"	Stanley, Simmons, Ezrin	Stanley & Simmons, Destroyer (1976)	2:50
9.	"Beth"	Peter Criss, Ezrin, Stan Penridge	Peter Criss, Destroyer	2:48
10.	"I Want You"	Stanley	Stanley, Rock and Roll Over (1976)	3:06
11.	"Calling Dr. Love"	Simmons	Simmons, Rock and Roll Over	3:46
12.	"Hard Luck Woman"	Stanley	Criss, Rock and Roll Over	3:34
13.	"I Stole Your Love"	Stanley	Stanley, Love Gun (1977)	3:05
14.	"Christine Sixteen"	Simmons	Simmons, Love Gun	3:14
15.	"Love Gun"	Stanley	Stanley, Love Gun	3:18
16.	"New York Groove"	Russ Ballard	Ace Frehley, Ace Frehley (1978)	3:03
17.	"I Was Made for Lovin' You"	Stanley, Desmond Child, Vini Poncia	Stanley, Dynasty (1979)	4:31
18.	"I Love It Loud"	Vinnie Vincent, Simmons	Simmons, Creatures of the Night (1982)	4:17
19.	"Lick It Up"	Vincent, Stanley	Stanley, Lick It Up (1983)	3:58
20.	"Forever"	Stanley, Michael Bolton	Stanley, Hot in the Shade (1989)	3:52
21.	"God Gave Rock & Roll To You II"	Stanley, Simmons, Ezrin, Ballard	Stanley & Simmons, Revenge (1992)	5:19

== Personnel ==
Kiss

- Paul Stanley – vocals, rhythm guitar, intro guitar solo (5), first guitar solo on (10, 13), bass (15, 17)
- Gene Simmons – vocals, bass; rhythm guitar (14)
- Peter Criss – drums, vocals
- Ace Frehley – lead guitar; rhythm guitar and bass (16), vocals
- Eric Carr – drums and backing vocals (18–20), backing vocals (21)
- Vinnie Vincent – lead guitar (18–19)
- Bruce Kulick – lead guitar (20–21), bass and acoustic guitar solo (20)
- Eric Singer – drums (21)

Additional personnel
Not credited, but do appear

- Anton Fig – drums (16–17)
- Dick Wagner – acoustic guitar (9)
- Vini Poncia – keyboards and backing vocals (17)
- Eddie Kramer – keyboards (13–15)
- Phil Ashley – keyboards (20)

== Charts ==
=== Weekly charts ===
Chart (2002–10)	Peak position
Finnish Albums (Suomen virallinen lista)	25
German Albums (Offizielle Top 100)	80
Mexican Albums (Top 100 Mexico)	94
Norwegian Albums (VG-lista)	16
Swedish Albums (Sverigetopplistan)	30
US Billboard 200	52
US Top Hard Rock Albums (Billboard)	22
US Top Pop Catalog (Billboard)	29

=== Year-end charts ===
Chart (2002)	Position
Canadian Metal Albums (Nielsen SoundScan)	56

== Certifications ==
Region	Certification	Certified units/sales
Argentina (CAPIF)	Gold	20,000^{^}
United States (RIAA)	Gold	500,000^{^}
^{^} Shipments figures based on certification alone.
