= The Millennium Collection: The Best of Kiss =

Greatest hits album by Kiss
- Released: August 5, 2003
- Recorded: 1973–1979
- Genre: Hard rock
- Length: 41:25
- Labels: Mercury; Universal

Kiss chronology
Kiss Symphony: Alive IV (2003)	The Millennium Collection: The Best of Kiss (2003)	The Best of Kiss, Volume 2: The Millennium Collection (2004)

Professional ratings
Review scores
Source	Rating
AllMusic	3/5 stars
Rolling Stone	3/5 stars

The Millennium Collection: The Best of Kiss is a compilation album that collects the 1970s output by the American rock band Kiss. It was released by Universal Music as part of their 20th Century Masters - The Millennium Collection series. It is the first of a trilogy of albums in the Millennium Collection series featuring material from Kiss. The second volume, which covers material from the 1980s output was released in 2004, followed by the 1990s output third installment in 2006.

== Track listing ==
No.	Title	Writer(s)	Original Album	Length
1.	"Strutter"	Paul Stanley, Gene Simmons	Kiss	3:13
2.	"Deuce"	Simmons	Kiss	3:06
3.	"Hotter Than Hell"	Stanley	Hotter Than Hell	3:31
4.	"C'mon and Love Me"	Stanley	Dressed to Kill	2:59
5.	"Rock and Roll All Nite" (live in 1975)	Stanley, Simmons	Alive!	4:04
6.	"Detroit Rock City" (single version)	Stanley, Bob Ezrin	Destroyer	3:39
7.	"Beth"	Peter Criss, Ezrin, Stan Penridge	Destroyer	2:48
8.	"Hard Luck Woman"	Stanley	Rock and Roll Over	3:34
9.	"Calling Dr. Love"	Simmons	Rock and Roll Over	3:46
10.	"Love Gun"	Stanley	Love Gun	3:18
11.	"Christine Sixteen"	Simmons	Love Gun	3:14
12.	"I Was Made for Lovin' You"	Stanley, Vini Poncia, Desmond Child	Dynasty	4:31

== Personnel ==
Kiss

- Paul Stanley – vocals, rhythm guitar, intro guitar solo on "C'mon and Love Me", 12-string acoustic guitar on "Hard Luck Woman"; bass on "Love Gun" and "I Was Made for Lovin' You"
- Gene Simmons – vocals, bass; rhythm guitar on "Christine Sixteen"
- Peter Criss – drums, vocals
- Ace Frehley – lead guitar, acoustic guitar on "Hard Luck Woman", backing vocals

Additional musicians

- Anton Fig – drums on "I Was Made for Lovin' You"
- Vini Poncia – keyboards and backing vocals on "I Was Made for Lovin' You"
- Bob Ezrin – piano on "Beth"
- Dick Wagner – acoustic guitar on "Beth"
- Eddie Kramer – keyboards on "Love Gun" and "Christine Sixteen"

== Charts ==
Chart (2003)	Peak position
US Billboard 200	132

== Certifications ==
Region	Certification	Certified units/sales
United States (RIAA)	Gold	500,000^{^}
^{^} Shipments figures based on certification alone.
