= Ikons =

Kiss Ikons

Box set by Kiss
- Released: October 21, 2008
- Genre: Hard rock
- Labels: Mercury; Universal Music Group

Kiss chronology
Kiss Alive! 1975–2000 (2006)	Kiss Ikons (2008)

Booklet cover

Kiss Ikons is a four-CD box set featuring material recorded by the original members of the American hard rock band Kiss. It was released in 2008 by Universal Music Group.

== Background ==
Each CD in the set is named after one of the original group members (which contain songs that they wrote/sing on), created by long-time Kiss fan Paul "DJ Flare" Hall and co-produced with Jeff Fura. In 1996, the 'Kiss-Icons' logos were created by Ajax Garcia, a famous Los Angeles-based artist. Garcia is known as a founding member of the 1990s punk group The Napoleon Blownaparts.

== Critical reception ==
Professional ratings
Review scores
Source	Rating
AllMusic	3.5/5 stars

Gordon S. Miller writing for Blogcritics said: "There's nothing new for members of the KISS Army and it's a poor introduction to new listeners." AllMusic wrote: "True fans have all of this material and could arrange it any way they want, but Ikons saves them the trouble of generating their own member specific playlists, which in all likelihood, would only be slightly better."

== Track listing ==
Disc 1 (Red): The Demon
No.	Title	Writer(s)	Original Release	Length
1.	"God of Thunder"	Paul Stanley	Destroyer, 1976	4:16
2.	"Almost Human"	Gene Simmons	Love Gun, 1977	2:50
3.	"Calling Dr. Love"	Simmons	Rock and Roll Over, 1976	3:46
4.	"Ladies Room"	Simmons	Rock and Roll Over	3:29
5.	"Christine Sixteen"	Simmons	Love Gun	3:14
6.	"Deuce"	Simmons	KISS, 1974	3:05
7.	"Rock and Roll All Nite"	Stanley, Simmons	Dressed To Kill, 1975	2:49
8.	"Cold Gin"	Ace Frehley	KISS	4:22
9.	"Parasite"	Frehley	Hotter Than Hell, 1974	3:04
10.	"Larger Than Life"	Simmons	Alive II, 1977	4:02
11.	"Love 'Em and Leave 'Em"	Simmons	Rock and Roll Over	3:48
12.	"Plaster Caster"	Simmons	Love Gun	3:28
13.	"Radioactive"	Simmons	Gene Simmons, 1978	3:53
14.	"Charisma"	Simmons, Howard Marks	Dynasty, 1979	4:28

Disc 2 (Purple): The Star Child
No.	Title	Writer(s)	Original Release	Length
1.	"Detroit Rock City"	Stanley, Bob Ezrin	Destroyer	5:19
2.	"Love Gun"	Stanley	Love Gun	3:17
3.	"Take Me"	Stanley, Sean Delaney	Rock and Roll Over	2:57
4.	"Strutter"	Stanley, Simmons	KISS	3:11
5.	"C'mon and Love Me"	Stanley	Dressed To Kill	2:55
6.	"Hotter Than Hell"	Stanley	Hotter Than Hell	3:22
7.	"100,000 Years"	Stanley, Simmons	KISS	3:24
8.	"Rock Bottom"	Frehley, Stanley	Dressed To Kill	3:56
9.	"Do You Love Me?"	Stanley, Kim Fowley, Ezrin	Destroyer	3:34
10.	"All American Man"	Stanley, Delaney	Alive II	3:14
11.	"Mr. Speed"	Stanley, Delaney	Rock and Roll Over	3:20
12.	"I Stole Your Love"	Stanley	Love Gun	3:05
13.	"Wouldn't You Like to Know Me"	Stanley	Paul Stanley, 1978	3:19
14.	"I Was Made for Lovin' You"	Stanley, Vini Poncia, Desmond Child	Dynasty	4:31

Disc 3 (Blue): Space Ace
No.	Title	Writer(s)	Original Release	Length
1.	"New York Groove" (Hello cover)	Russ Ballard	Ace Frehley, 1978	3:03
2.	"Shock Me"	Frehley	Love Gun	3:48
3.	"2000 Man" (Rolling Stones cover)	Mick Jagger, Keith Richards	Dynasty	4:56
4.	"Rocket Ride"	Frehley, Delaney	Alive II	4:08
5.	"Snow Blind"	Frehley	Ace Frehley	3:57
6.	"Speedin' Back to My Baby"	Frehley, Jeanette Frehley	Ace Frehley	3:37
7.	"Talk to Me"	Frehley	Unmasked, 1980	4:03
8.	"What's on Your Mind"	Frehley	Ace Frehley	3:28
9.	"Rip It Out"	Frehley, Larry Kelly, Sue Kelly	Ace Frehley	3:42
10.	"Save Your Love"	Frehley	Dynasty	4:42
11.	"Hard Times"	Frehley	Dynasty	3:32
12.	"Two Sides of the Coin"	Frehley	Unmasked	3:18
13.	"Dark Light"	Frehley, Anton Fig, Lou Reed, Simmons	Music From "The Elder", 1981	4:21
14.	"Into the Void"	Frehley, Karl Cochran	Psycho Circus, 1998	4:24

Disc 4 (Green): The Cat Man
No.	Title	Writer(s)	Original Release	Length
1.	"Hard Luck Woman"	Stanley	Rock and Roll Over	3:35
2.	"Baby Driver"	Peter Criss, Stan Penridge	Rock and Roll Over	3:40
3.	"Hooligan"	Criss, Penridge	Love Gun	3:02
4.	"Beth"	Criss, Penridge, Ezrin	Destroyer	2:47
5.	"I Can't Stop the Rain"	Delaney	Peter Criss, 1978	4:28
6.	"Black Diamond"	Stanley	KISS	5:13
7.	"Mainline"	Stanley	Hotter Than Hell	3:52
8.	"Don't You Let Me Down"	Criss, Penridge	Peter Criss	3:43
9.	"Dirty Livin'"	Criss, Penridge	Dynasty	4:28
10.	"Getaway"	Frehley	Dressed To Kill	2:45
11.	"Strange Ways"	Frehley	Hotter Than Hell	3:20
12.	"That's The Kind of Sugar Papa Likes"	Criss, Penridge	Peter Criss	3:04
13.	"Easy Thing"	Criss, Penridge	Peter Criss	3:56
14.	"I Finally Found My Way"	Stanley, Ezrin	Psycho Circus	3:42

== Charts ==
Chart (2008)	Peak position
Swedish Albums (Sverigetopplistan)	42
