= Kiss Alive 35 =

Live album by Kiss
- Released: 2008–2009
- Recorded: May 30, 2008
- Venue: Stockholms Stadion, Stockholm, Sweden
- Genre: Hard rock; heavy metal

Kiss chronology
Jigoku-Retsuden (2008)	Kiss Alive 35 (2008)	Sonic Boom (2009)

Alternative cover
- Cover released to support the 2nd leg of the Sonic Boom Over Europe Tour

Kiss Alive 35 is a series of 2 CD live albums, each containing a recording of the complete set from a European show on the KISS Alive/35 World Tour from 2008. The second set of recordings from the North American leg of this tour was released in 2009.

== Album information ==
The discs are recorded and distributed through Concert Live. There is a limited run of 1500 CDs for each recorded show. The setlists differ slightly between shows, but they are mostly made up of tracks from their 1975 live album, Alive!. This is the first album cover to feature Tommy Thayer and Eric Singer in Kiss makeup. All of the Alive 35 albums are now out of print. Some of the compilations are sold out as well.

A second North American leg of the tour was planned for Fall/Winter 2009. These shows were available as well, much like the Concert Live discs, except they were released by Concert Online. They are available on a 2-CD set as well as on an exclusive leather wristband USB flash drive in 320 kbps MP3 format. The CD cover features all four current members in their new costumes, which had debuted at the start of this leg of the tour. The tracklist for this leg, in addition to including many songs from the previous Alive 35 shows, also includes some songs from their 2009 studio album Sonic Boom.

== Track listing ==
While the tracklist does differ by the show and the 2 CDs may be split in different spots, most of the albums feature the following songs:

=== CD 1 ===
No.	Title	Writer(s)	Lead Vocals	Length
1.	"Deuce"	Gene Simmons	Gene Simmons
2.	"Strutter"	Paul Stanley, Simmons	Paul Stanley
3.	"Got to Choose"	Stanley	Stanley
4.	"Hotter Than Hell"	Stanley	Stanley
5.	"Nothin' To Lose"	Simmons	Eric Singer
6.	"C'mon and Love Me"	Stanley	Stanley
7.	"Parasite"	Ace Frehley	Simmons, Singer
8.	"She"	Simmons, Stephen Coronel	Simmons, Stanley, Singer
9.	"100,000 Years"	Stanley, Simmons	Stanley
10.	"Let Me Go, Rock 'n' Roll"	Stanley, Simmons	Simmons

=== CD 2 ===
No.	Title	Writer(s)	Lead vocals	Length
1.	"Black Diamond"	Stanley	Singer, intro by Stanley
2.	"Rock and Roll All Nite"	Stanley, Simmons	Simmons
3.	"Shout It Out Loud"	Stanley, Simmons, Bob Ezrin	Stanley, Simmons
4.	"Cold Gin"	Frehley	Simmons
5.	"Lick It Up"	Stanley, Vinnie Vincent	Stanley
6.	"I Love It Loud"	Simmons, Vincent	Simmons
7.	"I Was Made for Lovin' You"	Stanley, Vini Poncia, Desmond Child	Stanley
8.	"Love Gun"	Stanley	Stanley
9.	"Detroit Rock City"	Stanley, Ezrin	Stanley

The second leg of the tour has seemingly eliminated "I Was Made for Lovin' You" in favor of "Modern Day Delilah" and has also added "Watchin' You" to the standard setlist. For several dates, starting with the show in Montreal on October 1, the opener was "King of the Night Time World", and "Nothin’ To Lose" was dropped in favor of "I Stole Your Love". In Greenville, South Carolina, "Calling Dr. Love" and "Shock Me" was added to the setlist, taking the place of "C'Mon and Love Me" and "Got To Choose".

== Personnel ==
- Paul Stanley – vocals, rhythm guitar
- Gene Simmons – vocals, bass
- Eric Singer – drums, vocals
- Tommy Thayer – lead guitar, vocals
- Mike "Spike" Rush – The Introduction "Voice"
