= Double Platinum (Kiss album) =

Greatest hits album by Kiss
- Released: April 1978
- Recorded: 1973–1978
- Genres: Hard rock; heavy metal
- Length: 69:45
- Label: Casablanca
- Producers: Kiss and Sean Delaney (album and "Strutter '78"), Kenny Kerner, Richie Wise, Neil Bogart, Eddie Kramer, and Bob Ezrin (original recordings)

Kiss chronology
Alive II (1977)	Double Platinum (1978)	Dynasty (1979)

Singles from Double Platinum
- 1. "Strutter '78" Released: April 1978

Double Platinum is the first greatest hits album by the American hard rock band Kiss, released in 1978. Many of the songs on Double Platinum were remixed and differed from their original versions: in the case of "Strutter," it was re-recorded with a slight disco beat and dubbed "Strutter '78." Other songs ("Hard Luck Woman," "Detroit Rock City") had sections completely removed, while the beginning of "Black Diamond" was repeated at the end, fading out at the start of the first verse and giving the song a "wrap around" feel.

The Japanese single release of "Strutter '78" includes a different version to that on the album: faster and shorter, with an altered guitar solo, plus a more prominent hi-hat (cymbal) sound throughout.

== Release and reception ==
Professional ratings
Review scores
Source	Rating
AllMusic	4.5/5 stars
Collector's Guide to Heavy Metal	5/10
Encyclopedia of Popular Music	3/5 stars
Pitchfork	6.0/10
The Rolling Stone Album Guide	4/5 stars
Spin Alternative Record Guide	8/10
Uncut	4/5 stars

The original vinyl release, in a gatefold sleeve, had an embossed, silver-foiled sleeve, with the band members in bas-relief inside. The album was packaged with a printed "Platinum Award" thanking the Kiss Army for making the band a "Double Platinum Success". Later reissues would retain the gatefold sleeve but replaced the logo with a printed, red-type version and the band members were now represented inside by photos rather than the base illustrations. When the album was remastered for CD in the US in 1997, it mimicked the original vinyl.

The album was certified Platinum on May 16, 1978, by the RIAA. In Canada, it was certified Gold on June 1, 1978, after shipping 50,000 copies. The album is one of the band's best catalog sellers, with 522,000 copies sold from 1991 to March 2012 only. It has been speculated that US sales have reached double platinum level (with at least 478,000 sold between 1978 and 1991), however it has not been re-certified since 1978.

Stephen Thomas Erlewine of AllMusic writes: "If 'Strutter' was represented by the original version, instead of a pointless 1978 remake—which was recorded only to entice collectors into buying an album of music they already owned—Double Platinum would have been a definitive collection, but as it stands, it's simply a very, very good overview."

Rolling Stone writes "Kiss's greatest-hits collections have all been conspicuously incomplete as if it hates the idea of anyone buying just one Kiss album, but Double Platinum is the most solid, though not as much fun as Alive!"

== Track listing ==
All credits adapted from the original release.

Side one
No.	Title	Writer(s)	Length
1.	"Strutter '78"	Paul Stanley, Gene Simmons	3:43
2.	"Do You Love Me?"	Stanley, Kim Fowley, Bob Ezrin	3:32
3.	"Hard Luck Woman" (remix)	Stanley	3:23
4.	"Calling Dr. Love" (remix)	Simmons	3:20
5.	"Let Me Go, Rock 'n' Roll"	Stanley, Simmons	2:15

Side two
No.	Title	Writer(s)	Length
6.	"Love Gun"	Stanley	3:17
7.	"God of Thunder"	Stanley	4:14
8.	"Firehouse" (remix)	Stanley	3:20
9.	"Hotter Than Hell"	Stanley	3:30
10.	"I Want You"	Stanley	3:02

Side three
No.	Title	Writer(s)	Length
11.	"Deuce" (remix)	Simmons	3:02
12.	"100,000 Years" (remix)	Stanley, Simmons	3:24
13.	"Detroit Rock City" (remix)	Stanley, Ezrin	3:35
14.	""Rock Bottom" (intro)/"She" (remix)	Ace Frehley / Simmons, Stephen Coronel	5:27
15.	"Rock and Roll All Nite"	Stanley, Simmons	2:48

Side four
No.	Title	Writer(s)	Length
16.	"Beth"	Peter Criss, Stan Penridge, Ezrin	2:45
17.	"Makin' Love"	Stanley, Sean Delaney	3:12
18.	"C'mon and Love Me" (remix)	Stanley	2:54
19.	"Cold Gin"	Frehley	4:22
20.	"Black Diamond" (remix)	Stanley	4:14

== Personnel ==
Kiss

- Paul Stanley – vocals, rhythm guitar, first guitar solo (track 10), guitar solo (track 18), 12-string acoustic guitar (tracks 3, 10 and 20), bass (track 6)
- Gene Simmons – vocals, bass
- Peter Criss – drums, vocals
- Ace Frehley – lead guitar, acoustic guitar (tracks 3, 14 and 18), backing vocals

Additional personnel

- Bob Ezrin – keyboards (tracks 7 and 16)
- Dick Wagner – acoustic guitar (track 16)
- New York Philharmonic – orchestra (track 16)
- Eddie Kramer – keyboards (track 6)
- Warren Dewey – fire engine sound effects (track 8)

Production

- Sean Delaney and Mike Stone – remixing of all tracks at Trident Studios, London, England
- Jimmy Ienner – executive producer

== Charts ==
Chart (1978)	Peak position
Australian Albums (Kent Music Report)	17
Canada Top Albums/CDs (RPM)	15
Japanese Albums (Oricon)	19
New Zealand Albums (RMNZ)	19
US Billboard 200	22

Chart (2019)	Peak position
German Albums (Offizielle Top 100)	26

== Certifications ==
Region	Certification	Certified units/sales
Australia (ARIA)	Gold	20,000^{^}
Canada (Music Canada)	Gold	50,000^{^}
United States (RIAA)	Platinum	1,000,000^{^}
^{^} Shipments figures based on certification alone.
