= Let Me Go, Rock 'n' Roll =

Single by Kiss

from the album Hotter Than Hell
- B-side: "Hotter than Hell"
- Released: October 22, 1974 (US)
- Recorded: The Village Recorder Studios, Los Angeles; August 1974
- Genre: Hard rock; proto-punk
- Length: 2:15
- Label: Casablanca NB-823 (US)
- Songwriters: Gene Simmons, Paul Stanley
- Producers: Kenny Kerner & Richie Wise

Kiss singles chronology
"Strutter" (1974)	"Let Me Go, Rock 'n' Roll" (1974)	"Rock and Roll All Nite" (1975)

"Let Me Go, Rock 'n' Roll" is a song by American rock band Kiss, released in 1974 as the only single from their second studio album Hotter Than Hell. The song failed to chart, but is a staple of the band's live concerts.

== Background ==
"Let Me Go, Rock 'n' Roll" is one of the few Kiss songs in which lyrics were written before the music. It was based on a riff Paul Stanley had been working on. The song was demoed for inclusion on the band's self-titled debut album. Despite not being on the album, it was performed on the supporting Kiss Tour.

== Composition ==
The original song title was "Baby, Let Me Go" but was soon changed by producer Kenny Kerner to "Rock 'n' Roll" before finally being titled "Let Me Go, Rock 'n' Roll". Gene Simmons penned the lyrics during a lunch break at his day job, and the song conveys romantic excitement: "Cause baby's got the feeling, baby wants a show, baby won't you tell me, baby rock 'n' roll, yeah, yeah!"

== Critical reception ==
Record World described the song as "heavy metal heaven," adding it's "puckered up with all the electricity essential for it to explode." AllMusic wrote: ""Let Me Go, Rock 'n' Roll" is one of the most entertaining rockers in the Kiss catalog, a fun, fast tune that feels like a dry run for the pop-metal perfection of "Rock and Roll All Nite.""

== Live performances ==
Kiss have played this song live since their early days and it ended their encores until the American leg of the Destroyer Tour, when it was replaced by "Black Diamond" and later "Rock and Roll All Nite". It was excluded during the Love Gun Tour, but came back for the Alive II and Dynasty tours. Except for a club performance on September 8, 1993, the song was not played live from 1980 to 1995. It was returned to the setlist for the Reunion Tour. It was left out on the Rock the Nation Tour, but returned on the Alive 35 Tour and has been played ever since. When performed live, the song has often been extended to nearly five minutes due to guitar and bass solos.

== Album appearances ==
- Hotter Than Hell – studio version
- Alive! – live version
- The Originals – studio version
- Double Platinum – studio version
- The Box Set – demo version
- Kiss Symphony: Alive IV – live version
- Gold – studio version
- Kiss Chronicles: 3 Classic Albums – studio version
- Kiss Alive! 1975–2000 – Alive! version
- Kiss Alive 35 – live version

== Track listing ==
No.	Title	Writer(s)	Length
1.	"Let Me Go, Rock 'N' Roll"		2:16
2.	"Hotter than Hell"	Stanley	3:30
Total length:			5:46

== Personnel ==
- Gene Simmons – lead vocals, bass
- Paul Stanley – rhythm guitar, backing vocals
- Peter Criss – drums
- Ace Frehley – lead guitar
