= Cecil Holmes =

Cecil Holmes may refer to:

- Cecil Holmes (music executive), co-founder of Casablanca Records and a founder of Chocolate City Records
- Cecil Holmes (director) (1921–1994), New Zealand-born film director and writer
