= Larry Harris (music executive) =

American music industry executive (1947–2017)

- Born: Larry Alan Harris; May 31, 1947; Brooklyn, New York, U.S.
- Died: December 18, 2017 (aged 70); Port Angeles, Washington, U.S.
- Occupations: Record producer, music executive
- Spouse: Mary Candice Hill (m. 1975)
- Children: 2

Larry Alan Harris (May 31, 1947 – December 18, 2017) was executive vice president and co-founder of Casablanca Records, with his cousin Neil Bogart, Cecil Holmes, and Buck Reingold.

== Biography ==
Born in Brooklyn, Harris, began working for Neil Bogart, who was his second cousin, at Buddah/Kama Sutra Records in the summer of 1971 as their local New York promotions man. By 1973, Bogart was feeling creatively stifled at Buddah Records, so he secured financing and distribution through Warner Bros. Records and started his own label, Casablanca Records, basing it in Los Angeles later that year. Bogart thought Harris had a good ear for rock music and offered him a stake in the company if he was willing to move to California. He followed Bogart, and along with Cecil Holmes, and Buck Reingold started the new label in August 1973. Harris initially headed up the Rock Music division and followed Bogart to Los Angeles later the same year.

Casablanca's first major signing in 1973 was a new band called Kiss. The label would eventually sign many famous artists including Donna Summer, Parliament, Cher, and the Village People. The label struggled for the first couple of years and at one stage, after being dropped by Warner Brothers in later 1974 and becoming an independent label, Casablanca was so financially distressed that Bogart travelled to Las Vegas and cashed in his casino line of credit to make the company's payroll.

Casablanca's financial fortunes changed with the success of KISS Alive, the band's 1975 live recording, which stayed on the charts for 110 weeks and has sold nine million copies. The label changed names to Casablanca Records and Filmworks and successfully branched out into film with movies such as The Deep and Midnight Express.

Harris was instrumental in the success of recording artists like Kiss, where he masterminded many successful marketing strategies aimed at increasing their reach, such as radio concerts, buying radio airtime, and calling in favours with radio station music directors, He was also instrumental in marketing campaigns that successfully brought many other Casablanca artists significant publicity and brand awareness, which at times also included strategies like the manipulation Billboard Hot 100 charts and having staff buy multiple copies of popular magazines and vote for Casablanca acts in reader polls.

In 1977, Polygram purchased 50% of Casablanca for $15 million, from which Harris received 8.5%. Bogart and Harris were not fans of the change in company culture following the Polygram investment. Firstly, while they worked extremely hard, Casablanca had a relaxed, shoot-from-the-hip, anti-corporate feel, where cocaine and Quaaludes were openly used, whereas Polygram was the highly corporate antithesis of this. Secondly, in Casablanca, most senior positions were held by people of Jewish ancestry and Polygram had brought in many German staff, one of whom bragged about being a U-boat commander during WWII, which didn't foster cohesiveness within the group. Polygram, who had become increasingly worried about the lax spending habits within Casablanca began cutting back on staff, closely looking over shoulders, and doing their best to implement a change in culture to more match their own. Bogart and Harris became so disillusioned with the new culture that they would "show up at board meetings in New York tripping on Quaaludes".

By 1979, after some commercial failures, such as the four Kiss solo albums which shipped five million units and initially sold only two million, and with the popularity of many of their disco oriented artists waning, Polygram demanded further cost cutting and staffing cutbacks. While Bogart had the final say about which staff were to be cut, when the cuts actually happened, he offered his condolences to the laid off staff and feigned ignorance of the situation, leaving Harris looking like the bad guy responsible for them losing their jobs. Following further incidents that led him to believe Bogart's character had changed for the worse, Harris wrote, "I was depressed. I was deeply affected by the changes I saw in Neil and by what I was discovering about the character he was becoming. He believed his own publicity, the publicity we had created, and that was the most dangerous thing you could do. The stunning, bold-faced lie he had told Bruce and me had crippled our relationship, and I no longer saw a future for myself at Casablanca". Harris quit Casablanca on July 23, 1979.

Overall, Harris worked for Casablanca from August 1973 until July 1979, rising to become the company's senior vice-president and then managing director in 1976.

After leaving Casablanca Records in 1979, Harris landed in Seattle where he owned and operated the Seattle Improv for a number of years.

Harris died in Port Angeles on December 18, 2017, and was survived by his wife, Candy, daughter Emily and son Morgan.

== Bibliography ==
- Harris, Larry; Gooch, Curt; Suhs, Jeff (2009). And Party Every Day: The Inside Story Of Casablanca Records. Backbeat Books. ISBN 978-0879309824.
