= Rock and Roll All Nite =

1975 single by Kiss

- US single of live version recording

Single by Kiss

from the album Dressed to Kill and Alive!
- B-side: "Getaway" (single version); "Rock and Roll All Nite" (7" live version)
- Released: April 2, 1975 (US); October 14, 1975 (7" live version)
- Recorded: February 1975; May 16, 1975 (7" live version)
- Studio: Electric Lady Studios, New York City
- Genre: Hard rock; arena rock
- Length: 2:49 (album version); 2:34 (single version); 3:20 (7" live version)
- Label: Casablanca NB-829 (US)
- Songwriters: Paul Stanley, Gene Simmons
- Producers: Neil Bogart & Kiss

Kiss singles chronology
| "Let Me Go, Rock 'n' Roll" (1974) | "Rock and Roll All Nite" (1975) | "C'mon and Love Me" (1975) |
| "C'mon and Love Me" (1975) | "Rock and Roll All Nite (Live)" (1975) | "Shout It Out Loud" (1976) |

Promo video
- "Rock and Roll All Nite" on YouTube

Live video
- "Rock and Roll All Nite" from Kiss eXposed on YouTube

Audio
- "Rock and Roll All Nite" (studio version) on YouTube
- "Rock and Roll All Nite" (live in Detroit, 1975) on YouTube
- "Rock and Roll All Nite" from MTV Unplugged (1996) on YouTube

"Rock and Roll All Nite" is a song by American rock band Kiss, released in 1975 as the first single from their third studio album Dressed to Kill. The studio version of the song peaked at No. 68 on the Billboard singles chart, besting the band's previous charting single, "Kissin' Time" (#89). A subsequent live version, released as a single in October 1975, eventually reached No. 12 in early 1976, the first of six Top 20 songs for Kiss in the 1970s. "Rock and Roll All Nite" became Kiss's signature song and has served as the group's closing concert number in almost every concert since 1976.

In 2015, "Sleazegrinder" of Louder included the song in his list of "The 20 Greatest Hair Metal Anthems Of All Time", placing it at number 5.

== Recording ==
"Rock and Roll All Nite" was written by Paul Stanley and Gene Simmons while Kiss was still in Los Angeles, as part of their Hotter than Hell Tour. However, during the group's concert at Cobo Hall in Detroit on January 26, 1976, Stanley introduced it as a song that was written in and for Detroit. The tour ended early (February 1975), when Casablanca Records founder and president Neil Bogart ordered Kiss to return to the studio to record a follow-up to Hotter Than Hell, which had stalled on the charts and failed to meet Casablanca's sales expectations. One of Bogart's instructions to the band was to compose an anthem, something he felt the band needed. The song itself was inspired by the Slade song "Mama Weer All Crazee Now".

They wrote the pre-chorus, Stanley wrote the chorus, and Simmons wrote the verses, borrowing parts of a song he had previously written, entitled "Drive Me Wild". The song was one of two the group recorded toward the end of the Hotter than Hell Tour prior to returning to Electric Lady Studios for the proper Dressed to Kill recording sessions. For the choruses, the band and Bogart brought in a large group of outside contributors to sing and clap, including members of the Kiss road crew, studio musicians, and Peter Criss's wife Lydia. Some of the road crew used their jacket zippers to create sound.

== Reception ==
Cash Box said that "the undulating beat and anthem-like quality of the chorus add up to a satanic hit" and that it opens with "pounding drums and a ferocious guitar roar." Record World said that the "group allows their drummer and vocals to take control of the moment as they get down to r&r basics with the best of 'em."

Kiss' version appears in a 2022 TV commercial for Applebee's. In 2008, it was named the 16th greatest hard rock song of all time by VH1. In 2021, it was listed at No. 404 on Rolling Stone's "500 Greatest Songs of All Time".

== Live performances ==
While "Rock and Roll All Nite" would eventually become a fixture in Kiss's live performances, it was not inserted into the band's setlist immediately, nor did it immediately replace "Let Me Go, Rock 'n' Roll" as the closing number. The ending of the live version of "Rock and Roll All Nite" is taken from "Getaway" (which, as indicated above, was released as the single's B-side). Kiss performed the song during the closing ceremonies for the 2002 Winter Olympics in Salt Lake City which proved to be Ace Frehley's final performance with Kiss. They also performed the song live with Adam Lambert during the season 8 finale of American Idol, on May 20, 2009, at the Nokia Theater in Los Angeles.

On December 31, 2019, this song was performed on The 70th NHK Red & White Year-End Song Festival featuring X Japan's drummer/pianist Yoshiki.

== Other versions ==
The original version of the song, as it appears on Dressed To Kill, does not have a guitar solo, while many later versions do have one. The Kiss Unplugged version features Ace Frehley and Bruce Kulick sharing the solo. The Unplugged version was released as a single and reached number 13 on Billboard's Mainstream Rock Tracks. The original version also ends while fading away; all live versions end with the last notes of another Dressed to Kill song, "Getaway" (which, as indicated above, was released as the studio-version single's B-side). The chorus of Alive!'s version of the song is played at the beginning of "Detroit Rock City", from 1976's Destroyer.

Kiss collaborated with Japanese girl group Momoiro Clover Z on the single "Yume no Ukiyo ni Saite Mi na", consisting of the title track and a version of "Rock and Roll All Nite".

Dr. Teeth and the Electric Mayhem covered the song for the first episode of the 2023 series The Muppets Mayhem and its soundtrack.

== Album appearances ==
- Dressed to Kill (1975) – original studio version
- Alive! (1975) – live version
- The Originals (1976) – studio version
- Double Platinum (1978) – studio version
- Killers (1982) – live version
- Smashes, Thrashes & Hits (1988) – remixed studio version
- Chikara (1988)
- Alive III (1993) – live version
- Kiss Unplugged (1996) – acoustic live version
- You Wanted the Best, You Got the Best!! (1996) – live version from Alive!
- Greatest Kiss (1997) – studio version
- The Box Set (2001) – studio version and live version
- The Very Best of Kiss (2002) – live version from Alive!
- Kiss Symphony: Alive IV (2003) – live version with the Melbourne Symphony Orchestra
- The Best of Kiss: The Millennium Collection (2003) – live version from Alive! (album re-released in 2010 as ICON)
- Gold (2005) – live version from Alive!
- Kiss Chronicles: 3 Classic Albums (2006) – studio version
- Kiss Alive! 1975–2000 (2006) – live version from The Box Set
- Kiss Chronicles – original studio version (as part of repackaging of Dressed To Kill)
- Alive IIm³ – release of Alive!, Alive II, Alive III, plus Alive! The Millennium Concert – single edit version
- Kiss Klassics (2008) – re-recorded version included on a bonus CD with Sonic Boom
- Ikons (2008) – studio version
- Kiss Alive 35 (2009) – live album produced at each of the venues
- Kiss Sonic Boom Over Europe (2010) – live versions
- Kiss 40 (2014) – live version from Alive!

== Personnel ==
- Gene Simmons – lead vocals, bass guitar
- Paul Stanley – rhythm guitar, backing vocals
- Ace Frehley – lead guitar, backing vocals
- Peter Criss – drums, backing vocals

== Charts ==
=== Weekly charts ===
Studio version

| Chart (1975) | Peak position |
|---|---|
| Canada Top Singles (RPM) | 74 |
| US Billboard Hot 100 | 68 |
| US Cash Box Top 100 | 57 |

Live version

| Chart (1975–1976) | Peak position |
|---|---|
| Australian Singles (Kent Music Report) | 18 |
| Canada Top Singles (RPM) | 13 |
| US Billboard Hot 100 | 12 |
| US Cash Box Top 100 | 17 |

=== Year-end charts ===
| Chart (1976) | Peak position |
|---|---|
| Australian Singles (Kent Music Report) | 60 |
| Canada Top Singles (RPM) | 126 |
| US Billboard Hot 100 | 96 |

== Certifications ==
| Region | Certification | Certified units/sales |
|---|---|---|
| Brazil (Pro-Música Brasil) | Gold | 30,000^{‡} |
| Spain (Promusicae) | Gold | 30,000^{‡} |
| United Kingdom (BPI) | Silver | 200,000^{‡} |
^{‡} Sales+streaming figures based on certification alone.

== Poison version ==
"Rock and Roll All Nite"

Single by Poison

from the album Less than Zero
- Released: October 12, 1987
- Recorded: 1987
- Genre: Glam metal
- Label: Def Jam Recordings/CBS Records (original release); Enigma/Capitol Records (subsequent releases)
- Songwriter: Stanley/Simmons
- Producer: Rick Rubin

Poison singles chronology
| "I Won't Forget You" (1987) | "Rock and Roll All Nite" (1987) | "Nothin' but a Good Time" (1988) |

Audio
- "Rock and Roll All Nite" by Poison on YouTube

American rock band Poison covered and released "Rock and Roll All Nite" as a single from the soundtrack to the film Less than Zero in 1987. It was then released on a Poison album The Best of Poison: 20 Years of Rock in 2006 and again on the cover album Poison'd in 2007.

At the start of the "Nothin' But a Good Time" music video, Poison's rendition of "Rock and Roll All Nite" is heard on the radio.

=== Personnel ===
- Bret Michaels – vocals, rhythm guitar
- Bobby Dall – bass
- Rikki Rockett – drums
- C.C. DeVille – lead guitar
