= C'mon and Love Me =

- cover art from German release

Single by Kiss

from the album Dressed to Kill
- B-side: "Getaway"
- Released: April 2, 1975 (US)
- Genre: Hard rock
- Length: 2:57
- Label: Casablanca NB-873A (US)
- Songwriter: Paul Stanley
- Producers: Neil Bogart & Kiss

Kiss singles chronology
"Rock and Roll All Nite" (1975)	"C'mon and Love Me" (1975)	"Rock and Roll All Nite (live)" (1975)

"C'mon and Love Me" is a song by the American rock band Kiss, released in 1975 as the second and final single from their third studio album Dressed to Kill.

== Background ==
Written by Paul Stanley in under an hour, the track also appears in a live version on Alive!. Stanley was inspired by the Moody Blues song "Question" when composing the tune.

Allmusic critic Donald A. Guarisco described the song as a "playful narrative portraying a Don Juan who takes the unique tack of offering himself up to his romantic prey: 'Baby, baby don't you hesitate/'Cause I just can't wait/Lady, won't you take me down to my knees/You can do what you please/C'mon and Love Me.'" The singer also asks to be dominated with lines such as "Take me down to my knees/You can do what you please".

== Reception ==
"C'mon and Love Me" did not chart upon release but became a concert favorite in the 1970s.

Cash Box said that "with ingenious lyrics, written from the sleazier side of being a rock star, Paul Stanley has written a blazing, high-energy rocker that illustrates why this group enjoys the fanatic, dedicated coterie it does."

In 2014 Paste magazine rated "C'mon and Love Me" as Kiss' 18th best song, calling it a "straight rock ‘n’ roller" and calling the line "She’s a dancer, a romancer / I’m a Capricorn and she’s a Cancer" one of Stanley's greatest. In 2019, Classic Rock rated it Kiss' 15th best song, calling it "a cult fan favourite that still goes down a storm live."

Skid Row covered the song on B-Side Ourselves in 1992.

== Appearances ==
The song has appeared on the following Kiss issues:

- Dressed to Kill - original studio version
- Alive! - live version
- Kiss Unplugged longform video - live version
- Kiss Alive 35 - live version
- The Originals - studio version
- Double Platinum - remixed studio version
- The Box Set - Alive! version
- The Very Best of Kiss - studio version
- The Best of Kiss: The Millennium Collection - studio version
- Gold - studio version
- Kiss Chronicles: 3 Classic Albums - studio version
- Kiss Alive! 1975–2000 - Alive! version
- Ikons - studio version

== Personnel ==
- Paul Stanley – lead vocals, rhythm guitar, intro guitar solo
- Gene Simmons – bass, backing vocals
- Peter Criss – drums, backing vocals
- Ace Frehley – acoustic guitar, guitar solo
