= Strutter =

1974 single by Kiss

Single by Kiss

from the album Kiss
- B-side: "100,000 Years"
- Released: August 10, 1974 (US)
- Recorded: 1973
- Studio: Bell Sound (New York City)
- Genre: Hard rock; glam rock
- Length: 3:10
- Label: Casablanca; Warner Bros. (US) NB-9001
- Songwriters: Gene Simmons; Paul Stanley
- Producers: Kenny Kerner; Richie Wise

Kiss singles chronology
"Kissin' Time" (1974)	"Strutter" (1974)	"Let Me Go, Rock 'n' Roll" (1974)

"Strutter" is a song by American rock band Kiss, originally from their self-titled debut album, released in 1974. It was the third and final single released from the album, and failed to chart. Despite this, the song is a staple of the band's live concerts, and appears on many Kiss live and compilation albums. The song was featured in the video games Grand Theft Auto: San Andreas and Guitar Hero 2.

== Composition and lyrics ==
"Strutter" is one of the few Kiss songs written by Gene Simmons and Paul Stanley together. Stanley wrote new lyrics to "Stanley the Parrot," a song whose music was composed by Simmons. It combines a Rolling Stones-styled groove with a glam rock style as it pairs syncopated, ascending verse melodies with a two-note chorus that ends in a shout of the song's title. The lyrics, based on the well-dressed vixens the band saw in the streets of New York, show a Bob Dylan influence.

== Critical reception ==
"Strutter" is widely considered one of Kiss's best songs. Cash Box said that "this may be their most dynamic [rock 'n' roll song] to date" and has "lots of bass and guitar, along with those power driven vocals here, all making for a great single release." Record World called it "pleasurably pompous rock in the best style and tradition of hard, boogie-gaited music." In 2014, Paste ranked the song number two on their list of the 20 greatest Kiss songs, and in 2019, Louder Sound ranked the song number five on their list of the 40 greatest Kiss songs.

== Appearances ==
"Strutter" has appeared on the following Kiss albums:

- Kiss – studio version
- Alive! – live version
- The Originals – studio version
- Smashes, Thrashes & Hits – remixed & edited studio version
- Greatest Kiss – studio version
- The Box Set – demo version
- The Very Best of Kiss – studio version
- Kiss Symphony: Alive IV – live version
- The Best of Kiss: The Millennium Collection – studio version
- Gold – studio version
- Kiss Chronicles: 3 Classic Albums – studio version
- Kiss Alive! 1975–2000 – Alive! version
- Kiss Alive 35 – live version
- Ikons – studio version

== Track listing ==
No.	Title	Writer(s)	Length
1.	"Strutter"	Paul Stanley, Gene Simmons	3:10
2.	"100,000 Years"	Stanley, Simmons	3:22
Total length:			6:32

== Personnel ==
- Paul Stanley – lead vocals, rhythm guitar
- Gene Simmons – bass, backing vocals
- Peter Criss – drums, backing vocals
- Ace Frehley – lead guitar

== Strutter '78 ==
"Strutter '78"

Single by Kiss

from the album Double Platinum
- B-side: "Shock Me (Live)"
- Released: April 28, 1978 (US)
- Recorded: 1978
- Studio: Electric Lady, New York City
- Genre: Hard rock; disco-rock
- Length: 3:19
- Label: Casablanca
- Songwriters: Gene Simmons; Paul Stanley
- Producers: Kiss and Sean Delaney

Kiss singles chronology
"Rocket Ride (Edit)" (1978)	"Strutter '78" (1978)	"I Was Made for Lovin' You" (1979)

"Strutter '78", a re-recording of the song, was released in 1978 as the only single from the compilation album Double Platinum. A softer and more danceable take on the song, fans credit it for starting the band's "disco era". More successful than the original song, it reached No. 89 on the Australian Kent Music Report charts, but was only rereleased in 2014, on the greatest hits album Kiss 40.

=== Composition ===
"Strutter '78" is the first of four disco flirtations by Kiss, the others being "I Was Made for Lovin' You", "Sure Know Something" and "Dirty Livin'". Casablanca Records executive Neil Bogart, who was having success with Donna Summer, the Village People and other disco acts, wanted a softer and more danceable take on the song. On top of adding a subtle but noticeable disco beat, there's an additional guitar solo.

=== Release ===
Like its predecessor, "Strutter '78" also failed to chart in the US, though Double Platinum, which featured remixed versions of eight other songs, reached No. 22 on the Billboard 200 and was certified platinum. The single version is faster and shorter than its album counterpart with an altered guitar solo and a more prominent hi-hat (cymbal) sound throughout.

=== Critical reception ===
"Strutter '78" was seen as unnecessary by critics, and accused by fans for ushering in the band's "disco era." AllMusic critic Stephen Thomas Erlewine labeled the song a "pointless remake which was recorded only to entice collectors into buying an album of music they already owned."

Gene Simmons, on the topic of the re-recording in Guitar World's September 1996 issue, remarks "I look back at that and think, 'why?'", adding he feels "the original version is the classic and the best."

=== Appearances ===
"Strutter '78" has appeared on the following Kiss albums:

- Double Platinum – re-recorded version
- Kiss 40 – re-recorded version

=== Track listing ===
7" Single
No.	Title	Writer(s)	Length
1.	"Strutter '78"	Stanley, Simmons	3:41
2.	"Shock Me" (Live)	Ace Frehley	4:17
Total length:			7:36

7" EP
No.	Title	Writer(s)	Length
1.	"Strutter '78"	Stanley, Simmons	3:41
2.	"Let Me Go, Rock 'n' Roll"	Stanley, Simmons	2:15
3.	"Love Gun"	Stanley	3:27
4.	"Beth"	Peter Criss, Stan Penridge, Bob Ezrin	2:45
Total length:			12:08

=== Personnel ===
- Paul Stanley – vocals, rhythm guitar
- Gene Simmons – bass, backing vocals
- Peter Criss – drums, backing vocals
- Ace Frehley – lead guitar

=== Charts ===
Chart (1978)	Peak position
Australian Singles (Kent Music Report)	89

== Covers ==
- Extreme covered the song on the Kiss My Ass: Classic Kiss Regrooved album (1994)
- The Donnas covered the song for the Detroit Rock City soundtrack (1999)
- Vitamin String Quartet covered the song for the String Quartet Tribute to Kiss album (2004)
- Electric Six covered the song in their covers album, Streets of Gold (2021)
