= Cecil Holmes (music executive) =

American record executive (born 1937)

Cecil Holmes (born July 29, 1937) is an American record executive who was a co-founder of Casablanca Records and a founder of Chocolate City Records. Born in New York, New York, Holmes began his career in the music businesses as a member of a Brooklyn "doo-wop" group in the early 1950s before transitioning to record promotion with Colpix Records, a division of Columbia Pictures. Holmes began a long-term relationship with Neil Bogart while working together at Cameo-Parkway Records, Kama Sutra Records, and Buddah Records before co-founding Casablanca. After Casablanca had been sold, Holmes moved to Columbia/CBS Records as Vice President of East Coast A&R and Executive Producer.

== Cavaliers and Fi-Tones ==
In 1952, Holmes, Ron Moseley, Ron Anderson, and Lowe Murray formed the Cavaliers Quartet, singing on street corners. When Anderson left for the Army, Lloyd Davis and Gene Redd joined and the new group continued as the Fi-Tones. After signing a contract with Atlas Record, the high school buddies had several regional hits – Foolish Dreams, It Wasn’t a Lie, and I belong to You and performed the first of many shows at the Apollo Theatre in Harlem. Holmes joined another group – The Solitaires – after high school, touring with them throughout the East Coast for a year.

== Record promotion and production ==
Holmes' first job in the record portion was with Colpix Records handling promotions in New York City. With his success developing strong relations with the disc jockeys at Black audience powerhouse radio stations WWRL and WLIB, Mercury Records recruited Holmes to be its East Coast Regional Manager of Promotions. His first promotional hit was Mustang Sally by Sir Mack Rice[i] (later covered by Wilson Pickett).

Less than a year later, Cameo Parkway Records recruited Holmes to be the National Director of Promotions for R&B where he met Neil Bogart handling Pop record promotions. Less than six months later, Bogart was promoted to Vice President and General Manager. When Cameo was sold, the two friends left to run Buddah Records, a new record label owned by Kama Sutra Records.

As Vice President of Buddah Records, Holmes signed the Impressions and curated an impressive roster of R&B acts, with million-sellers by the Edwin Hawkins Singers ("Oh Happy Day"), the Five Stairsteps ("Ooh Child"), and Gladys Knight & the Pips, whose Buddah debut Imagination (1973) marked a career resurgence with their chart-topping "Midnight Train to Georgia." While at Buddah, Holmes also produced two albums, Music for Soulful Lovers (1973) and The Black Motion Picture Experience (1973).

== Casablanca Records ==
In 1974, Bogart, Holmes, Larry Harris, and Buck Reingold founded Casablanca Records. Holmes was Senior Vice President, working closely with the company’s major talents. He was also President of Chocolate City Records, a label under the Casablanca brand. Casablanca became one of the most successful American labels of the 1970s. Remarkably, the former Buddah executivest had taken Casablanca from the brink of bankruptcy to a $100 million a year operation in less than five years.

Their artists included Cameo, Donna Summer, Kiss, Parliament, and The Village People.

In 1980, the co-founders sold their interest in Casablanca to Polygram. After the sale, Bogart started Boardwalk Records before dying of cancer in 1982 at age 39. Holmes joined CBS Records, promoting top acts like Earth, Wind & Fire, Mtume, and Luther Vandross. He assisted in the production of Michael Jackson’s Thriller sessions. Holmes signed New Kids on the Block to their first record contract. He was the executive producer of their second album Hangin' Tough (1988), which sold more than 14 million copies worldwide.

== Industry awards ==
- Gavin Report's "Promotion Man of the Year" several years in a row
- Billboard Magazine’s "Promotion Man of the Year" in 1973
- Billboard's "One of Tomorrow's 200 Top Executives" Award (1976)
- New York City Black Radio's "Executive of the Year" Award (1976)
- National Association of Television & Radio Announcers (NATRA) "Executive of the Year" Award (1976)
- Black Radio Exclusive's "Executive of the Year" Award (1979)
