= Hotter than Hell (Kiss song) =

Song by Kiss

from the album Hotter than Hell
- Released: October 22, 1974
- Recorded: August 1974
- Genre: Hard rock
- Length: 3:30
- Label: Casablanca Records
- Songwriter: Paul Stanley
- Producers: Kenny Kerner, Richie Wise

"Hotter than Hell" is a song by the American hard rock band Kiss, released on their second album of the same name in 1974. It was written by the band's rhythm guitarist Paul Stanley, and displays the heavy influence of the band Free. It has also appeared as a B-side to the album's lone single, "Let Me Go, Rock 'n' Roll".

== Background ==
"Hotter than Hell", as Stanley has stated, was basically a rewrite of the Free song "All Right Now", due to the fact that Stanley was a big fan of Free and the song meant a lot to him.

Stanley described the story of the song: "[It] was written about an encounter with somebody in a bar, and then at the end of the song I didn't know quite how to end it so I came up with this riff that was kind of like a Black Sabbath kind of riff and we tacked that on."

== Live performances ==
"Hotter than Hell" has been performed during the following tours, but was dropped from the Destroyer Tour setlist and did not return until the Revenge Tour in 1992. The song was returned again to the setlist for the Kiss/Aerosmith co-headlined Rocksimus Maximus Tour/World Domination Tour. It was again dropped from the Sonic Boom Over Europe Tour and has not been performed since.

During the TV movie Kiss Meets the Phantom of the Park, the "evil" Kiss performed a version of the song, retitled "Rip and Destroy", in order to incite a crowd to riot.

== Reception ==
AllMusic called the song "a gutsy rocker full of pile-driving riffs" and said it includes "[...] a stomping chorus that uses a killer stuttering hook to underline the phrase "hot, hot, hotter than hell.""

== Appearances ==
"Hotter than Hell" has appeared on the following Kiss albums:

- Hotter than Hell - studio version
- Alive! - live version
- The Originals - studio version
- Double Platinum - studio version
- The Box Set - studio version
- The Very Best of Kiss - studio version
- The Best of Kiss: The Millennium Collection - studio version
- Gold - studio version
- Kiss Chronicles: 3 Classic Albums - studio version
- Kiss Alive! 1975–2000 - Alive! version
- Kiss Alive 35 - live version
- Jigoku-Retsuden - re-recorded studio version
- Ikons - studio version
- Sonic Boom (Bonus CD: Compilation Kiss Klassics) - re-recorded studio version

Other appearances:

- B-side for the "Let Me Go, Rock 'n' Roll" single

== Personnel ==
- Paul Stanley – lead vocals, rhythm guitar
- Gene Simmons – bass, backing vocals
- Peter Criss – drums
- Ace Frehley – lead guitar
