= Kiss Symphony: Alive IV =

Live album by Kiss
- Released: July 22, 2003 (2-disc edition); October 7, 2003 (single-disc edition)
- Recorded: February 28, 2003
- Venue: Marvel Stadium
- Genres: Hard rock, symphonic rock
- Length: 1:36:15
- Labels: Kiss; Sanctuary

Kiss chronology
The Very Best of Kiss' (2002)	Kiss Symphony: Alive IV (2003)	The Millennium Collection: The Best of Kiss (2003)

Kiss Symphony: Alive IV is the fifth live album by American rock band Kiss, performing with the Melbourne Symphony Orchestra (MSO) released in 2003. The arrangements were made by David Campbell, who also conducted the MSO. It is the group's fourth album in the Alive series and first release under Kiss Records and Sanctuary Records.

== Album information ==
The concert from which the album is taken featured original Kiss members Peter Criss, Paul Stanley, and Gene Simmons. All three appeared at a press conference announcing the show. "The result will be no less than a symphonic sonic boom," promised Stanley. "Beethoven and Mozart will rise up dancing with fists raised as we unleash a spectacle that will be both classic and classical. This time it's black tie and black leather." Members of the Melbourne Symphony Orchestra who accompanied Kiss during this performance wore Kiss makeup and tuxedos.

Although Stanley said, "We're hoping Ace will be at this spectacular concert," guitarist Frehley once again left the band. The show instead introduced new member Tommy Thayer as the "Spaceman". The resultant album was Kiss's last to feature Criss – who would leave the band officially in 2004, to be replaced once again by Eric Singer. Singer had previously rejoined the band to replace Criss in 2001 after the band's first Farewell Tour.

In 2000, Kiss had planned to release the original Alive IV (featuring the reunited original lineup), but this was nixed by label politics and contracts. The artwork was revealed and its version of "Rock and Roll All Nite" was added to The Box Set, but the album was shelved. The band moved labels from Universal/Island to Sanctuary Music and issued Kiss Symphony: Alive IV. The original Alive IV belatedly appeared – as Alive! The Millennium Concert – in a 2006 box set of all the Alive albums, Kiss Alive! 1975–2000.

10,000 limited numbered copies were released on vinyl in the US.

Unlike past Alive releases, the songs on the album appear in the order they were performed, with the concert split into three acts. In Act One, Kiss performed six songs by themselves. In Act Two, they performed a five-song acoustic set with the Melbourne Symphony Ensemble. Act Three featured the band and the full 60-piece orchestra on all tracks.

The live versions of "Rock and Roll All Nite", "God of Thunder" and "Lick It Up" were featured on the soundtrack of the 2003 video game Tony Hawk's Underground. The game also featured a bonus level, entitled "Hotter Than Hell", which takes place where the performance was done in Melbourne. A performance of "God of Thunder" was featured as an extra feature in the game, and even Gene Simmons himself could be unlocked as a playable character complete with his own special move.

== Reception ==
Professional ratings
Review scores
Source	Rating
AllMusic	2.5/5 stars

David Jeffries of AllMusic called the addition of Thayer to the band "just one of the disappointments on an album dragged down by a muddy mix and under-rehearsed interaction of band and orchestra" and "[something] a 60-piece orchestra can't make up for." He also believed that the voice of Simmons "[was] an embarrassment," particularly in the song "Goin' Blind".

== Track listing ==
All tracks were recorded at Marvel Stadium (known at the time as Telstra Dome) in Melbourne, Australia on February 28, 2003.

=== 2-disc edition ===
==== Disc one ====
Act One – Kiss
No.	Title	Writer(s)	Lead vocals	Length
1.	"Deuce"	Gene Simmons	Simmons	4:14
2.	"Strutter"	Paul Stanley, Simmons	Stanley	3:22
3.	"Let Me Go, Rock 'n' Roll"	Stanley, Simmons	Simmons	6:09
4.	"Lick It Up"	Vinnie Vincent, Stanley	Stanley	5:13
5.	"Calling Dr. Love"	Simmons	Simmons	3:30
6.	"Psycho Circus"	Stanley, Curtis Cuomo	Stanley	5:13

Act Two – Kiss With the Melbourne Symphony Ensemble
No.	Title	Writer(s)	Lead vocals	Length
7.	"Beth"	Peter Criss, Stan Penridge, Bob Ezrin	Criss	3:41
8.	"Forever"	Stanley, Michael Bolton	Stanley	3:50
9.	"Goin' Blind"	Simmons, Stephen Coronel	Simmons	3:38
10.	"Sure Know Something"	Stanley, Vini Poncia	Stanley	4:20
11.	"Shandi"	Stanley, Poncia	Stanley	3:39

==== Disc two ====
Act Three – Kiss With the Melbourne Symphony Orchestra
No.	Title	Writer(s)	Lead vocals	Length
1.	"Detroit Rock City"	Stanley, Ezrin	Stanley	4:43
2.	"King of the Night Time World"	Stanley, Ezrin, Kim Fowley, Mark Anthony	Stanley	3:30
3.	"Do You Love Me?"	Stanley, Ezrin, Fowley	Stanley	4:10
4.	"Shout It Out Loud"	Simmons, Stanley, Ezrin	Simmons, Stanley	4:10
5.	"God of Thunder"	Stanley	Simmons	4:27
6.	"Love Gun"	Stanley	Stanley	4:26
7.	"Black Diamond"	Stanley	Criss, intro by Stanley	7:11
8.	"Great Expectations" (featuring the Australian Children's Choir)	Simmons, Ezrin	Simmons	4:20
9.	"I Was Made for Lovin' You"	Stanley, Desmond Child, Poncia	Stanley	5:00
10.	"Rock and Roll All Nite"	Simmons, Stanley	Simmons	7:20

=== Single-disc edition ===
Act One – Kiss
No.	Title	Writer(s)	Lead vocals	Length
1.	"Deuce"	Gene Simmons	Simmons	4:14
2.	"Lick It Up"	Vinnie Vincent, Stanley	Stanley	4:13
3.	"Calling Dr. Love"	Simmons	Simmons	3:30

Act Two – Kiss With the Melbourne Symphony Ensemble
No.	Title	Writer(s)	Lead vocals	Length
4.	"Beth"	Peter Criss, Stan Penridge, Bob Ezrin	Criss	3:41
5.	"Goin' Blind"	Simmons, Stephen Coronel	Simmons	3:38
6.	"Shandi"	Stanley, Poncia	Stanley	3:39

Act Three – Kiss With the Melbourne Symphony Orchestra
No.	Title	Writer(s)	Lead vocals	Length
7.	"Detroit Rock City"	Stanley, Ezrin	Stanley	4:43
8.	"King of the Night Time World"	Stanley, Ezrin, Kim Fowley, Mark Anthony	Stanley	3:30
9.	"Do You Love Me?"	Stanley, Ezrin, Fowley	Stanley	4:10
10.	"Shout It Out Loud"	Simmons, Stanley	Simmons, Stanley	4:10
11.	"God of Thunder"	Stanley	Simmons	4:27
12.	"Love Gun"	Stanley	Stanley	4:26
13.	"Black Diamond"	Stanley	Criss, intro by Stanley	7:11
14.	"Great Expectations" (featuring the Australian Children's Choir)	Simmons, Ezrin	Simmons	4:20
15.	"Rock and Roll All Nite"	Simmons, Stanley	Simmons	7:20
16.	"Do You Remember Rock 'n' Roll Radio?" (bonus track)	Joey Ramone	Simmons, Stanley	3:35

== Personnel ==
Members

- Paul Stanley – vocals, rhythm guitar
- Gene Simmons – vocals, bass
- Peter Criss – drums, vocals
- Tommy Thayer – lead guitar, backing vocals

Additional personnel

- The Melbourne Symphony Orchestra
- Mark Opitz – producer
- Tony Wall – engineer
- David Campbell – composer

== Charts ==
Chart (2003)	Peak position
Australian Albums (ARIA)	14
Austrian Albums (Ö3 Austria)	39
Canadian Albums (Billboard)	10
Dutch Albums (Album Top 100)	40
Finnish Albums (Suomen virallinen lista)	30
French Albums (SNEP)	70
German Albums (Offizielle Top 100)	15
Italian Albums (FIMI)	66
Japanese Albums (Oricon)	84
Norwegian Albums (VG-lista)	5
Portuguese Albums (AFP)	28
Scottish Albums (Official Charts)	97
Swedish Albums (Sverigetopplistan)	23
Swiss Albums (Schweizer Hitparade)	28
UK Independent Albums (Official Charts)	10
UK Rock & Metal Albums (Official Charts)	11
US Billboard 200	18

== Certifications ==
Region	Certification	Certified units/sales
Canada (Music Canada)	Gold	50,000^{^}
^{^} Shipments figures based on certification alone.
