= Alive! (Kiss album) =

Live album by Kiss
- Released: September 10, 1975
- Recorded: May 16, 1975 (Cobo Arena, Detroit); June 21, 1975 (Cleveland Music Hall, Cleveland); July 20, 1975 (RKO Orpheum Theater, Davenport); July 23, 1975 (Wildwoods Convention Center, Wildwood)
- Studio: Electric Lady (New York City)
- Genres: Hard rock; heavy metal
- Length: 72:35
- Label: Casablanca
- Producer: Eddie Kramer

Kiss chronology
Dressed to Kill (1975)	Alive! (1975)	Destroyer (1976)

Singles from Alive!
- 1. "Rock and Roll All Nite" Released: October 14, 1975

Alive! is the first live album by American hard rock band Kiss, released on September 10, 1975. It is considered to be their breakthrough, and a landmark for live albums. The double-album contains live versions of selected tracks from their first three studio albums, Kiss, Hotter Than Hell and Dressed to Kill. It was recorded at concerts in Detroit, Michigan; Cleveland, Ohio; Wildwood, New Jersey; and Davenport, Iowa on May 16, June 21, July 20 and 23, 1975.

The album's title was an homage to the 1972 live album Slade Alive! by the English rock group Slade, a band that heavily influenced Kiss.

== Background ==
From 1974 to 1975, Kiss released three albums: Kiss, Hotter Than Hell, and Dressed to Kill. Although the three albums helped establish a cult following for the band in the Rust Belt, they were commercial failures. Guitarist Paul Stanley attributed the low sales to Kiss' weak sound when they were in the studio versus when they were in concert. According to Stanley: "I never thought any of our first three albums captured the intensity of what the band was going for or was. And it was a problem because people would come to see us and many of them weren't buying our albums." Kiss was famous for its elaborate stage performances, where the band members would wear kabuki-style makeup, use pyrotechnics, and spit fake blood. Bassist Gene Simmons said that because of Kiss's notoriety, they were kicked off of multiple tours with groups like Argent, Black Sabbath, and Savoy Brown because they were afraid to play after Kiss.

Kiss's record label, Casablanca Records, had similar financial issues. By 1974, Casablanca's profits were declining, so CEO Neil Bogart decided to release a double album of audio highlights from The Tonight Show Starring Johnny Carson, a show that averaged fourteen million viewers a night. Casablanca shipped 750,000 copies, but the album was an enormous failure. Distributors mailed back their free copies, and Casablanca co-founder Larry Harris said: "It hit the floor with a lifeless, echoing thud." The failure negatively affected many acts signed with Casablanca, including Kiss; the band received only a $15,000 advance for the first three albums, and had yet to receive any royalties. As a result of the breach of contract, Kiss began looking at other labels to sign with, and a lawsuit was eventually filed against Bogart.

In a last-ditch effort to save the label, Bogart decided to capitalize on Kiss' onstage notoriety and have the band record a live album. Kiss's manager Bill Aucoin was receptive toward the idea, as he felt the band could finally achieve the sound they sought. He also liked the fact that a live recording would be less expensive than a studio recording. The band members also liked the idea, and within a few days, Bogart arranged the Dressed to Kill Tour. Bogart could not finance the tour, however, so Aucoin paid for the entire tour with his own money, a total of $300,000.

== Recording ==
People have argued whether Alive! is a purely live recording or somehow enhanced. The answer is: yes, we enhanced it. Not to hide anything, not to fool anyone. But who wanted to hear a mistake repeated endlessly? Who wanted to hear an out-of-tune guitar? For what? Authenticity?

— Paul Stanley

Alive! was recorded over four stops on the Dressed to Kill Tour: May 16 at Cobo Arena in Detroit; June 21 at Cleveland Music Hall in Cleveland; July 20 at RKO Orpheum Theater in Davenport; and July 23 at [Convention Hall] in Wildwood. The 78-minute double album comprises 16 songs from the band's first three albums. The live performances featured elaborate setups. For example, during the song "100,000 Years," crew members used flamethrowers to engulf the stage in a ring of fire, and Peter Criss' drum kit rose high above the other band members.

Kiss' wild and energetic stage presence did not translate well to the live recordings. Stanley and Simmons had several miscues, such as playing the wrong chords, knocking over mics, and not singing directly into the mic. Producer Eddie Kramer knew that significant dubbing was needed to make the album sound good. For many years, Kiss denied the use of dubbing on Alive!. In Simmons' 2001 autobiography, Kiss and Make-up: A Memoir, he admitted the band had done some post-production alterations: "There have always been rumors that the Alive! record was substantially reworked in the studio. It's not true. We did touch up the vocal parts and fix some of the guitar solos, but we didn't have the time or money to completely rework the recordings. What we wanted, and what we got, was proof of the band's rawness and power." In a 2003 episode of Ultimate Albums, Kiss fully admitted to overdubbing the album. Stanley said: "What we felt was necessary was to capture the energy of the performance, not necessarily having it note for note of what actually happened." Simmons said: "Most people assume it was all live. It wasn't." Criss said: "We touched up what we had to do and I think it only made it better."

Kiss rerecorded parts of the album at Electric Lady Studios in August. The live recordings were so heavily altered, only Criss' drum tracks remained untouched. Even the audience was doctored, as Kramer spliced together the best cheers and screams from various Kiss performances. The band wanted the listener to feel like they were in fact in the audience watching the show, and since directly recording an audience would not sound good, this was considered to be the next best solution. Speaking about the heavy studio redubs years later, Kramer said: "Who cares if it was overdubbed? The energy still comes through."

== Music ==
Staff writers at Classic Rock Magazine wrote that the album is "bristling with gung-ho intensity and feral metal power, [and that it] it puts you right at the heart of the storm." The publication also said: "It’s like having bassist Gene Simmons stomping around your living room."

== Release ==
Alive! was released on September 10, 1975. The packaging featured a gatefold sleeve, a tour program with photos, and a photo of handwritten notes from the four band members printed on the sleeve gatefold interior. The first stop for the tour supporting the Alive! album was on its release day in Chattanooga, Tennessee. Five days after its release, Aucoin informed Bogart that Kiss were going to leave Casablanca. In response, Bogart signed a two million dollar check to retain the band.

=== Re-releases ===
Alive! was originally reissued as a double-CD set in what has now become known as a "Fatboy" 2CD case. When the Kiss back catalog was remastered, it was housed in a slimline 2CD case and, in keeping with the rest of the reissue program, had the artwork restored. Alive! was re-released in 2006 as part of the Kiss Alive! 1975–2000 box set. The short running time of Alive! allowed for a single, unedited CD edition in that release. The remastered CD edition eliminated the breaks between the four sides of the original LP release, resulting in that version of the album playing as one continuous performance. The 72-page booklet packaged with the CD set erroneously credited songwriting for "Cold Gin" to Stanley instead of Ace Frehley.

The album was reissued in 2014 on vinyl with the original artwork and sleeve. The album was reissued again in 2020 for its 45th anniversary on colored vinyl.

2025 the album was released as a box set for its 50th anniversary, which included a remastering of the original release, as well as several of the various soundboard recordings from which the album was compiled.

== Reception ==
Professional ratings
Review scores
Source	Rating
AllMusic	5/5 stars
Blender	5/5 stars
Christgau's Record Guide	B−
Collector's Guide to Heavy Metal	10/10
Encyclopedia of Popular Music	3/5 stars
Pitchfork	10/10
The Rolling Stone Album Guide	4/5 stars
Spin Alternative Record Guide	7/10
Uncut	5/5 stars

=== Critical ===
Alive! received negative and mixed reviews from contemporary critics. Alan Niester of Rolling Stone judged the band's music to be "awful, criminally repetitive, thuddingly monotonous ... and mildly entertaining for about ten minutes", remarking how Casablanca promoted Kiss as "new bad-boy teen idols". Village Voice critic Robert Christgau manifested "bemused curiosity" for the album and stated that, while many considered the album to be either "a de facto best-of" or "sludge", he and "the multimillion kids who are buying it don't fall into either category".

Modern reviews have generally been highly positive. Greg Prato of AllMusic considered Alive! to be "Kiss' greatest album ever." In The New Rolling Stone Album Guide, the album was called "a nonstop Kiss-Krieg of two-note guitar motifs, fake-sounding audience noise, and inspirational chitchat," but also "the next best thing to being there, clearly." Jason Josephes of Pitchfork wrote that "the album may seem like a joke, mainly because it contains every arena rock cliche in the book," but called it "total sonic proof of Kiss climbing their apex." Canadian journalist Martin Popoff remarked how Alive! "turned Kiss into an insane rock 'n' roll phenomenon" by elevating what were "economical and low-key hard rock ditties for kiddies" to "larger-than-life status, each now a bombastic track enveloped in fire-breathing mayhem, exploding smokebombs and screaming, hysterical crowds way too high in the mix."

=== Commercial ===
Alive! peaked at No. 9 on the Billboard 200 album charts, and charted for 110 weeks, by far the longest chart run in the band's history.

== Legacy ==
In 2003, the album was ranked No. 159 on Rolling Stone magazine's list of the 500 greatest albums of all time, maintaining the rating in a 2012 update, and dropping to number 305 in the 2020 revision. In 2006, it was placed at No. 26 on Guitar World magazine's list of the 100 Greatest Guitar Albums of All Time. In 2009, the same magazine placed it at No. 3 on their list of Top 10 Live Albums.

"Alive! was the first album I ever bought," Soundgarden's Kim Thayil told Guitar World in 1992. "And I wasn't alone: you can hear their influence all over metal and punk." Scott Ian and Charlie Benante of Anthrax were immediate fans of the album and "loved every single song on that record."

The RIAA acknowledge only 500,000 units sold in the United States, even though the album has sold over 9 million copies worldwide. The album has not been re-certified by RIAA after December 4, 1975, 3 months after it was originally released. Soundscan figures from 2007 add another 258,000 in US sales between 1991 and 2006, making it the band's fourth best selling pre-1991 album.

In 2021, Classic Rock Magazine stated: "This is the album that rescued Kiss’s career – and also saved their label from going down the pan. [...] Did rock'n'roll ever sound so goddamn gigantic? Listen to the mighty 'Black Diamond' or the epic '100,000 Years' and the answer has to be: no."

== Track listing ==
All credits adapted from the original releases.

Side one
No.	Title	Writer(s)	Lead vocals	Length
1.	"Deuce"	Gene Simmons	Simmons	3:32
2.	"Strutter"	Paul Stanley, Simmons	Stanley	3:12
3.	"Got to Choose"	Stanley	Stanley	3:35
4.	"Hotter Than Hell"	Stanley	Stanley	3:11
5.	"Firehouse"	Stanley	Stanley	3:42

Side two
No.	Title	Writer(s)	Lead vocals	Length
1.	"Nothin' to Lose"	Simmons	Simmons, Peter Criss	3:23
2.	"C'mon and Love Me"	Stanley	Stanley	2:52
3.	"Parasite"	Ace Frehley	Simmons	3:21
4.	"She"	Simmons, Stephen Coronel	Simmons, Stanley, Criss	6:42

Side three
No.	Title	Writer(s)	Lead vocals	Length
1.	"Watchin' You"	Simmons	Simmons	3:51
2.	"100,000 Years"	Stanley, Simmons	Stanley	12:12
3.	"Black Diamond"	Stanley	Criss, intro by Stanley	5:47

Side four
No.	Title	Writer(s)	Lead vocals	Length
1.	"Rock Bottom"	Stanley (intro: Frehley)	Stanley	3:08
2.	"Cold Gin"	Frehley	Simmons	5:21
3.	"Rock and Roll All Nite"	Stanley, Simmons	Simmons	3:37
4.	"Let Me Go, Rock 'n' Roll"	Stanley, Simmons	Simmons	5:09

== Personnel ==
Kiss

- Paul Stanley – vocals, rhythm guitar
- Gene Simmons – vocals, bass
- Peter Criss – drums, vocals
- Ace Frehley – lead guitar, backing vocals

Additional personnel

- J.R. Smalling – spoken word introduction

Production

- Eddie Kramer – producer, engineer, mixing
- George Marino – remastering

== Charts ==
=== Weekly charts ===
Chart (1975–1976)	Peak position
Australian Albums (Kent Music Report)	13
Canada Top Albums/CDs (RPM)	3
Japanese Albums (Oricon)	56
Norwegian Albums (VG-lista)	31
Swedish Albums (Sverigetopplistan)	22
UK Albums (Official Charts)	49
US Billboard 200	9

=== Year-end charts ===
Chart (1976)	Position
Australian Albums (Kent Music Report)	24
Canada Top Albums/CDs (RPM)	20
US Billboard 200	31

== Certifications ==
Region	Certification	Certified units/sales
Australia (ARIA)	Gold	20,000^{^}
Canada (Music Canada)	Gold	50,000^{^}
United States (RIAA)	Gold	500,000^{^}
^{^} Shipments figures based on certification alone.

== Sources ==
- Simmons, Gene (2001). Kiss and Make-Up. Crown Publishing Group. ISBN 978-1-4000-4523-5.
- Sharp, Ken; Simmons, Gene; Stanley, Paul (2013). Nothin' To Lose: The Making of KISS (1972-1975). HarperCollins. ISBN 978-0-0621-3173-7.
