= Destroyer Tour =

1976 concert tour by Kiss

- Tour by Kiss
- Poster to the concert in Harelbeke, Belgium
- Associated album: Destroyer
- Start date: April 11, 1976
- End date: September 12, 1976
- Legs: 3
- No. of shows: 57

Kiss concert chronology
- Alive! Tour (1975–1976); Destroyer Tour (1976); Rock & Roll Over Tour (1976–1977)

The Destroyer Tour also known as The Spirit of '76 Tour was a concert tour by Kiss, in support of their fourth studio album Destroyer.

== History ==
At the time of the European leg of the tour the Destroyer album was already released and the band performed songs from that album, but they wore the Alive! costumes and had the Alive! stage show. At the time, the tour was referred to under the headline "Kiss tour", not "Alive! Tour" or "Destroyer Tour".

The August 20 show in Anaheim, California was the most famous of the tour - the band played for more than 42,000 people, the biggest US crowd the band had played to. Bob Seger, Ted Nugent and Montrose were the opening acts. The J. Geils Band, Point Blank and Seger opened for them at their July 10 show in New Jersey, which was recorded and released on DVD decades later as "The Lost Concert".

Opening act Bob Seger would back out of a few dates on the tour so that he could complete work on his next album, in which he did not perform in Toronto.

In the tour program for the band's final tour, Simmons reflected on the tour:

With the special effects and staging we use, whether it was the Kiss sign, the Tesla coil on the Destroyer tour, the columns of fire, the lighted stairs or the drum riser, we reacted intrinsically to what we thought was cool. We went back to all the stuff we react to, 4th of July fireworks shows and things exploding. We wanted to go where no band had gone before.

== Kiss Destroys Anaheim '76 ==
On August 21, 2026, Universal released Kiss Destroys Anaheim '76 in honor of the 50th anniversary of Kiss' August 20, 1976 performance at Anaheim Stadium in front of over 42,000 fans, their largest audience to date. The show has been available as a bootleg for years, prompting Kiss' official release from the original multi-track master tapes by producer Eddie Kramer (who worked on all three albums in Kiss' Alive! series). It is available on LP, CD and digitally.

== Tour dates ==
List of 1976 concerts
Date	City	Country	Venue	Support act(s)
April 11, 1976	Fort Wayne	United States	Allen County War Memorial Coliseum	Artful Dodger
April 13, 1976	Utica	United States	Utica Memorial Auditorium	Ethos
April 14, 1976	Niagara Falls	United States	Niagara Falls Convention and Civic Center	Brownsville Station
April 16, 1976	Bangor	United States	Bangor Auditorium	Ethos
April 18, 1976	Moncton	Canada	Moncton Coliseum	Hammersmith
April 19, 1976	Halifax	Canada	Halifax Forum	Hammersmith
April 21, 1976	Montreal	Canada	Montreal Forum	Hammersmith
April 22, 1976	Ottawa	Canada	Ottawa Civic Centre	Hammersmith
April 23, 1976	Kitchener	Canada	Kitchener Memorial Auditorium	Hammersmith
April 24, 1976	London	Canada	London Gardens	Hammersmith
April 26, 1976	Toronto	Canada	Maple Leaf Gardens	Hammersmith
April 28, 1976	Winnipeg	Canada	Winnipeg Arena	Hammersmith
May 4, 1976	Mount Prospect	United States	River Trails Middle School	—N/a
May 13, 1976	Manchester	England	Free Trade Hall	Stray
May 14, 1976	Birmingham	England	Birmingham Odeon	Stray
May 15, 1976	London	England	Hammersmith Odeon	Stray
May 16, 1976	London	England	Hammersmith Odeon	Stray
May 18, 1976	Mannheim	West Germany	Mannheimer Rosengarten	Scorpions
May 19, 1976	Düsseldorf	West Germany	Philips Halle	Scorpions
May 22, 1976	Paris	France	Olympia Theatre	—N/a
May 23, 1976	Amsterdam	Netherlands	RAI Congrescentrum	Finch
May 24, 1976	Offenbach	West Germany	Stadthalle Offenbach	Scorpions
May 26, 1976	Gothenburg	Sweden	Scandinavium	—N/a
May 28, 1976	Stockholm	Sweden	Gröna Lund	—N/a
May 29, 1976	Copenhagen	Denmark	Falkoner Center	—N/a
May 30, 1976	Lund	Sweden	Olympen	—N/a
June 2, 1976	Zürich	Switzerland	Volkshaus	—N/a
June 3, 1976	Munich	West Germany	Circus Krone	Scorpions
June 4, 1976	Fürth	West Germany	MTV Grundig-Halle	Scorpions
June 6, 1976	Harelbeke	Belgium	Ontmoetingscentrum	Hoa Bihn
July 3, 1976	Norfolk	United States	Norfolk Scope	Bob Seger & the Silver Bullet Band
July 6, 1976	Columbia	United States	Carolina Coliseum	Bob Seger & the Silver Bullet Band
July 8, 1976	Richmond	United States	Richmond Coliseum	Bob Seger & the Silver Bullet Band
July 10, 1976	Jersey City	United States	Roosevelt Stadium	The J. Geils Band; Bob Seger & the Silver Bullet Band; Point Blank
July 11, 1976	South Yarmouth	United States	Cape Cod Coliseum	Bob Seger & the Silver Bullet Band
July 13, 1976	Baltimore	United States	Baltimore Civic Center	Bob Seger & the Silver Bullet Band
July 15, 1976	Knoxville	United States	Knoxville Civic Coliseum	Bob Seger & the Silver Bullet Band
July 17, 1976	Charleston	United States	Charleston Civic Center	Bob Seger & the Silver Bullet Band
July 19, 1976	Johnson City	United States	Freedom Hall Civic Center	Bob Seger & the Silver Bullet Band
July 21, 1976	Nashville	United States	Nashville Municipal Auditorium	Bob Seger & the Silver Bullet Band; UFO
July 23, 1976	Birmingham	United States	Rickwood Field	Bob Seger & the Silver Bullet Band; Kansas
July 26, 1976	Kansas City	United States	Kansas City Municipal Auditorium	Artful Dodger
July 28, 1976	St. Louis	United States	Kiel Auditorium	Bob Seger & the Silver Bullet Band
July 29, 1976	St. Louis	United States	Kiel Auditorium	Bob Seger & the Silver Bullet Band
July 31, 1976	Toledo	United States	Toledo Sports Arena	Starz
August 2, 1976	Indianapolis	United States	Market Square Arena	Bob Seger & the Silver Bullet Band; Artful Dodger
August 4, 1976	Little Rock	United States	Barton Coliseum	Bob Seger & the Silver Bullet Band
August 6, 1976	Evansville	United States	Roberts Municipal Stadium	Bob Seger & the Silver Bullet Band; Artful Dodger
August 8, 1976	Trotwood	United States	Hara Arena	Bob Seger & the Silver Bullet Band; Artful Dodger
August 10, 1976	Shreveport	United States	Hirsch Memorial Coliseum	Bob Seger & the Silver Bullet Band
August 11, 1976	Fort Worth	United States	Tarrant County Convention Center	Bob Seger & the Silver Bullet Band; Artful Dodger
August 13, 1976	Houston	United States	The Summit	Bob Seger & the Silver Bullet Band; Artful Dodger
August 15, 1976	El Paso	United States	El Paso County Coliseum	Moon Pie
August 17, 1976	Tempe	United States	Tempe Diablo Stadium	Bob Seger & the Silver Bullet Band; Ted Nugent
August 20, 1976	Anaheim	United States	Anaheim Stadium	Bob Seger & the Silver Bullet Band; Ted Nugent; Montrose
August 22, 1976	Oakland	United States	Oakland-Alameda County Coliseum Arena	Bob Seger & the Silver Bullet Band.38 Special
August 27, 1976	Greensboro	United States	Greensboro Coliseum	Point Blank; Artful Dodger
August 29, 1976	Atlanta	United States	Atlanta–Fulton County Stadium	Bob Seger & the Silver Bullet Band; Johnny Winter; Edgar Winter; Blue Öyster Cult.38 Special
September 1, 1976	South Bend	United States	Athletic & Convocation Center	Bob Seger & the Silver Bullet Band
September 3, 1976	Richfield	United States	Richfield Coliseum	Artful Dodger
September 4, 1976	Pittsburgh	United States	Civic Arena	Bob Seger & the Silver Bullet Band; Artful Dodger
September 6, 1976	Toronto	Canada	Varsity Stadium	Blue Öyster Cult; Artful Dodger
September 8, 1976	Louisville	United States	Freedom Hall	Bob Seger & the Silver Bullet Band; Artful Dodger
September 10, 1976	Cincinnati	United States	Riverfront Coliseum	Bob Seger & the Silver Bullet Band; Artful Dodger
September 12, 1976	Springfield	United States	Springfield Civic Center	Artful Dodger

=== Box office score data ===
List of box office score data with date, city, venue, attendance, gross, references
Date (1976)	City	Venue	Attendance	Gross	Ref(s)
April 11	Fort Wayne, United States	Allen County War Memorial Coliseum	9,650 / 9,650	$57,900	
April 14	Niagara Falls, United States	Niagara Falls Convention and Civic Center	9,500	$56,000	
April 16	Bangor, United States	Bangor Auditorium	6,932 / 6,932	$39,356	
July 8	Richmond, United States	Richmond Coliseum	6,430	$41,332	
July 10	Jersey City, United States	Roosevelt Stadium	13,867	$105,388	
July 21	Nashville, United States	Nashville Municipal Auditorium	8,300	$51,800	
August 2	Indianapolis, United States	Market Square Arena	19,000 / 19,000	$121,453	
August 6	Evansville, United States	Roberts Municipal Stadium	11,480	$72,254	
August 17	Tempe, United States	Tempe Diablo Stadium	15,913	$101,301	
August 20	Anaheim, United States	Anaheim Stadium	42,987	$437,653	
August 22	Oakland, United States	Oakland-Alameda County Coliseum Arena	9,897	$63,000	
August 27	Greensboro, United States	Greensboro Coliseum	11,068	$71,130	
August 29	Atlanta, United States	Atlanta–Fulton County Stadium	35,000	$300,000	
September 1	South Bend, United States	Athletic & Convocation Center	7,677	$47,911	
September 4	Pittsburgh, United States	Civic Arena	12,000	$73,436	
September 8	Louisville, United States	Freedom Hall	17,051	$103,918	
September 10	Cincinnati, United States	Riverfront Coliseum	13,391	$82,299	

== Personnel ==
- Paul Stanley – vocals, rhythm guitar
- Gene Simmons – vocals, bass
- Peter Criss – drums, vocals
- Ace Frehley – lead guitar, backing vocals
