= Destroyer (Kiss album) =

- Cover art by Ken Kelly

Studio album by Kiss
- Released: March 15, 1976
- Recorded: September 3–6, 1975; January 4 – February 5, 1976
- Studios: Electric Lady and Record Plant, New York City
- Genres: Hard rock; heavy metal
- Length: 34:28
- Label: Casablanca
- Producer: Bob Ezrin

Kiss chronology
Alive! (1975)	Destroyer (1976)	Rock and Roll Over (1976)

Singles from Destroyer
- 1. "Shout It Out Loud" Released: March 1, 1976; 2. "Flaming Youth" Released: April 30, 1976; 3. "Detroit Rock City" Released: July 28, 1976; 4. "Beth" Released: August 1976

Alternative cover
- Original album cover before it was redesigned. It would be used for the 2012 remix release.

Destroyer is the fourth studio album by American hard rock band Kiss, released on March 15, 1976, by Casablanca Records in the US. It was the third successive Kiss album to reach the top 40 in the US, as well as the first to chart in Germany and New Zealand. The album was certified gold by the RIAA on April 22, 1976, and platinum on November 11 of the same year, the first Kiss album to achieve platinum. The album marked a departure from the raw sound of the band's first three albums.

== Background ==
After attaining modest commercial success with its first three studio albums, Kiss achieved a commercial breakthrough with the 1975 concert album Alive!, which was the first album by the band to be certified gold. The success of Alive!, which spent 110 weeks on the charts, benefited not only the struggling band but also its cash-strapped label Casablanca Records. Kiss signed a new contract with Casablanca in late 1975, partly because the label had been very supportive from the start of the band's career. In an indication that Casablanca was uncertain whether the group could duplicate the accomplishments of Alive!, the contract was for only two albums.

== Songwriting and recording ==
"Beth"
"Beth" marked a musical departure for Kiss, with its heavy use of an orchestral section. The song became a No. 7 hit for the group.

"Shout It Out Loud"
This song, with its call-and-response verses and anthemic chorus, is typical of the hard rock songs on Destroyer.

In August 1975, while the group was embarking on its supporting tour for Alive!, rehearsals for Destroyer began. Bob Ezrin, who had previously worked with Alice Cooper, was brought in to produce the album. The band felt that Ezrin was the right person to maintain the commercial success the members had achieved with Alive! and to help them take the band's sound to the next level. Before meeting with Ezrin, the band had written and recorded a 15-song demo in the Magna Graphics Studio in August 1975. The first demo recorded during the Destroyer sessions was "Ain't None of Your Business" featuring Peter Criss on vocals. The plodding, heavy song, written by country songwriters Becky Hobbs and Lew Anderson, was rejected by the band and later appeared on the 1977 debut album by Detective. Although this song was rejected, other outside songs and suggestions were accepted by the band. In particular, Kim Fowley and Mark Anthony became important contributors during the songwriting process, bringing in the title and basic structure of the song "King of the Night Time World" from their previous band The Hollywood Stars' then-unreleased 1974 album Shine Like a Radio (which also featured the original version of the Alice Cooper song "Escape" from Welcome to My Nightmare).

Ezrin flat-out rejected most of the material; only heavily re-worked versions of "God of Thunder" and "Detroit Rock City" made it to the album, and another song, "Mad Dog", was pilfered for lyrics to "Sweet Pain" and a riff for "Flaming Youth". Other songs from this demo were re-worked for the following album Rock and Roll Over and Gene Simmons' 1978 solo album, while others remained unreleased until the 2021 release of Destroyer as a 2-CD set and Super Deluxe box set.

The first recording sessions for the album took place on September 3–6, 1975 at Electric Lady Studios in New York City, during a brief break between the Dressed to Kill and Alive! tours. The basic album tracks were recorded during this time. The majority of the recording sessions for Destroyer took place in January 1976, after the conclusion of the Alive! tour. Ezrin introduced to Kiss sound effects, strings, screaming children, reversed drums (on "God of Thunder") and a children's choir. The song "Great Expectations" uses the first phrase of the main theme from the second movement of Beethoven's Piano Sonata No. 8 in C minor, Op. 13 (known as Sonata Pathétique), but the songwriting is credited to Simmons and Ezrin.

The lyrics of the opening song "Detroit Rock City" tells the story of a fan who died in a car crash on the way to a Kiss show. Various dates and events have been mentioned but journalist James Campion managed with the help of a Kiss roadie from the era to link the event that inspired the song and a handful of candidates to the November 30, 1974 show in Fayetteville, North Carolina.

During the recording sessions, Ezrin resorted to numerous tactics designed to increase the quality of music Kiss recorded. Because none of the group were trained musicians, Ezrin halted the sessions at one point to provide lessons in basic music theory. To instill a sense of discipline, he wore a whistle around his neck and exhorted the band with sayings such as, "Campers, we're going to work!" When Simmons stopped playing during the recording of an outro, Ezrin yelled at him, saying, "Don't you ever stop a take unless I tell you!"

Paul Stanley later compared the experience of working with Ezrin as "musical boot camp" but said that the group "came out a lot smarter for it". Simmons echoed the sentiment by stating: "It was exactly what we needed at the time."

Destroyer is the first Kiss album to prominently feature outside musicians, such as members of the New York Philharmonic. One musician not credited was Dick Wagner, from Alice Cooper's band, replacing Ace Frehley on the track "Sweet Pain". Wagner also played the acoustic guitar on the song "Beth". The success of Alive! and Destroyer enabled the band to embark on its first tour of Europe.

== Artwork ==
The cover art for Destroyer was painted by fantasy artist Ken Kelly. Kelly was invited to a show and given a backstage pass. He said of the performance, "It blew me away." Kelly was later commissioned by the band to draw the cover for 1977's Love Gun.

Kelly's original version of the album cover was rejected by the record company because they felt the scene was too violent looking with the rubble and flames. Also, the original version had the members of Kiss wearing the Alive! costumes. The front cover shows the group striding on top of a pile of rubble, and a desolate background spotted with destroyed buildings, some of which are engulfed in flames. The back cover shows a similar scene, but with more buildings on fire. The front of the inner sleeve featured a large Kiss logo and the lyrics to "Detroit Rock City". The other side displayed the lyric "Shout it out loud", as well as an advertisement for the Kiss Army fan club.

== Reception ==
Professional ratings
Review scores
Source	Rating
AllMusic	4.5/5 stars
Blender	5/5 stars
Collector's Guide to Heavy Metal	8/10
Encyclopedia of Popular Music	4/5 stars
Pitchfork	9.0/10
The Rolling Stone Album Guide	3.5/5 stars
Spin Alternative Record Guide	7/10
Uncut	5/5 stars
The Village Voice	C+

Destroyer sold well upon its release on March 15, 1976, and was certified gold on April 22. Although exact sales figures are not known, Stanley stated that the album initially sold 850,000 copies in the US, well over any of Kiss's first three studio albums. After peaking at No. 11 on the Billboard 200 album chart on May 15, Destroyer quickly fell and by August was at No. 192. The first three singles—"Shout It Out Loud", "Flaming Youth" and "Detroit Rock City"—failed to ignite sales any further, though "Shout It Out Loud" did give the band its first No. 1 record, in Canada. The band and Ezrin cited fan backlash as the reason Destroyer did not meet sales expectations. Ezrin also stated that the "grassroots rock press" was particularly critical of the album. Rolling Stone referred to "bloated ballads", "pedestrian drumming" and "lackluster performances" in its review. Robert Christgau, writing in The Village Voice, felt that it was Kiss's "least interesting record" and criticized producer Ezrin for adding "only bombast and melodrama".

It was not until radio stations started playing "Beth", the B-side of the "Detroit Rock City" single, that the album started to sell as expected. The ballad, which according to Simmons was deliberately put on the B-side to force stations to play "Detroit Rock City", started receiving numerous listener requests and became an unexpected hit. "Beth" (sung and co-written by Peter Criss) was re-released as the fourth single in late August, and it peaked at No. 7 on the Billboard Hot 100 singles chart on September 25. It was the group's first Top 10 song in the US and reignited sales of the album.

On November 11, 1976, Destroyer became the first Kiss album to be certified platinum. It was re-certified at the double platinum level on September 9, 2011, and is the band's best-selling album in the post-1991 Soundscan era, selling 726,000 copies in the United States from 1991 to March 4, 2012.

The album has received recognition in later years. In 1989, Kerrang! magazine listed the album at No. 36 among the "100 Greatest Heavy Metal Albums of All Time". In The Rolling Stone Album Guide (2004), Rob Sheffield referred to Destroyer as "the inevitable arty concept album, from the drink-smoke-drive-die saga 'Detroit Rock City' to the touching 'Do You Love Me?'". The album was also featured in 1001 Albums You Must Hear Before You Die. In 2006, it was placed at No. 60 on Guitar World magazine's list of the 100 Greatest Guitar Albums of All Time. Greg Prato of AllMusic described Destroyer as "one of Kiss' most experimental studio albums, but also one of their strongest and most interesting." Pitchfork's Jason Josephes said that it is "easily one of the best albums in the Kiss canon" and credited Ezrin for ushering along "even more of an art/hard rock album than Kiss's previous efforts". Canadian journalist Martin Popoff, described Destroyer as a "no party album, looming darkly, ponderous, almost haunting at times, basically uncommunicative and puzzling due to its stylistic over-extension" and judged it a "success of early no-chops metal". In 2012, Rolling Stone ranked it at No. 489 on its list of the 500 greatest albums of all time, calling it "a ridiculously over-the-top party-rock album that just gets better with age".

== Track listing ==
=== Original release ===
All credits adapted from the original releases.

Side one
No.	Title	Writer(s)	Lead vocals	Length
1.	"Detroit Rock City"	Paul Stanley, Bob Ezrin	Paul Stanley	5:17
2.	"King of the Night Time World"	Stanley, Kim Fowley, Mark Anthony, Ezrin	Paul Stanley	3:19
3.	"God of Thunder"	Stanley	Gene Simmons	4:13
4.	"Great Expectations"	Gene Simmons, Ezrin	Gene Simmons	4:24

Side two
No.	Title	Writer(s)	Lead vocals	Length
5.	"Flaming Youth"	Ace Frehley, Stanley, Simmons, Ezrin	Paul Stanley	2:59
6.	"Sweet Pain"	Simmons	Gene Simmons	3:20
7.	"Shout It Out Loud"	Stanley, Simmons, Ezrin	Paul Stanley, Gene Simmons	2:49
8.	"Beth"	Peter Criss, Stan Penridge, Ezrin	Peter Criss	2:45
9.	"Do You Love Me"	Stanley, Fowley, Ezrin	Paul Stanley	3:33
10.	"Rock and Roll Party" (Instrumental)	Simmons, Stanley, Ezrin		1:25
Total length:				34:11

- "Rock and Roll Party" appears a few seconds after "Do You Love Me?" as a hidden track on the original vinyl pressing.

== Destroyer: Resurrected ==
In anticipation of the 35th anniversary of the release of Destroyer, producer Bob Ezrin approached Simmons and Stanley about doing a remix and re-release of the original album. With their approval, Ezrin acquired digital copies of the original 16-track analog master tapes. In addition to re-equalizing elements of each song, Ezrin also added in some parts of tracks that had been omitted from the original mix. These include some additional vocals on "Detroit Rock City" and "Beth", and the substitution of a guitar solo by Frehley on "Sweet Pain" for the one from the original that had been performed by Wagner (a version of "Sweet Pain" with Frehley's solo was included as track 6, while the original version with Wagner's solo is appended as a "bonus" track at the end of the new CD). Ezrin also used digital manipulation to fix an incorrect lyric (changing "down 95" to "doin' 95") on "Detroit Rock City". The resulting album, titled Destroyer: Resurrected, was released on August 21, 2012. It featured Ken Kelly's original cover artwork before alteration by Casablanca for the 1976 release.

Destroyer: Resurrected met with mixed critical reception. William Clark of Guitar International wrote: "Each track sounds crisper, clearer and louder, which are always welcome qualities when you're listening to a classic album of the likes of Destroyer". However, Circus magazine in a joint review with Aerosmith's contemporary release of Rocks praised Rocks while stating that Destroyer "stinks." The album returned to the Billboard charts, debuting at No. 11 the week after its re-release. In 2019, the record was released in orange translucent vinyl, retailed exclusively by Walmart in the U.S.

=== Destroyer: Resurrected (2012 remix) ===
No.	Title	Writer(s)	Lead vocals	Length
1.	"Detroit Rock City"	Paul Stanley, Bob Ezrin	Paul Stanley	5:15
2.	"King of the Night Time World"	Stanley, Kim Fowley, Mark Anthony, Ezrin	Paul Stanley	3:21
3.	"God of Thunder"	Stanley	Gene Simmons	4:17
4.	"Great Expectations"	Gene Simmons, Ezrin	Gene Simmons	4:24
5.	"Flaming Youth"	Ace Frehley, Stanley, Simmons, Ezrin	Paul Stanley	2:59
6.	"Sweet Pain"	Simmons	Gene Simmons	3:21
7.	"Shout It Out Loud"	Stanley, Simmons, Ezrin	Paul Stanley, Gene Simmons	2:51
8.	"Beth"	Peter Criss, Stan Penridge, Ezrin	Peter Criss	2:46
9.	"Do You Love Me"	Stanley, Fowley, Ezrin	Paul Stanley	3:40
10.	"Rock and Roll Party" (Instrumental)	Stanley, Simmons, Ezrin		1:26
11.	"Sweet Pain"	Simmons	Gene Simmons	3:18

- "Rock and Roll Party" appears a few seconds after "Do You Love Me?" as a hidden track on the original vinyl pressing.
- "Sweet Pain" (track 6) guitar solo by Ace Frehley, previously unreleased
- "Sweet Pain" (track 11) guitar solo by Dick Wagner, from the original release (omitted from vinyl version)

== 45th anniversary ==
In celebration of Destroyers 45th anniversary, Universal released a 4 CD & Dolby Atmos & 5.1 Surround Blu-ray Audio disc and 6 LP & Blu-ray Super Deluxe editions on November 19, 2021. Simultaneously, Universal also released an edited 2 CD version.

=== Super Deluxe edition 6 LPs & Blu-ray ===
Disc 1, Original album
No.	Title	Length
1.	"Detroit Rock City"	5:15
2.	"King of the Night Time World"	3:20
3.	"God of Thunder"	4:16
4.	"Great Expectations"	4:24
5.	"Flaming Youth"	3:00
6.	"Sweet Pain"	3:20
7.	"Shout It Out Loud"	2:50
8.	"Beth"	2:48
9.	"Do You Love Me"	3:39
10.	"Rock and Roll Party"	1:25

Disc 2, Paul Stanley Demos
No.	Title	Length
1.	"Doncha Hesitate"	2:41
2.	"God of Thunder and Rock and Roll"	2:56
3.	"It's The Fire"	3:42
4.	"Detroit Rock City"	2:20
5.	"Love Is Alright"	3:22

Gene Simmons Demos
No.	Title	Length
6.	"Bad, Bad Lovin'"	3:36
7.	"Man of a Thousand Faces"	3:43
8.	"I Don't Want No Romance" (Early version of "Ladies Room")	2:43
9.	"Burnin' Up With Fever"	3:59
10.	"Rock N' Rolls Royce"	3:02
11.	"Mad Dog"	2:32
12.	"Night Boy"	2:35
13.	"Star"	2:54
14.	"Howlin' For Your Love"	2:50
15.	"True Confessions"	3:31

Disc 3: Outtakes, Alternate Versions/Mixes, Single Edits
No.	Title	Length
1.	"Beth" (Acoustic Mix)	2:48
2.	"Shout It Out Loud" (Single Edit)	2:39
3.	"Flaming Youth" (Single Edit)	2:41
4.	"Detroit Rock City" (Single Edit)	2:58
5.	"Shout It Out Loud" (Mono Single Edit)	2:39
6.	"Flaming Youth" (Mono Single Edit)	2:42
7.	"Detroit Rock City" (Mono Single Edit)	2:58
8.	"Beth" (Mono)	2:46
9.	"King of the Night Time World" (Live Rehearsal Instrumental)	4:01
10.	"Do You Love Me" (Mono Instrumental)	3:35
11.	"God of Thunder" (Early Instrumental Mix)	4:07
12.	"Ain't None of Your Business" (Instrumental)	3:31

Disc 4: Outtakes, Alternate Versions/Mixes, Single Edits
No.	Title	Length
1.	"Detroit Rock City" (Instrumental)	3:52
2.	"King of the Night Time World" (Alternate Mix)	3:34
3.	"Great Expectations" (Early Version)	4:26
4.	"Flaming Youth" (Early Version)	3:10
5.	"Do You Love Me" (Early Version)	3:08
6.	"Shout It Out Loud" (Alternate Mix)	3:16
7.	"Ain't None of Your Business" (Outtake)	3:59
8.	"Beth" (Take 6 - Instrumental)	2:45
9.	"Beth" (Instrumental)	2:13
10.	"Do You Love Me" (Alternate Mix)	3:37

Disc 5: Live in Paris: L’Olympia - May 22, 1976
No.	Title	Writer(s)	Lead vocals	Length
1.	"Deuce"	Simmons	Gene Simmons	4:49
2.	"Strutter"	Stanley, Simmons	Paul Stanley	3:21
3.	"Flaming Youth"	Ace Frehley, Stanley, Simmons, Ezrin	Paul Stanley	3:51
4.	"Hotter than Hell"	Stanley	Paul Stanley	3:20
5.	"Firehouse"	Stanley	Paul Stanley	3:49
6.	"She/Ace Frehley Guitar Solo"	Simmons, Stephen Coronel	Gene Simmons, Paul Stanley	7:39
7.	"Nothin' to Lose"	Simmons	Simmons, Criss, Stanley	3:37

Disc 6: Live in Paris: L’Olympia - May 22, 1976
No.	Title	Writer(s)	Lead vocals	Length
1.	"Shout It Out Loud / Gene Simmons Bass Solo"	Stanley, Simmons, Ezrin	Gene Simmons, Paul Stanley	4:01
2.	"100,000 Years/Peter Criss Drum Solo"	Stanley, Simmons	Paul Stanley	10:37
3.	"Black Diamond"	Stanley	Criss, Stanley	7:17
4.	"Detroit Rock City"	Stanley, Ezrin	Paul Stanley	5:58
5.	"Rock and Roll All Nite"	Stanley, Simmons	Simmons	4:05

Blu-ray
No.	Title	Length
1.	"Detroit Rock City"	5:15
2.	"King of the Night Time World"	3:20
3.	"God of Thunder"	4:16
4.	"Great Expectations"	4:24
5.	"Flaming Youth"	3:00
6.	"Sweet Pain"	3:20
7.	"Shout It Out Loud"	2:50
8.	"Beth"	2:48
9.	"Do You Love Me"	3:39
10.	"Rock and Roll Party"	1:25
11.	"Beth" (Acoustic)	2:51
12.	"Sweet Pain" (Original Guitar Solo)	3:21

=== Super Deluxe edition 4 CDs & Blu-ray ===
CD 1, Original album
No.	Title	Length
1.	"Detroit Rock City"	5:15
2.	"King of the Night Time World"	3:20
3.	"God of Thunder"	4:16
4.	"Great Expectations"	4:24
5.	"Flaming Youth"	3:00
6.	"Sweet Pain"	3:20
7.	"Shout It Out Loud"	2:50
8.	"Beth"	2:48
9.	"Do You Love Me"	3:39
10.	"Rock and Roll Party"	1:25

CD 2, Paul Stanley Demos
No.	Title	Length
1.	"Doncha Hesitate"	2:41
2.	"God of Thunder and Rock and Roll"	2:56
3.	"It's The Fire"	3:42
4.	"Detroit Rock City"	2:20
5.	"Love Is Alright"	3:22

Gene Simmons Demos
No.	Title	Length
6.	"Bad, Bad Lovin'"	3:36
7.	"Man of a Thousand Faces"	3:43
8.	"I Don't Want No Romance" (Early version of "Ladies Room")	2:43
9.	"Burnin' Up With Fever"	3:59
10.	"Rock N' Rolls Royce"	3:02
11.	"Mad Dog"	2:32
12.	"Night Boy"	2:35
13.	"Star"	2:54
14.	"Howlin' For Your Love"	2:50
15.	"True Confessions"	3:31

CD 3: Outtakes, Alternate Versions/Mixes, Single Edits
No.	Title	Length
1.	"Beth" (Acoustic Mix)	2:48
2.	"Shout It Out Loud" (Single Edit)	2:39
3.	"Flaming Youth" (Single Edit)	2:41
4.	"Detroit Rock City" (Single Edit)	2:58
5.	"Shout It Out Loud" (Mono Single Edit)	2:39
6.	"Flaming Youth" (Mono Single Edit)	2:42
7.	"Detroit Rock City" (Mono Single Edit)	2:58
8.	"Beth" (Mono)	2:46
9.	"King of the Night Time World" (Live Rehearsal Instrumental)	4:01
10.	"Do You Love Me" (Mono Instrumental)	3:35
11.	"God of Thunder" (Early Instrumental Mix)	4:07
12.	"Ain't None of Your Business" (Instrumental)	3:31
13.	"Detroit Rock City" (Instrumental)	3:52
14.	"King of the Night Time World" (Alternate Mix)	3:34
15.	"Great Expectations" (Early Version)	4:26
16.	"Flaming Youth" (Early Version)	3:10
17.	"Do You Love Me" (Early Version)	3:08
18.	"Shout It Out Loud" (Alternate Mix)	3:16
19.	"Ain't None of Your Business" (Outtake)	3:59
20.	"Beth" (Take 6 - Instrumental)	2:45
21.	"Beth" (Instrumental)	2:13
22.	"Do You Love Me" (Alternate Mix)	3:37
23.	"Detroit Rock City Car Intro" (Hidden track)	1:13
24.	"Detroit Rock City Car Crash" (Hidden track)	0:18

CD 4: Live in Paris: L’Olympia - May 22, 1976
No.	Title	Length
1.	"Deuce"	4:49
2.	"Strutter"	3:21
3.	"Flaming Youth"	3:51
4.	"Hotter than Hell"	3:20
5.	"Firehouse"	3:49
6.	"She/Ace Frehley Guitar Solo"	7:39
7.	"Nothin' to Lose"	3:37
8.	"Shout It Out Loud / Gene Simmons Bass Solo"	4:01
9.	"100,000 Years/Peter Criss Drum Solo"	10:37
10.	"Black Diamond"	7:17
11.	"Detroit Rock City"	5:58
12.	"Rock and Roll All Nite"	4:05

Blu-ray
No.	Title	Length
1.	"Detroit Rock City"	5:15
2.	"King of the Night Time World"	3:20
3.	"God of Thunder"	4:16
4.	"Great Expectations"	4:24
5.	"Flaming Youth"	3:00
6.	"Sweet Pain"	3:20
7.	"Shout It Out Loud"	2:50
8.	"Beth"	2:48
9.	"Do You Love Me"	3:39
10.	"Rock and Roll Party"	1:25
11.	"Beth" (Acoustic)	2:51
12.	"Sweet Pain" (Original Guitar Solo)	3:21

=== 45th Anniversary 2-CD Deluxe Edition, Disc 2 ===
Paul Stanley Demos
No.	Title	Length
1.	"God of Thunder and Rock and Roll"	2:56
2.	"Detroit Rock City"	2:20
3.	"Love Is Alright"	3:22

Gene Simmons Demos
No.	Title	Length
4.	"I Don't Want No Romance"	2:43
5.	"Rock N' Rolls Royce"	3:02
6.	"Star"	2:54

Rarities
No.	Title	Writer(s)	Lead vocals	Length
7.	"Beth" (Acoustic)	Criss, Penridge, Ezrin	Peter Criss	2:51
8.	"Shout It Out Loud" (Mono Single Edit)	Stanley, Simmons, Ezrin	Paul Stanley, Gene Simmons	2:39
9.	"King of The Night Time World" (Live Rehearsal Instrumental)	Stanley, Fowley, Anthony, Ezrin		4:01
10.	"Detroit Rock City" (Instrumental)	Stanley, Ezrin		3:52
11.	"Flaming Youth" (Early Version)	Frehley, Stanley, Simmons, Ezrin	Paul Stanley	3:10
12.	"Shout It Out Loud" (Alternate Mix)	Stanley, Simmons, Ezrin	Paul Stanley, Gene Simmons	3:16

Live in Paris: L’Olympia - May 22, 1976
No.	Title	Writer(s)	Lead vocals	Length
13.	"Deuce"			4:49
14.	"Strutter"			3:21
15.	"Flaming Youth"	Frehley, Stanley, Simmons, Ezrin	Paul Stanley	3:51
16.	"Hotter than Hell"			3:20
Total length:				52:27

== Personnel ==
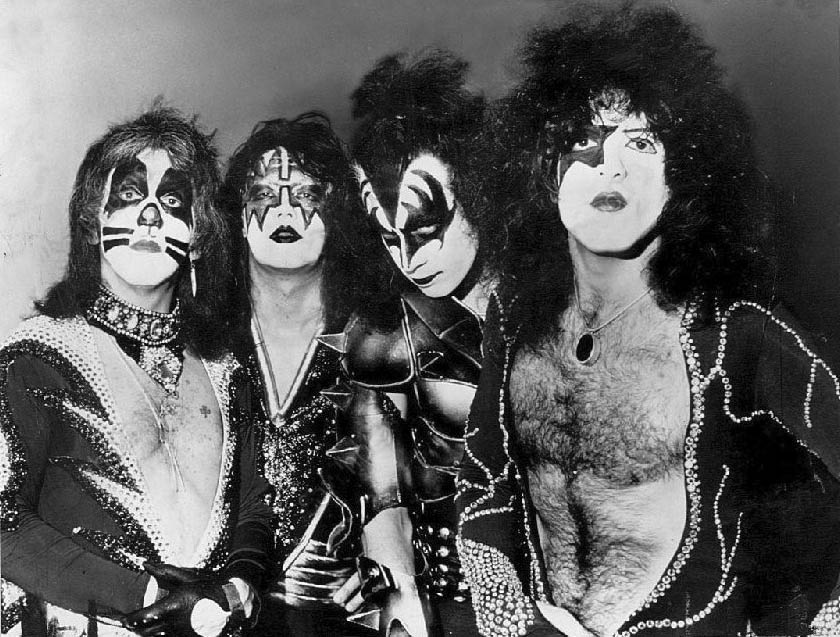
Kiss in makeup, 1976: (L–R) Peter "Catman" Criss, Ace "the Spaceman" Frehley, Gene "the Demon" Simmons, Paul "Starchild" Stanley.

Kiss

- Paul Stanley – vocals, rhythm guitar
- Gene Simmons – vocals, bass
- Peter Criss – drums, vocals
- Ace Frehley – lead guitar, backing vocals

Additional musicians

- Dick Wagner – guitar solo on "Sweet Pain", guitar licks on "Flaming Youth", acoustic guitar on "Great Expectations" and "Beth"
- Brooklyn Boys Chorus – additional vocals on "Great Expectations"
- David and Josh Ezrin – voices on "God of Thunder"
- New York Philharmonic – orchestra on "Beth"
- Tasha Thomas and Carl Hall - backing vocals on "Sweet Pain"

Production

- Bob Ezrin – producer, orchestration, keyboards, piano on "Beth"
- H. A. Macmillan – orchestration
- Jay Messina, Corky Stasiak – engineers

== Charts ==
Chart (1976)	Peak position
Australian Albums (Kent Music Report)	6
Canada Top Albums/CDs (RPM)	6
Japanese Albums (Oricon)	17
New Zealand Albums (RMNZ)	16
Norwegian Albums (VG-lista)	25
Swedish Albums (Sverigetopplistan)	4
UK Albums (Official Charts)	22
US Billboard 200	11

Chart (2021)	Peak position
Belgian Albums (Ultratop Flanders)	108
Belgian Albums (Ultratop Wallonia)	119
Dutch Albums (Album Top 100)	68
German Albums (Offizielle Top 100)	16
Scottish Albums (Official Charts)	36
Swiss Albums (Schweizer Hitparade)	55
US Top Catalog Albums (Billboard)	4
US Indie Store Album Sales (Billboard)	3

Chart (2026)	Peak position
German Rock & Metal Albums (Offizielle Top 100)	16

== Certifications ==
Region	Certification	Certified units/sales
Australia (ARIA)	Gold	20,000^{^}
Brazil (Pro-Música Brasil) 45th Anniversary Super Deluxe edition	Gold	100,000^{‡}
United States (RIAA)	2× Platinum	2,000,000^{^}
^{^} Shipments figures based on certification alone.^{‡} Sales+streaming figures based on certification alone.

== Accolades ==
Publication	Country	Accolade	Year	Rank
Rolling Stone	U.S.	The 500 Greatest Albums of All Time	2003	496
Blender	U.S.	The 100 Greatest American Albums of All Time	2002	50
Guitar World	U.S.	The 100 Greatest Guitar Albums of All Time.	2006	60

== Release history ==
Country	Date	Label	Format	Catalogue number
United States	March 15, 1976	Casablanca Records	LP	NBLP-7025
Canada	1976	Casablanca Records	LP	NBLP-7025V
United States	July 1987	Casablanca/PolyGram	CD	824 149–2
United States	August 12, 1997	Mercury Records	Remastered CD	532 378–2
Worldwide	August 21, 2012	Universal Music Group	Re-release	—
Worldwide	2014	Universal Music Group	Remastered LP	B0019818-01
