= Dressed to Kill (album) =

Studio album by Kiss
- Released: March 19, 1975
- Recorded: February 8 – 18, 1975
- Studios: Electric Lady, New York City
- Genre: Hard rock
- Length: 30:07
- Label: Casablanca
- Producers: Neil Bogart, Kiss

Kiss chronology
Hotter Than Hell (1974)	Dressed to Kill (1975)	Alive! (1975)

Singles from Dressed to Kill
- 1. "Rock and Roll All Nite" Released: April 2, 1975; 2. "C'mon and Love Me" Released: July 10, 1975

Dressed to Kill is the third studio album by American hard rock band Kiss, released on March 19, 1975. It was produced by Casablanca Records president Neil Bogart and the band itself as the label's financial situation at the time did not permit the hiring of a professional producer.

At 30 minutes and 7 seconds, Dressed to Kill is the shortest Kiss studio album.

== Album information ==
Possibly due to the short length of the album, original vinyl versions had long pauses between each track to make the sides longer than they would be based on the material they had. Each side ran just 15 minutes, and some of the song times were listed incorrectly on the vinyl versions. For example, "Two Timer" was listed at 2:59 and "Ladies in Waiting" was listed at 2:47.

The album cover was photographed on October 26, 1974 by Bob Gruen. While the cover depicts Kiss in business suits, the only member of the band who owned one was Peter Criss. The suits worn on the cover by the rest of the band were owned by manager Bill Aucoin. The original vinyl release of the album also had the Kiss logo embossed around the picture. The photograph of the band on the album cover was taken on the southwest corner of West 23rd Street and 8th Avenue in Manhattan looking north in New York City. A remastered edition of Dressed to Kill was released in 1997.

== Recording ==
Dressed to Kill was recorded in 10 days at Electric Lady in Studio B during February 1975 with the working title "Kiss at Midnight". According to Peter Criss, Neil Bogart's first decision as a producer was to bring in a pound of weed. Paul Stanley stated that Neil didn't do much except say “that's a good take.” "He wasn't trying to keep it fresh, but save money. I remember doing a sloppy take and his saying “Well that should do it.” And I said, no....”. Ace Frehley recorded his guitar parts using a speaker with a cardboard box for the shell. Paul Stanley played the lead on the intro to "C'mon and Love Me". Gene Simmons played guitar on “Ladies in Waiting.” Simmons said, “Ladies in Waiting” was written in the studio, in one afternoon and taught to the band that night. It was all done very quickly with little thought.” Paul mentions adding acoustic guitars to "Anything for My Baby “...because BTO was doing it.” Roadie Paul Chavarria said all of the roadies are on the chorus of “Rock and Roll All Nite” pulling their zippers on their leather jackets up and down to the rhythm of the song.

== Reception ==
Professional ratings
Review scores
Source	Rating
AllMusic	4.5/5 stars
Blender	4/5 stars
Collector's Guide to Heavy Metal	7/10
Encyclopedia of Popular Music	3/5 stars
Pitchfork	9.5/10
Rolling Stone	3/5 stars
Spin Alternative Record Guide	5/10
Uncut	3/5 stars
The Village Voice	B

Dressed to Kill peaked at No. 32 on the Billboard 200 album chart in the US and was certified gold by the RIAA on February 28, 1977. "C'mon and Love Me" and "Rock and Roll All Nite" were released as singles, but failed to rise up the charts. A live version of "Rock and Roll All Nite" from Alive!, issued as a single later that year, reached No. 12 on the Billboard Hot 100.

Hi-Fi for Pleasure said of the album:

Hopefully, the coming and going trendiness of Kiss won't leave them high and dry. We're so desperately short of showman crutch [sic] rock that albums like these feel like fresh air and just as rare. But the signs are there that they've been pronounced a bit too proficient to be really heavy.

Richard Riegel in the July issue of Creem Magazine in 1975 also said

Kiss are the authentic punk's of 1975, Nope, they don't play "Louie, Louie" and they don't wear polkadot shirts, and this ain't 1966 baby! But Kiss do fit the classic definition of Punk Rock: Provincial American reinterpretation of the reigning stylistic establishment.

"Rock and Roll All Nite" is one of Kiss' most well-known songs – and has remained a staple in the band's concerts since 1975 – along with "Rock Bottom", "C'mon and Love Me", and "She".

== Track listing ==
All credits adapted from the original release.

Side one
No.	Title	Writer(s)	Lead vocals	Length
1.	"Room Service"	Paul Stanley	Stanley	2:59
2.	"Two Timer"	Gene Simmons	Simmons	2:47
3.	"Ladies in Waiting"	Simmons	Simmons	2:35
4.	"Getaway"	Ace Frehley	Peter Criss	2:43
5.	"Rock Bottom"	Frehley, Stanley	Stanley	3:54

Side two
No.	Title	Writer(s)	Lead vocals	Length
6.	"C'mon and Love Me"	Stanley	Stanley	2:57
7.	"Anything for My Baby"	Stanley	Stanley	2:35
8.	"She"	Simmons, Stephen Coronel	Simmons, Stanley	4:08
9.	"Love Her All I Can"	Stanley	Stanley	2:40
10.	"Rock and Roll All Nite"	Stanley, Simmons	Simmons	2:49
Total length:				30:07

== Personnel ==
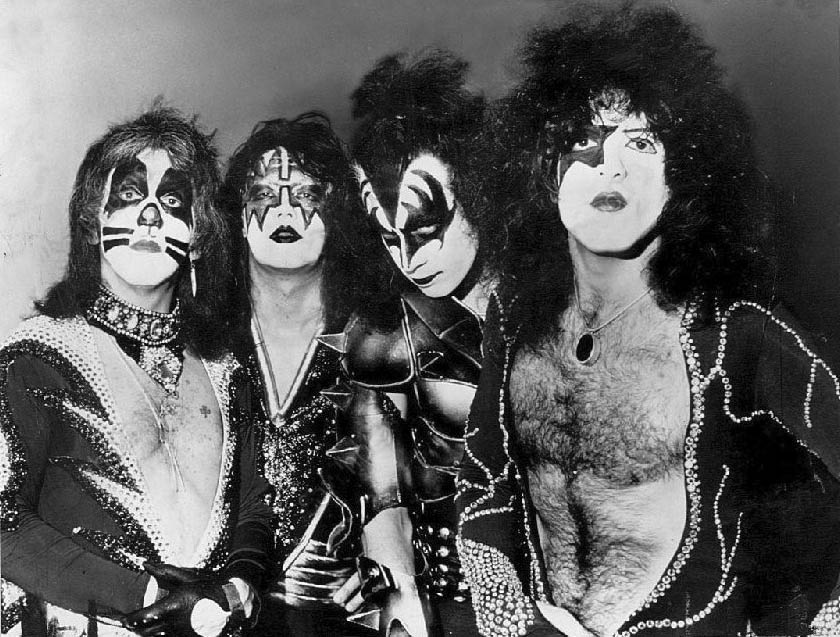
Kiss in makeup, 1976: (L–R) Peter "Catman" Criss, Ace "the Spaceman" Frehley, Gene "the Demon" Simmons, Paul "Starchild" Stanley.

Kiss

- Paul Stanley – vocals, rhythm guitar; intro guitar solo on "C'mon and Love Me"
- Gene Simmons – vocals, bass; rhythm guitar on "Ladies in Waiting"
- Peter Criss – drums, vocals
- Ace Frehley – lead guitar, acoustic guitar, backing vocals, all guitars and bass on "Getaway" and "Rock Bottom"

Production

- Neil Bogart – producer
- Dave Wittman – engineer
- George Lopez – assistant engineer
- Allen Zentz – mastering
- Bob Gruen – photography
- Joseph M. Palmaccio – remastering

== Charts ==
Chart (1975)	Peak position
Canada Top Albums/CDs (RPM)	26
US Billboard 200	32

== Certifications ==
Region	Certification	Certified units/sales
Australia (ARIA)	Gold	20,000^{^}
United States (RIAA)	Gold	500,000^{^}
^{^} Shipments figures based on certification alone.

== Release history ==
- Casablanca NBLP-7016 (March 19, 1975): First LP issue
- Mercury 824 148-2 M-1 (July 1987): First CD issue
- Mercury 314 532 3762 (July 15, 1997): Remastered CD
- Mercury B0020146-01 (April 1, 2014): 180-gram vinyl LP, reissue
