= Rock and Roll Over =

- Cover art by Michael Doret

Studio album by Kiss
- Released: November 11, 1976
- Recorded: September 28 – October 17, 1976
- Studios: Star Theatre, Nanuet, New York
- Genre: Hard rock
- Length: 32:38
- Label: Casablanca
- Producer: Eddie Kramer

Kiss chronology
Destroyer (1976)	Rock and Roll Over (1976)	Love Gun (1977)

Singles from Rock and Roll Over
- 1. "Hard Luck Woman" Released: November 1, 1976; 2. "Calling Dr. Love" Released: February 13, 1977

Rock and Roll Over is the fifth studio album by American rock band Kiss, released on November 11, 1976, by Casablanca Records. It was recorded at the Star Theatre in Nanuet, New York. The album contains the songs "Hard Luck Woman" and "Calling Dr. Love", which became hit singles in the United States.

== Album information ==
To get the proper drum sound, Peter Criss recorded his tracks in a bathroom, communicating via video-link with the rest of the band. This is the first Kiss album to not feature a writing credit from Ace Frehley.

Many of the songs that appear on the album were developed before or during Destroyer. Three of Gene Simmons' songs are clear re-workings of demos from the 1975 Magna Graphics Studios demo: "Calling Dr. Love" is a re-working of "Bad, Bad Lovin'"; "Ladies Room" is based on "Don't Want Your Romance"; and "Love' Em and Leave' Em" is based on "Rock and Rolls-Royce"; Criss's "Baby Driver" is a rewrite of a Peter Criss/Stan Penridge demo from Criss's pre-Kiss band Lips; and "Hard Luck Woman", a song Paul Stanley originally planned to pitch to Rod Stewart, was held over to provide Criss a ballad to sing following the success of "Beth".

== Recording ==
Using the Record Plant recording truck, Kiss began recording in the Star Theatre, a theater-in-the-round, in Nanuet, New York on September 30, 1976 and completed basic tracks on October 11th, with overdubs being done at the Record Plant from October 12–17. Working 16–17 hours a day, Eddie Kramer attempted to capture the live sound of the band by utilizing the entire building. Ace, Paul and Gene's amplifiers were placed under the stage in separate dressing rooms to prevent bleed into the drum mics. Peter's drums were recorded both on the middle of the stage and in a bathroom. Vocals were sometimes done in hallways. Kramer recorded with the same special tube microphones that he had used with Jimi Hendrix and Led Zeppelin. Engineer Corky Stasiak has amusingly recounted a story of his skateboarding down the steep aisle of the theater and attempting to jump onto the stage, only to pinball into the drums and microphones. He hurriedly reset everything, without the band's nor Kramer's knowledge. Shortly thereafter, while listening to a playback, Paul Stanley commented, “it sounds better today than it did yesterday.”

== Release ==
Rock and Roll Over was released by Casablanca Records on November 11, 1976, and peaked at No. 11 on the Billboard 200.

The cover artwork is by Michael Doret, who worked with Kiss again on 2009's Sonic Boom. Inside the sleeve was a sticker of the cover art and a glossy photo press release pamphlet. The live album Kings Among Scotland, by Anthrax, pays homage to the artwork.

"Hard Luck Woman" did not equal the success of "Beth", but became another top 20 single, as did "Calling Dr. Love". The latter also became a concert staple.

== Reception ==
Professional ratings
Review scores
Source	Rating
AllMusic	4/5 stars
Blender	4/5 stars
Christgau's Record Guide	B−
Collector's Guide to Heavy Metal	7/10
Encyclopedia of Popular Music	2/5 stars
Pitchfork	7.5/10
The Rolling Stone Album Guide	3/5 stars
Spin Alternative Record Guide	5/10
Sputnikmusic	4.5/5
Uncut	3/5 stars

In a contemporary review of the album, Robert Christgau wrote that Kiss "write tough, catchy songs, and if they had a sly, Jagger-style singer they'd be a menace", but are diminished by appearing as a "caricature" of themselves.

Modern reviews are generally positive. Greg Prato of AllMusic was largely praising of Rock and Roll Over for the band's "return to the raw hard rock of their first four albums", proclaiming it "one of Kiss' most consistent records". A Pitchfork reviewer compared the album to Destroyer, finding it "sonically punchier, if not just a bit lacking in complete vitality". In his Collector's Guide to Heavy Metal, Martin Popoff called Rock and Roll Over "the most childish Kiss album" and "a disappointment after the amusing ambitions, diversions and excursions of Destroyer", lamenting the "return to the wee dumb hard rock cartoons of the early albums".

In a retrospective review from Beverly Paterson of Something Else! said about the album:

The pressure was on for Kiss to keep the momentum going, and Rock and Roll Over appeared only several months after Destroyer was issued. A rushed affair to be sure but, as history has proven, the best rock music has always thrived on spontaneity. Stripped down to the bare essentials, Rock and Roll Over documents Kiss in their prime, plugging in as a perfect paragon of the band’s brand of heavy-duty glitter garage rock.

== Track listing ==
All credits adapted from the original release.

Side one
No.	Title	Writer(s)	Lead vocals	Length
1.	"I Want You"	Paul Stanley	Stanley	3:04
2.	"Take Me"	Stanley, Sean Delaney	Stanley	2:56
3.	"Calling Dr. Love"	Gene Simmons	Simmons	3:44
4.	"Ladies Room"	Simmons	Simmons	3:27
5.	"Baby Driver"	Peter Criss, Stan Penridge	Criss	3:40

Side two
No.	Title	Writer(s)	Lead vocals	Length
6.	"Love 'Em and Leave 'Em"	Simmons	Simmons	3:47
7.	"Mr. Speed"	Stanley, Delaney	Stanley	3:18
8.	"See You in Your Dreams"	Simmons	Simmons	2:34
9.	"Hard Luck Woman"	Stanley	Criss	3:35
10.	"Makin' Love"	Stanley, Delaney	Stanley	3:14
Total length:				33:18

== Personnel ==
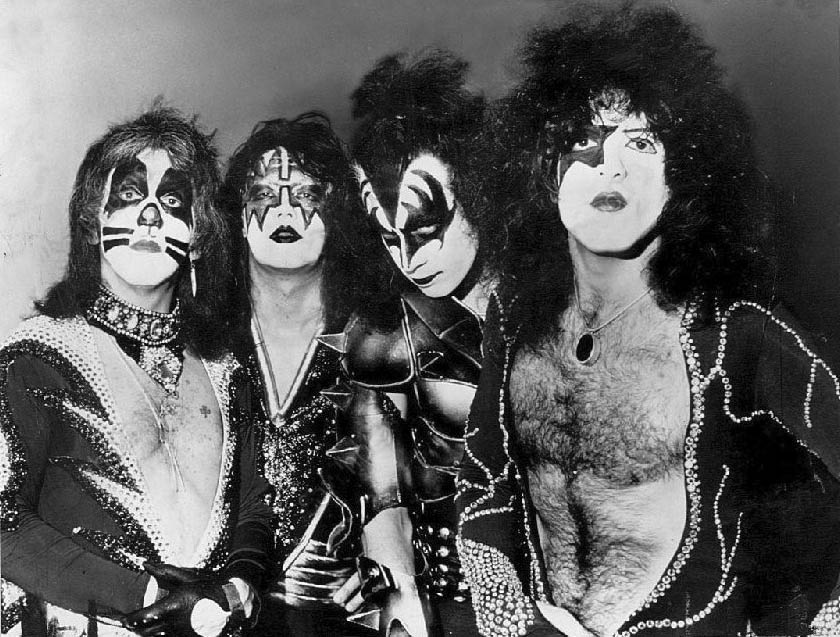
Kiss in makeup, 1976: (L–R) Peter "Catman" Criss, Ace "the Spaceman" Frehley, Gene "the Demon" Simmons, Paul "Starchild" Stanley.

Kiss

- Paul Stanley – vocals, rhythm guitar, first guitar solo on "I Want You", 12-string acoustic guitar on "I Want You" and "Hard Luck Woman"
- Gene Simmons – vocals, bass; rhythm guitar on "Ladies Room"
- Peter Criss – drums, vocals
- Ace Frehley – lead guitar, backing vocals

Production

- Eddie Kramer – producer, engineer, mixing at the Record Plant, New York City
- Corky Stasiak – engineer

== Charts ==
Chart (1976)	Peak position
Australian Albums (Kent Music Report)	16
Canada Top Albums/CDs (RPM)	7
German Albums (Offizielle Top 100)	39
Japanese Albums (Oricon)	15
Swedish Albums (Sverigetopplistan)	9
US Billboard 200	11

Chart (2025–2026)	Peak position
Finnish Physical Albums (Suomen virallinen lista)	9
German Rock & Metal Albums (Offizielle Top 100)	7
Greek Albums (IFPI)	62
Norwegian Physical Albums (IFPI Norge) Eddie Kramer 2026 mix	4

== Certifications ==
Region	Certification	Certified units/sales
Canada (Music Canada)	Platinum	100,000^{^}
Japan (RIAJ)	Gold	100,000^{^}
United States (RIAA)	Platinum	1,000,000^{^}
^{^} Shipments figures based on certification alone.
