= Hotter than Hell (album) =

Studio album by Kiss
- Released: October 22, 1974
- Recorded: August 1974
- Studios: The Village, Los Angeles
- Genres: Hard rock; heavy metal; proto-punk
- Length: 33:02
- Label: Casablanca
- Producers: Kenny Kerner, Richie Wise

Kiss chronology
Kiss (1974)	Hotter than Hell (1974)	Dressed to Kill (1975)

Singles from Hotter than Hell
- 1. "Let Me Go, Rock 'n' Roll" Released: October 22, 1974

Hotter than Hell is the second studio album by American hard rock band Kiss, released on October 22, 1974, by Casablanca Records. It was certified gold on June 23, 1977, having shipped 500,000 copies. The album was re-released in 1997 in a remastered version. It peaked on the Billboard 200 charts at No. 100, without the benefit of a hit single. Many of the album's songs were live staples for the band, including "Parasite", "Hotter than Hell", "Let Me Go, Rock 'n' Roll", and "Watchin' You".

== Composition and recording ==
The production team of Kenny Kerner and Richie Wise, who had produced the group's first album, was again chosen for the follow-up. The pair had just relocated to Los Angeles, and Kiss made the trek to the west coast to commence recording, the first the band had done outside their native state of New York. The band members, all hailing from New York City, immediately developed a dislike for their new surroundings. Paul Stanley's guitar was stolen on his first day in Los Angeles. The working title for the album was The Harder They Come.

Hotter than Hell is darker than the band's first album. This is partly due to the murkier production values, but also the lyrical content of some of the songs. "Goin' Blind", which details a doomed romance between a 93-year-old and a 16-year-old girl, was a song written by Simmons and Stephen Coronel during their days with Wicked Lester. The original title was "Little Lady", and the song's original second verse lyric, revived by Simmons for their MTV Unplugged appearance, as well as on Alive IV, suggests that the song's narrator is a sea captain addressing a mermaid.

"Got to Choose" is a hard rock song about confronting a wayward lover. "Watchin' You" is about a stalking voyeur. It has been called one of the heaviest Kiss songs.

Although the album featured two songs composed and one song co-composed by lead guitarist Ace Frehley, he did not sing on any of them; his lack of confidence in his singing abilities at that time led to Frehley delegating lead vocal duties to other members of the band, with "Parasite" and "Strange Ways" going to Gene Simmons and Peter Criss, respectively. Frehley's guitar solo on "Strange Ways" has been referred to as one of his best.

Hotter than Hell featured many more overdubs than the first album. While Kerner and Wise wanted to produce a record that captured Kiss as a live act, they decided to take advantage of the experience the band had gained as recording artists.

In an interview with Songfacts' Greg Prato in 2013, Richie Wise shouldered the blame for the album's sub-par sonics. "For whatever reason, moving to California, my head wasn't in the right place. It was more of a chore than it was out of love, that album. And my heart and soul didn't get there. I don't remember having any breathing time. It was just too much exhale. It wasn't enough [to] inhale/exhale. Not enough give and take. I was going through a bunch of changes at that time. I moved from New York to California. I'd never moved like that in my life, made a big move. It was just a big time for me, and Hotter than Hell took a back seat. And I apologize for that."

== Cover art ==
The album is well known for its striking cover designed by John Van Hamersveld. The front featured Japanese Ukiyo-e-influenced artwork, and the back cover showed individual band shots taken by Norman Seeff at a wild party overlayed by a composite of all four band members' makeup designs.

The photoshoot took place on August 18, 1974 in Los Angeles. The photo session included a wild party, at which many people allegedly got drunk.

On August 24, 1974, Ace Frehley was involved in a car accident. One day later, another photo session took place with Seeff. Due to Frehley having stitches on the left side of his face, he did the photoshoot with only half of his makeup.. Allegedly, photos from both sessions made the cover of the album.

The Japanese character on the bottom of the album cover (力) is chikara, which means "power". It would later be used on various forms of Kiss material during the 1970s and 1980s, most prominently on Eric Carr's drum kit. The Japanese characters on the top-right corner of the album cover (地獄 の さけび) are Jigoku no Sakebi, which means "shout/scream of hell" or "hell's shout/scream". The Japanese katakana characters used for each member had transliteration errors. The characters for Peter Criss are ピータ・クリース ("pita kurīsu") when it should have been ピーター・クリス pītā kurisu. Paul Stanley's last name was incorrectly transliterated as スタンリィ ("sutanryi") when it should have been スタンレー sutanrē. Gene Simmons' first name is incorrectly spelled ジイン ("jiin") when it should have been ジーン jīn, and finally Ace Frehley's first and last name were spelled エイス フューリ ("eisu fyūri") when the characters should have been エース・フレーリー ēsu furērī.

== Release and reception ==
Professional ratings
Review scores
Source	Rating
AllMusic	4/5 stars
Blender	3/5 stars
Collector's Guide to Heavy Metal	8/10
Encyclopedia of Popular Music	2/5 stars
Pitchfork	5.3/10
The New Rolling Stone Album Guide	2/5 stars
Spin Alternative Record Guide	3/10
Uncut	4/5 stars

Despite the intense touring schedule Kiss maintained in 1974, Hotter than Hell failed to outperform the band's first album and fared considerably worse. This was due partly to the fact that Casablanca's distribution deal with Warner Bros. Records had ended. The publicity push behind the album was not nearly as strong as it had been for the debut album. One notable exception was a television commercial aired to promote the album. The only single released from the album, "Let Me Go, Rock 'n' Roll", was distributed in low numbers and failed to chart. Four months after the album was released, Kiss was pulled off of the tour and called back into the studio to record a follow-up. Hotter than Hell was certified gold on June 23, 1977.

== Track listing ==
All credits adapted from the original release.

Side one
No.	Title	Writer(s)	Lead vocals	Length
1.	"Got to Choose"	Paul Stanley	Stanley	3:54
2.	"Parasite"	Ace Frehley	Gene Simmons	3:01
3.	"Goin' Blind"	Simmons, Stephen Coronel	Simmons	3:36
4.	"Hotter than Hell"	Stanley	Stanley	3:31
5.	"Let Me Go, Rock 'n' Roll"	Simmons, Stanley	Simmons	2:14

Side two
No.	Title	Writer(s)	Lead vocals	Length
1.	"All the Way"	Simmons	Simmons	3:18
2.	"Watchin' You"	Simmons	Simmons	3:43
3.	"Mainline"	Stanley	Peter Criss	3:50
4.	"Comin' Home"	Frehley, Stanley	Stanley	2:37
5.	"Strange Ways"	Frehley	Criss	3:18

== Personnel ==
Kiss

- Paul Stanley – rhythm guitar, vocals
- Gene Simmons – bass, vocals
- Peter Criss – drums, vocals
- Ace Frehley – lead guitar, bass on "Parasite", backing vocals on "Parasite" and "Strange Ways"

Production

- Kenny Kerner – producer
- Richie Wise – producer
- Warren Dewey – engineer
- Norman Seeff – photography, art direction
- John Van Hamersveld – design, art direction
- Joseph M. Palmaccio – remastering

== Charts ==
Chart (1974–1976)	Peak position
Australian Albums (Kent Music Report)	98
Canada Top Albums/CDs (RPM)	91
Japanese Albums (Oricon)	46
US Billboard 200	100

== Certifications ==
Region	Certification	Certified units/sales
United States (RIAA)	Gold	500,000^{^}
^{^} Shipments figures based on certification alone.

== Release history ==
- Casablanca NBLP-7006 (October 22, 1974): 1st LP issue
- Mercury 314 532 375-2 (July 15, 1997): Remastered CD
