= Hard Luck Woman =

1976 single by Kiss

Single by Kiss

from the album Rock and Roll Over
- B-side: "Mr. Speed"
- Released: November 1, 1976
- Genre: Folk rock
- Length: 3:35
- Label: Casablanca NB-873A (US)
- Songwriter: Paul Stanley
- Producer: Eddie Kramer

Kiss singles chronology
| "Beth" / "Detroit Rock City" (1976) | "Hard Luck Woman" / "Mr. Speed" (1976) | "Calling Dr. Love" / "Take Me" (1977) |

"Hard Luck Woman" is a song by American hard rock band Kiss and the lead single from their 1976 album, Rock and Roll Over. It was originally written by Paul Stanley as a possible track for Rod Stewart, but after the success of the soft rock ballad "Beth", Kiss decided to keep it for themselves as a follow-up. Stanley has stated his admiration and love of Stewart's music numerous times, and that "Hard Luck Woman" was inspired by Rod Stewart, in particular the songs "Maggie May" and "You Wear It Well". The nautical themed song "Brandy" by American pop-rock band Looking Glass served as Stanley's lyrical inspiration.

== Details ==
Alluding to the style of "Hard Luck Woman", Steven Bailey called the song an exemplar of "gentle folk rock".

Sung by Peter Criss, the single was an attempt to follow the success of the hit single "Beth" released earlier in the year by releasing another love song sung by Criss. According to Billboard Magazine, Criss' vocal performance sounds similar to Rod Stewart. It proved to be a top 20 hit in the US, peaking at number 15.

A version of "Hard Luck Woman" appears on Kiss's 1977 Alive II. Kiss also performed the song during their MTV Unplugged appearance with Stanley on vocals. It did not appear on the CD of the performance, but it was one of five bonus tracks on the DVD.

== Reception ==
Cash Box said that the song is moving away from heavy metal and that "the lead vocal is not unlike Rod Stewart — there's a growling, bluesy intensity, centered around acoustic rhythm work."

== Charts ==
=== Weekly charts ===
| Chart (1976–1977) | Peak position |
|---|---|
| Australian Singles (Kent Music Report) | 67 |
| Canada Top Singles (RPM) | 15 |
| Germany (GfK) | 34 |
| US Billboard Hot 100 | 15 |

=== Year-end charts ===
| Chart (1977) | Peak position |
|---|---|
| Canada Top Singles (RPM) | 135 |
| US (Joel Whitburn's Pop Annual) | 111 |

== Garth Brooks version ==
"Hard Luck Woman"

Single by Garth Brooks

from the album Kiss My Ass: Classic Kiss Regrooved
- Released: 1994
- Genre: Country
- Length: 3:14
- Label: Mercury
- Songwriter: Paul Stanley
- Producer: Allen Reynolds

Garth Brooks singles chronology
| "One Night a Day" (1994) | "Hard Luck Woman" (1994) | "Callin' Baton Rouge" (1994) |

In 1994, American country star Garth Brooks recorded the song for the tribute album Kiss My Ass: Classic Kiss Regrooved, with Kiss themselves providing the instrumentation. Kiss and Brooks performed the song on The Tonight Show with Jay Leno in promotion of the album. It peaked at number 84 on the US Cash Box Top 100.

=== Charts ===
| Chart (1994) | Peak position |
|---|---|
| Canada Top Singles (RPM) | 23 |
| Canada Adult Contemporary (RPM) | 31 |
| Canada Country Singles (RPM) | 59 |
| US Adult Contemporary (Billboard) | 28 |
| US Hot Country Songs (Billboard) | 67 |
| US Pop Airplay (Billboard) | 26 |
| US Cash Box Top 100 | 84 |

== Other versions ==
- X Japan members Toshi, hide and Pata performed a cover at Nissan Power Station on October 18, 1991.
- Japanese thrash metal band Rosenfeld covered this song on their 1994 live album In the Garden as a hidden track.
- Danish heavy metal band Pretty Maids covered this song on their 1997 album, Spooked.
- With Kanako Nakayama, Redd Kross covered this song on the 1998 tribute album, Kiss Tribute in Japan.
- Japanese pop singer Maki Nomiya covered this song on her 1999 album, Miss Maki Nomiya Sings.
- Ginger of the heavy rock band The Wildhearts covered the song on his 2001 solo live album Grievous Acoustic Behaviour.
- Giuliano Palma & The Bluebeaters did a cover version on their 2005 album Long Playing.
- Corey Taylor performed the song acoustically during his Live in London show at KOKO in on 05/08/2016.
- The Hold Steady did an electrified cover version on their 2014 covers EP, RAGS.

== Personnel ==
- Peter Criss – lead vocals, drums
- Paul Stanley – 12-string acoustic guitar, backing vocals
- Ace Frehley – acoustic guitar
- Gene Simmons – acoustic bass guitar

Alive II version

- Peter Criss – lead vocals, drums
- Paul Stanley – electric guitar, backing vocals
- Ace Frehley – electric guitar
- Gene Simmons – electric bass guitar

== In popular culture ==
- Episode 24 of the anime series Cowboy Bebop is named "Hard Luck Woman" after the song.
