= Stephen Coronel =

American guitarist (born 1951)

- Born: March 21, 1951 (age 75); New York City, U.S.
- Genre: Hard rock
- Occupation: Guitarist
- Years active: 1964–?

Stephen Coronel (born March 21, 1951) is an American guitarist and former member of the rock band Wicked Lester. He co-wrote a handful of songs that would later be recorded by the group Kiss, a band which featured former Wicked Lester members Paul Stanley and Gene Simmons. In 2014, Coronel was charged with possessing child pornography, and was incarcerated at Kershaw Correctional Institution in South Carolina from 2016 to 2019.

== Musical career ==
A veteran of several New York City-area bands such as The Long Island Sounds, Bullfrog Bheer (with Gene Simmons), Tree (with Paul Stanley), Cathedral, Coffee, and Rainbow (unrelated to the Ritchie Blackmore band of the same name), Coronel introduced Stanley to Gene Simmons at his Washington Heights apartment in the early 1970s. The trio would go on to form Wicked Lester, which later morphed into Kiss when Simmons and Stanley decided to move in a new musical direction. Not involved in the formation of Kiss, Coronel formed the band Lover. While still a member of Wicked Lester in the early 1970s, Coronel created the riff and chord structures of future Kiss songs "She" and "Goin' Blind" with Simmons.

== Sexual exploitation conviction ==
Coronel was arrested on September 26, 2014, and charged with five counts of sexual exploitation of a minor. A U.S. Department of Justice Internet Crimes Against Children Task Force investigation determined that child pornography had been uploaded from a residence in Bluffton, South Carolina.

Coronel was sentenced to six years in prison on April 27, 2016, after being found guilty of third-degree sexual exploitation of a minor. He was incarcerated at the Kershaw Correctional Institution in South Carolina.

Coronel was released from prison and placed on probation as of March 3, 2019.
