= Neil Bogart =

American record producer (1943–1982)

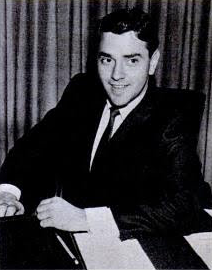
- Born: Neil Scott Bogatz; February 3, 1943; Brooklyn, New York City, New York, United States
- Died: May 8, 1982 (aged 39); Los Angeles, California, United States
- Occupation: Music executive
- Spouses: Elizabeth Weiss (m. 1965; div. 1974); Joyce Bogart (m. 1976)
- Children: 4, including Evan

Neil E. Bogart (born Neil Scott Bogatz, February 3, 1943 – May 8, 1982) was an American music executive. He was the founder of Casablanca Records, which later became Casablanca Record and Filmworks.

== Life and career ==
Born Neil Scott Bogatz in the Brooklyn Jewish Hospital, central Prospect Heights, Brooklyn, New York City, the son of Ruth (Markoff) and Al M. Bogatz. His family was Jewish. He grew up in the Glenwood Houses, a housing project in the Flatlands section of Brooklyn. He was a singer in the 1960s, using the name Neil Scott, and had a hit single, “Bobby” in 1961, prior to running the Michigan offices of Cameo-Parkway Records. Bogart discovered the group ? and the Mysterians, and produced their hit “96 Tears” in 1966. After Cameo-Parkway was shut down by the government for stock fraud in 1968, Bogart became an executive at Buddah Records. He is credited with being a key player in the rise of bubblegum pop music during his time working at Cameo-Parkway and Buddah.

Bogart started Casablanca in 1973 when he first signed Kiss and later became identified with the rise of disco by promoting the careers of acts such as Donna Summer and the Village People. The Casablanca roster also contained rock acts such as the Godz, T. Rex, Fanny, and the Hudson Brothers, but the label became best known for its disco product. The label was also known for tapping into the funk market with the signing of George Clinton's Parliament in 1974.

Shortly before his death, Bogart founded Boardwalk Records and jumped on the new wave bandwagon, as disco was in decline. Joan Jett, Night Ranger, Phil Seymour, and Harry Chapin were among his last signings.

== Death ==
Bogart's health began to deteriorate in 1981, leading to the removal of one of his kidneys and frequent trips to the hospital. Bogart died of lymphoma at age 39 in Los Angeles. He was interred at Hillside Memorial Park in Culver City, California.

== Legacy ==
Bogart's widow, Joyce Bogart-Trabulus, teamed with songwriter Carole Bayer Sager to found the Neil Bogart Memorial Fund (now the Bogart Pediatric Cancer Research Program) in 1984. That same year, the fund established its laboratories at the Children's Hospital Los Angeles. The fund was a division of the T.J. Martell Foundation until the mid-2000s.

=== In art, entertainment, and media ===
Music

- The Kiss album Creatures of the Night is dedicated to Bogart's memory (the dedication is found on the back cover of the original vinyl release of the album, near the bottom [Casablanca Records NBLP-7270]. The dedication is also found on the CD release on the inside of the insert, where the credits are located [Casablanca Records/Mercury 314-532-391-2]. The dedication simply states: "Neil Bogart 1943-1982").
- Donna Summer's self-titled album from 1982 is also dedicated to Bogart's memory, and the liner notes contain one of his favorite sayings, "Why head for the mountaintop when you're reaching for the sky?"
- Village People's 1982 album Fox on the Box was also dedicated to Bogart's memory.
- His son Evan Kidd Bogart helped discover Eminem with Dean Geistlinger at the 1997 Rap Olympics.

Films

- In the 1980 film Can't Stop the Music, actor Paul Sand plays a record executive loosely based on Bogart.
- In 2013, Justin Timberlake signed to star in the feature film Spinning Gold, a biopic of Bogart written by his son, Tim Bogart. On June 20, 2019, it was reported that Jeremy Jordan had taken over the role. The film was released on March 31, 2023.

Literature

- Going Platinum, a book about Bogart, was published in 2014. It was written by his nephew Brett Ermilio and Josh Levine and published by Globe Pequot Press.
