= Sacramento Film and Music Festival =

Film festival in Sacramento, California

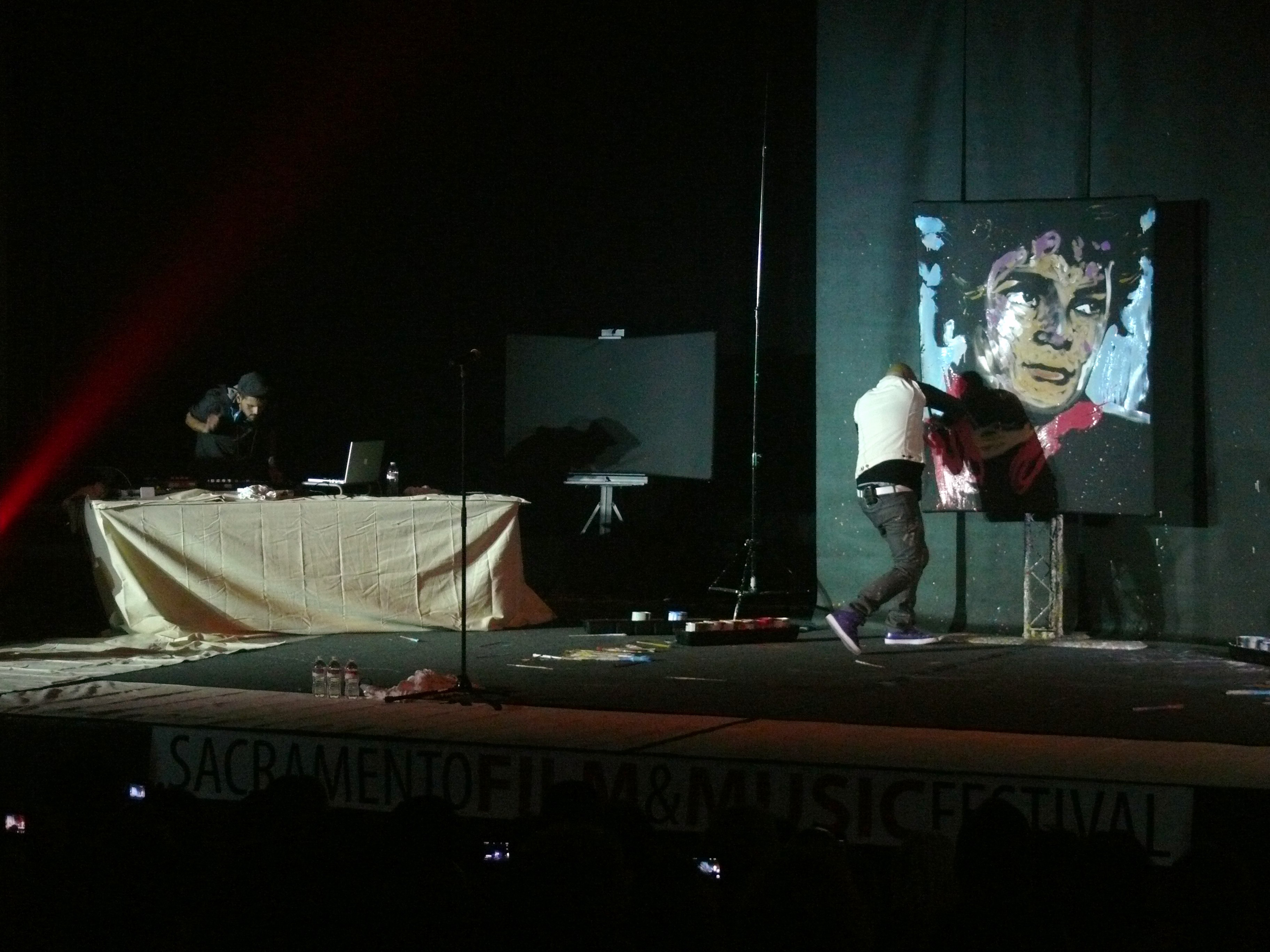
- David Garibaldi paints a portrait of Michael Jackson at the 11th festival
- Location: Sacramento, California
- Founded: 2000
- Website: Official Website Sacramento Film and Music Festival (sacfilm.com)

The Sacramento Film and Music Festival (SF&MF) is a large, multi-day, all-genre international film festival held in Sacramento, California in the United States. It has been in operation since 2000. The festival's mission is to celebrate filmmaking from around the world and sponsor the art of film in California's Capital region.

== History ==
For the 2011 season, the festival's 12th, the event was divided into two parts with the WinterFEST January 15–17 and the SummerFEST August 18–21. The WinterFEST dates coincided with the Martin Luther King holiday weekend and in addition to the usual range of film programming, the program documentaries with themes of politics, peace, and social justice including "Sowing the Seeds of Justice" about the life and legal career of Cruz Reynoso.

The 2010 festival dates were July 23 - August 1, opening with the feature documentary "Official Rejection" about the difficulties of getting films into film festivals. In a special program on July 29, the 2010 Festival included the world premiere of "Walking Dreams" a documentary about the work of artist David Garibaldi, followed by a live performance of his work and a charity auction. In a performance of career significance, and in front of 600 attendees, David painted his first large format self-portrait. The five paintings created during the evening were sold, following the performance, with the proceeds benefiting both the festival and the Friends of the Sacramento Metropolitan Arts Commission.

The 2009 festival ran July 24 - Sunday, August 2. The 10th festival opened with a premiere screening of the independent feature, "Sensored" starring Robert Picardo and shot entirely on the Red One ultra-high definition digital camera.

The festival kicked off 2009 with a Sac Music Seen New Year's Eve at the Crest Theatre with live music from The Dirty Feet and Autumn Sky, selected local music videos from the festival's own music video production program and a program of short films.

The 2008 festival dates were Friday, August 8 - Sunday, August 17. The 2008 festival included 17 feature films, over 100 short films and video projects, eight musical acts, two industry presentations, a pitch session, 30 ticketed events and the presentation of 25 awards. In a Gold Circle Series Screening, the festival hosted the West Coast premiere of UNCOUNTED: The New Math of American Elections. Filmmaker David Earnhardt was joined by radio host Peter B. Collins and political commentator Brad Friedman for a discussion regarding the film's topics of voting integrity and election fraud.

In 2007, the eighth annual festival welcomed guests Larry Meistrich, principle of NEHST Studios and producer of such movies as the Academy Award winning Sling Blade and You Can Count On Me; Mike DiManno and Scott Reid, CEO and President respectively of Redwood Palms Pictures; and writer/director Joe Carnahan. During the 2007 Festival, 99 films were screened in competition, plus five short movies produced for The Sacramento Bee. In an eight-hour marathon pitch session, Larry Meistrich met with filmmakers and prospective filmmakers, directly resulting in four development deals.

In 2007, the festival added the marquee sponsor Sactown Magazine, in a relationship that lasted three seasons.

In 2006, the seventh annual festival featured over 90 film and video projects and four live bands over five days, including the special programs Sac Music Seen (a local music video production program), the 10x10 Filmmaker Challenge (a 10-day filmmaking program), and Student Days (a student film festival within the larger event). The Sac Music Seen program was supported by a grant from the Sacramento Metropolitan Arts Commission in recognition of its contributions to the arts community and support of both local musicians and filmmakers. SFMF was voted Sacramento's "Best Film Festival" by readers of the Sacramento News and Review.

In 2004, in its fifth year, SF&MF was recognized by both Sacramento's Mayor Heather Fargo and California's Governor Arnold Schwarzenegger for its achievements and contributions to the community.

== Submissions and programming ==
The Sacramento Film and Music Festival is submission-based and highly selective, accepting films in all genres and of all lengths, from anywhere in the world. Programs are determined based on the nature of submissions received and the opinions of the screening committee. A separate film jury determines award winners, in addition to the audience awards.

== Sac Music Seen ==
The Sac Music Seen program pairs local musicians and bands with local filmmakers to produce music videos. While the larger festival also accepts music videos for general programming, Sac Music Seen has been supported by such entities as the Sacramento Metropolitan Arts Commission and the Sacramento Bee. In the first seven years of the program's existence (2004-2010), it produced 150 original music videos.

== 10x10 Filmmaker Challenge ==
In anotherSF&MF program, the 10x10 filmmakers are given 10 days to make a movie of no more than 10 minutes on a given theme. The program started as a midnight screening experiment in 2004 with seven films on the topic of "the Undead and the Seven Deadly Sins". Up to 2009, approximately 70 originals projects have been completed and screened and the program has become the closing event of the Festival.

== Sony Creative Software Student Days ==
Added to the festival in 2006, Student Days is a program that shows the works of student filmmakers. The first Student Days program featured 20 projects over two afternoons and included works from the American Film Institute, Chapman University, Columbia College Chicago, New York University, Pasadena's Art Center College of Design, the University of California Los Angeles, the University of Central Florida, and the University of Southern California. The event was renamed Sony Creative Software Student Days prior to the 2007 festival, in recognition of support by the creators of the Vegas, Acid, Sound Forge, and Cinescore family of editing products.

== The Sacramento Alliance of Film Festivals ==
The Sacramento Film and Music Festival is a member of the Sacramento Alliance of Film Festivals, along with the following partner events:

- A Place Called Sacramento - a screenwriting and filmmaking program of Access Sacramento
- The Sacramento Japanese Film Festival
- The Sacramento French Film Festival
- The Sacramento International Gay and Lesbian Film Festival
- The Sacramento Jewish Film Festival
