= Sonic Boom over Europe Tour =

2010 concert tour by Kiss

Sonic Boom over Europe: From the Beginning to the Boom
- Concert by Kiss
- Associated album: Sonic Boom
- Start date: May 1, 2010
- End date: June 27, 2010
- No. of shows: 36

Kiss concert chronology
- Alive 35 World Tour (2008–2009); Sonic Boom Over Europe Tour (2010); The Hottest Show on Earth Tour (2010–2011)

The Sonic Boom over Europe Tour (full title: Sonic Boom over Europe: From the Beginning to the Boom) was a concert tour by American rock band Kiss in support of their 19th studio album Sonic Boom, which was released in October 2009.

The tour started in Sheffield, England at the Sheffield Arena in early May and concluded at the Graspop Metal Meeting Festival in Dessel, Belgium in late June. The leg marked the band's first tour of indoor arenas in the United Kingdom since 1996, their first show in Ireland since 1988, and their debut concert in Slovakia. The group performed at a number of music festivals on the tour, including the Rock am Ring and Rock im Park Festivals, Sauna Open Air Metal Festival and Hellfest.

Each show was recorded and sold to fans on a USB flash drive following the concert.

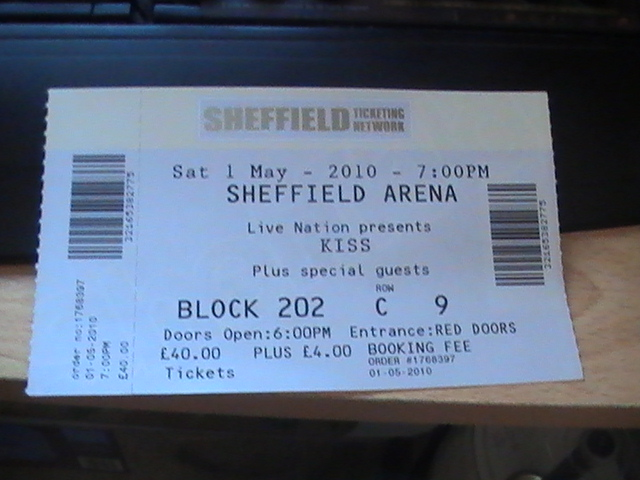
Ticket for the Sheffield, England show

Before the start of the tour, the group played a promotional show at the Islington Academy in London on March 2, 2010, to about 800 people. Three songs had to be cut from the 15-song set due to issues with the CO_{2} canisters used to release confetti during "Rock and Roll All Nite".

A subsequent tour entitled The Hottest Show on Earth Tour followed in late July 2010, reaching North American markets.

In the tour program for the band's final tour, Singer reflected on the tour:

Tommy and myself are in a unique position because we grew up as Kiss fans and ended up playing with Kiss so that's a kind of different perspective that Gene and Paul will never have. I don't think there's anyone else who playing in Kiss besides Tommy and myself that really were truly Kiss fans when they were younger.

== Set list ==
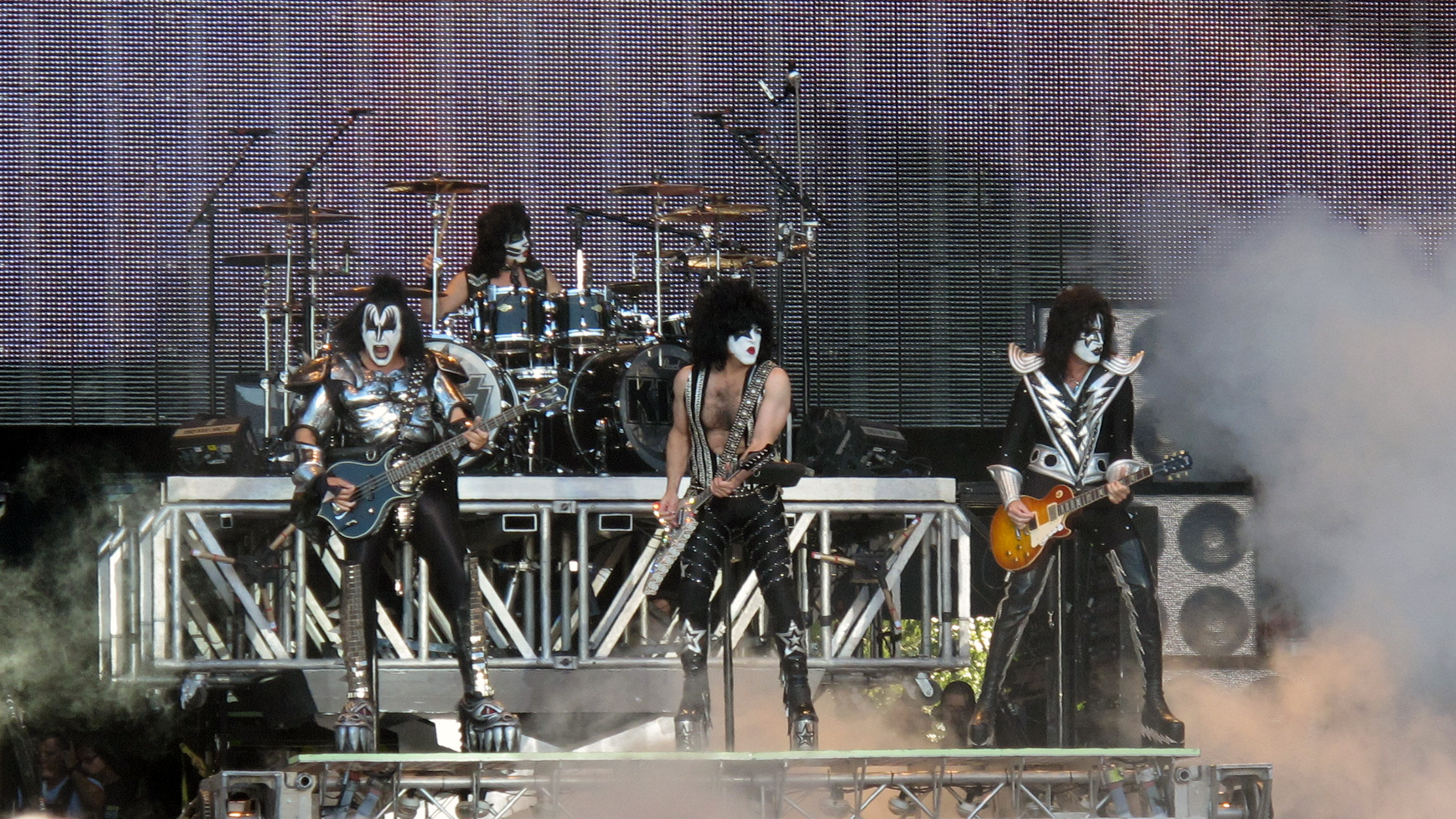
Kiss onstage during the Sauna Open Air date in Tampere, Finland

The set list featured three songs from Sonic Boom: "Modern Day Delilah", "Say Yeah" and "I'm an Animal". Also included was "Crazy Crazy Nights", performed live for the first time since the Hot in the Shade Tour in 1990. Beginning with the date in Hamburg, Germany, "Beth" was added to the set list. It was the first time the song was performed live since the World Domination Tour in 2003 and the first time it was performed acoustically since Kiss' appearance on MTV Unplugged in 1995.

Main set list
1. "Modern Day Delilah"
2. "Cold Gin"
3. "Let Me Go, Rock 'n' Roll"
4. "Firehouse"
5. "Say Yeah"
6. "Deuce"
7. "Crazy Crazy Nights"
8. "Calling Dr. Love"
9. "Shock Me" (Tommy and Eric jam and solos)
10. "I'm an Animal"
11. "100,000 Years"
12. "I Love It Loud" (Gene spits blood and flies)
13. "Love Gun" ^{[1]}
14. "Black Diamond"
15. "Detroit Rock City"

Encores:

1. "Beth"
2. "Lick It Up" (with bridge from "Won't Get Fooled Again") ^{[1]}
3. "Shout It Out Loud" ^{[1]}
4. "I Was Made for Lovin' You" (Paul flies to B-stage)
5. "God Gave Rock 'N' Roll to You II"
6. "Rock and Roll All Nite"

"Beth" is only played for a few dates of the tour

- 1 Omitted in Vienna and Ostrava.
- 2 Performed on all dates from May 31 to June 25, 2010.
Promo show set list
(London, Islington Academy, March 2, 2010)
1. "Modern Day Delilah"
2. "Cold Gin"
3. "Let Me Go, Rock 'n' Roll"
4. "Say Yeah"
5. "Calling Dr. Love"
6. "Got to Choose"
7. "I Love It Loud"
8. "100,000 Years"
9. "Love Gun"
10. "Black Diamond"
11. "Rock and Roll All Nite"
12. "Detroit Rock City"

== Tour dates ==
List of 2010 concerts
Date	City	Country	Venue
May 1, 2010	Sheffield	England	Sheffield Arena
May 2, 2010	Newcastle	England	Metro Radio Arena
May 4, 2010	Liverpool	England	Echo Arena
May 5, 2010	Birmingham	England	LG Arena
May 7, 2010	Dublin	Ireland	The O_{2}
May 9, 2010	Glasgow	Scotland	SECC
May 10, 2010	Manchester	England	Evening News Arena
May 12, 2010	London	England	Wembley Arena
May 13, 2010	London	England	Wembley Arena
May 16, 2010	Zürich	Switzerland	Hallenstadion
May 17, 2010	Geneva	Switzerland	SEG Geneva Arena
May 18, 2010	Milan	Italy	Mediolanum Forum
May 20, 2010	Vienna	Austria	Wiener Stadthalle
May 21, 2010	Ostrava	Czech Republic	ČEZ Aréna
May 23, 2010	Prague	Czech Republic	O_{2} Arena
May 25, 2010	Leipzig	Germany	Arena Leipzig
May 26, 2010	Berlin	Germany	O_{2} World
May 28, 2010	Budapest	Hungary	Papp László Sportaréna
May 29, 2010	Bratislava	Slovakia	Štadión Pasienky
May 31, 2010	Hamburg	Germany	O_{2} World
June 1, 2010	Oberhausen	Germany	König Pilsener Arena
June 3, 2010	Nürburgring	Germany	Rock am Ring Festival
June 5, 2010	Nuremberg	Germany	Rock im Park Festival
June 8, 2010	Trondheim	Norway	Lerkendal Stadion
June 10, 2010	Tampere	Finland	Sauna Open Air Metal Festival
June 12, 2010	Stockholm	Sweden	Olympiastadion
June 13, 2010	Malmö	Sweden	Malmö Stadion
June 14, 2010	Oslo	Norway	Vallhall Arena
June 16, 2010	Aalborg	Denmark	Gigantium
June 18, 2010	Arnhem	Netherlands	GelreDome
June 20, 2010	Clisson	France	Hellfest
June 22, 2010	Madrid	Spain	Palacio de Deportes
June 24, 2010	Barcelona	Spain	Palau Sant Jordi
June 25, 2010	Vitoria-Gasteiz	Spain	Azkena Rock Festival
June 27, 2010	Dessel	Belgium	Graspop Metal Meeting Festival
