= Airiel Down =

American rock band

- Origin: Raleigh, North Carolina, USA
- Genres: Indie Rock, melodic rock, alternative rock
- Years active: 2003–2011
- Label: Autumn Rain Records
- Members: Lani Abe; Michael Abe; Beaux Foy; Gordon Harris; Taylor Traversari
- Website: airieldown.net

Airiel Down is an American rock band from Raleigh, North Carolina. The band consists of lead vocalist Beaux Foy, drummer Taylor Traversari, guitarist Michael Abe, bassist Lani Abe, and guitarist Gordon Harris. The group released its debut album, Vision, in 2006, which garnered acclaim from critics for its tight rhythms, high energy, and first-rate musicianship. Their 2009 album, Shine, received the same kind of praise and included the song "Hurricane Warning," which is played at every Carolina Hurricanes home game. The band has toured nationwide with groups such as Shinedown, Gin Blossoms, 38 Special, Better Than Ezra, Goo Goo Dolls and Buckcherry. As winners of a contest sponsored by Guitar Center, they also opened for Kiss at a 2010 show in Raleigh.

The band is known as an independent group, with members personally handling nearly every aspect of management. They formed their own production company and record label, Autumn Rain Records, Inc. in 2003. Benjamin Ray of popular music reviewing site The Daily Vault called the band "one of the hardest-working indie bands in the country.”

== History ==
=== 2003–2010: early years and Vision ===
Airiel Down was formed in 2003 in Raleigh, North Carolina. Their name and logo were chosen as something that represents an aerial view looking down on the world, and the unique spelling was chosen to bring to light attention to detail as they toured the national club circuit.

In 2006, after several years of live shows and touring, the band released their first album, Vision, through their own record label, Autumn Rain Records. Vision was mastered by Greg Calbi of Sterling Sound. The album received very positive reviews upon release; critics like Benjamin Ray of The Daily Vault gave the album a B+ rating, calling it a "very promising and enjoyable debut." Other reviewers, like Jayson Jones of HotIndieNews.com highlighted the "simple yet effective lyrics" and the song structures, reminiscent of classic rock. Both reviewers noted the blending of several styles of alternative and rock music.

=== 2010–2011: Shine ===
Shine, the band's second album, was recorded between two general dates and released in 2009. Like Vision, it was recorded there and mastered by Calbi, but it produced several more notable songs. "Gorilla," the album's opening track, was written about gorilla conservation. Its music video was rendered using 3D animation and showed numerous jungle animals taking a stand against human development. "Air" was the official theme song of the Olympic Park and Olympic Village at the 2010 Winter Olympics in Vancouver. This provided huge exposure for the band, as hundreds of thousands of visitors and athletes from over eighty countries heard the song throughout the Olympic Games.

The album also included perhaps the band's most well-known song, Hurricane Warning. The song, which is played at every Carolina Hurricanes home game in the RBC Center, had its origins in the 1990s and was inspired by the storms that North Carolinians are frequently forced to endure, specifically Hurricane Fran. In a 2010 interview with Social The Magazine, Foy stated that "It made it onto an album, and [the Hurricanes] heard it, loved it, and asked to use it. Of course we said yes, and then offered to do them one better, and so we cut a new version with 'Carolina Hurricanes' in the lyrics, just for the team. We licensed the song to Fox Sports, and it’s played on TV regularly."

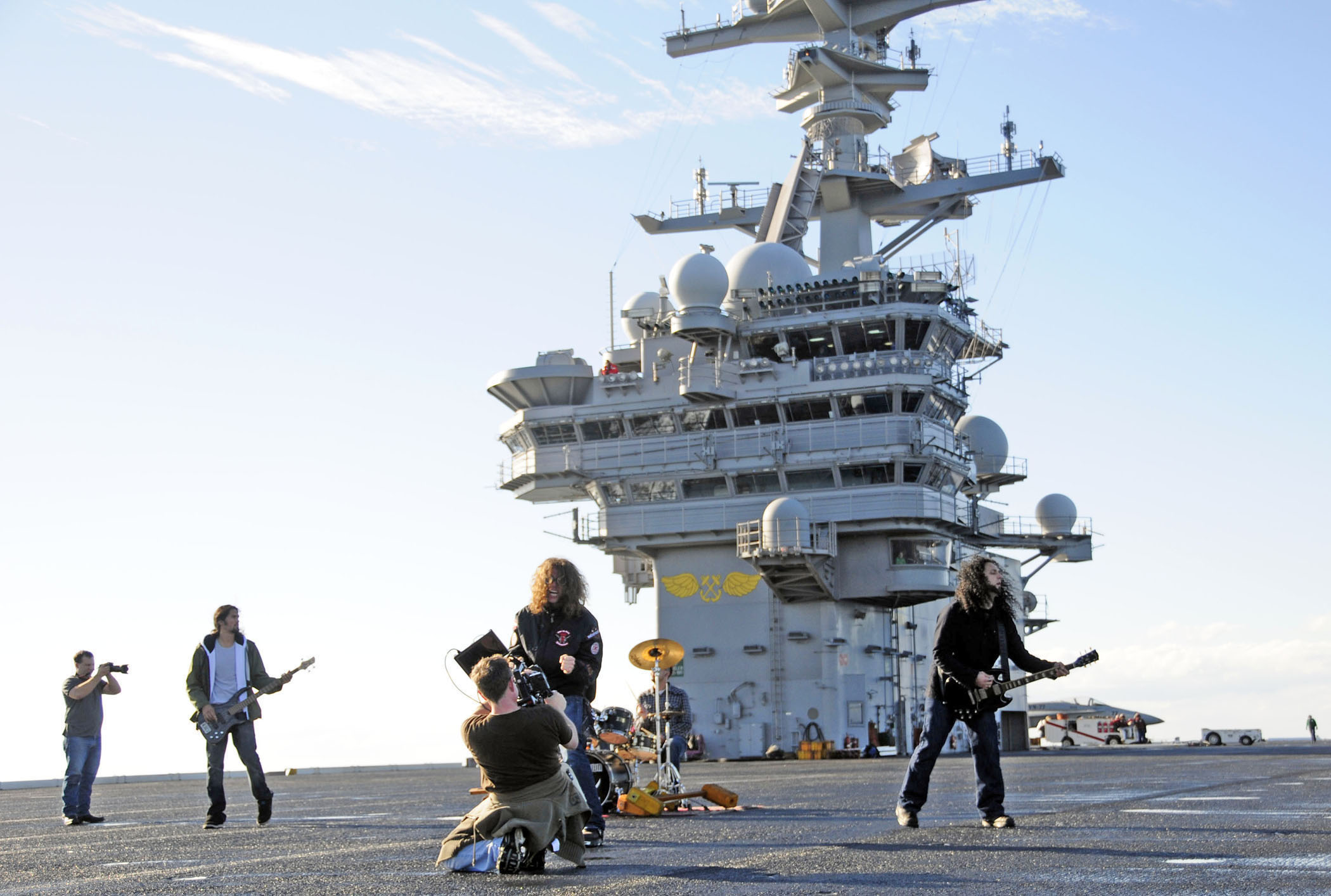
Airiel Down filming a music video on the flight deck of the aircraft carrier USS George H.W. Bush (CVN 77). George H.W. Bush is conducting training in the Atlantic Ocean.

The music video for their song "Black Flag" made history, as it was filmed entirely on an aircraft carrier at sea. The video was shot on board the USS George H. W. Bush while at sea and featured the band playing on the flight deck with different aircraft flying close by. A second video showed various clips of the band and featured an acoustic version of the song.

In 2010, the band entered the Guitar Center Onstage: Kiss Contest. Winners would be given the opportunity to open for the band at one show in their own hometown. Airiel Down was one of twenty-two bands selected as winners, and, on August 29, 2010, performed four songs live at the Time Warner Cable Music Pavilion in Raleigh as part of The Hottest Show on Earth Tour.

== Discography ==
Studio Albums

- Vision (2006)
- Shine (2009)

== Awards ==
In a testament to the band's hard work and dedication to the military, the United Service Organization of North Carolina awarded frontman Beaux Foy with North Carolina's first Heart of a Patriot award. The award, which was received in October 2011, recognized both the band's work ethic and their commitment to giving back. John Falkenbury, USO of North Carolina President said that “Beaux is determined, passionate, has an understanding of community and is committed to giving back. While his passion is music, his mission is to serve and give back to those that sacrifice for our freedom.” The award has also been given to actors Gary Sinise and Karri Turner in Illinois, along with many other USO supporters.

Foy himself said that, “It's an honor to be recognized with the Heart of a Patriot Award, but really, what we do is small in comparison. I am deeply honored to be recognized and I look forward to representing USO of North Carolina in the best way I know how.”

In 2010, music videos from the album Shine also won several AVA Video Awards, which recognize “excellence in audio and visual production.” “Silhouette,” “Hurricane Warning,” and “Gorilla” all won platinum awards, while “Quick” and “Air” won gold awards.
