= David Garibaldi =

David Garibaldi may refer to:

- David Garibaldi (musician) (born 1946), American musician, member of the band Tower of Power
- David Garibaldi (artist) (born 1982), American performance artist, known for rapidly creating paintings of rock musicians
