= The Hottest Show on Earth Tour =

2010–2011 concert tour by Kiss

- Tour by Kiss
- Associated album: Sonic Boom
- Start date: July 23, 2010
- End date: July 28, 2011
- Legs: 2
- No. of shows: 58

Kiss concert chronology
- Sonic Boom over Europe Tour (2010); The Hottest Show on Earth Tour (2010–2011); The Tour (2012)

The Hottest Show on Earth Tour was a concert tour by Kiss in support of their 19th studio album, Sonic Boom. It is essentially the North American leg of the Sonic Boom over Europe Tour, itself a continuation of the Kiss Alive/35 World Tour that started in 2008. Kiss also played in Mexico for the first time since 2004. The tour featured both arena and amphitheater shows throughout the United States, plus Canada, and was produced by Live Nation. As with previous concert tours, live recordings of every show were sold at the venue by SymfyLive.

Kiss also stated that one dollar from each ticket sold would be donated to the United States Armed Forces to benefit the Wounded Warriors Project. Kiss also added more shows to the tour in Puerto Rico, Houston, and Hollywood, Florida. Kiss announced seven shows to be added to the tour as a small Japanese tour however these shows have now been postponed to later in the year. The opening bands for the concert were The Academy Is..., Bad City, The Envy and a local act for every city, winner of a contest held by Guitar Center.

In the tour program for the band's final tour, Stanley reflected on the tour:

The idea is that I'm out there and I'm able to do this and that there's an audience that wants to see it makes it incredibly satisfying for me. I'll never disappoint them. But I'm only part of the equation, the other part of the equation is the audience. My philosophy is when people pay for a ticket, if you agree to do a show the last thing you should be doing is making excuses for not doing your job. If you can't do your job go home, but if you're gonna go up onstage you better give a hundred percent and make sure it's what people expect.

== Set list ==
According to kissonline.com, the official website of the band, Kiss will perform such classics as "Detroit Rock City" and "Rock and Roll All Nite" as well as hits that they haven't played in the US in many years. The set list is almost identical to the previous European tour, including three songs from Sonic Boom and the song "Crazy Crazy Nights", which hasn't been played live (except during their last European tour) since 1990. The setlist below started the tour in Cheyenne, Wyoming.

1. "Modern Day Delilah"
2. "Cold Gin"
3. "Let Me Go, Rock 'n' Roll"
4. "Firehouse" (Gene breathes fire)
5. "Say Yeah"
6. "Deuce"
7. "Crazy Crazy Nights"
8. "Calling Dr. Love"
9. "Shock Me" (Tommy and Eric jamming together)
10. "I'm an Animal"
11. "100,000 Years"
12. "I Love It Loud" (Gene spits blood and flies)
13. "Love Gun"
14. "Black Diamond" (Paul solo and excerpt from "Whole Lotta Love" before "Black Diamond")
15. "Detroit Rock City"

Encore

16. "Beth"
17. "Lick It Up" (with bridge from "Won't Get Fooled Again")
18. "Shout It Out Loud"
19. "I Was Made for Lovin' You" (Paul flies to B-Stage)
20. "God Gave Rock 'N' Roll to You II"
21. "Rock and Roll All Nite"

=== Lost Cities Tour set list ===
1. "Modern Day Delilah"
2. "Cold Gin"
3. "Let Me Go, Rock 'n' Roll"
4. "Firehouse" (Gene breathes fire)
5. "Say Yeah"
6. "Deuce"
7. "Do You Love Me"
8. "Calling Dr. Love"
9. "Shock Me" (Tommy and Eric jamming together)
10. "I Love It Loud"
11. "Love Gun"
12. "God of Thunder" (Gene spits blood)
13. "Black Diamond" (Paul solo and excerpt from "Stairway to Heaven" before "Black Diamond")
14. "Detroit Rock City"

Encore

15. "Beth"
16. "Lick It Up" (with bridge from "Won't Get Fooled Again")
17. "Shout It Out Loud"
18. "Rock and Roll All Nite"

== Tour dates ==
List of 2010 concerts
Date	City	Country	Venue
July 23, 2010	Cheyenne	United States	Cheyenne Frontier Days
July 24, 2010	Minot	United States	North Dakota State Fair
July 29, 2010	Burgettstown	United States	First Niagara Pavilion
July 30, 2010	Cincinnati	United States	Riverbend Music Center
July 31, 2010	Hershey	United States	Hersheypark Stadium
August 6, 2010	Camden	United States	Susquehanna Bank Center
August 7, 2010	Mansfield	United States	Comcast Center
August 9, 2010	Indianapolis	United States	Indiana State Fair
August 10, 2010	Sault Ste. Marie	Canada	Essar Centre
August 13, 2010	Corfu	United States	Darien Lake Performing Arts Center
August 14, 2010	Wantagh	United States	Nikon at Jones Beach Theater
August 15, 2010	Scranton	United States	Toyota Pavilion
August 17, 2010	Saratoga Springs	United States	Saratoga Performing Arts Center
August 19, 2010	Uncasville	United States	Mohegan Sun Arena
August 20, 2010	Holmdel	United States	PNC Bank Arts Center
August 21, 2010	Bristow	United States	Jiffy Lube Live
August 27, 2010	Virginia Beach	United States	Virginia Beach Amphitheater
August 28, 2010	Charlotte	United States	Verizon Wireless Amphitheatre
August 29, 2010	Raleigh	United States	Time Warner Cable Music Pavilion
August 31, 2010	Atlanta	United States	Aaron's Amphitheatre at Lakewood
September 2, 2010	Milwaukee	United States	Marcus Amphitheater
September 3, 2010	Tinley Park	United States	First Midwest Bank Amphitheatre
September 4, 2010	Saint Paul	United States	Minnesota State Fair
September 10, 2010	Toronto	Canada	Molson Amphitheatre
September 11, 2010	Clarkston	United States	DTE Energy Music Theatre
September 12, 2010	Cuyahoga Falls	United States	Blossom Music Center
September 17, 2010	The Woodlands	United States	Cynthia Woods Mitchell Pavilion
September 18, 2010	Frisco	United States	Pizza Hut Park
September 19, 2010	San Antonio	United States	AT&T Center
September 22, 2010	Sandy	United States	Rio Tinto Stadium
September 24, 2010	Phoenix	United States	Cricket Wireless Pavilion
September 25, 2010	Fontana	United States	Epicenter
September 28, 2010	Monterrey	Mexico	Teatro Banamex
September 30, 2010	Mexico City	Mexico	Palacio de los Deportes
October 1, 2010	Mexico City	Mexico	Palacio de los Deportes
October 2, 2010	Guadalajara	Mexico	Arena VFG

List of 2011 concerts
Date	City	Country	Venue
March 12, 2011	San Juan	Puerto Rico	José Miguel Agrelot Coliseum
March 15, 2011	Houston	United States	Houston Livestock Show and Rodeo
March 17, 2011	Hollywood	United States	Hard Rock Live
May 29, 2011	Sacramento	United States	Rock'n Walk For Kids
June 23, 2011	Everett	United States	Comcast Arena at Everett
June 24, 2011	Spokane	United States	Spokane Arena
June 26, 2011	Kamloops	Canada	Interior Savings Centre
June 27, 2011	Abbotsford	Canada	Abbotsford Centre
June 29, 2011	Prince George	Canada	CN Centre
June 30, 2011	Dawson Creek	Canada	EnCana Events Centre
July 2, 2011	Fort McMurray	Canada	Canada Rock Festival
July 6, 2011	Sarnia	Canada	Sarnia Bayfest
July 9, 2011	Grand Falls-Windsor	Canada	Salmon Festival
July 12, 2011	Manchester	United States	Verizon Wireless Arena
July 13, 2011	Bushkill	United States	Mountain Laurel Center
July 15, 2011	Walker	United States	Moondance Jam
July 16, 2011	Oshkosh	United States	Rock USA Festival
July 18, 2011	Springfield	United States	Prairie Capital Convention Center
July 24, 2011	Montreal	Canada	Heavy Montréal
July 26, 2011	Orillia	Canada	Casino Rama
July 27, 2011	Windsor	Canada	Caesars Windsor
July 28, 2011	Verona	United States	Turning Stone Events Center

== Personnel ==
=== Kiss ===
- Paul Stanley – vocals, rhythm guitar
- Gene Simmons – vocals, bass
- Tommy Thayer – lead guitar, vocals
- Eric Singer – drums, vocals
