= Crest Theatre =

Historic theater in Sacramento, California

- Empress Theatre, Hippodrome
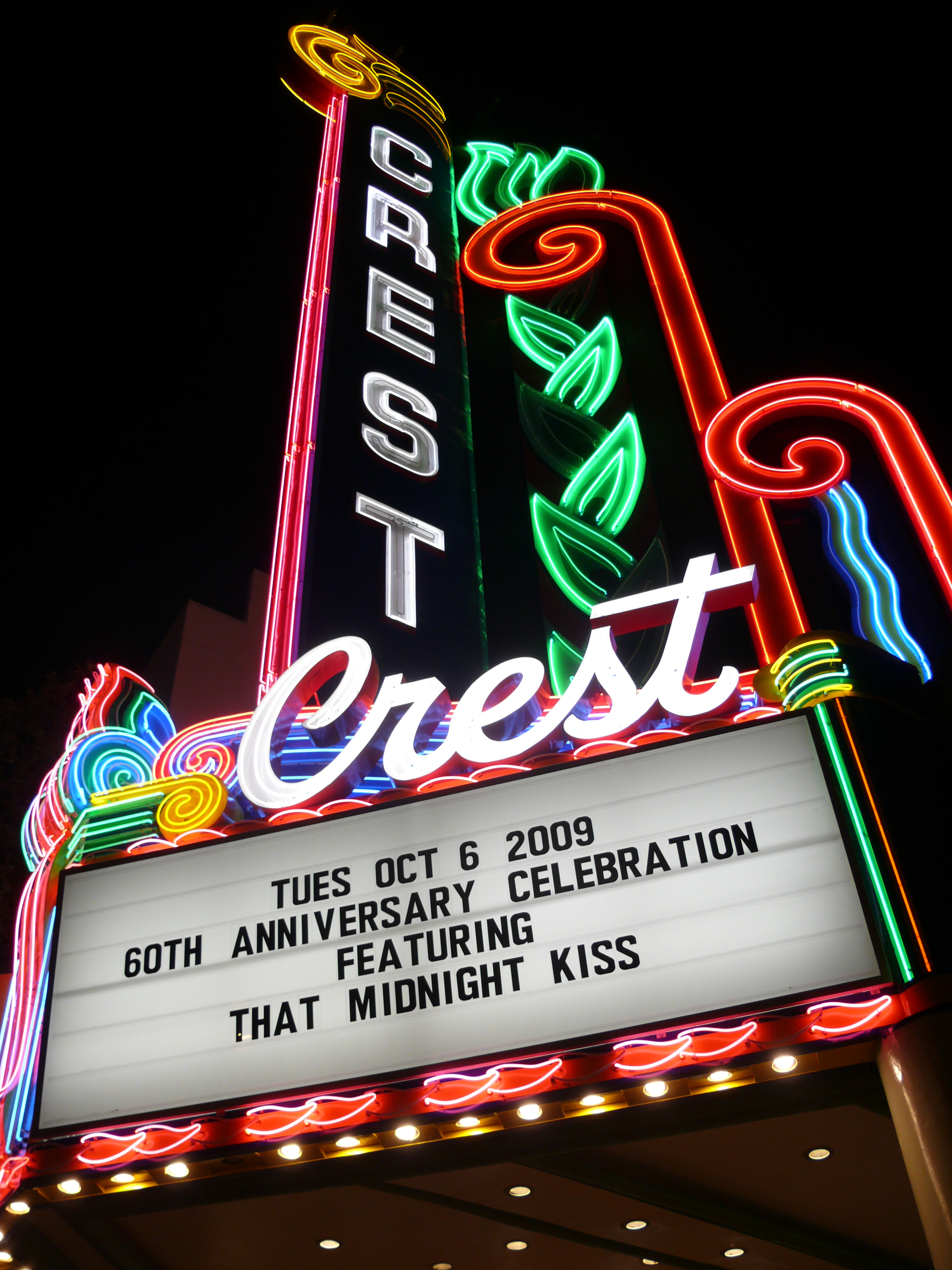
- The fully restored Crest Theatre marquee on the 60th Anniversary - showing the same film that played on opening night October 6, 1949.
- Interactive map of Crest Theatre
- Address: 1013 K Street; Sacramento, California; United States
- Coordinates: 38.57934°N 121.49313°W
- Capacity: 975

Construction
- Opened: 1912
- Rebuilt: 1949, 1995

Website
- www.crestsacramento.com

The Crest Theatre is a historic theatre located in downtown Sacramento, California.

== History ==
It originally opened in 1912 as the Empress Theatre, and at that time was used as a vaudeville palace. It later became the Hippodrome. On September 14, 1946, the Hippodrome's marquee suddenly fell to the pavement below, killing a bystander, Mrs. Jessie Shirley Potter, 41, of Alta, who was crushed beneath the marquee. Joseph Brady, 40, was struck a glancing blow and sustained a skull fracture, broken collarbone, permanent brain injury and loss of hearing in one ear. Damages of $176,334.50 were sought by Potter's family and by Brady in superior court.

Shortly after the tragedy, in 1949, the building was completely remodeled and revamped to its current form as the Crest Theatre. During the 1950s and 1960s, it was one of the premier first-run movie palaces in the Sacramento area. As the decade turned to the 1970s, it was reduced to mostly sub-run fare. In the early 1980s, the Crest closed down for a time while several attempts were made to revive the theatre in many forms, including a dinner theatre. Finally, by the end of 1995, the Crest was completely refurbished and today its main auditorium (which has been left in its post-1946 unaltered state) is a multi-purpose theatre showing classic revival and specialty films, occasional live shows and lectures. Two additional, smaller cinemas were built adjacent to the original site around the time of the remodeling. The two subterranean theaters were closed in the 2010s and replaced by Empress Tavern in 2015.

== Events at theatre ==
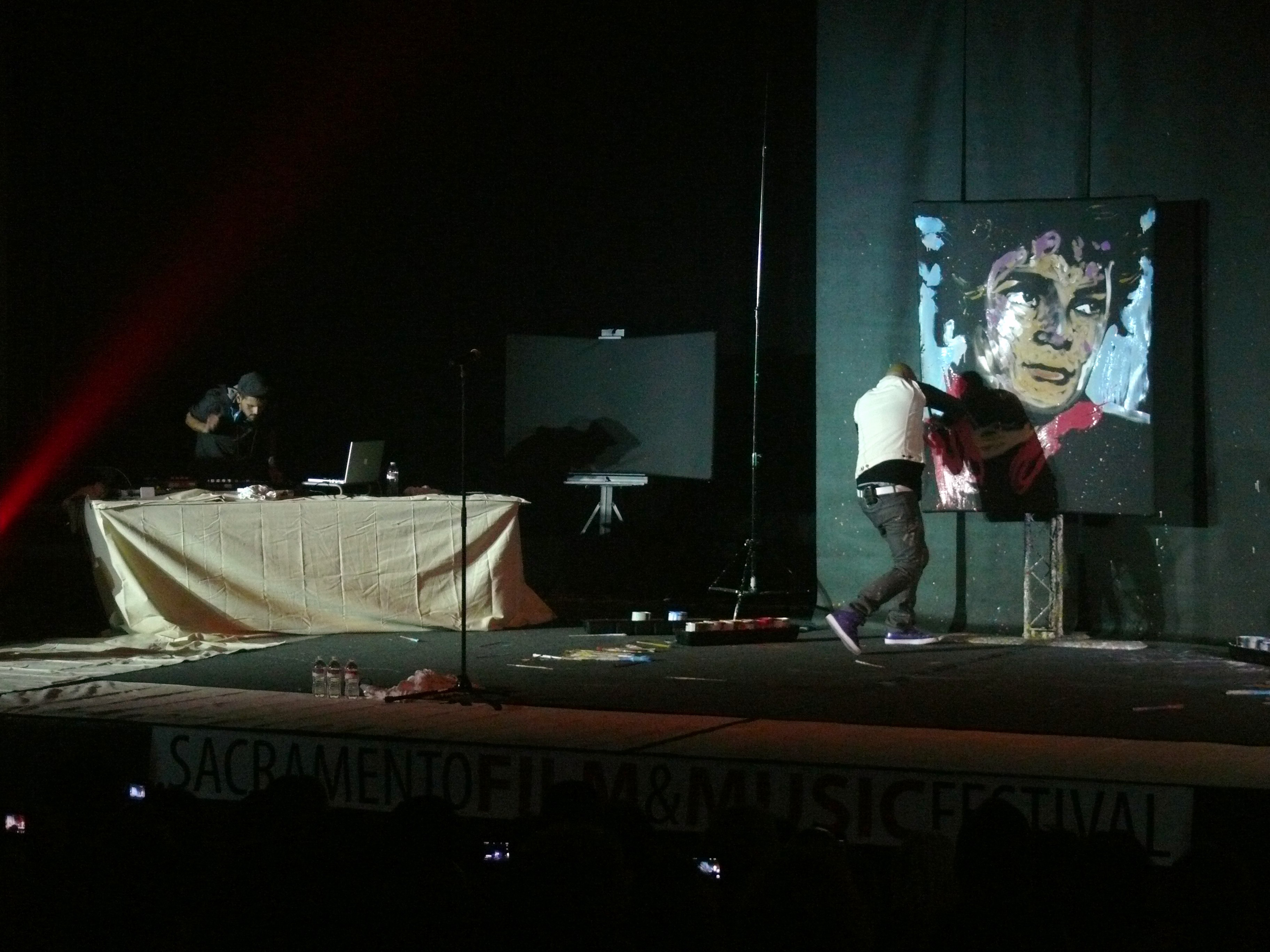
David Garibaldi paints a portrait of Michael Jackson at the 11th Annual Sacramento Film & Music Festival - July 29th, 2010 - at the Crest Theatre.

=== The Trash Film Orgy ===
The Trash Film Orgy is an annual event extending through six weeks in the summer, with occasional Halloween and Christmas shows. It features cult cinema, live stage shows, live bands, local films, carnival-type games, a lounge, and audience participation. Live guests are occasionally featured and have included filmmaker Ray Dennis Steckler, actor Sid Haig and others. The current ownership has stopped hosting this event.

=== Sacramento French Film Festival ===
The Sacramento French Film Festival, founded in 2001, is an annual event held in July at the Crest Theatre. It celebrates the present as well as the rich history of French cinema featuring new releases and rarely seen classics. It is the only festival dedicated to French cinema in Northern California and one of only two on the West coast.

=== Sacramento Jewish Film Festival ===
This is a film festival that takes place annually at the Crest. It is now in its 10th year. The two co-founders are Margi Park-Landau and Sid Heberger, the manager of the Crest. Park-Landau wanted to create a place closer to Sacramento where Jewish films could be shown. All the films shown at the film festival relate to the Jewish experience in one way or another. Guest speakers, live music, and a nosh are all part of this two-day event.

=== Sacramento Film and Music Festival ===
The Sacramento Film and Music Festival is an international submission-based film festival combined with local programs for both filmmakers and musicians. In 2008, the festival expanded to ten days with all programs hosted at the Crest Theatre. For its 12th year, in 2011, the festival has divided into two seasonal events: WinterFEST in January and SummerFEST in August, with both events continuing to include all genres and lengths of film.

== Concerts ==
Crest Theatre has hosted numerous concerts with bands such as X, Cab Calloway, John Hiatt, Cyndi Lauper, Dinosaur Jr., Guns N' Roses, Nirvana, Sonic Youth, The Smashing Pumpkins, Shawn Mendes, Pixies, Slayer, Los Lobos, and Dwight Yoakam. And for years, the Crest hosted the Artists Fashion Show when Sacramento's most outrageous artists put together a fashion show of handmade costumes built on an individual theme for each show. All ticket sales went towards fighting AIDS. The Artists' Fashion Show was also sponsored by On the Wing magazine which was a local arts paper showcasing what was going on in Midtown.

== See also ==
- Alhambra Theatre (Sacramento)
- Tower Theatre
