= Flaming Youth (song) =

Single by Kiss

from the album Destroyer
- Released: April 30, 1976 (US)
- Recorded: Record Plant Studios, New York City: 1976
- Genre: Hard rock
- Length: 2:55 (album version); 2:39 (single version)
- Label: Casablanca NB-858-A (US)
- Songwriters: Ace Frehley, Paul Stanley, Gene Simmons, Bob Ezrin
- Producer: Bob Ezrin

Kiss singles chronology
"Shout It Out Loud" / "Sweet Pain" (1976)	"Flaming Youth" / "God of Thunder" (1976)	"Detroit Rock City" / "Beth" (1976)

Alternative cover
- The "Flaming Youth" single was the final single to appear on the "Bogart" label.

"Flaming Youth" is a song by the American rock band Kiss. The song is featured on their 1976 album Destroyer, and was the first Kiss single to feature a picture sleeve. The single reached number 74 in the U.S. and 73 in Canada. Although the full album version only ran 2:55 (2:59 on CD remasters), the song was still edited to 2:39 with an earlier fade.

== Overview ==
The song was written by Ace Frehley, Paul Stanley, Gene Simmons and Bob Ezrin. Ezrin took pieces of music written by the other three and organized them into one song. For example, one of the main riffs on "Flaming Youth" was from a song that Simmons wrote called "Mad Dog", which appeared on Kiss' 2001 release, The Box Set.

The song's instrumentation features a calliope, the use of which was inspired by producer Bob Ezrin.

Cash Box said that "the instruments really scream, particularly the guitars" and that "there's a lot of energy here." Record World called it "a raving anthem about growing up" and "a great follow to 'Shout It Out Loud.'".

In the United States, this was the first Kiss 45 rpm 7-inch single to be produced with the tan "Casbah" label. However, it can be found from Canada and Japan with the dark blue "smoking man" label.

KISS - The Casablanca Singles 1974-1982 box set included the "Flaming Youth" 45 rpm 7-inch single from the United States, however, it was pressed onto the dark blue "smoking man" label. The re-recorded/remastered version of the song from Destroyer- Resurrected (2012) was also used in the making of the record instead of the original 1976 version.

== Personnel ==
- Paul Stanley – lead vocals/rhythm guitar
- Ace Frehley – lead guitar, guitar solo
- Gene Simmons – bass guitar/backing vocals
- Peter Criss – drums
- Dick Wagner – guitar licks (at the end)
- Bob Ezrin – calliope

== Charts ==
Chart (1976)	Peak position
Canada Top Singles (RPM)	73
Finnish Singles (The Official Finnish Charts)	30
US Billboard Hot 100	74
