= Beth (song) =

Single by Kiss

from the album Destroyer
- B-side: "Detroit Rock City"
- Released: August 1976
- Recorded: 1976
- Studio: Record Plant (New York City)
- Genre: Soft rock
- Length: 2:49
- Label: Casablanca
- Songwriters: Peter Criss; Stan Penridge; Bob Ezrin
- Producer: Bob Ezrin

Kiss singles chronology
"Flaming Youth" (1976)	"Beth" (1976)	"Hard Luck Woman" (1976)

"Beth" is a ballad by American rock band Kiss, originally released on their fourth studio album Destroyer (1976). The song was composed by producer Bob Ezrin, who reworked a demo called "Beck", which was written by drummer Peter Criss and his friend Stan Penridge.

Released as an A-side single by Casablanca Records in August 1976, due to its growing popularity after having been released the previous month as the B-side to "Detroit Rock City", "Beth" is Kiss's biggest commercial hit in the United States, reaching No. 7 on the Billboard Hot 100. The song received a gold record certification from the RIAA, and won the 1977 People's Choice Award for "Favorite Song".

The demo, "Beck", was written by Criss and Penridge during their time with the band Chelsea and later recorded as a demo when the pair were in a band called Lips. During the recording of Destroyer, Criss showed it to Ezrin, who made several changes to it and recommended changing its title to "Beth". Due to its positive commercial reception, the song appeared in many of Kiss' concerts, where Criss usually sang it over an instrumental track. "Beth" has appeared on most Kiss compilations and live albums, including Kiss Unplugged (1996), where the band performed it acoustically.

== Background ==
During drummer Peter Criss's time in the band Chelsea, he and the group's guitarist Stan Penridge decided to write a song that mocked a woman named Becky, the wife of their bandmate Mike Brand. According to Criss, she regularly called the group during rehearsals to ask when her husband would come home, and this gave them the idea of composing the first verse of the song: "Beck, I hear you callin', but I can't come home right now. Me and the boys are playin', and we just can't find the sound". Criss has also said over the years that he composed the song for his first wife, Lydia.

By 1975, Kiss had released three studio albums, in which Criss's compositional contributions were minimal; the only track on which he appeared credited was the instrumental track "Love Theme from Kiss", written by the four members of the band and included on their self-titled debut. Criss assumed the role of vocalist in other songs created by his bandmates; however, for Destroyer, Criss set himself the goal of adding one of his own compositions. During a limousine ride, Criss sang an uptempo version of "Beck" for Simmons and Stanley, assuming they would not be interested in including a sentimental ballad on the album. Simmons and Stanley suggested that he sing it to producer Bob Ezrin, who agreed to record it and assured him that it would be a success. Ezrin's decision was motivated by the fact that the band's other songs were primarily about sex, and he believed that "Beck" was a love song that "everyone would relate to".

== Composition and recording ==
Ezrin made several arrangements of the song's melody and wrote part of the lyrics. Gene Simmons suggested changing the name to "Beth" because it would be easier to sing and to avoid confusion with Jeff Beck. However, Lydia Criss later claimed credit for proposing the change for the same reason, and because the original Becky had a twin sister named Beth. Guitarist Ace Frehley attributed the modification to Ezrin, allegedly to make the name less androgynous.

As explained by Criss: "I wrote the melody and creating the phrasing for the song that's on the original demo "Beck" with Stan Penridge. Out of Stan's little black book what remained on the reworked version of "Beth" is Stan's original verse and chorus, and my core melody remains on the reworked composition. The core melody was expanded with Bob's orchestration symphony and musical genius. Bob and I sat at the piano at the Record Plant studio working out the song. Bob Ezrin changed the tempo and made it slower, and I worked on changing some of the second verse and the phrasing with the slower tempo". In his autobiography, Simmons recounted that "I have never seen [Criss] compose a single song. Peter might have contributed a line or two of the lyrics, but after listening to Penridge's original demo, it's clear who made the original song". In a 2014 interview for Rolling Stone, Paul Stanley agreed with Simmons's assessment that Penridge was the main writer, and he commented that Criss had nothing to do with the composition of "Beth", adding that "if you write one hit, you should be able to write two". Criss, in his defense, asserted that Stanley was jealous because "he is the main vocalist of a group in which he did not write the greatest success. That's his problem. They hate the fact that I was the songwriter of a hit and won the People's Choice". In a 2026 interview, Peter Criss described the songwriting process of "Beth" in a more detailed way, revealing that he composed the core melody of the song and addressing the changes that Ezrin made.

For the song's recording, Ezrin brought the New York Philharmonic orchestra and musician Dick Wagner into the A&R studio as a substitute for Frehley, making Beth a dramatic departure from the band's typical hard rock sound. According to Criss and Simmons, Frehley did not participate in the recording because he was engaged in playing cards with friends. Once the orchestra arrived at the studio, Ezrin suggested that all 25 members wear fake tuxedos and that Criss appear in the studio in his trademark makeup so he could take some pictures. For his part, Ezrin put on a top hat and played the grand piano. Finally, Criss recorded the vocals at the Record Plant studio.

Structurally, "Beth" lacks a solo; instead, the mid-octave section repeats the intro along with the chorus in an orchestral interlude. The sound of the violin and viola, led by the cello, change the key from C major to A minor and then the trumpets, tubas, trombones and French horns enter, accentuating the hook. During recording, Criss was by himself in the studio, making "Beth" the only Kiss song to contain no instrumentals from any member of the band.

== Release ==
Casablanca Records released "Beth" in August 1976 as Destroyer's fourth single. The album, released on March 4, peaked at #11 on the Billboard 200, but quickly began to decline. Its first two singles, "Shout It Out Loud" and "Flaming Youth", failed to match "Rock and Roll All Nite" - at that time the group's most successful song in the United States - and Casablanca Records executives had to choose another song from the album to release as a single. Casablanca president Neil Bogart asked promoter and disc jockey Scott Shannon for his honest opinion on which of Destroyer's tracks was a potential hit. To his surprise, Shannon chose "Beth", although Bogart asked him to forget it because he felt the song had only been included as a favor to Peter Criss. In the face of Bogart's refusal, Shannon contacted vice president Larry Harris, who revealed that Bogart disliked "Beth" because it was his ex-wife's name and he felt the lyrics reflected the process of their divorce.

Before the release of the third single, Bogart took a vacation in Acapulco, but not before giving the order to release "Beth" as the B-side of the next single, in order to reduce its chances of commercial success. During Bogart's absence, "Detroit Rock City" was released as a single, accompanied by "Beth", and was sent out to radio stations. To the bewilderment of the Casablanca executives, the jockeys chose to broadcast "Beth". The song soon became one of the most requested by listeners, and Harris made the decision to reissue the single with "Beth" as side A. One significant contributor to "Beth"'s popularity was Rosalie Trombley, at the time the music director at "The Big 8" CKLW in Windsor, Ontario, immediately across the Detroit River from Detroit, Michigan. Trombley's daughter had a copy of "Detroit Rock City", but was hooked on "Beth" and convinced Trombley to add it to CKLW's playlist. After "Beth" became a hit, Kiss presented Trombley's daughter with a gold record. Upon Bogart's return, he was forced to accept the situation due to the song's positive commercial reception. "Beth" reached #7 on the US chart, the best in Kiss' career, and achieved a gold record certification from the RIAA on January 5, 1977. The impact of the song boosted Destroyer's sales and enabled the album to go platinum. "Beth" received the award for Favorite Song at the 1977 People's Choice Awards.

== Reception ==
According to Kiss manager Bill Aucoin, "'Beth' was so much of a departure that the fans didn't quite know what to make of it. They were shocked". Critic Allan Orski wrote in the book Musichound Rock: The Essential Album Guide that the song "set the mark for myriad (lesser) power ballads spewed by various hair bands during the 80s". One reason of its success, according to Jason Josephes of Pitchfork, was that it was a song "that the girls dug (therefore the guys could dig it)". Regarding the lyrics, Shawn S. Lealos of AXS noted that it is a "perfect example" of how "the life of a rock and roll musician is not one for people who want to settle into a serious relationship".

Eduardo Rivadavia of Ultimate Classic Rock highlighted Aucoin's importance to the track's inclusion on Destroyer, describing it as "uncharacteristic and exceedingly schmaltzy" and arguing that "perhaps its greatest utility, though, was helping many among the band’s predominantly male fanbase convince their old ladies to tag along to the show". Classic Rock called it a "twinkling piano ballad" that provided "a useful breather amid the blood and thunder of Kiss’s live shows". Regarding its unusual impact, Ed Masley of The Arizona Republic remarked that "It's kind of weird that Kiss' highest-charting hit was sung by drummer Criss. And weirder still that it's an orchestrated ballad expressing a shockingly empathetic view of women and what they're made to go through when they're dealing with the likes of Kiss".

== Live and media performances ==
Following the commercial success of Destroyer, Kiss included "Beth" in their concert repertoire due to popular demand. According to Criss, his bandmates did not want to perform it live, but Aucoin insisted that some new fans would be coming to their concerts because of the song. The rehearsals to play "Beth" live were described by Criss as a "nightmare" as none of the other band members played on the original track and Frehley could not play acoustic guitar. However, Aucoin and his partner Sean Delaney proposed using a pre-recorded instrumental track and having Criss sit on a drum case to sing it.

The song's television debut was on The Paul Lynde Halloween Special on October 29, 1976, where Criss lip-synced a shortened version of the song while miming on piano. The song appears in Kiss Meets the Phantom of the Park (1978) in a scene in which Stanley plays acoustic guitar while Criss sings.

The acoustic version featured on Kiss Unplugged is the only recording with members of Kiss solely backing up Criss. The version of "Beth" featured on the group's 2003 Kiss Symphony: Alive IV DVD and subsequent album would be the only time the song was performed live with an ensemble. In 2010, the song was performed live for the first time with Eric Singer on acoustic guitar during their Sonic Boom Over Europe Tour and again on their The Hottest Show on Earth Tour in 2011. Later, it was again removed from setlists, but the band occasionally performed the song at meet and greet sessions. On the 2019 End of the Road World Tour, the song was performed by Singer, miming it on the piano.

Kiss' final show at Madison Square Garden in 2023 was broadcast live via pay-per-view. Although Singer's performance of "Beth" was shown on the live broadcast, a message was shown on replays notifying viewers that the performance could not be made available due to "copyright requirements". Some fans speculated that Criss himself denied the band permission to rebroadcast the song due to old animosity towards Stanley and Simmons.

== Personnel ==
- Peter Criss: lead vocals
- Bob Ezrin: piano and production
- Dick Wagner: acoustic guitar
- New York Philharmonic: orchestra

== Other versions ==
Eric Carr, who replaced Criss as the band's drummer in 1980, never performed the song live during his stay, although he provided vocals to a studio version for the Smashes, Thrashes & Hits (1988) compilation album. Criss recorded an acoustic version of "Beth" for his limited edition EP Criss (1993). Criss described the recording as "a way to say to the fans, 'I'm back and I love you and only you the KISS fans can get this'". The same version appeared on his studio album Cat 1 (1994).

In 2012, a version of "Beth" was included in Destroyer: Resurrected, a remixed version of Destroyer. Criss derided the release in an interview with Eddie Trunk, remarking, "Why touch a masterpiece?".

== Charts ==
=== Weekly charts ===
Chart (1976–1977)	Peak position
Australian Singles (Kent Music Report)	79
Canada Top Singles (RPM)	5
Canada Adult Contemporary (RPM)	20
US Billboard Hot 100	7
US Hot Adult Contemporary Tracks	14
US Cash Box Top 100	7

=== Year-end charts ===
Chart (1976)	Position
Canada Top Singles (RPM)	69
US Cash Box	92
US Opus	96

Chart (1977)	Position
US American Top 40	41

== Certifications ==
Region	Certification	Certified units/sales
Canada (Music Canada)	Gold	75,000^{^}
United States (RIAA)	Gold	1,000,000^{^}
^{^} Shipments figures based on certification alone.

== Bibliography ==
- Campion, James (2015). Shout It Out Loud: The Story of Kiss's Destroyer and the Making of an American Icon. Hal Leonard Corporation. ISBN 978-1-617-13644-3.
- Criss, Peter (2012). Makeup to Breakup: My Life In and Out of Kiss. Simon and Schuster. ISBN 978-1-45-162084-9.
- Gill, Julian (2006). The Kiss Album Focus,: Roar of Grease Paint, 1997-2006: Volume 3. Kissfaq. ISBN 978-0-972-22535-9.
- Leaf, David; Sharp, Ken (2008). KISS: Behind the Mask - Official Authorized Biography. Hachette UK. ISBN 978-0-44-655350-6.
- Simmons, Gene (2010). Kiss And Make-Up. Random House. ISBN 978-1-40-706017-0.
- Stanley, Paul (2014). Face the Music: A Life Exposed. HarperCollins. ISBN 978-0-06-211404-4.
- Weiss, Brett (2016). Encyclopedia of KISS: Music, Personnel, Events and Related Subjects. McFarland. ISBN 978-1-47-662540-9.
