= NEHST Studios =

NEHST Studios is a film, television, and internet financing, development and production company announced at the Cannes Film Festival in 2007. It was founded by Larry Meistrich, producer of the Oscar-winning Sling Blade, among many others, and a team of industry execs. NEHST is pronounced "next" and is the spelling of the Old English word for next.

NEHST Studios releases include the documentary 41 about The Station nightclub fire, which killed 100 people in West Warwick, Rhode Island in 2003. In 2009, the studio announced the acquisition of feature rights to the sports books of Matt Christopher.

It was reported in 2010 that NEHST was asking actors to pay to be cast in its movies, and might be investigated for the practice by the Screen Actors Guild.
