= End of the Road World Tour =

2019–23 concert tour by Kiss

- Tour by Kiss
- Promotional poster for the tour
- Location: Asia; Europe; North America; Oceania; South America
- Start date: January 31, 2019
- End date: December 2, 2023
- Legs: 13
- No. of shows: 250

Kiss concert chronology
- Kissworld Tour (2017–18); End of the Road World Tour (2019–23)

The End of the Road World Tour was the final concert tour by the American rock band Kiss. The tour began on January 31, 2019, at Rogers Arena in Vancouver, Canada and concluded on December 2, 2023 at Madison Square Garden in New York City, United States. This was the final concert tour to feature the final band lineup with founding members Paul Stanley, Gene Simmons, as well as Tommy Thayer on lead guitar and Eric Singer on drums.

== Background ==
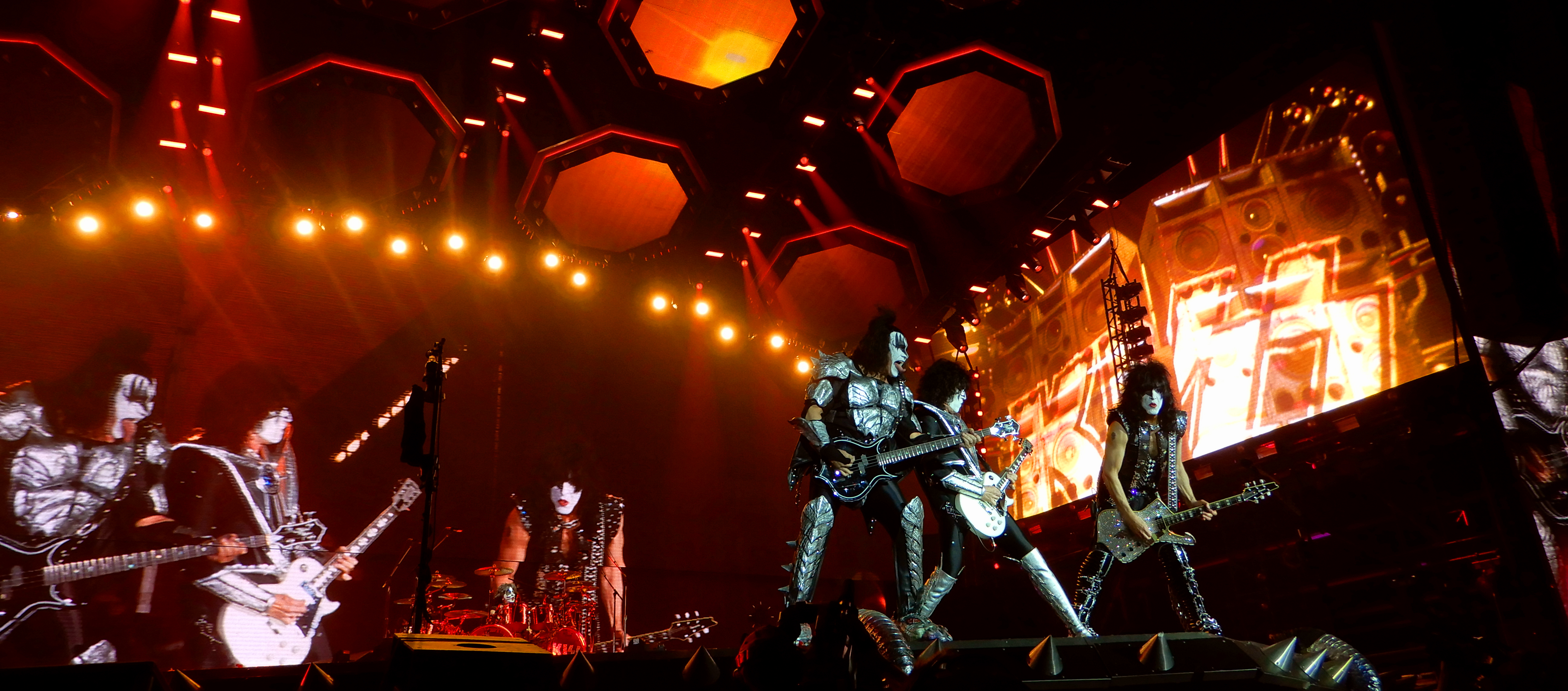
Kiss performing at Hellfest 2019

The tour was announced on September 19, 2018, following a performance of "Detroit Rock City" on America's Got Talent. Tour dates were officially announced for North America, Europe and Oceania on October 30, 2018. Professional painter David Garibaldi served as Kiss's opening act for the 2019 North American and European legs of the tour. David Lee Roth was later announced as the opening act for the 2020 North American leg. Due to the COVID-19 pandemic, most of the shows that were to take place in 2020 were postponed into 2021.

The band later announced on November 20, 2020 that they would perform an exclusive New Year's Eve 2020 livestream show. The Kiss New Year's Eve 2020 Goodbye livestream concert was produced by City Drive Studios and directed by Daniel Catullo. The pay-per-view concert was part of the Landmarks Live Series and was filmed with over fifty 4K cameras with 360-degree views on a 250-foot stage at The Royal Beach at Atlantis The Palm, Dubai. The performance broke two Guinness World Records: one for the highest flame projection in a music concert and another for the most flame projections launched simultaneously in a music concert. On June 11, 2021, following the premiere of the band's documentary Biography: Kisstory at the Tribeca Film Festival, the band performed a five-song set at Battery Park in New York City.

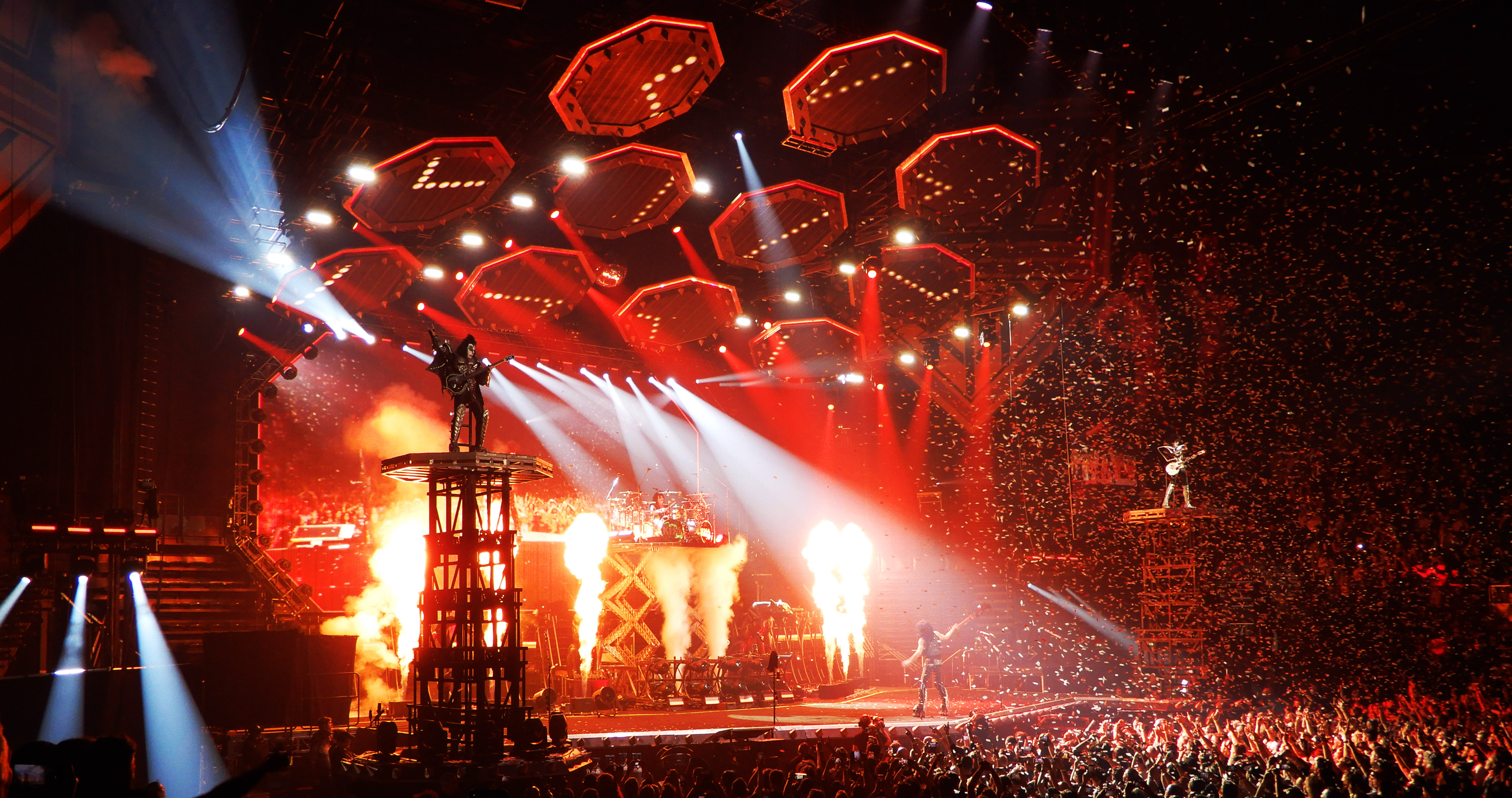
Kiss performing in Paris on June 7, 2022.

In an October 2021 interview, Stanley stated that Kiss' final concert together was estimated to take place in early 2023: "I believe strongly by the beginning of 2023 we will be finished, it seems only natural for the final show to be in New York. That is where the band started, and that was really the background for the band getting together and writing these songs and played loft parties and played clubs starting with an audience of probably 10 people. It seems we should go full circle." The band performed on board the 2022 edition of the Kiss Kruise in October to November 2022, which was their final time they would perform on the cruise.

In addition to adding another 100 cities on tour into 2023, Simmons stated that he would continue working with the American rock-inspired restaurant Rock & Brews, and performing with his solo band when the final tour had concluded. He later stated that the band was retiring out of self-respect and love for the fans and that he would be very emotional during the band's final performance which he presumed would take place around 2024, although the band's manager Doc McGhee insisted the band's final show would "definitely" take place in 2023. The band later confirmed the final leg of the tour on the Howard Stern Show on March 1, 2023, with the final show taking place in New York City on December 1 and 2, 2023, in which the second and final performance was streamed on Pay-per-view.

In preparation for the final performances in New York City, a number of various events in honor of the shows took place across a five day period, which included a lighting ceremony on the Empire State Building in honor of both the band's final two shows and its 50-year history, with colors of silver that represented the band logo, and the colors of red, purple, green and blue to honor the band characters. At the end of the final show in New York City, the band announced a "new era" for Kiss, in which they would live on as digital avatars for fully virtual stage show performances, which was created by Industrial Light and Magic and Pophouse, who had previously created ABBA's similar ABBAtar digital presentation.

In the tour program for the final tour, both Stanley and Simmons commented on the tour:

Kiss is much more than a rock and roll band. The band and its fans are a tribe. It's humbling for me that we can be the magnet that brings people together. What we have with the fans is reciprocity. The fans are our oxygen, they are our blood. They make it possible for us to exist. This tour is a celebration of 40 years of that connection between Kiss and the fans.
– Paul Stanley

Kiss has always marched to the beat of their own drum. It's amazing how a band like Kiss that started off innocently enough as just four guys off the streets of New York who wanted to put together the band they never saw onstage turned into a worldwide phenomenon. The fact that it actually worked beyond anyone's wildest dreams is amazing.
– Gene Simmons

== Reception ==
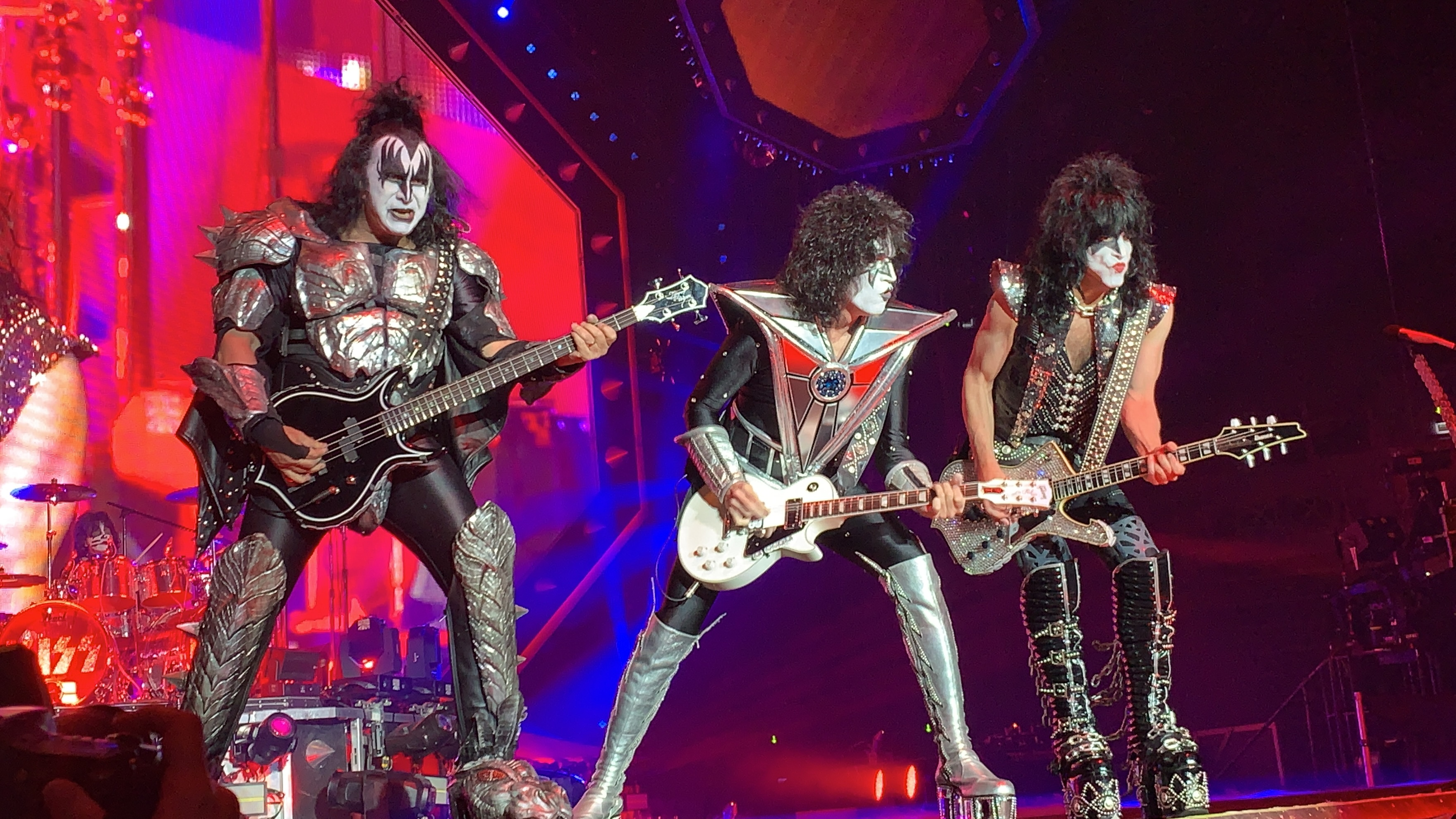
Kiss performing in Kraków on June 18, 2019

Vancouver Sun's Stuart Derdeyn, who had attended the tour's opening night in Vancouver, Canada, gave the show a positive review, stating: "After being treated to an opening trio of tunes that included "Detroit Rock City", "Shout It Out Loud" and "Deuce" embellish with as much pyrotechnics as other bands might use for an entire show, the crowd at the opening night of the Kiss 'End of the Road' world tour was right in the sweet spot that the New York City quartet has always been able to get them into."

Chris Jordan from the Asbury Park Press who had attended the Madison Square Garden performance on March 27, 2019, gave the concert a positive review. He noted the large amount of energy that the band had, as well as praising the amount of explosions, fire breathing and elevated risers. The reporter closed the review, stating: "By the time the band got to 'Rock and Roll All Nite', with a burst of confetti to close the show, it was apparent. You were rocked."

Nikki O'Neill from the Chicago Tribune who had attended the performance in Chicago, stated: "Saturday's show was delivered by a musically tight and drama-free band. Original member Paul Stanley especially seemed to have fun on stage, often letting a smile crack through his "Starchild" makeup, addressing the crowd in his unmistakable stage voice, which best can be described as a mix of Southern rock 'n' roll preacher and fired up drag queen. Although the show is super-scripted - because of the ample pyrotechnics, the band would argue - there's not a moment of dullness or dead air as Kiss gave the audience a live summary of its career, with 20 songs representing the classic '70s era and the makeup-free '80s, performing only one song from the '90s and one from 2009 with the current lineup."

=== Backing track accusations ===
During the first leg of the tour, the band, and particularly Stanley, were initially accused by fans of lip syncing and using backing tracks during their performances. In response to the accusations, Stanley did not confirm nor deny that he lip syncs on stage, saying he is taking care of his voice. Accusations were revived following the band's Belgium performance when a slip-up with the fireworks and drum cues occurred at the end of the opening song, "Detroit Rock City". McGhee later confirmed that Stanley did sing fully. He denied that Stanley was lip syncing, but stated that he will sing to tracks.

== Opening acts ==
- David Garibaldi (North America 2019, Europe 2019, North America 2021)
- The New Roses (May 27 in Leipzig, 29 in Vienna and 31 in Munich, Europe 2019, June 1 in Dortmund and June 24 in Frankfurt, Europe 2022)
- David Lee Roth (North America 2020)
- Frank's White Canvas (April 19 in Santiago, Latin America 2022)
- Catoni (April 20 in Santiago, Latin America 2022)
- Arde La Sangre (April 23 in Buenos Aires, Latin America 2022)
- The Last Internationale (June 7, July 21, Europe 2022)
- Shiraz Lane (June 20 in Helsinki, Europe 2022)
- Mammoth WVH (July 5 in Nîmes, Europe 2022)
- Wolfmother (Australia 2022)
- Tumbleweed (Australia 2022)
- Mulga Bore Hard Rock (Australia 2022)
- Sepultura (April 20 in Belo Horizonte, Latin America 2023)
- Skindred (United Kingdom 2023)
- The Wild Things (United Kingdom 2023)
- In Extremo (Europe 2023)
- Skid Row (Europe 2023)
- The Darkness (July 15 in Tønsberg, Europe 2023)
- Eagles of Death Metal (July 15 in Tønsberg, Europe 2023)
- Fangst (July 15 in Tønsberg, Europe 2023)
- Weezer (Australia 2023)
- Regurgitator (Australia 2023)
- The Delta Riggs (Australia 2023)
- Dirty Honey (July 9 in Zagreb, and July 14 in Budapest, Europe 2023)
- Crown Lands (Canada 2023)
- Amber Wild (United States)

== Set list ==
This set list is representative of the show in Vancouver on January 31, 2019. It does not represent all of the concerts for the duration of the tour.

1. "Detroit Rock City"
2. "Shout It Out Loud"
3. "Deuce"
4. "Say Yeah"
5. "Heaven's on Fire"
6. "War Machine" (Gene breathes fire)
7. "Lick It Up" (with "Won't Get Fooled Again" by The Who snippet)
8. "100,000 Years" (with drum solo)
9. "God of Thunder" (with bass solo; Gene spits blood)
10. "Cold Gin" (with guitar solo)
11. "Psycho Circus"
12. "I Love It Loud"
13. "Hide Your Heart"
14. "Let Me Go, Rock 'n' Roll"
15. "Love Gun" (Paul flies to stage in crowd)
16. "I Was Made for Lovin' You"
17. "Black Diamond"
  Encore
18. "Beth" (Eric Singer on piano)
19. "Do You Love Me"
20. "Rock and Roll All Nite"

== Tour dates ==
List of 2019 concerts
Date	City	Country	Venue	Attendance	Revenue
January 31, 2019	Vancouver	Canada	Rogers Arena	13,373 / 13,373 (100%)	$1,551,414
February 1, 2019	Portland	United States	Moda Center	12,821 / 13,543 (94%)	$1,442,984
February 2, 2019	Tacoma	United States	Tacoma Dome	14,191 / 14,659 (96%)	$1,464,975
February 4, 2019	Spokane	United States	Spokane Arena	7,241 / 7,241 (100%)	$634,166
February 7, 2019	San Diego	United States	Viejas Arena	7,521 / 7,825 (96%)	$876,677
February 8, 2019	Fresno	United States	Save Mart Center	9,847 / 10,802 (91%)	$1,014,452
February 9, 2019	Sacramento	United States	Golden 1 Center	12,479 / 12,479 (100%)	$1,444,937
February 12, 2019	Anaheim	United States	Honda Center	10,364 / 13,632 (76%)	$1,210,215
February 13, 2019	Glendale	United States	Gila River Arena	9,068 / 15,000 (60%)	$1,223,363
February 15, 2019	Las Vegas	United States	T-Mobile Arena	13,854 / 14,468 (95%)	$1,442,534
February 16, 2019	Inglewood	United States	The Forum	13,660 / 13,660 (100%)	$1,769,872
February 19, 2019	Corpus Christi	United States	American Bank Center Arena	7,810 / 8,170 (95%)	$1,053,036
February 20, 2019	Dallas	United States	American Airlines Center	12,033 / 12,737 (94%)	$1,611,304
February 22, 2019	New Orleans	United States	Smoothie King Center	10,677 / 10,677 (100%)	$1,328,420
February 23, 2019	Memphis	United States	FedExForum	12,047 / 12,950 (93%)	$1,404,952
February 26, 2019	Oklahoma City	United States	Chesapeake Energy Arena	11,501 / 11,501 (100%)	$1,322,069
February 27, 2019	Kansas City	United States	Sprint Center	10,842 / 12,256 (88%)	$1,152,061
March 1, 2019	Milwaukee	United States	Fiserv Forum	9,663 / 9,663 (100%)	$1,185,069
March 2, 2019	Chicago	United States	United Center	13,917 / 13,917 (100%)	$1,769,254
March 4, 2019	Minneapolis	United States	Target Center	11,020 / 11,321 (97%)	$1,405,117
March 6, 2019	Sioux Falls	United States	Denny Sanford Premier Center	9,284 / 10,458 (89%)	$948,546
March 7, 2019	Omaha	United States	CHI Health Center Omaha	12,730 / 12,730 (100%)	$1,101,669
March 9, 2019	Grand Rapids	United States	Van Andel Arena	10,553 / 10,553 (100%)	$1,257,123
March 10, 2019	Moline	United States	TaxSlayer Center	9,599 / 9,599 (100%)	$1,038,855
March 12, 2019	Louisville	United States	KFC Yum! Center	14,638 / 14,638 (100%)	$1,444,057
March 13, 2019	Detroit	United States	Little Caesars Arena	13,159 / 13,791 (95%)	$1,558,645
March 16, 2019	Columbus	United States	Nationwide Arena	14,241 / 14,241 (100%)	$1,848,999
March 17, 2019	Cleveland	United States	Quicken Loans Arena	12,307 / 12,307 (100%)	$1,404,793
March 19, 2019	Montreal	Canada	Bell Centre	14,207 / 14,756 (96%)	$1,214,421
March 20, 2019	Toronto	Canada	Scotiabank Arena	14,078 / 14,078 (100%)	$1,170,196
March 22, 2019	Uniondale	United States	Nassau Veterans Memorial Coliseum	10,368 / 10,368 (100%)	$1,432,295
March 23, 2019	Uncasville	United States	Mohegan Sun Arena	7,254 / 7,254 (100%)	$969,342
March 26, 2019	Boston	United States	TD Garden	16,843 / 16,843 (100%)	$1,569,234
March 27, 2019	New York City	United States	Madison Square Garden	13,359 / 13,359 (100%)	$1,730,755
March 29, 2019	Philadelphia	United States	Wells Fargo Center	14,530 / 14,530 (100%)	$1,586,959
March 30, 2019	Pittsburgh	United States	PPG Paints Arena	13,486 / 13,486 (100%)	$1,560,111
April 2, 2019	Quebec City	Canada	Videotron Centre	13,142 / 13,142 (100%)	$1,074,865
April 3, 2019	Ottawa	Canada	Canadian Tire Centre	11,315 / 11,315 (100%)	$1,050,517
April 6, 2019	Raleigh	United States	PNC Arena	13,076 / 13,076 (100%)	$1,756,574
April 7, 2019	Atlanta	United States	State Farm Arena	6,945 / 6,945 (100%)	$1,324,454
April 9, 2019	Nashville	United States	Bridgestone Arena	13,759 / 13,759 (100%)	$1,590,796
April 11, 2019	Tampa	United States	Amalie Arena	13,509 / 13,509 (100%)	$1,654,566
April 12, 2019	Jacksonville	United States	VyStar Veterans Memorial Arena	11,225 / 11,225 (100%)	$1,277,895
April 13, 2019	Birmingham	United States	Legacy Arena	12,788 / 12,788 (100%)	$1,560,015
May 3, 2019 (Note: The concert on May 3, 2019 was a part of Domination Festival.)	Mexico City	Mexico	Autódromo Hermanos Rodríguez	—N/a	—N/a
May 27, 2019	Leipzig	Germany	Arena Leipzig	~10,000 / 12,000	—
May 29, 2019	Vienna	Austria	Wiener Stadthalle	~15,000 / 16,152	—
May 31, 2019	Munich	Germany	Königsplatz	—	—
June 2, 2019	Essen	Germany	Stadion Essen	~20,000	—
June 4, 2019	Berlin	Germany	Waldbühne	14,673 / 22,290 (66%)	$1,393,935
June 5, 2019	Hanover	Germany	Expo-Plaza	~14,000 / 14,000	—
June 7, 2019 (Note: The concert on June 7, 2019 was a part of Sweden Rock Festival.)	Sölvesborg	Sweden	Norje Havsbad	—N/a	—N/a
June 9, 2019 (Note: The concert on June 9, 2019 was a part of Rockfest.)	Hyvinkää	Finland	Hyvinkää Airfield	—N/a	—N/a
June 11, 2019	Saint Petersburg	Russia	Ice Palace	—	—
June 13, 2019	Moscow	Russia	VTB Arena	—	—
June 16, 2019	Kyiv	Ukraine	NSC Olimpiyskiy	—	—
June 18, 2019	Kraków	Poland	Tauron Arena Kraków	—	—
June 19, 2019 (Note: The concert on June 19, 2019 was a part of Prague Rocks.)	Prague	Czech Republic	Sinobo Stadium	—N/a	—N/a
June 22, 2019 (Note: The concert on June 22, 2019 was a part of Hellfest.)	Clisson	France	Val de Moine	—N/a	—N/a
June 23, 2019 (Note: The concert on June 23, 2019 was a part of Graspop Metal Meeting.)	Dessel	Belgium	Boeretang	—N/a	—N/a
June 25, 2019	Amsterdam	Netherlands	Ziggo Dome	15,182 / 15,182 (100%)	$1,211,657
June 27, 2019 (Note: The concert on June 27, 2019 was a part of Tons of Rock.)	Oslo	Norway	Ekebergsletta	—N/a	—N/a
June 28, 2019 (Note: The concert on June 28, 2019 was a part of Trondheim Rocks.)	Trondheim	Norway	Dahls Arena	—N/a	—N/a
July 2, 2019	Milan	Italy	Ippodromo SNAI San Siro	11,005 / 12,400 (89%)	$1,034,121
July 4, 2019	Zürich	Switzerland	Hallenstadion	13,000 / 13,000 (100%)	$1,661,865
July 6, 2019	Iffezheim	Germany	Rennbahn^{1}	~14,000	—
July 9, 2019	Birmingham	England	Arena Birmingham	10,719 / 13,084 (82%)	—
July 11, 2019	London	England	The O_{2} Arena	15,295 / 17,586 (87%)	$1,182,490
July 12, 2019	Manchester	England	Manchester Arena	13,445 / 13,533 (99%)	$1,037,010
July 14, 2019	Newcastle	England	Utilita Arena Newcastle	—	—
July 16, 2019	Glasgow	Scotland	SSE Hydro	9,879 / 10,914 (91%)	$826,799
August 6, 2019	Sunrise	United States	BB&T Center	9,490 / 9,490 (100%)	$1,122,221
August 8, 2019	North Charleston	United States	North Charleston Coliseum	6,568 / 8,358 (79%)	$896,223
August 10, 2019	Charlotte	United States	PNC Music Pavilion	16,284 / 16,284 (100%)	$1,190,369
August 11, 2019	Bristow	United States	Jiffy Lube Live	12,697 / 12,697 (100%)	$1,047,325
August 13, 2019	Virginia Beach	United States	Veterans United Home Loans Amphitheater	11,089 / 11,089 (100%)	$739,048
August 14, 2019	Newark	United States	Prudential Center	11,135 / 11,135 (100%)	$1,195,968
August 16, 2019	Montreal	Canada	Bell Centre	11,343 / 13,882 (82%)	$1,036,380
August 17, 2019	Toronto	Canada	Scotiabank Arena	13,125 / 13,125 (100%)	$1,110,403
August 20, 2019	Brooklyn	United States	Barclays Center	11,566 / 11,566 (100%)	$1,035,019
August 21, 2019	Hershey	United States	Hersheypark Stadium	16,413 / 16,413 (100%)	$1,326,697
August 23, 2019	Darien	United States	Darien Lake Performing Arts Center	10,515 / 10,515 (100%)	$681,608
August 24, 2019	Saratoga Springs	United States	Saratoga Performing Arts Center^{2}	11,604 / 11,604 (100%)	$811,722
August 27, 2019	Syracuse	United States	St. Joseph's Amphitheater at Lakeview	9,354 / 9,354 (100%)	$598,262
August 29, 2019	Cincinnati	United States	Riverbend Music Center	12,263 / 12,263 (100%)	$1,044,762
August 31, 2019	Noblesville	United States	Ruoff Home Mortgage Music Center	20,898 / 20,898 (100%)	$1,311,685
September 1, 2019	Maryland Heights	United States	Hollywood Casino Amphitheatre	16,695 / 16,695 (100%)	$1,128,625
September 3, 2019	Des Moines	United States	Wells Fargo Arena	8,049 / 12,799 (63%)	$804,921
September 5, 2019	Little Rock	United States	Verizon Arena^{3}	9,483 / 9,483 (100%)	$768,520
September 7, 2019	Bossier City	United States	CenturyLink Center	8,041 / 8,041 (100%)	$872,477
September 8, 2019	San Antonio	United States	AT&T Center	12,277 / 12,277 (100%)	$1,527,656
September 9, 2019	Houston	United States	Toyota Center	7,304 / 7,304 (100%)	$967,154
September 11, 2019	Albuquerque	United States	Isleta Amphitheater	12,115 / 12,115 (100%)	$786,357
September 12, 2019	Denver	United States	Pepsi Center	11,138 / 11,138 (100%)	$1,460,307
December 8, 2019	Sendai	Japan	Xebio Arena Sendai	4,000 / 4,000 (100%)	$714,181
December 11, 2019	Tokyo	Japan	Tokyo Dome^{4}	32,975 / 40,000 (83%)	$6,111,730
December 14, 2019	Morioka	Japan	Morioka Takaya Arena	2,942 / 2,942 (100%)	$525,280
December 17, 2019	Osaka	Japan	Kyocera Dome Osaka^{5}	14,480 / 25,000 (58%)	$2,702,970
December 19, 2019	Nagoya	Japan	Dolphins Arena	5,058 / 5,058 (100%)	$903,083

List of 2020 concerts
Date	City	Country	Venue	Attendance	Revenue
February 1, 2020	Manchester	United States	SNHU Arena	6,712 / 6,712 (100%)	$791,430
February 4, 2020	Allentown	United States	PPL Center	6,674 / 6,674 (100%)	$712,645
February 5, 2020	Buffalo	United States	KeyBank Center	6,026 / 6,026 (100%)	$560,281
February 7, 2020	Charlottesville	United States	John Paul Jones Arena	6,103 / 6,103 (100%)	$621,597
February 8, 2020	Greensboro	United States	Greensboro Coliseum	9,230 / 9,230 (100%)	$895,713
February 11, 2020	Columbia	United States	Colonial Life Arena	7,278 / 7,278 (100%)	$732,869
February 13, 2020	Lexington	United States	Rupp Arena at Central Bank Center	7,256 / 7,256 (100%)	$815,555
February 15, 2020	Peoria	United States	Peoria Civic Center	7,414 / 7,414 (100%)	$883,227
February 16, 2020	Fort Wayne	United States	Allen County War Memorial Coliseum	7,403 / 7,403 (100%)	$896,292
February 18, 2020	Springfield	United States	JQH Arena	5,399 / 5,399 (100%)	$508,618
February 19, 2020	Wichita	United States	Intrust Bank Arena	5,847 / 5,847 (100%)	$525,987
February 21, 2020	Sioux City	United States	Tyson Events Center	4,117 / 10,100 (41%)	$360,182
February 22, 2020	Grand Forks	United States	Alerus Center	7,812 / 7,812 (100%)	$634,003
February 24, 2020	St. Paul	United States	Xcel Energy Center	8,207 / 8,207 (100%)	$729,012
February 25, 2020	Lincoln	United States	Pinnacle Bank Arena	5,323 / 15,700 (34%)	$465,690
February 29, 2020	Laughlin	United States	Laughlin Events Center^{6}	—	—
March 2, 2020	Bakersfield	United States	Mechanics Bank Arena	—	—
March 4, 2020	Los Angeles	United States	Staples Center^{7}	11,900 / 12,262 (97%)	$1,228,013
March 6, 2020	Oakland	United States	Oakland Arena	—	—
March 9, 2020	El Paso	United States	Don Haskins Center	—	—
March 10, 2020	Lubbock	United States	United Supermarkets Arena	—	—

List of 2021 concerts
Date	City	Country	Venue	Attendance	Revenue
August 18, 2021	Mansfield	United States	Xfinity Center	11,090 / 18,955 (59%)	$873,860
August 19, 2021	Bangor	United States	Darling's Waterfront Pavilion	8,186 / 11,364 (72%)	$656,640
August 21, 2021	Atlantic City	United States	Hard Rock Live at Etess Arena	4,794 / 4,805 (99%)	$858,360
August 25, 2021	Toledo	United States	Huntington Center^{8}	5,118 / 5,934 (86%)	$616,488
September 9, 2021	Irvine	United States	FivePoint Amphitheatre	—	—
September 10, 2021	Mountain View	United States	Shoreline Amphitheatre	—	—
September 12, 2021	Wheatland	United States	Toyota Amphitheatre	—	—
September 17, 2021	Ridgefield	United States	RV Inn Style Resorts Amphitheater	—	—
September 18, 2021	George	United States	The Gorge Amphitheatre	—	—
September 22, 2021	West Valley City	United States	USANA Amphitheatre	16,813 / 18,304 (92%)	$1,044,879
September 23, 2021	Sparks	United States	Nugget Event Center	—	—
September 25, 2021	Chula Vista	United States	North Island Credit Union Amphitheatre	—	—
September 26, 2021	Phoenix	United States	Ak-Chin Pavilion	—	—
September 28, 2021	Hidalgo	United States	Payne Arena	—	—
September 29, 2021	Del Valle	United States	Germania Insurance Amphitheater	8,146 / 11,881 (69%)	$754,494
October 1, 2021	Fort Worth	United States	Dickies Arena	9,658 / 9,937 (97%)	$1,251,573
October 2, 2021	Tulsa	United States	BOK Center	—	—
October 5, 2021	Biloxi	United States	Mississippi Coast Coliseum	—	—
October 6, 2021	Lafayette	United States	Cajundome	6,731 / 8,363 (80%)	$582,185
October 9, 2021	Tampa	United States	MidFlorida Credit Union Amphitheatre^{9}	—	—
October 10, 2021	Atlanta	United States	Cellairis Amphitheatre at Lakewood	9,453 / 17,742 (53%)	$771,513
October 13, 2021	Burgettstown	United States	The Pavilion at Star Lake	—	—
October 15, 2021	Clarkston	United States	DTE Energy Music Theatre	11,006 / 11,147 (99%)	$948,265
October 16, 2021	Tinley Park	United States	Hollywood Casino Amphitheatre	12,150 / 24,348 (50%)	$941,371

List of 2022 concerts
Date	City	Country	Venue	Attendance	Revenue
April 19, 2022	Santiago	Chile	Movistar Arena	27,092 / 30,152 (90%)	$2,411,511
April 20, 2022	Santiago	Chile	Movistar Arena	27,092 / 30,152 (90%)	$2,411,511
April 23, 2022	Buenos Aires	Argentina	Campo Argentino de Polo	—	—
April 26, 2022	Porto Alegre	Brazil	Arena do Grêmio	16,735 / 20,000 (84%)	$1,160,643
April 28, 2022	Curitiba	Brazil	Pedreira Paulo Leminski	18,188 / 20,500 (89%)	$1,292,931
April 30, 2022	São Paulo	Brazil	Allianz Parque	45,517 / 46,318 (98%)	$3,502,480
May 1, 2022	Ribeirão Preto	Brazil	Arena Eurobike	21,325 / 21,325 (100%)	$1,412,831
May 4, 2022	Lima	Peru	Arena 1 Costa Verde	13,096 / 15,000 (87%)	$1,242,425
May 7, 2022	Bogotá	Colombia	Movistar Arena	11,711 / 11,711 (100%)	$1,126,543
May 11, 2022	Milwaukee	United States	American Family Insurance Amphitheater	—	—
May 12, 2022	Fairborn	United States	Nutter Center	—	—
May 14, 2022	Hartford	United States	Xfinity Theatre	—	—
May 17, 2022	Raleigh	United States	Coastal Credit Union Music Park	—	—
May 19, 2022 (Note: The concert on May 19, 2022 was a part of Welcome to Rockville.)	Daytona Beach	United States	Daytona International Speedway	—N/a	—N/a
June 1, 2022	Dortmund	Germany	Westfalenhallen	—	—
June 3, 2022	Łódź	Poland	Atlas Arena	—	—
June 6, 2022	Antwerp	Belgium	Sportpaleis	—	—
June 7, 2022	Paris	France	Accor Arena	—	—
June 10, 2022 (Note: The concert on June 10, 2022 was a part of Download Festival.)	Donington	England	Donington Park	—N/a	—N/a
June 13, 2022	Hamburg	Germany	Barclaycard Arena	—	—
June 16, 2022 (Note: The concert on June 16, 2022 was a part of Copenhell.)	Copenhagen	Denmark	Refshaleøen	—N/a	—N/a
June 18, 2022	Stockholm	Sweden	Tele2 Arena	—	—
June 20, 2022	Helsinki	Finland	Helsinki Ice Hall	—	—
June 22, 2022	Gothenburg	Sweden	Scandinavium	—	—
June 24, 2022	Frankfurt	Germany	Festhalle Frankfurt	—	—
June 26, 2022	Vienna	Austria	Wiener Stadthalle	—	—
June 28, 2022	Stuttgart	Germany	Hanns-Martin-Schleyer-Halle	—	—
July 2, 2022 (Note: The concert on July 2, 2022 was a part of Barcelona Rock Fest.)	Santa Coloma de Gramenet	Spain	Parc de Can Zam	—N/a	—N/a
July 3, 2022	Madrid	Spain	WiZink Center	—	—
July 5, 2022 (Note: The concert on July 5, 2022 was a part of Festival de Nîmes.)	Nîmes	France	Arena of Nîmes	—N/a	—N/a
July 7, 2022	Zurich	Switzerland	Hallenstadion	—	—
July 9, 2022	Zagreb	Croatia	Zagreb Arena	—	—
July 11, 2022	Verona	Italy	Arena di Verona	—	—
July 13, 2022	Prague	Czech Republic	O_{2} Arena	—	—
July 14, 2022	Budapest	Hungary	Papp László Budapest Sportaréna	—	—
July 16, 2022 (Note: The concert on July 16, 2022 was a part of Rock the City.)	Bucharest	Romania	Romexpo	—	—
July 19, 2022 (Note: The concert on July 19, 2022 was a part of Paléo Festival.)	Nyon	Switzerland	Plaine de l'Asse	—N/a	—N/a
July 21, 2022	Amsterdam	Netherlands	Ziggo Dome	—	—
August 20, 2022	Melbourne	Australia	Rod Laver Arena	—	—
August 21, 2022	Melbourne	Australia	Rod Laver Arena	—	—
August 23, 2022	Melbourne	Australia	Rod Laver Arena	—	—
August 26, 2022	Sydney	Australia	Qudos Bank Arena^{10}	—	—
August 27, 2022	Sydney	Australia	Qudos Bank Arena^{10}	—	—
August 30, 2022	Adelaide	Australia	Adelaide Entertainment Centre	—	—
September 2, 2022	Perth	Australia	RAC Arena	—	—
September 6, 2022	Brisbane	Australia	Brisbane Entertainment Centre	—	—
September 10, 2022	Gold Coast	Australia	Cbus Super Stadium	—	—
September 21, 2022	West Palm Beach	United States	iTHINK Financial Amphitheatre	—	—
September 24, 2022 (Note: The concert on September 24, 2022 was a part of Louder Than Life.)	Louisville	United States	Highland Festival Grounds	—N/a	—N/a
October 7, 2022 (Note: The concert on October 7, 2022 was a part of Aftershock Festival.)	Sacramento	United States	Discovery Park	—N/a	—N/a
November 30, 2022	Tokyo	Japan	Tokyo Dome^{11}	—	—
December 4, 2022 (Note: The concert on December 4, 2022 was a part of Hell & Heaven Metal Fest.)	Toluca	Mexico	Foro Pegaso^{12}	—N/a	—N/a

List of 2023 concerts
Date	City	Country	Venue	Attendance	Revenue
April 12, 2023	Manaus	Brazil	Arena da Amazônia^{13}	—	—
April 15, 2023 (Note: The concerts on April 15, 22 and 30, 2023 were a part of Monsters of Rock.)	Bogotá	Colombia	Estadio El Campín	—N/a	—N/a
April 18, 2023	Brasília	Brazil	Estádio Nacional Mané Garrincha	—	—
April 20, 2023	Belo Horizonte	Brazil	Mineirão	—	—
April 22, 2023	São Paulo	Brazil	Allianz Parque	—N/a	—N/a
April 25, 2023	Florianópolis	Brazil	Arena Petry	—	—
April 28, 2023 (Note: The concert on April 28, 2023 was a part of Masters of Rock.)	Buenos Aires	Argentina	Parque de la Ciudad	—N/a	—N/a
April 30, 2023	Santiago	Chile	Estadio Santa Laura-Universidad Sek^{14}	—N/a	—N/a
May 27, 2023 (Note: The concert on May 27, 2023 was a part of Sonic Temple Art & Music Festival.)	Columbus	United States	Historic Crew Stadium	—N/a	—N/a
June 5, 2023	Birmingham	England	Resorts World Arena	—	—
June 6, 2023	Newcastle upon Tyne	England	Utilita Arena	—	—
June 10, 2023	Prague	Czech Republic	O_{2} Arena	—	—
June 12, 2023	Amsterdam	Netherlands	Ziggo Dome	—	—
June 13, 2023	Brussels	Belgium	Palais 12	—	—
June 15, 2023 (Note: The concert on June 15, 2023 was a part of Hellfest.)	Clisson	France	Val de Moine	—N/a	—N/a
June 17, 2023	Munich	Germany	Königsplatz	—	—
June 19, 2023	Kraków	Poland	Tauron Arena	—	—
June 21, 2023	Dresden	Germany	Messehalle	—	—
June 22, 2023	Berlin	Germany	Max-Schmeling-Halle	—	—
June 25, 2023 (Note: The concert on June 25, 2023 was a part of Rock Imperium Festival.)	Cartagena	Spain	Parque el Batel	—N/a	—N/a
June 27, 2023	Lyon	France	Halle Tony Garnier	—	—
June 29, 2023 (Note: The concert on June 29, 2023 was a part of Lucca Festival.)	Lucca	Italy	Piazza Napoleone	—N/a	—N/a
July 1, 2023	Mannheim	Germany	SAP Arena	—	—
July 2, 2023	Cologne	Germany	Lanxess Arena	—	—
July 5, 2023	London	England	The O_{2} Arena	—	—
July 7, 2023	Manchester	England	AO Arena	—	—
July 8, 2023	Glasgow	Scotland	OVO Hydro	—	—
July 12, 2023	Rättvik	Sweden	Dalhalla	—	—
July 13, 2023	Rättvik	Sweden	Dalhalla	—	—
July 15, 2023	Tønsberg	Norway	Kaldnes Vest^{15}	—	—
September 1, 2023 (Note: The concert on September 1, 2023 was a part of Crandon Rocks.)	Crandon	United States	Crandon International Raceway	—	—
October 7, 2023	Sydney	Australia	Accor Stadium^{16}	—	—
October 19, 2023	Cincinnati	United States	Heritage Bank Arena	—	—
October 20, 2023	Detroit	United States	Little Caesars Arena	—	—
October 22, 2023	Cleveland	United States	Rocket Mortgage FieldHouse	—	—
October 23, 2023	Nashville	United States	Bridgestone Arena	—	—
October 25, 2023	St. Louis	United States	Enterprise Center	—	—
October 27, 2023	Fort Worth	United States	Dickies Arena	—	—
October 29, 2023	Austin	United States	Moody Center	—	—
November 1, 2023	Thousand Palms	United States	Acrisure Arena	—	—
November 3, 2023	Los Angeles	United States	Hollywood Bowl	—	—
November 6, 2023	Seattle	United States	Climate Pledge Arena	—	—
November 8, 2023	Vancouver	Canada	Rogers Arena	—	—
November 10, 2023	Edmonton	Canada	Rogers Place	—	—
November 12, 2023	Calgary	Canada	Scotiabank Saddledome	—	—
November 13, 2023	Saskatoon	Canada	SaskTel Centre	—	—
November 15, 2023	Winnipeg	Canada	Canada Life Centre	—	—
November 18, 2023	Montreal	Canada	Centre Bell	—	—
November 19, 2023	Quebec City	Canada	Videotron Centre^{17}	—	—
November 25, 2023	Indianapolis	United States	Gainbridge Fieldhouse	—	—
November 27, 2023	Rosemont	United States	Allstate Arena	—	—
November 29, 2023	Baltimore	United States	CFG Bank Arena	—	—
December 1, 2023	New York City	United States	Madison Square Garden	—	—
December 2, 2023^{18}	New York City	United States	Madison Square Garden	—	—

- ^Note 1At this show, the band performed for 45 minutes until a storm resulted in them stopping the rest of the show.
- ^Note 2For this show, the band and the audience sang "Happy Birthday" to Gene Simmons, as he turned 70 the following day.
- ^Note 3The band and the audience sang "Happy Birthday" to the band's manager Doc McGhee who turned 69.
- ^Note 4Yoshiki made an appearance to perform "Beth" and "Rock and Roll All Nite" with the band.
- ^Note 5Yoshiki joined the band again for this show.
- ^Note 6There was no opening act for this show, as David Lee Roth's Las Vegas residency legally prevented him from performing elsewhere in Nevada.
- ^Note 7The band dedicated "Do You Love Me" to Kobe Bryant and the victims of the 2020 Calabasas helicopter crash at this show.
- ^Note 8 Simmons celebrated his birthday at this show with the band and audience singing "Happy Birthday", as he had turned 72.
- ^Note 9At this show, Simmons' platform malfunctioned during the opening song, tilting to one side. Simmons was able to maintain his balance until his platform was carefully lowered while the band performed an extended introduction.
- ^Note 10On the first of two performances in Sydney, Simmons celebrated his birthday with the band and audience singing "Happy Birthday" while being given a cake by the band's manager McGhee, as he turned 73 the day before.
- ^Note 11Kiss' final Japan performance.
- ^Note 12Kiss' final Mexico performance.
- ^Note 13Simmons performed part of the set in a chair, following the performance being paused when he felt unwell due to the high temperatures.
- ^Note 14Kiss' final South American performance.
- ^Note 15Kiss' final Europe performance.
- ^Note 16Kiss' final Australia performance.
- ^Note 17Kiss' final Canada performance.
- ^Note 18Kiss' final performance.

=== Postponed and cancelled dates ===
Date	City	Country	Venue	Reason
September 16, 2019	Oakland	United States	Oakland Arena	Postponed to March 6, 2020
September 20, 2019	Los Angeles	United States	Staples Center	Postponed to March 4, 2020
September 14, 2019	West Valley City	United States	USANA Amphitheatre	Postponed due to Simmons undergoing a medical procedure Rescheduled later to September 24, 2020
November 16, 2019	Perth	Australia	Perth Arena	Rescheduled to December 3, 2019, in place of the cancelled New Zealand show
November 19, 2019	Adelaide	Australia	Adelaide Entertainment Centre	Cancelled due to Paul Stanley's health issues
November 21, 2019	Melbourne	Australia	Rod Laver Arena	Cancelled due to Paul Stanley's health issues
November 22, 2019	Melbourne	Australia	Rod Laver Arena	Cancelled due to Paul Stanley's health issues
November 23, 2019	Newcastle	Australia	Newcastle Number 1 Sports Ground	Cancelled due to Paul Stanley's health issues
November 26, 2019	Sydney	Australia	Qudos Bank Arena	Cancelled due to Paul Stanley's health issues
November 28, 2019	Brisbane	Australia	Brisbane Entertainment Centre	Cancelled due to Paul Stanley's health issues
November 30, 2019	Melbourne	Australia	Rod Laver Arena	Cancelled due to Paul Stanley's health issues
December 3, 2019	Perth	Australia	RAC Arena	Cancelled due to Paul Stanley's health issues
December 3, 2019	Auckland	New Zealand	Spark Arena	Cancelled due to Paul Stanley's health issues
March 12, 2020	Tulsa	United States	BOK Center	COVID-19 pandemic
March 14, 2020	Lafayette	United States	Cajundome	COVID-19 pandemic
March 15, 2020	Biloxi	United States	Mississippi Coast Coliseum	COVID-19 pandemic
April 24, 2020	San Salvador	El Salvador	Estadio Jorge "Mágico" González	COVID-19 pandemic
April 28, 2020	San José	Costa Rica	Estadio Nacional	COVID-19 pandemic
April 30, 2020	Bogotá	Colombia	Movistar Arena	COVID-19 pandemic
May 2, 2020	Lima	Peru	Arena Costa Verde	COVID-19 pandemic
May 5, 2020	Santiago	Chile	Movistar Arena	COVID-19 pandemic
May 7, 2020	Asunción	Paraguay	Jockey Club del Paraguay	COVID-19 pandemic
May 9, 2020	Buenos Aires	Argentina	Campo Argentino de Polo	COVID-19 pandemic
May 12, 2020	Porto Alegre	Brazil	Arena do Grêmio	COVID-19 pandemic
May 14, 2020	Curitiba	Brazil	Pedreira Paulo Leminski	COVID-19 pandemic
May 16, 2020	São Paulo	Brazil	Allianz Parque	COVID-19 pandemic
May 17, 2020	Ribeirão Preto	Brazil	Arena Eurobike	COVID-19 pandemic
May 19, 2020	Uberlândia	Brazil	Estádio Parque do Sabiá	COVID-19 pandemic
May 21, 2020	Brasília	Brazil	Nilson Nelson Gymnasium	COVID-19 pandemic
June 12, 2020	Leicestershire	England	Download Festival	COVID-19 pandemic
June 18, 2020	Copenhagen	Denmark	Copenhell	COVID-19 pandemic
June 9, 2020	Paris	France	AccorHotels Arena	COVID-19 pandemic
June 14, 2020	Dortmund	Germany	Westfalenhallen	COVID-19 pandemic
June 15, 2020	Hamburg	Germany	Barclaycard Arena	COVID-19 pandemic
June 20, 2020	Sandnes	Norway	Øster Hus Arena	COVID-19 pandemic
June 23, 2020	Gothenburg	Sweden	Scandinavium	COVID-19 pandemic
June 25, 2020	Stockholm	Sweden	Tele2 Arena	COVID-19 pandemic
June 27, 2020	Helsinki	Finland	Hartwall Arena	COVID-19 pandemic
June 29, 2020	Kaunas	Lithuania	Žalgiris Arena	COVID-19 pandemic
July 1, 2020	Prague	Czech Republic	O_{2} Arena	COVID-19 pandemic
July 4, 2020 (Note: This concert on July 4, 2020 should have been part of Barcelona Rock Fest.)	Santa Coloma de Gramenet	Spain	Parc de Can Zam	COVID-19 pandemic
July 5, 2020	Madrid	Spain	WiZink Center	COVID-19 pandemic
July 7, 2020	Lisbon	Portugal	Altice Arena	COVID-19 pandemic
July 10, 2020	Frankfurt	Germany	Festhalle	COVID-19 pandemic
July 11, 2020	Stuttgart	Germany	Hanns-Martin-Schleyer-Halle	COVID-19 pandemic
July 13, 2020	Verona	Italy	Arena di Verona	COVID-19 pandemic
July 15, 2020	Gliwice	Poland	Gliwice Arena	COVID-19 pandemic
July 16, 2020	Budapest	Hungary	László Papp Budapest Sports Arena	COVID-19 pandemic
July 18, 2020	Sofia	Bulgaria	Armeets Arena	COVID-19 pandemic
July 21, 2020	Nyon	Switzerland	Paléo Festival	COVID-19 pandemic
July 25, 2020	Johannesburg	South Africa	Ticketpro Dome	COVID-19 pandemic
August 28, 2020	Burgettstown	United States	S&T Bank Music Park	COVID-19 pandemic
August 29, 2020	Atlantic City	United States	Boardwalk Hall	COVID-19 pandemic
August 31, 2020	Canandaigua	United States	Marvin Sands Performing Arts Center	COVID-19 pandemic
September 3, 2020	Bangor	United States	Darling's Waterfront Pavilion	COVID-19 pandemic
September 4, 2020	Mansfield	United States	Xfinity Center	COVID-19 pandemic
September 5, 2020	Hartford	United States	Xfinity Theatre	COVID-19 pandemic
September 8, 2020	Atlanta	United States	Cellairis Amphitheatre at Lakewood	COVID-19 pandemic
September 9, 2020	Raleigh	United States	Coastal Credit Union Music Park	COVID-19 pandemic
September 11, 2020	Clarkston	United States	DTE Energy Music Theatre	COVID-19 pandemic
September 13, 2020	Tinley Park	United States	Hollywood Casino Amphitheatre	COVID-19 pandemic
September 14, 2020	Fairborn	United States	Nutter Center	COVID-19 pandemic
September 15, 2020	Milwaukee	United States	American Family Insurance Amphitheater	COVID-19 pandemic
September 19, 2020	George	United States	The Gorge Amphitheatre	COVID-19 pandemic
September 20, 2020	Ridgefield	United States	Sunlight Supply Amphitheater	COVID-19 pandemic
September 22, 2020	Boise	United States	ExtraMile Arena	COVID-19 pandemic
September 24, 2020	West Valley City	United States	USANA Amphitheatre	COVID-19 pandemic
September 26, 2020	San Bernardino	United States	Glen Helen Amphitheater	COVID-19 pandemic
September 27, 2020	Chula Vista	United States	North Island Credit Union Amphitheatre	COVID-19 pandemic
September 29, 2020	Phoenix	United States	Ak-Chin Pavilion	COVID-19 pandemic
October 1, 2020	Austin	United States	Germania Insurance Amphitheater	COVID-19 pandemic
October 2, 2020	Fort Worth	United States	Dickies Arena	COVID-19 pandemic
October 4, 2020	Tulsa	United States	BOK Center	COVID-19 pandemic
October 6, 2020	Biloxi	United States	Mississippi Coast Coliseum	COVID-19 pandemic
October 7, 2020	Lafayette	United States	Cajundome	COVID-19 pandemic
November 10, 2020	Brasília	Brazil	Nilson Nelson Gymnasium	COVID-19 pandemic
November 12, 2020	Uberlândia	Brazil	Estádio Parque do Sabiá	COVID-19 pandemic
December 4, 2020	San José	Costa Rica	Estadio Nacional	COVID-19 pandemic
December 8, 2020	San Salvador	El Salvador	Estadio Jorge "Mágico" González	COVID-19 pandemic
August 22, 2021	Hartford	United States	Xfinity Theatre	Postponed due to Hurricane Henri
August 23, 2021	Hartford	United States	Xfinity Theatre	Postponed due to Hurricane Henri
August 26, 2021	Burgettstown	United States	The Pavilion at Star Lake	Postponed due to Paul Stanley and Gene Simmons contracting COVID-19
August 28, 2021	Raleigh	United States	Coastal Credit Union Music Park	Postponed due to Paul Stanley and Gene Simmons contracting COVID-19
August 29, 2021	Atlanta	United States	Cellairis Amphitheatre at Lakewood	Postponed due to Paul Stanley and Gene Simmons contracting COVID-19
September 1, 2021	Clarkston	United States	DTE Energy Music Theatre	Postponed due to Paul Stanley and Gene Simmons contracting COVID-19
September 2, 2021	Fairborn	United States	Nutter Center	Postponed due to Paul Stanley and Gene Simmons contracting COVID-19
September 4, 2021	Tinley Park	United States	Hollywood Casino Amphitheatre	Postponed due to Paul Stanley and Gene Simmons contracting COVID-19
September 5, 2021	Milwaukee	United States	American Family Insurance Amphitheater	Postponed due to Paul Stanley and Gene Simmons contracting COVID-19
September 21, 2021	Boise	United States	ExtraMile Arena	Cancelled
October 8, 2021	West Palm Beach	United States	iTHINK Financial Amphitheatre	Weather issues
October 17, 2021	Fairborn	United States	Nutter Center	Postponed
November 5, 2021	West Palm Beach	United States	iTHINK Financial Amphitheatre	Postponed
November 14, 2021	Perth	Australia	RAC Arena	COVID-19 pandemic
November 17, 2021	Adelaide	Australia	Adelaide Entertainment Centre	COVID-19 pandemic
November 20, 2021	Melbourne	Australia	Rod Laver Arena	COVID-19 pandemic
November 21, 2021	Melbourne	Australia	Rod Laver Arena	COVID-19 pandemic
November 23, 2021	Melbourne	Australia	Rod Laver Arena	COVID-19 pandemic
November 26, 2021	Sydney	Australia	Qudos Bank Arena	COVID-19 pandemic
November 27, 2021	Sydney	Australia	Qudos Bank Arena	COVID-19 pandemic
November 30, 2021	Brisbane	Australia	Brisbane Entertainment Centre	COVID-19 pandemic
December 4, 2021	Townsville	Australia	Queensland Country Bank Stadium	COVID-19 pandemic
December 29, 2021	Las Vegas	United States	Zappos Theater	Cancelled due to safety protocols
December 31, 2021	Las Vegas	United States	Zappos Theater	Cancelled due to safety protocols
January 1, 2022	Las Vegas	United States	Zappos Theater	Cancelled due to safety protocols
January 19, 2022	Las Vegas	United States	Zappos Theater	Cancelled due to safety protocols
January 21, 2022	Las Vegas	United States	Zappos Theater	Cancelled due to safety protocols
January 22, 2022	Las Vegas	United States	Zappos Theater	Cancelled due to safety protocols
January 26, 2022	Las Vegas	United States	Zappos Theater	Cancelled due to safety protocols
January 28, 2022	Las Vegas	United States	Zappos Theater	Cancelled due to safety protocols
January 29, 2022	Las Vegas	United States	Zappos Theater	Cancelled due to safety protocols
February 2, 2022	Las Vegas	United States	Zappos Theater	Cancelled due to safety protocols
February 4, 2022	Las Vegas	United States	Zappos Theater	Cancelled due to safety protocols
February 5, 2022	Las Vegas	United States	Zappos Theater	Cancelled due to safety protocols
June 30, 2022	Saint-Vulbas	France	Polo Club de la Plaine de l'Ain	Cancelled due to rain water flooding the stage
September 10, 2022	Townsville	Australia	Queensland Country Bank Stadium	Relocated due to scheduling conflicts
June 3, 2023	Plymouth	England	Home Park	Logistical issues
October 13, 2023	Dubai	United Arab Emirates	Coca-Cola Arena	—N/a
November 21, 2023	Ottawa	Canada	Canadian Tire Centre	Cancelled due to Paul Stanley contracting the flu
November 22, 2023	Toronto	Canada	Scotiabank Arena	Cancelled due to Paul Stanley contracting the flu
November 24, 2023	Knoxville	United States	Thompson-Boling Arena	Cancelled due to Paul Stanley contracting the flu

== Extra concerts ==
Date	City	Country	Venue	Event
December 31, 2020	Dubai	United Arab Emirates	Atlantis, The Palm	New Year's Eve livestream
June 11, 2021	New York City	United States	Battery Park	Biography: Kisstory premiere
September 30, 2023	Melbourne	Australia	Melbourne Cricket Ground	AFL Grand Final

== Personnel ==
=== Kiss ===
- Paul Stanley – vocals, rhythm guitar
- Gene Simmons – vocals, bass
- Eric Singer – drums, piano, vocals
- Tommy Thayer – lead guitar, vocals

=== Other ===
- Francis Stueber – introduction voice

=== Guest appearances ===
- Yoshiki – piano on "Beth", drums on "Rock and Roll All Nite" (December 11 and 17, 2019)
