= David Garibaldi (artist) =

American painter

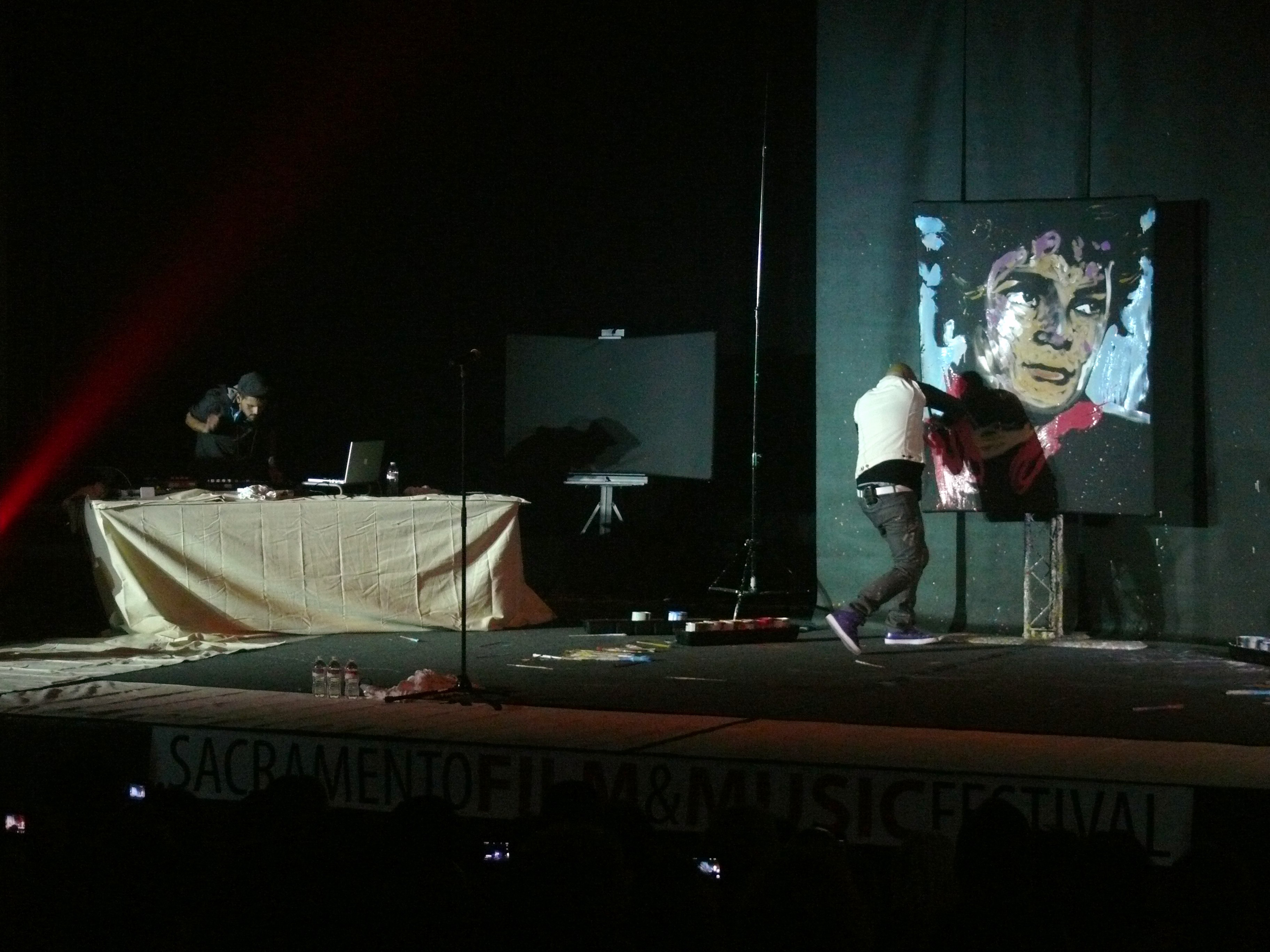
David Garibaldi paints a portrait of Michael Jackson at the 11th Annual Sacramento Film and Music Festival on July 29, 2010.

David Michael Garibaldi (born December 15, 1982) is an American performance painter. His specialty is his "Rhythm and Hue" stage act, in which he rapidly creates paintings of notable figures of popular culture.

== Early life ==
Garibaldi was born in Los Angeles, California. He attended Sheldon High School in Northern California, where he later dropped out.

== Career ==
In July 2006, Garibaldi was invited to the Rock & Roll Hall of Fame and Museum in Cleveland, Ohio, where he painted a portrait of Mick Jagger.

During the halftime of a Golden State Warriors basketball game in November 2007, Garibaldi painted guitarist Carlos Santana, after which Santana unexpectedly greeted Garibaldi and later signed the creation.

In September 2008, Garibaldi was the opening act for Blue Man Group's tour in Canada and the United States. He has also opened for Snoop Dogg.

On April 11, 2009, Garibaldi appeared on The 700 Club and painted a portrait of Jesus. On July 29, 2010, he painted his first self-portrait during a benefit performance at the 11th Annual Sacramento Film and Music Festival at the Crest Theatre, following the world premiere of Walking Dreams, a documentary about his work directed by Chad Ross. On April 20, 2012, Garibaldi painted Jeremy Lin during halftime of the New York Knicks game.

In 2012, Garibaldi appeared in the seventh season of America's Got Talent. He went to the finals with his act, David Garibaldi and His CMYK's, finishing in fourth place.

From 2019 to 2025, Garibaldi appeared as the opening act for Kiss on their End of the Road World Tour.

On December 9, 2021, Garibaldi appeared as a special guest at the Juice WRLD Day event held at Chicago's United Center where he painted several paintings of the late rapper, two of which were given to attendees.

On Martin Luther King Jr. Day in January 2022, Garibaldi painted a portrait of King during halftime of a Cleveland Cavaliers NBA game.

In 2023-2024, Garibaldi toured with Andrea Bocelli, painting onstage while Bocelli sang. Auctioning his paintings raised more than $1 million for the Andre Bocelli Foundation.

== Style ==
Although Garibaldi's work has been compared with the work of artist Denny Dent and Jean-Pierre Blanchard, his performance style is unique in its integration of choreography and storytelling.
