= Sacramento French Film Festival =

Coordinates: 38.57934°N 121.49313°W

The Sacramento French Film Festival is an annual film festival founded in 2001 held on the last two weekends of June at the Crest Theatre in Sacramento, California. It celebrates the present as well as the rich history of French cinema featuring new releases and rarely seen classics. It is the only festival dedicated to French cinema in Northern California and one of only two on the West coast. It was described in the Sacramento Bee in July 2003, as “the Cinematic Highlight of Sacramento's Summer”.

The SFFF opens each year on a Friday night with a catered reception followed by the opening film. Films continue all day long Saturday and Sunday for two consecutive weekends. Midnight movies are presented on Saturdays for mature audiences. The Festival ends on a Sunday night with an informal champagne cocktail following the closing film. All films are presented in French with English subtitles. Each film is shown either once or twice.

The Festival also has a short film program of French and locally made films. The festival posters are created by local Sacramento photographer, Kent Lacin.
