= Sonic Boom (Kiss album) =

Studio album by Kiss
- Released: October 6, 2009
- Recorded: August 2008; May–August 2009
- Studio: Conway (Hollywood, California); Henson (Hollywood, California); The Nook (Studio City)
- Genre: Hard rock; heavy metal
- Length: 43:07
- Label: Kiss, Roadrunner
- Producer: Paul Stanley, Greg Collins

Kiss chronology
| Kiss Alive 35 (2008) | Sonic Boom (2009) | Kiss Sonic Boom over Europe (2010) |

Singles from Sonic Boom
- 1. "Modern Day Delilah" Released: August 19, 2009; 2. "Say Yeah" Released: December 8, 2009; 3. "Never Enough" Released: June 8, 2010

Sonic Boom is the nineteenth studio album, and the first in 11 years, by the rock band Kiss, released on October 6, 2009. The album was recorded at Conway Recording Studios in Hollywood, Los Angeles, CA and produced by Paul Stanley and co-produced by Greg Collins. This is the first album to feature new lead guitarist Tommy Thayer as an official member, having previously appeared on 1989's Hot In The Shade as a guest musician. It also features the return of drummer Eric Singer following his return to the band in 2004. Thayer and Singer also have lead vocal performances on the album. Stanley stated, "the purpose of this album isn't to let people know that we're still around – it's to let people know we can still knock out anybody who's out there!".

== Album information ==
A fan-routed North American tour promoted the album along with international shows throughout 2010, which included the band headlining the Rock am Ring festival in Germany. The cover artwork was created by artist Michael Doret who had worked with Kiss previously to create the cover of their 1976 album Rock and Roll Over. Wal-Mart is the exclusive distributor of the album in the US and Canada, selling it as a three disc package including the album, Kiss Klassics (a completely re-recorded greatest hits album that until now had been exclusively released in Japan as Jigoku-Retsuden), and a six-song live DVD recorded April 5, 2009, in Buenos Aires, Argentina as part of the South American leg of the Kiss Alive/35 World Tour.

The album was sold as a digipak including a 20-page booklet. The album's first single was announced on the band's official website to be "Modern Day Delilah". The album was also released on limited-edition 180-gram vinyl and was pressed into five colors (red, green, black, blue and purple) with 1000 copies pressed of each. "Modern Day Delilah" was announced and released as the lead single from Sonic Boom on August 19, 2009, to radio. It was Kiss' first single release in 11 years, the last being "You Wanted the Best" released in 1998.

The music video for "Modern Day Delilah" leaked online on the first days of December and was officially released on December 9, 2009, and premiered on Yahoo!. The video is topped and tailed by footage of giant sized members of Kiss walking through Detroit. The video went on to top UK music video channel Scuzz's "Most Rockin: Viewer Request Show" chart on December 3, 2009. The single was released as downloadable content for Guitar Hero 5 and Band Hero on November 19, 2009, along with the singles "I Was Made for Lovin' You" and "Lick It Up". Modern Day Delilah peaked at No. 50 on the Billboard Rock songs chart. The song was used for their opening song for the Sonic Boom over Europe Tour and The Hottest Show on Earth Tour.

"Say Yeah" was added to the shows on the Sonic Boom Tour/Alive 35 North American Tour 2009. Later on, it was mentioned during Kiss' Facebook concert broadcast that "Say Yeah" was going to be the next single off Sonic Boom. On December 5, it was announced that the single would be released to radios on December 8. The single was released on the second week of January 2010 in Argentina. "Say Yeah" also hit No. 1 on February 5, 2010, on a Russian Radio Chart after debuting at No. 11. "Never Enough" was released as the next radio single from Sonic Boom in early June 2010 and was mentioned on Kissonline.com. The song was not incorporated into the band's setlist on its 2010 Summer Tour of the US and Canada. The song "Modern Day Delilah" was also used in 2015 for the movie Scooby-Doo! and Kiss: Rock and Roll Mystery along with the second disc's rerecorded versions of "Rock and Roll All Nite", "Shout It Out Loud", "I Was Made for Lovin' You", and "Detroit Rock City".

== Reception ==
Professional ratings
Aggregate scores
| Source | Rating |
|---|---|
| Metacritic | 57/100 |
Review scores
| Source | Rating |
| AllMusic | 3.5/5 stars |
| Consequence of Sound | 4.5/5 stars |
| Entertainment Weekly | B |
| Evening Standard | 4/5 stars |
| The Guardian | 2/5 stars |
| Los Angeles Times | 2/4 stars |
| Mojo | 3/5 stars |
| Q | 1/5 stars |
| Rolling Stone | 3/5 stars |
| Spin | 8/10 |

According to the review aggregator Metacritic, Sonic Boom received "mixed or average reviews" based on a weighted average score of 57 out of 100 from 9 critic scores. Sonic Boom debuted at No. 2 on the Billboard 200, selling 108,000 copies in its first week of release. The No. 2 position was the highest mark ever reached by the group, beating the No. 3 debut of Psycho Circus in 1998. The album finished 2009 with 238,000 units sold and finished 2010 as one of Billboard's Top 50 Rock Albums. Metal Hammer listed the album in 13th place on the list Metal Hammer Albums of 2009. Since its release, Sonic Boom has received Gold certification in Norway.

== Track listing ==
| No. | Title | Writer(s) | Lead vocals | Length |
|---|---|---|---|---|
| 1. | "Modern Day Delilah" | Paul Stanley | Stanley | 3:37 |
| 2. | "Russian Roulette" | Gene Simmons, Stanley | Simmons | 4:32 |
| 3. | "Never Enough" | Stanley, Tommy Thayer | Stanley | 3:26 |
| 4. | "Yes I Know (Nobody's Perfect)" | Simmons | Simmons | 3:02 |
| 5. | "Stand" | Stanley, Simmons | Stanley, Simmons | 4:50 |
| 6. | "Hot and Cold" | Simmons | Simmons | 3:36 |
| 7. | "All for the Glory" | Stanley, Simmons | Singer | 3:49 |
| 8. | "Danger Us" | Stanley | Stanley | 4:22 |
| 9. | "I'm an Animal" | Stanley, Simmons, Thayer | Simmons | 3:47 |
| 10. | "When Lightning Strikes" | Thayer, Stanley | Thayer | 3:45 |
| 11. | "Say Yeah" | Stanley | Stanley | 4:27 |

=== Disc two ===
Bonus CD Compilation (Kiss Klassics)
| No. | Title | Writer(s) | Lead vocals | Length |
|---|---|---|---|---|
| 1. | "Deuce" | Simmons | Simmons | 3:08 |
| 2. | "Detroit Rock City" | Stanley, Bob Ezrin | Stanley | 3:57 |
| 3. | "Shout It Out Loud" | Stanley, Simmons, Ezrin | Stanley, Simmons | 2:54 |
| 4. | "Hotter Than Hell" | Stanley | Stanley | 3:10 |
| 5. | "Calling Dr. Love" | Simmons | Simmons | 3:26 |
| 6. | "Love Gun" | Stanley | Stanley | 3:14 |
| 7. | "I Was Made for Lovin' You" | Stanley, Vini Poncia, Desmond Child | Stanley | 4:42 |
| 8. | "Heaven's on Fire" | Stanley, Child | Stanley | 3:24 |
| 9. | "Lick It Up" | Stanley, Vinnie Vincent | Stanley | 3:56 |
| 10. | "I Love It Loud" | Simmons, Vincent | Simmons | 4:09 |
| 11. | "Forever" | Stanley, Michael Bolton | Stanley | 3:53 |
| 12. | "Christine Sixteen" | Simmons | Simmons | 2:59 |
| 13. | "Do You Love Me?" | Stanley, Ezrin, Kim Fowley | Stanley | 3:39 |
| 14. | "Black Diamond" | Stanley | Singer, intro by Stanley | 4:20 |
| 15. | "Rock and Roll All Nite" | Stanley, Simmons | Simmons | 2:49 |

=== Disc three ===
DVD – Live in Buenos Aires, Argentina (Recorded on April 5, 2009, at the River Plate Stadium)

1. "Deuce"
2. "Hotter Than Hell"
3. "C'mon and Love Me"
4. "Watchin' You"
5. "100,000 Years"
6. "Rock and Roll All Nite"

== Personnel ==
Kiss

- Paul Stanley – vocals, rhythm guitar
- Gene Simmons – vocals, bass
- Tommy Thayer – lead guitar, vocals
- Eric Singer – drums, vocals

Additional personnel

- Brian Whelan – piano
- Greg Collins – co-producer, engineering, mixing
- Eric Weaver – engineering
- Valente Torrez – engineering
- Pat Woodward – engineering
- Matt "Wiggy" Wiggers – engineering
- Miles Wilson – additional engineering
- David Donnelly – mastering
- t42design – art direction, design
- Michael Doret – cover illustration
- Neil Zlozower – photography
- Dean Snowden – photography

== Charts ==
=== Weekly charts ===
Weekly chart performance for Sonic Boom
| Chart (2009) | Peak position |
|---|---|
| Australian Albums (ARIA) | 22 |
| Austrian Albums (Ö3 Austria) | 6 |
| Belgian Albums (Ultratop Flanders) | 40 |
| Belgian Albums (Ultratop Wallonia) | 47 |
| Danish Albums (Hitlisten) | 24 |
| Dutch Albums (Album Top 100) | 13 |
| European Albums Chart | 5 |
| Finnish Albums (Suomen virallinen lista) | 7 |
| French Albums (SNEP) | 31 |
| German Albums (Offizielle Top 100) | 4 |
| Hungarian Albums (MAHASZ) | 24 |
| Italian Albums (FIMI) | 12 |
| Norwegian Albums (VG-lista) | 2 |
| Scottish Albums (Official Charts) | 23 |
| Spanish Albums (Promusicae) | 32 |
| Swedish Albums (Sverigetopplistan) | 3 |
| Swiss Albums (Schweizer Hitparade) | 12 |
| UK Albums (Official Charts) | 24 |
| UK Rock & Metal Albums (Official Charts) | 3 |
| US Billboard 200 | 2 |
| US Top Hard Rock Albums (Billboard) | 1 |
| US Independent Albums (Billboard) | 1 |
| US Top Rock Albums (Billboard) | 1 |

=== Year-end charts ===
Year-end chart performance for Sonic Boom
| Chart (2009) | Position |
|---|---|
| Swedish Albums (Sverigetopplistan) | 71 |
| US Billboard 200 | 169 |
| US Top Rock Albums (Billboard) | 39 |
