= Modern Day Delilah =

Single by Kiss

from the album Sonic Boom
- Released: August 19, 2009
- Recorded: May – August 2009
- Studio: Conway Recording Studios, Hollywood, California
- Genre: Heavy metal
- Length: 3:37
- Label: Kiss Records, Universal, Roadrunner
- Songwriter: Paul Stanley
- Producers: Paul Stanley, Greg Collins

Kiss singles chronology
"You Wanted the Best" (1998)	"Modern Day Delilah" (2009)	"Say Yeah" (2009)

"Modern Day Delilah" is a song by the American hard rock band Kiss, released on their nineteenth album, Sonic Boom in 2009. It was released on August 19, 2009, as the first single off the album and the band's first single in eleven years. The song charted on US Mainstream Rock Tracks and Swedish Sverigetopplistan.

== Background ==
"Modern Day Delilah" was announced and released to radio as the lead single from Sonic Boom on August 19, 2009. The song was Kiss' first single release in 11 years, the song's predecessor being "You Wanted the Best", released in 1998 off the band's Psycho Circus album. Due to early previews of the album, the song gained positive feedback from critics and fans and has been compared to the band's '70s work. The song was played on the Kiss Alive/35 World Tour.

The music video leaked online in the first days of December, was officially released on December 9, 2009, and premiered on Yahoo! It is topped and tailed by footage of giant-sized members of Kiss walking through Detroit. The video went on to top UK music video channel Scuzz's "Most Rockin: Viewer Request Show" chart on December 3, 2009.

The single was released as downloadable content for Guitar Hero 5 and Band Hero on November 19, 2009, along with the singles "I Was Made for Lovin' You" and "Lick It Up".

"Modern Day Delilah" peaked at #50 on the Billboard Rock Songs chart. Classic Rock Magazine listed the song as the eleventh-best rock song of the past decade.

== Live appearances ==
The band first played the song in Detroit's Cobo Hall on September 25, twelve days before the release of Sonic Boom, the band's first studio album in eleven years. The song was initially performed in the middle of the concert but later played as the opening track.

== Personnel ==
- Paul Stanley – lead vocals, rhythm guitar
- Gene Simmons – bass guitar, backing vocals
- Tommy Thayer – lead guitar, backing vocals
- Eric Singer – drums, backing vocals

== Charts ==
Chart (2009)	Peak position
Sweden (Sverigetopplistan)	42
US Mainstream Rock (Billboard)	34
US Rock & Alternative Airplay (Billboard)	11
