= Alive 35 World Tour =

2008–2009 concert tour by Kiss

- Tour by Kiss
- Start date: May 9, 2008
- End date: December 13, 2009
- Legs: 5
- No. of shows: 98

Kiss concert chronology
- Hit n Run Tour (2007); Alive 35 World Tour (2008–2009); Sonic Boom over Europe Tour (2010)

The Alive 35 World Tour was a 2008–2009 concert tour by Kiss to celebrate their 35th anniversary. It was the band's first major tour since the Rock the Nation World Tour in 2004. On the tour, Kiss played in Europe for the first time since the Psycho Circus World Tour in 1999. Kiss wore Destroyer-themed costumes for the tour, but the majority of the songs played were on Alive!. The tour was highly successful and proved to be Kiss's biggest tour of Europe. This tour marked the first time Kiss visited Bulgaria, Greece, Latvia, Russia, Luxembourg, Colombia, Peru and Venezuela.

Three legs and 38 shows were announced. Kiss headlined the Download , Graspop Metal Meeting and Arrow Rock festivals in Europe as part of the tour.

The tour began on May 9 in the König-Pilsener-Arena in Oberhausen, Germany. The South America leg started on April 3 in Chile. The tour ended on December 13, 2009, in Pittsburgh after the December 15, 2009 concert in Sault Ste. Marie was postponed until summer 2010 due to inclement weather. The tour went on to gross $30,500,000 and play to over 385,000 fans in sold-out arenas from October to December 2009. Gene Simmons stated that part of the tour's success could be attributed to the success of his hit television show, Gene Simmons Family Jewels.

In the tour program for the band's final tour, Stanley reflected on the tour:

Kiss is about believing in yourself and knowing you can succeed and knowing that the people who tell you you can't succeed are the ones who failed. It's also about celebrating life. It's about enjoying life for what it is. Every day is a miracle. Just being here is Christmas every day of the year. Playing live is the ultimate but doing it right is really really hard work. I push it as far as I can. That's always the philosophy as far as playing live.

== Set list ==
| Song | Album | Times |
List of songs performed on this tour
| "Deuce" | Kiss | 98 |
| "100,000 Years" | Kiss | 98 |
| "Black Diamond" | Kiss | 98 |
| "Strutter" | Kiss | 92 |
| "Cold Gin" | Kiss | 82 |
| "Nothin' to Lose" | Kiss | 55 |
| "Firehouse" | Kiss | 4 |
| "Hotter than Hell" | Hotter than Hell | 98 |
| "Let Me Go, Rock 'n' Roll" | Hotter than Hell | 96 |
| "Parasite" | Hotter than Hell | 95 |
| "Got to Choose" | Hotter than Hell | 65 |
| "Watchin' You" | Hotter than Hell | 29 |
| "Rock and Roll All Nite" | Dressed to Kill | 98 |
| "She" | Dressed to Kill | 74 |
| "C'mon and Love Me" | Dressed to Kill | 64 |
| "Rock Bottom" | Dressed to Kill | 3 |
| "Detroit Rock City" | Destroyer | 98 |
| "Shout It Out Loud" | Destroyer | 96 |
| "King of the Night Time World" | Destroyer | 6 |
| "Do You Love Me" | Destroyer | 2 |
| "God of Thunder" | Destroyer | 1 |
| "Calling Dr. Love" | Rock and Roll Over | 33 |
| "Love Gun" | Love Gun | 97 |
| "Shock Me" | Love Gun | 33 |
| "I Stole Your Love" | Love Gun | 6 |
| "I Was Made for Lovin' You" | Dynasty | 48 |
| "I Love It Loud" | Creatures of the Night | 97 |
| "Lick It Up" | Lick It Up | 98 |
| "Forever" | Hot in the Shade | 1 |
| "Modern Day Delilah" | Sonic Boom | 47 |
| "Say Yeah" | Sonic Boom | 25 |

=== Alive 35 World Tour set list ===
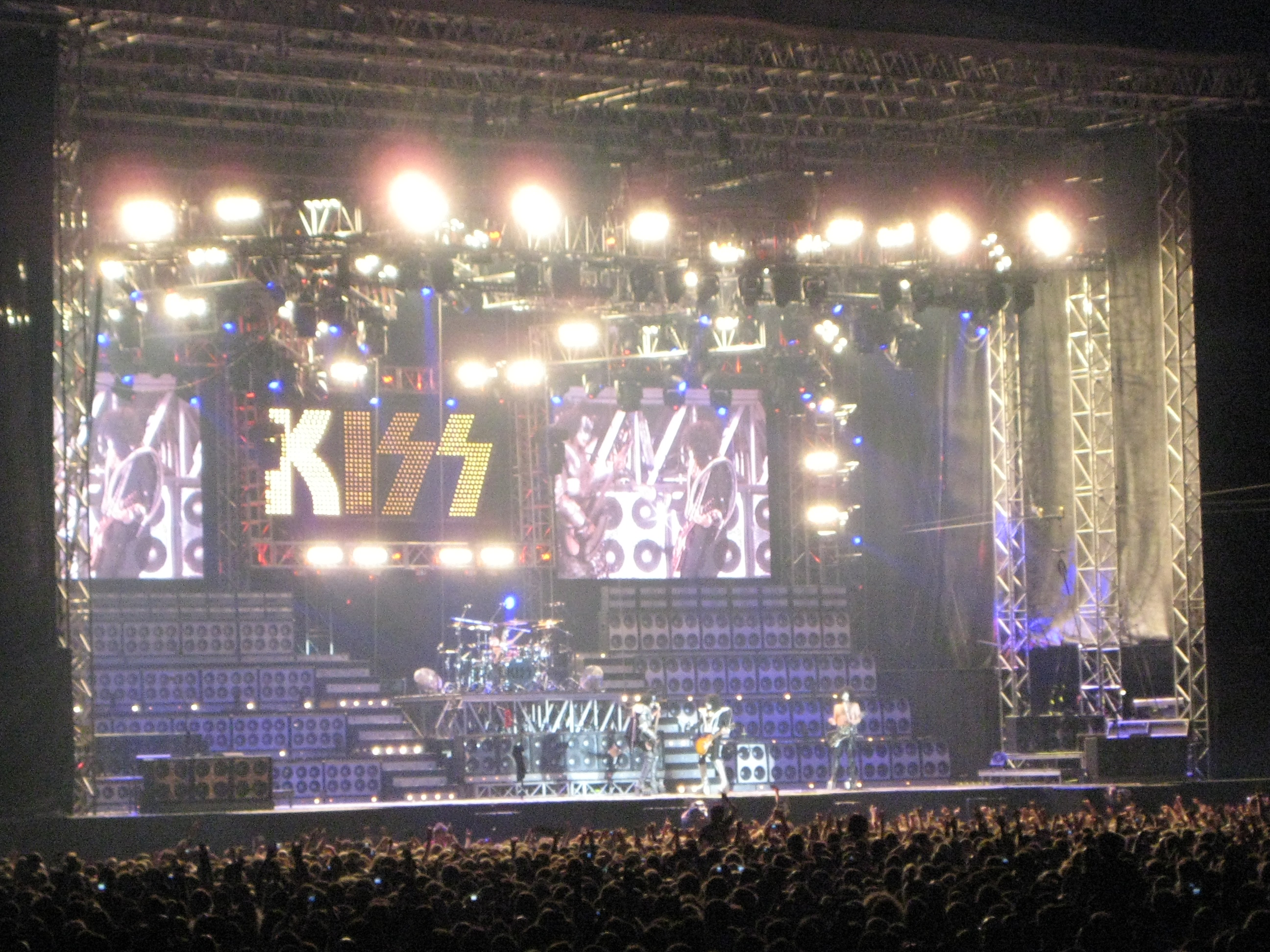
Kiss at the Stockholms Stadion in Stockholm, Sweden May 30, 2008

Kiss at the Verona Arena in Verona, Italy May 13, 2008

1. "Deuce"
2. "Strutter"
3. "Got to Choose"
4. "Hotter than Hell" (with fire breathing)
5. "Nothin' to Lose"
6. "C'mon and Love Me"
7. "Parasite"
8. "She" (with Tommy Thayer guitar solo)
9. "100,000 Years" (with drum solo)
10. "Cold Gin"
11. "Let Me Go, Rock 'n' Roll"
12. "Black Diamond"
13. "Rock and Roll All Nite"

Encore

14. "Shout It Out Loud"
15. "Lick It Up"
16. "I Love It Loud" (with bass solo)
17. "I Was Made for Lovin' You"
18. "Love Gun" (Paul Stanley flies out to the audience)
19. "Detroit Rock City"
- "Firehouse" and "Rock Bottom" only played in Oberhausen (at the first show, May 9), Munich and Vienna.
- "Watchin' You" only played in Oberhausen (at the first show, May 9), Munich, Vienna and South American shows.
- "Cold Gin" not played in Konocti Harbor.
- "I Was Made for Lovin' You" not played at Konocti Harbor and Paso Robles.
- "I Love It Loud" replaced by "God of Thunder" (with Gene Simmons solo) in Athens.
- "Forever" only played in Colombia.
- "Love Gun" not played in Rio de Janeiro.

=== Sonic Boom Tour set list ===
1. "Deuce"
2. "Strutter"
3. "Let Me Go, Rock 'n' Roll"
4. "Hotter than Hell" (with fire breathing)
5. "Shock Me"
6. "Modern Day Delilah"
7. "Calling Dr. Love"
8. "She" (with Tommy Thayer guitar solo)
9. "Parasite"
10. "100,000 Years" (with drum solo)
11. "I Love It Loud" (with bass solo)
12. "Black Diamond"
13. "Rock and Roll All Nite"

Encore

14. "Shout It Out Loud"
15. "Lick It Up"
16. "Cold Gin"
17. "Love Gun" (Paul Stanley flies out to the audience)
18. "Detroit Rock City"

=== European tour notes ===
- During Tommy Thayer's solo after "She", rockets shot from his guitar neck as Ace Frehley had done previously.
- Kiss agreed to play double dates in Helsinki after the first show sold out the venue (13000 tickets) in under seven minutes. The extra show was scheduled for the previous day.
- For several German shows, the Kiss logo on the tour program was censored due to the SS at the end of the word Kiss looking too similar to the Nazi symbol for the Schutzstaffel, which was also two angular S's. The S's were made to look more traditional and less angular.
- In Bergen and Athens, Paul Stanley didn't fly out over the audience during "Love Gun".
- In Verona, Kiss received from Music Empire Awards a 35 platinum Award for their career of 35 years.

=== South American tour notes ===
- Paul Stanley teased Buenos Aires', Lima's, Bogotá's and Caracas' audience with fragments of "Guantanamera" and "Cucurrucucú Paloma" (both sung in Spanish) before playing "Rock and Roll All Nite".
- "Love Gun" was not played at the Rio de Janeiro show due to rain conditions.
- Paul Stanley salutes the audience with "Yo no hablo muy bien español, pero conozco tus sentimientos y mi corazón es suyo" (I don't speak much Spanish, but I know your feelings and my heart is yours). He used the same phrase in their 1994 and 1997 visits.
- A day before the performance in Peru, the band were seen sightseeing and learning about the Peruvian culture.
- In Buenos Aires, Argentina the cable that was rising Simmons failed. Simmons said shortly after, "We put our lives on the line on a nightly basis all for you!", which was met with cheers from the crowd. Simmons also saluted the audience saying "Santiago" instead of "Buenos Aires". You can notice this on the Sonic Boom Bonus DVD.

=== North American tour notes ===
- "Cold Gin", "I Was Made for Lovin' You", and Gene Simmons' bass solo in "I Love It Loud" were not performed at the Konocti Harbor show on August 31 due to wind conditions.
- In Milwaukee on June 27, 2009, and in Paso Robles, California on July 28, 2009, Paul Stanley talked about Kiss' new album after "Hotter Than Hell" and he didn't fly over the audience during "Love Gun".
- In Sarnia on July 10, 2009, on Kiss sets a Bayfest attendance record of over 22,000.
- At the Bluesfest on July 15, 2009, in Ottawa, Kiss played to over 42,000.
- In Quebec City on July 16, 2009, Kiss played to a crowd of over 90,000.
- In Paso Robles on July 28, 2009, and in Montreal on October 1, 2009, Paul Stanley didn't fly over the audience.
- In Toronto on October 2, 2009, during the opening song "King of the Night Time World" the power went out in the Air Canada Centre, although they did finish the show.
- In Greenville, South Carolina on October 17, "Shock Me" and "Calling Dr. Love" were played for the first time on the American leg of the tour.
- In Philadelphia, on October 12, during Gene's bass solo, he spat blood AFTER he flew up onto the platform above. He also brought back the clock bell and the white light that hadn't been used since the Creatures of the Night Tour/10th Anniversary Tour which adds a more frightening effect to his performance.
- In Atlanta, on October 26, Kiss performed "Say Yeah" off the Sonic Boom album for the first time ever live.
- In Winnipeg on November 9, a concussion bomb (explosive) caught fire after "Black Diamond" and continued to burn for several minutes. To kill time, Kiss improvised and Simmons began to play the bassline for "Firehouse": the other members eventually joined in. The song was sung by drummer Eric Singer as the others could not access their mics while the crew dropped down the row of lights to extinguish the flame.
- On November 25, 2009, the show at the Staples Center was aired online live. The show got over 200,000 viewers.
- On November 28, 2009, in Las Vegas, Paul Stanley did not fly over the audience during "Love Gun".
- On December 4, 2009, in Austin, Texas, Kiss did not play "Shout It Out Loud" being the only date they didn't play it.

Regulars of the Alive 35 tour:

- During the Reunion Tour in 96, Ace Frehley fired rockets into the light truss during his solo. When the rocket reached the lights, there would be an explosion and a piece of the light rigging would fall. It's all part of the act. On this 2009 tour Tommy Thayer has adopted the same effect during his guitar solo.
- Paul Stanley teasing the crowd with "Stairway to Heaven" became a regular in the Alive 35 Shows.
- Tommy Thayer's Gibson Explorer was used in all encores of the Alive 35 tour, stating "I've been playing this guitar during our encores as a change of pace from my workhorse Les Pauls".
- During "Lick It Up" the band broke out "Won't Get Fooled Again" by The Who with Paul Stanley doing Roger Daltrey's yell.
- Songs such as "King of the Night time World", "Shock Me", "Cold Gin", "I Stole Your Love", "Strutter", "Calling Dr. Love" and "Nothin' to Lose" were songs that varied throughout the tour.

== Tour dates ==
List of 2008 concerts
| Date | City | Country | Venue | Opening Act(s) |
|---|---|---|---|---|
| May 9, 2008 | Oberhausen | Germany | König-Pilsener-Arena | Cinder Road |
| May 11, 2008 | Munich | Germany | Olympiahalle | Cinder Road |
| May 12, 2008 | Vienna | Austria | Wiener Stadthalle | Cinder Road |
| May 13, 2008 | Verona | Italy | Arena di Verona | Cinder Road |
| May 16, 2008 | Sofia | Bulgaria | Akademik Stadium | Cinder Road |
| May 18, 2008 | Athens | Greece | Terra Vibe Park | Cinder Road |
| May 22, 2008 | Riga | Latvia | Arena Riga | Cinder Road |
| May 24, 2008 | Moscow | Russia | Olimpiyskiy Arena | Cinder Road |
| May 26, 2008 | St. Petersburg | Russia | Ice Palace | Cinder Road |
| May 27, 2008 | Helsinki | Finland | Hartwall Areena | Cinder Road |
| May 28, 2008 | Helsinki | Finland | Hartwall Areena | Cinder Road |
| May 30, 2008 | Stockholm | Sweden | Olympic Stadium | Crooked X, Happy Pill |
| May 31, 2008 | Oslo | Norway | Vallhall Arena | Wig Wam |
| June 1, 2008 | Bergen | Norway | Koengen | |
| June 3, 2008 | Copenhagen | Denmark | Forum Copenhagen | From First to Last, Lit |
| June 4, 2008 | Hamburg | Germany | Color Line Arena | From First to Last, Lit |
| June 6, 2008 | Prague | Czech Republic | O2 Arena | From First to Last, Lit |
| June 9, 2008 | Berlin | Germany | Velodrom | From First to Last, Lit |
| June 10, 2008 | Mannheim | Germany | SAP Arena | From First to Last, Lit |
| June 11, 2008 | Oberhausen | Germany | König-Pilsener-Arena | From First to Last, Lit |
| June 13, 2008 | Castle Donington | England | Download Festival | |
| June 15, 2008 | Nijmegen | Netherlands | Arrow Rock Festival | |
| June 17, 2008 | Paris | France | Palais Omnisports de Paris-Bercy | Cinder Road |
| June 18, 2008 | Stuttgart | Germany | Schleyerhalle | Cinder Road |
| June 21, 2008 | Bilbao | Spain | Kobetasonik Festival | |
| June 23, 2008 | Zürich | Switzerland | Hallenstadion | Cinder Road |
| June 24, 2008 | Milan | Italy | Datchforum | Cinder Road |
| June 26, 2008 | Esch-sur-Alzette | Luxembourg | Rockhal | Cinder Road |
| June 27, 2008 | Nuremberg | Germany | Nuremberg Arena | Cinder Road |
| June 28, 2008 | Dessel | Belgium | Graspop Metal Meeting | |
| August 4, 2008 | Sturgis | United States | Rock'n The Rally | |
| August 29, 2008 | Las Vegas | United States | Pearl Concert Theater | Think |
| August 30, 2008 | Lake Tahoe | United States | Harvey's Outdoor Arena | ZO2 |
| August 31, 2008 | Kelseyville | United States | Konocti Harbor Amphitheatre | |

List of 2009 concerts
| Date | City | Country | Venue | Opening Act(s) |
|---|---|---|---|---|
| April 3, 2009 | Santiago | Chile | Estadio Municipal de La Florida | |
| April 5, 2009 | Buenos Aires | Argentina | River Plate Stadium | |
| April 7, 2009 | São Paulo | Brazil | Anhembi Convention Center | Dr. Sin |
| April 8, 2009 | Rio de Janeiro | Brazil | Praça da Apoteose | Libra |
| April 11, 2009 | Bogotá | Colombia | Simón Bolívar Park | |
| April 14, 2009 | Lima | Peru | National Stadium | Leusemia |
| April 17, 2009 | Caracas | Venezuela | Hipódromo La Rinconada | Arkangel |
| June 27, 2009 | Milwaukee | United States | Summerfest | |
| July 10, 2009 | Sarnia | Canada | Sarnia Bayfest | |
| July 11, 2009 | Windsor | Canada | Colosseum at Caesars Windsor | |
| July 13, 2009 | Montreal | Canada | Bell Centre | |
| July 15, 2009 | Ottawa | Canada | Ottawa Bluesfest | |
| July 16, 2009 | Quebec City | Canada | Festival d'été de Québec | Blue October |
| July 18, 2009 | Halifax | Canada | Halifax Rocks 2009 | |
| July 20, 2009 | Orillia | Canada | Casino Rama | |
| July 21, 2009 | Orillia | Canada | Casino Rama | |
| July 28, 2009 | Paso Robles | United States | California State Fair | |
| September 25, 2009 | Detroit | United States | Cobo Arena | Buckcherry |
| September 26, 2009 | Detroit | United States | Cobo Arena | Buckcherry |
| September 28, 2009 | Cleveland | United States | Quicken Loans Arena | Buckcherry |
| September 29, 2009 | London | Canada | John Labatt Centre | Buckcherry |
| October 1, 2009 | Montreal | Canada | Bell Centre | Buckcherry |
| October 2, 2009 | Toronto | Canada | Air Canada Centre | Buckcherry |
| October 3, 2009 | Uncasville | United States | Mohegan Sun Arena | Buckcherry |
| October 5, 2009 | Boston | United States | TD Garden | Buckcherry |
| October 7, 2009 | Oshawa | Canada | General Motors Centre | |
| October 9, 2009 | Uniondale | United States | Nassau Coliseum | Buckcherry |
| October 10, 2009 | New York City | United States | Madison Square Garden | Buckcherry |
| October 12, 2009 | Philadelphia | United States | Wachovia Center | Buckcherry |
| October 13, 2009 | Washington, D.C. | United States | Verizon Center | Buckcherry |
| October 16, 2009 | Hampton | United States | Hampton Coliseum | Buckcherry |
| October 17, 2009 | Greenville | United States | Bi-Lo Center | Buckcherry |
| October 19, 2009 | Pensacola | United States | Pensacola Civic Center | Buckcherry |
| October 21, 2009 | Tampa | United States | St. Pete Times Forum | Buckcherry |
| October 22, 2009 | Fort Lauderdale | United States | BankAtlantic Center | Buckcherry |
| October 24, 2009 | Birmingham | United States | BJCC Arena | Buckcherry |
| October 26, 2009 | Atlanta | United States | Philips Arena | Buckcherry |
| October 28, 2009 | Nashville | United States | Sommet Center | Buckcherry |
| October 29, 2009 | Little Rock | United States | Verizon Arena | Buckcherry |
| October 31, 2009 | New Orleans | United States | Voodoo Experience | |
| November 6, 2009 | Chicago | United States | United Center | Buckcherry |
| November 7, 2009 | Minneapolis | United States | Target Center | Buckcherry |
| November 9, 2009 | Winnipeg | Canada | MTS Centre | Buckcherry |
| November 10, 2009 | Saskatoon | Canada | Credit Union Centre | Buckcherry |
| November 12, 2009 | Calgary | Canada | Pengrowth Saddledome | Buckcherry |
| November 14, 2009 | Vancouver | Canada | General Motors Place | Buckcherry |
| November 15, 2009 | Seattle | United States | KeyArena at Seattle Center | Buckcherry |
| November 17, 2009 | Portland | United States | Rose Garden | Buckcherry |
| November 19, 2009 | Sacramento | United States | ARCO Arena | Buckcherry |
| November 21, 2009 | Fresno | United States | Save Mart Center | Buckcherry |
| November 22, 2009 | Oakland | United States | Oracle Arena | Buckcherry |
| November 24, 2009 | Anaheim | United States | Honda Center | Buckcherry |
| November 25, 2009 | Los Angeles | United States | Staples Center | Buckcherry |
| November 27, 2009 | San Diego | United States | San Diego Sports Arena | Buckcherry |
| November 28, 2009 | Las Vegas | United States | Pearl Concert Theater | Buckcherry |
| December 1, 2009 | Glendale | United States | Jobing.com Arena | Buckcherry |
| December 2, 2009 | El Paso | United States | Don Haskins Center | Buckcherry |
| December 4, 2009 | Austin | United States | Frank Erwin Center | Buckcherry |
| December 5, 2009 | Houston | United States | Toyota Center | Buckcherry |
| December 6, 2009 | Dallas | United States | American Airlines Center | Buckcherry |
| December 8, 2009 | Tulsa | United States | BOK Center | Buckcherry |
| December 10, 2009 | Kansas City | United States | Sprint Center | Buckcherry |
| December 11, 2009 | Council Bluffs | United States | Mid-America Center | Buckcherry |
| December 13, 2009 | Pittsburgh | United States | Mellon Arena | Buckcherry |

- Top 50 Worldwide Tours 2009: Kiss, #33
- Total Gross: US $36 million
- Total Attendance: 564,617
- No. of shows: 59

== Personnel ==
=== Kiss ===
- Paul Stanley – vocals, rhythm guitar
- Gene Simmons – vocals, bass
- Tommy Thayer – lead guitar, vocals
- Eric Singer – drums, vocals
