= Kiss Destroys Anaheim '76 =

Live album by Kiss
- Released: August 21, 2026
- Recorded: August 20, 1976
- Venue: Anaheim Stadium
- Genres: Hard rock; heavy metal
- Label: Universal
- Producer: Eddie Kramer

Kiss chronology
Kissworld (2017)	Kiss Destroys Anaheim '76 (2026)

Kiss Destroys Anaheim '76 is a live album by American hard rock band Kiss released on August 21, 2026. It was recorded on August 20, 1976 while Kiss was on the Destroyer Tour in support of their fourth studio album, Destroyer. Drummer Peter Criss calls it his "All-time favorite Kiss show."

To celebrate the release, original Kiss members Gene Simmons and Paul Stanley threw out the ceremonial first pitch for the Saturday, August 15, 2026 matchup between the Anaheim Angels and Kansas City Royals at Angel Stadium. Kiss' music was also played between innings and during the Saturday night fireworks display. Its release is one day late of the 50th anniversary of Kiss' performance at Anaheim Stadium in front of over 42,000 fans, their largest audience to date:

Here you’ve had a full stadium of fans, and it seemed like it all happened literally overnight, and it made no sense. We didn’t have hit singles and barely got any coverage on TV or the media. There was just this kind of word-of-mouth thing. We were always a much bigger live band, certainly in the first few years, than we were as record sellers.

–Gene Simmons

It is the actual full show, which has been available as a bootleg for years, prompting Kiss' official release from the original multi-track master tapes by producer Eddie Kramer (who worked on all three albums in Kiss' Alive! series). It is available on LP, CD and digitally.

== Track listing ==
Side one
No.	Title	Writer(s)	Lead vocals	Length
1.	"Detroit Rock City"	Paul Stanley, Bob Ezrin	Stanley
2.	"King of the Night Time World"	Stanley, Kim Fowley, Mark Anthony, Ezrin	Stanley
3.	"Let Me Go, Rock 'n' Roll"	Gene Simmons, Stanley	Simmons
4.	"Strutter"	Stanley, Simmons	Stanley

Side two
No.	Title	Writer(s)	Lead vocals	Length
5.	"Hotter than Hell"	Stanley	Stanley
6.	"Nothin' to Lose"	Simmons	Simmons, Peter Criss, Stanley
7.	"Cold Gin"	Ace Frehley	Simmons
8.	"Ace Frehley Guitar Solo"	Frehley

Side three
No.	Title	Writer(s)	Lead vocals	Length
9.	"Shout It Out Loud"	Stanley, Simmons, Ezrin	Stanley, Simmons	2:56
10.	"Do You Love Me"	Simmons, Stanley, Ezrin	Stanley	3:59
11.	"Gene Simmons Bass Solo"	Simmons
12.	"God of Thunder"	Stanley	Simmons
13.	"Peter Criss Drum Solo/God of Thunder"	Stanley, Criss	Simmons
14.	"Rock and Roll All Nite"	Stanley, Simmons	Simmons

Side four
No.	Title	Writer(s)	Lead vocals	Length
15.	"Deuce"	Simmons	Simmons
16.	"Firehouse"	Stanley	Stanley
17.	"Black Diamond"	Stanley	Criss, intro by Stanley

== Charts ==
Chart performance for Kiss Destroys Anaheim '76
Chart (2026)	Peak position
Austrian Albums (Ö3 Austria)	7
Belgian Albums (Ultratop Flanders)	13
Belgian Albums (Ultratop Wallonia)	36
Croatian International Albums (HDU)	32
Danish Vinyl Albums (Hitlisten)	2
Dutch Albums (Album Top 100)	10
Finnish Albums (Suomen virallinen lista)	15
French Albums (SNEP)	154
French Rock & Metal Albums (SNEP)	12
German Albums (Offizielle Top 100)	5
German Rock & Metal Albums (Offizielle Top 100)	2
Japanese Albums (Oricon)	20
Norwegian Albums (IFPI Norge)	61
Norwegian Rock Albums (IFPI Norge)	5
Scottish Albums (Official Charts)	25
Swedish Albums (Sverigetopplistan)	6
Swedish Hard Rock Albums (Sverigetopplistan)	1
Swiss Albums (Schweizer Hitparade)	6
UK Albums Sales (Official Charts)	47
US Billboard 200	173
US Top Rock & Alternative Albums (Billboard)	48
