= The Original Wicked Lester Sessions =

Bootlegged studio album by Wicked Lester

Studio album by Wicked Lester
- Released: Unreleased
- Recorded: November 1971 – July 1972
- Genre: Rock
- Length: 49:19
- Label: Epic Records
- Producer: Ron A. Johnson / Eddie Kramer

The Original Wicked Lester Sessions is a bootleg release of Wicked Lester's 1972 album for Epic Records. The album was recorded over a period of months when time was available at Jimi Hendrix's newly built Electric Lady Studios. A master tape cover shows the date 10.15.72. The recordings were slowed when Epic demanded the group fire guitarist Steve Coronel and replace him with Ron Leejack. When the album was completed and presented to Epic, its A&R director Don Ellis hated it and refused to release it. Reeling from the rejection and dissatisfied with the sound of the album itself, Wicked Lester members Paul Stanley and Gene Simmons left the group and formed a new incarnation of Wicked Lester, soon recruiting drummer Peter Criss and guitarist Ace Frehley and changing the newer group's name to Kiss.

In 1977, fearing Epic would release the album (which included then-rare pictures of Simmons and Stanley without makeup) to capitalize on Kiss' subsequent fame, Kiss and its label Casablanca purchased all rights to the album for $138,000, then shelved it permanently. Bootleg versions of the album appear on P2P networks. Tracks 1, 3 and 5 were released on the Kiss box set in 2001.

== Track listing ==
As the album was never officially released, there are many different song orderings available on downloaded copies, with "Love Her All I Can," "What Happens in the Darkness," "Simple Type," and "Sweet Ophelia" all serving as the opening tracks for various versions.

1. "Love Her All I Can" (2:28) Stanley
2. "Sweet Ophelia" (2:56) Barry Mann/Gerry Goffin (originally recorded by Barry Mann)
3. "Keep Me Waiting" (3:04) Stanley
4. "Simple Type" (2:33) Simmons
5. "She" (2:54) Coronel/Simmons
6. "Too Many Mondays" (3:27) Barry Mann/Cynthia Weil (originally recorded by Barry Mann)
7. "What Happens in the Darkness" (2:59) Tami Lester Smith (originally released by Infinity, (MCA/Uni 55327))
8. "When the Bell Rings" (3:11) Austin Roberts (singer)/Christopher Welch (originally released by Newport News (RCA Victor 48-1023))
9. "Molly" (aka Some Other Guy) (2:23) Stanley
10. "We Want to Shout It Out Loud" (2:04) Allan Clarke/Terry Sylvester (originally released as "I Wanna Shout" by The Hollies)
11. "Long, Long Road" (4:28) Stanley

== Personnel ==
- Paul Stanley (Stanley Eisen) – lead vocals, guitar
- Gene Simmons (Gene Klein) – lead vocals, bass
- Ron Leejack – lead guitar, banjo
- Brooke Ostrander – piano, horns
- Tony Zarrella – drums, percussion

Additional personnel

- Steve Coronel – guitar

== Sources ==
- kiss-related-recordings.nl
- kissfaq.com
