= The Originals (Kiss album) =

Box set by Kiss
- Released: July 21, 1976
- Genres: Hard rock, heavy metal
- Label: Casablanca Records

Kiss chronology
The Originals (1976)	The Box Set (2001)

Professional ratings
Review scores
Source	Rating
Allmusic	4.5/5 stars

The Originals pack was a re-release of the first three albums by the rock band Kiss: Kiss, Hotter Than Hell and Dressed to Kill. The paper sleeves holding each disc were duplicates of the original album covers. It was packaged with a 16-page history booklet, a color Kiss Army sticker, and a sheet of six trading cards.

== Reception ==
The set was released to stimulate sales of the earlier albums once Destroyer became the first Kiss studio album to go gold. It reached a peak of #36 on the US charts in September 1976.

== Track listing ==
=== Record I - Kiss ===
Side A
No.	Title	Writer(s)	Length
1.	"Strutter"	Stanley, Simmons	3:10
2.	"Nothin' to Lose"	Simmons	3:26
3.	"Firehouse"	Stanley	3:18
4.	"Cold Gin"	Frehley	4:21
5.	"Let Me Know"	Stanley	2:58

Side B
No.	Title	Writer(s)	Length
6.	"Kissin' Time"	Mann, Lowe	3:52
7.	"Deuce"	Simmons	3:05
8.	"Love Theme from KISS"	Stanley, Simmons, Frehley, Criss	2:24
9.	"100,000 Years"	Stanley, Simmons	3:22
10.	"Black Diamond"	Stanley	5:11
Total length:			35:07

=== Record II - Hotter Than Hell ===
Side A
No.	Title	Writer(s)	Length
1.	"Got to Choose"	Stanley	3:52
2.	"Parasite"	Frehley	3:01
3.	"Goin' Blind"	Simmons, Coronel	3:34
4.	"Hotter Than Hell"	Stanley	3:30
5.	"Let Me Go, Rock 'n' Roll"	Stanley, Simmons	2:16

Side B
No.	Title	Writer(s)	Length
6.	"All the Way"	Simmons	3:17
7.	"Watchin' You"	Simmons	3:45
8.	"Mainline"	Stanley	3:50
9.	"Comin' Home"	Stanley, Frehley	2:37
10.	"Strange Ways"	Frehley	3:17
Total length:			32:59

=== Record III - Dressed to Kill ===
Side A
No.	Title	Writer(s)	Length
1.	"Room Service"	Stanley	2:59
2.	"Two Timer"	Simmons	2:48
3.	"Ladies in Waiting"	Simmons	2:32
4.	"Getaway"	Frehley	2:44
5.	"Rock Bottom"	Frehley, Stanley	3:55

Side B
No.	Title	Writer(s)	Length
6.	"C'mon and Love Me"	Stanley	2:59
7.	"Anything for My Baby"	Stanley	2:34
8.	"She"	Simmons, Coronel	4:08
9.	"Love Her All I Can"	Stanley	2:41
10.	"Rock and Roll All Nite"	Stanley, Simmons	2:49
Total length:			30:09

== Charts ==
Chart (1976)	Peak position
Canada Top Albums/CDs (RPM)	54
US Billboard 200	36
