= Kissin' Time (song) =

1959 song by Bernie Lowe and Kal Mann

Single by Bobby Rydell

from the album We Got Love
- B-side: "You'll Never Tame Me"
- Released: 1959
- Length: 2:13
- Label: Cameo
- Songwriter(s): Bernie Lowe; Kal Mann

Bobby Rydell singles chronology
"Kissin' Time" (1959)	"We Got Love" (1959)

"Kissin' Time" is a song by the American rock and roll singer Bobby Rydell. It was released in 1959 on Cameo-Parkway Records. Written by Bernie Lowe and Kal Mann, the track was Rydell's first single and it would also go on to be his first Top 20 hit.

== Background ==
Bernie Lowe and Kal Mann, founders of Rydell's label, wrote "Kissin' Time". In the US, it quickly became a number 11 hit on the Hot 100, number 29 on the Hot R&B Sides chart, and number 5 in the Canadian CHUM Charts. The popularity of his first single, made Rydell (then a 17-year-old) a "teen idol", whose success was followed by a tour through Australia with The Everly Brothers, Billy "Crash" Craddock, Marv Johnson, the Champs and the Crickets. Rydell recorded a new version of "Kissin' Time" to fit Australia ("they're kissin' in Sydney. Perth and Brisbane too...").

US cities (and one state, in bold) in which it is kissin' time (Bobby Rydell version).
Australian cities in which it is kissin' time.

== Kiss version ==
"Kissin' Time"

Single by Kiss

from the album Kiss
- B-side: "Nothin' to Lose"
- Released: May 10, 1974 (US)
- Recorded: April 26, 1974
- Studio: Bell, New York City
- Genre: Hard rock; glam rock
- Length: 3:52
- Label: Casablanca; Warner Bros.
- Songwriter(s): Bernie Low; Kal Mann
- Producer(s): Kenny Kerner; Richie Wise

Kiss singles chronology
"Nothin' to Lose" (1974)	"Kissin' Time" (1974)	"Strutter" (1974)

Kiss track listing
- 10 tracks: 1. "Strutter"; 2. "Nothin' to Lose"; 3. "Firehouse"; 4. "Cold Gin"; 5. "Let Me Know"; 6. "Kissin' Time"; 7. "Deuce"; 8. "Love Theme from KISS"; 9. "100,000 Years"; 10. "Black Diamond"

In 1974, the hard rock band Kiss released its eponymous debut album. The record struggled to stay on the charts and the group was in need of a single that would help. Neil Bogart, founder of the band's record company Casablanca Records, knew that a single could save the record. He ordered the band to record "Kissin' Time", hoping that it would achieve the same success as it had for Rydell. The single first had to be drastically reworked because of lines like "They're smoochin' all over, even in St. Lou."

A song with lyrics like the original ones were ill-suited to Kiss' then leather-clad style. Kenny Kerner, one of the album producers, said about the reworking of the song: "We sat there, we all had pads and pencils, and we just went around the board. And we went, 'Alright, well... they're Kissin' in'... and somebody would go, 'Detroit'! And we'd go, 'Alright, they're kissin' in Detroit.' And that's how it went. We re-wrote the song in like twenty minutes." The band members were not thrilled with the record company's decision to record the song and later feature it on the album, but they were pressured into going along.

Cash Box said that "the melody is 'Sweet Little Sixteen' (or 'Surfin' U.S.A.'," take your pick), but the energy level is at a new high."

"Kissin' Time" was released three months after the initial release of the album, but was not included on the album until July 1974. Sung by Kiss members Gene Simmons, Paul Stanley and Peter Criss, the song did not achieve anywhere near the success of Rydell's original, reaching only number 83 on the US Pop Charts and 79 on US Cashbox. Despite the anemic performance of the song on the charts, Kiss climbed to a relatively high number 87 position.

US cities (and one state, in bold) in which it is kissin' time (Kiss version).

== Live performances ==
"Kissin' Time" was performed for a short period while the single and promotion were active, and then the band dropped the song until the 2006 Rising Sun Tour where they, to the surprise of the fans, performed it alongside the previously unplayed "Love 'Em and Leave 'Em". An acoustic version was performed on July 23, 2015, at the San Manuel Indian Casino in Highland, California.

== Appearances ==
"Kissin' Time" has appeared on following Kiss albums:

- Kiss – studio version
- The Originals – studio version
- Kiss Chronicles: 3 Classic Albums – studio version

== Track listing ==
- A-side – "Kissin' Time"
- B-side – "Nothin' to Lose"

== Personnel ==
- Gene Simmons – bass, co-lead vocals
- Paul Stanley – rhythm guitar, co-lead vocals
- Peter Criss – drums, co-lead vocals
- Ace Frehley – lead guitar

== Charts ==
Chart (1974)	Peak position
US Billboard Hot 100	83
