= Kiss My Ass: Classic Kiss Regrooved =

Compilation album by Various Artists
- Released: June 21, 1994
- Genre: Hard rock, rock, Alternative rock, Country
- Length: 45:44; 49:12 (Bonus Track Version)
- Label: Mercury
- Producer: Various

Kiss My Ass: Classic Kiss Regrooved is a 1994 tribute album, featuring a variety of artists covering songs by the American rock band Kiss. Released to coincide with Kiss' 20th anniversary, the album was certified gold by the RIAA, and spent 13 weeks on the charts. Cover Design and Art Direction by Mitchell Kanner.

== Overview ==
=== Cover art and title ===
The rights to Ace Frehley's makeup were not cleared in time for release of the CD, hence the inclusion of a hybrid form of Paul Stanley's "Bandit" design that was briefly used in some early shows and promotional photos. Censored variations of the album cover had the title changed to "Kiss my A**" to appease family-friendly retail chains. The cover art was directed and designed by Mitchell Kanner.

The album title provided inspiration for another Kiss tribute album, Kiss My Ankh. This album contains only songs written by former Kiss guitarist Vinnie Vincent whose make-up design consisted of a golden ankh cross on his face.

Canadian, Japanese and Australian copies of the album have their respective flags in place of the American flag of the U.S. version.

=== Composition ===
"Hard Luck Woman" was performed by Kiss themselves with award-winning country singer Garth Brooks (who had admitted to being a big fan of the band during some interviews) on lead vocals.

"Calling Dr. Love" was performed by one-off band Shandi's Addiction, made up of vocalist Maynard James Keenan (Tool), guitarist Tom Morello (Rage Against the Machine, Audioslave), bassist Billy Gould (Faith No More), and drummer Brad Wilk (Rage Against the Machine, Audioslave).

"Strutter", performed by Extreme, is an unusual recording, as it also incorporates the main riff to "God of Thunder" in the middle section prior to and during Nuno Bettencourt's guitar solo, the vocal opening to "Heaven's on Fire" into the reprisal of the lyric "But when she wants/She'll pass you by", and the chorus of "Shout It Out Loud" sung by the backing vocalist. Also, after the song has ended, Gary Cherone sings the introductory guitar lick to "Love Gun", and Nuno Bettencourt plays the first few notes of "Detroit Rock City".

Gene Simmons initially requested Yoshiki (of rock group X Japan) to put "I" into an orchestral context, but Yoshiki preferred "Black Diamond". It retains the basic structure of Kiss's version, using piano, strings and timpani in place of the traditional electric guitar, bass and drums, and was performed by the American Symphony Orchestra. Yoshiki's piece was initially only going to be included on the Japanese edition of the album, but Simmons liked it so much it was added to the track list of all editions.

== Reception ==
Professional ratings
Review scores
Source	Rating
AllMusic	2/5 stars
Entertainment Weekly	B
Los Angeles Times	2/4 stars
MusicHound Rock	3/5 stars
Rolling Stone	3/5 stars

The album was released to generally mixed reviews. Deborah Frost from Entertainment Weekly commented how many songs ("Christine Sixteen" and "Rock & Roll All Night") were turned from "adolescent fantasies into bittersweet nostalgia", sounded even more inane the umpteenth time around ("Plaster Caster" and "Hard Luck Woman"), and [Deuce] "achieve[ed] what Kiss, no matter how hard it humps or thumps, never has and never will: It swings". For Chris William from the Los Angeles Times the "hewing yawningly close to the period-piece originals" are Gin Blossoms, Anthrax, Extreme and the Lemonheads. Lenny Kravitz was "at least well-suited to shift 'Deuce' from one '70s subgenre to another, though he runs out of ideas—and of song—a minute in", Garth Brooks seemed unrecognizable, while Dinosaur Jr. did the "happiest transfer". Andrea Odintz from Rolling Stone described it as "a celebration of unabashed pleasures of vintage hard rock, and the ingenuity award must go to Yoshiki for his instrumental orchestral arrangement."

In a posthumous review JT Griffith from AllMusic said that the album appealed neither to die-hard Kiss fans nor to pop radio listeners, but was probably more popular within fans of the individual bands participating in this project. Although "Detroit Rock City" was released as a single, he personally considered "Hard Luck Woman" as the most popular from the set, "Deuce" the most interesting interpretation, "Christine Sixteen" the most faithful, and the slowed-down version of "Rock & Roll All Night" as the most daring.

== Track listing ==
No.	Title	Writer(s)	Artist	Length
1.	"Deuce"	Simmons	Lenny Kravitz	4:10
2.	"Hard Luck Woman"	Stanley	Garth Brooks	3:14
3.	"She"	Simmons; Stephen Coronel	Anthrax	4:53
4.	"Christine Sixteen"	Simmons	Gin Blossoms	3:09
5.	"Rock and Roll All Nite"	Stanley; Simmons	Toad the Wet Sprocket	2:54
6.	"Calling Dr. Love"	Simmons	Shandi's Addiction	4:51
7.	"Goin' Blind"	Simmons; Coronel	Dinosaur Jr.	3:24
8.	"Strutter"	Stanley; Simmons	Extreme	4:39
9.	"Plaster Caster"	Simmons	The Lemonheads	3:02
10.	"Detroit Rock City"	Stanley; Bob Ezrin	The Mighty Mighty Bosstones	4:21
11.	"Black Diamond"	Stanley	Yoshiki	7:07
Total length:				45:44

Bonus track
No.	Title	Writer(s)	Artist	Length
12.	"Unholy" (German Version)	Simmons; Vinnie Vincent	Die Ärzte	3:28
Total length:				49:12

== Charts ==
Album - Billboard (North America)

Year	Chart	Position
1994	The Billboard 200	19

Singles - Billboard (North America)

Year	Chart	Single	Position
1994	Mainstream Rock Tracks	"Deuce"	11
1994	Adult Contemporary	"Hard Luck Woman"	28
1994	Hot Country Singles & Tracks	"Hard Luck Woman"	67
1994	Top 40 Mainstream	"Hard Luck Woman"	26
