= The Box Set (Kiss) =

Box set by Kiss
- Released: November 20, 2001
- Recorded: 1966–1999
- Genres: Hard rock, heavy metal
- Length: 6:04:13
- Labels: Mercury; Universal
- Producer: Various

Kiss chronology
The Originals (1976)	The Box Set (2001)	Kiss Chronicles: 3 Classic Albums (2005)

The Box Set is a five-CD collection of recordings drawn from the Kiss archives reportedly selected by the band. The Box Set includes 94 tracks, including 30 previously unreleased band and solo demos, outtakes, live recordings, and a 120-page color booklet with track-by-track commentary by band members Gene Simmons, Paul Stanley, Ace Frehley, and Peter Criss, detailed track information, photos and essays. A limited number of the set were released in a guitar case-shaped box.

== Reception ==
Professional ratings
Review scores
Source	Rating
AllMusic	4/5 stars

The Box Set peaked at #128 on the Billboard 200 and was certified gold by the RIAA on December 18, 2001.

== Track listing ==
Disc 1: 1966–1975
No.	Title	Original Album	Length
1.	"Strutter" (demo version)	previously unreleased	4:59
2.	"Deuce" (demo version)	previously unreleased	3:26
3.	"Keep Me Waiting" (performed by Wicked Lester)	1972 ~ Wicked Lester (Unreleased album)	3:26
4.	"She" (performed by Wicked Lester)	1972 ~ Wicked Lester (unreleased album)	3:08
5.	"Love Her All I Can" (performed by Wicked Lester)	1972 ~ Wicked Lester (unreleased album)	2:42
6.	"Let Me Know" (demo version)	previously unreleased	3:38
7.	"100,000 Years" (demo version)	previously unreleased	5:48
8.	"Stop, Look to Listen" (Paul Stanley 1966 demo)	previously unreleased	4:02
9.	"Leeta" (Gene Simmons 1969 demo)	previously unreleased	2:28
10.	"Let Me Go, Rock 'n' Roll" (demo version)	previously unreleased	4:06
11.	"Acrobat" (live in 1973)	previously unreleased	6:21
12.	"Firehouse" (demo version)	previously unreleased	4:37
13.	"Nothin' to Lose"	1974 ~ Kiss	3:27
14.	"Black Diamond"	1974 ~ Kiss	5:12
15.	"Hotter Than Hell"	1974 ~ Hotter Than Hell	3:31
16.	"Strange Ways"	1974 ~ Hotter Than Hell	3:20
17.	"Parasite"	1974 ~ Hotter Than Hell	3:03
18.	"Goin' Blind"	1974 ~ Hotter Than Hell	3:37
19.	"Anything for My Baby"	1975 ~ Dressed to Kill	2:34
20.	"Ladies in Waiting"	1975 ~ Dressed to Kill	2:32
21.	"Rock and Roll All Nite"	1975 ~ Dressed to Kill	2:46

Disc 2: 1975–1977
No.	Title	Original Album	Length
1.	"C'mon and Love Me" (live in 1975)	1975 ~ Alive!	3:09
2.	"Rock Bottom" (live in 1975)	1975 ~ Alive!	3:21
3.	"Cold Gin" (live in 1975)	1975 ~ Alive!	6:40
4.	"Watchin' You" (live in 1975)	1975 ~ Alive!	3:56
5.	"Doncha Hesitate" (unreleased demo)	previously unreleased	2:40
6.	"Mad Dog" (unreleased demo)	previously unreleased	2:33
7.	"God of Thunder" (demo version)	previously unreleased	2:54
8.	"Great Expectations"	1976 ~ Destroyer	4:21
9.	"Beth"	1976 ~ Destroyer	2:46
10.	"Do You Love Me"	1976 ~ Destroyer	3:33
11.	"Bad, Bad Lovin'" (Calling Dr. Love demo)	previously unreleased	3:35
12.	"Calling Dr. Love"	1976 ~ Rock and Roll Over	3:43
13.	"Mr. Speed" (demo version)	previously unreleased	3:34
14.	"Christine Sixteen"	1977 ~ Love Gun	3:14
15.	"Hard Luck Woman"	1976 ~ Rock and Roll Over	3:35
16.	"Shock Me"	1977 ~ Love Gun	3:48
17.	"I Stole Your Love"	1977 ~ Love Gun	3:06
18.	"I Want You" (1977 soundcheck)	previously unreleased	3:31
19.	"Love Gun" (demo version)	previously unreleased	3:23
20.	"Love Is Blind" (unreleased demo)	previously unreleased	2:46

Disc 3: 1976–1982
No.	Title	Original Album	Length
1.	"Detroit Rock City" (without intro)	1976 ~ Destroyer	3:55
2.	"King of the Night Time World" (live in 1977)	1977 ~ Alive II	3:04
3.	"Larger Than Life"	1977 ~ Alive II	4:00
4.	"Rocket Ride"	1977 ~ Alive II	4:07
5.	"Tonight You Belong to Me"	1978 ~ Paul Stanley	4:40
6.	"New York Groove" (Hello cover)	1978 ~ Ace Frehley	3:00
7.	"Radioactive" (demo version)	previously unreleased	3:10
8.	"Don't You Let Me Down"	1978 ~ Peter Criss	3:41
9.	"I Was Made for Lovin' You"	1979 ~ Dynasty	4:30
10.	"Sure Know Something"	1979 ~ Dynasty	4:00
11.	"Shandi"	1980 ~ Unmasked	3:36
12.	"You're All That I Want, You're All That I Need" (demo version) (recorded in 1977)	previously unreleased	4:17
13.	"Talk to Me" (live in 1980)	previously unreleased	3:41
14.	"A World Without Heroes"	1981 ~ Music From "The Elder"	2:41
15.	"The Oath"	1981 ~ Music From "The Elder"	4:34
16.	"Nowhere to Run"	1982 ~ Killers	4:26
17.	"Creatures of the Night" (1985 remix)	1982 ~ Creatures of the Night	4:03
18.	"War Machine"	1982 ~ Creatures of the Night	4:15
19.	"I Love It Loud"	1982 ~ Creatures of the Night	4:16

Disc 4: 1983–1989
No.	Title	Original Album	Length
1.	"Lick It Up"	1983 ~ Lick It Up	3:56
2.	"All Hell's Breakin' Loose"	1983 ~ Lick It Up	4:34
3.	"Heaven's on Fire"	1984 ~ Animalize	3:21
4.	"Get All You Can Take"	1984 ~ Animalize	3:44
5.	"Thrills in the Night"	1984 ~ Animalize	4:22
6.	"Tears Are Falling"	1985 ~ Asylum	3:55
7.	"Uh! All Night"	1985 ~ Asylum	4:04
8.	"Time Traveler" (unreleased demo)	previously unreleased	4:58
9.	"Hell or High Water"	1987 ~ Crazy Nights	3:26
10.	"Crazy Crazy Nights"	1987 ~ Crazy Nights	3:47
11.	"Reason to Live"	1987 ~ Crazy Nights	4:01
12.	"Let's Put the X in Sex"	1988 ~ Smashes, Thrashes & Hits	3:50
13.	"Hide Your Heart"	1989 ~ Hot in the Shade	4:25
14.	"Ain't That Peculiar" ("Little Caesar" demo)	previously unreleased	3:11
15.	"Silver Spoon"	1989 ~ Hot in the Shade	4:41
16.	"Forever" (single remix)	1989 ~ Hot in the Shade	3:51

Disc 5: 1991–1999
No.	Title	Original Album	Length
1.	"God Gave Rock 'n' Roll to You II"	1992 ~ Revenge	5:20
2.	"Unholy" (without intro)	1992 ~ Revenge	3:25
3.	"Domino" (demo version)	previously unreleased	4:03
4.	"Every Time I Look at You"	1992 ~ Revenge	4:40
5.	"Comin' Home" (live unplugged in 1995)	1996 ~ Kiss Unplugged	2:51
6.	"Got to Choose" (live unplugged in 1995 edit)	1996 ~ Kiss Unplugged (Japanese release)	3:32
7.	"I Still Love You" (live unplugged in 1995)	1996 ~ Kiss Unplugged	6:09
8.	"Nothin’ to Lose" (live unplugged in 1995)	1996 ~ Kiss Unplugged	3:49
9.	"Childhood's End" (Coda ending version)	1997 ~ Carnival of Souls: The Final Sessions	5:27
10.	"I Will Be There"	1997 ~ Carnival of Souls: The Final Sessions	3:49
11.	"Psycho Circus" (without intro)	1998 ~ Psycho Circus	4:51
12.	"Into the Void"	1998 ~ Psycho Circus	4:23
13.	"Within" (without intro)	1998 ~ Psycho Circus	4:29
14.	"I Pledge Allegiance to the State of Rock & Roll"	1998 ~ Psycho Circus	3:34
15.	"Nothing Can Keep Me From You" (soundtrack album)	1999 ~ Detroit Rock City	4:04
16.	"It's My Life"	previously unreleased	3:46
17.	"Shout It Out Loud" (live in 1996)	1997 ~ Greatest Kiss	3:38
18.	"Rock and Roll All Nite" (live in 1999)	previously unreleased	6:07

Notes
1.Later released on the 2014 Deluxe Edition of Love Gun.
2.Later released on Alive! The Millennium Concert.

== Charts ==
Chart (2001)	Peak position
US Billboard 200	128

== Certifications ==
Region	Certification	Certified units/sales
United States (RIAA)	Gold	500,000^{^}
^{^} Shipments figures based on certification alone.
