= Cold Gin =

Song by Kiss

from the album Kiss
- Released: February 18, 1974
- Recorded: November 1973
- Genre: Hard rock; glam rock; heavy metal
- Length: 4:22
- Label: Casablanca
- Songwriter: Ace Frehley
- Producers: Kenny Kerner, Richie Wise

Kiss track listing
- 10 tracks: 1. "Strutter"; 2. "Nothin' to Lose"; 3. "Firehouse"; 4. "Cold Gin"; 5. "Let Me Know"; 6. "Kissin' Time"; 7. "Deuce"; 8. "Love Theme from KISS"; 9. "100,000 Years"; 10. "Black Diamond"

"Cold Gin" is a song by American rock band Kiss, written by the band's lead guitarist Ace Frehley and released in 1974 on their eponymous debut album. The song has appeared on many Kiss live and compilation albums. Live versions of the song were often extended for about two minutes due to Frehley's soloing.

Guitar World listed "Cold Gin" as No. 7 on their list of greatest drinking songs. The track is No. 14 on Liquor.com's list of top 15 drinking songs and ranked No. 32 of the 50 best drinking songs on TimeOut.com.

== Background ==
"Cold Gin" is about a person suffering from poverty, loneliness, and alcoholism. However, the song's meaning is widely misinterpreted to be about a struggling couple who uses alcohol to cope with a toxic relationship or about how cold gin affects the male sex drive, but thorough lyrical analysis shows this is not the case. Ace Frehley confirms what the song is about in his 2011 book No Regrets.

Frehley said he wrote the song while he was on the subway. According to Frehley, the riff for the song was inspired by the song "Fire and Water" by English rock group Free. Gene Simmons actually wrote the bridge, according to Frehley, though Simmons turned down a writing credit: "Back then, it was definitely more of a brotherhood. It didn't matter who got credit, the only thing that mattered was if the song was good". The song was recorded in 1973 and was one of two songs from the band's debut album written by Frehley, the other being the album's instrumental, "Love Theme from KISS", which was written by the whole band. Although "Cold Gin" was never released as a single, it has remained a concert staple during the years.

The studio version differs significantly from the demo version. In the demo, after the solo, Paul Stanley shouts "Whoa! Alright! C'mon!", but in the studio version, he shouts "Whoa yeah!". The second guitar solo was also cut and the outro was shortened.

As Frehley was insecure about his singing ability, Simmons, despite being a teetotaler, sang the song on the original studio version and in most live versions, although Frehley sang parts of the song during the Alive/Worldwide Tour; Frehley also sang the lead when performing "Cold Gin" with his solo band.

== Live performances ==
"Cold Gin" soon became a fan favorite, with the band performing it on subsequent tours (the song was also featured on Kiss's breakthrough album Alive!) but it would be dropped for the Love Gun Tour and the band did not play the song for three years, until the Unmasked Tour. The band once again dropped the song from the setlist for the Aerosmith/Kiss co-headlined Rocksimus Maximus Tour/World Domination Tour but returned it for the Kiss Alive/35 World Tour.

Frehley performed "Cold Gin" during his solo tours, along with other Kiss songs.

== Appearances ==
"Cold Gin" appeared on the following Kiss releases:

- Kiss - original studio version
- Alive! - live version of the song
- The Originals - studio version
- Double Platinum - studio version
- Killers - studio version
- Greatest Kiss - studio version
- The Box Set - Alive! version
- Gold - Alive! version
- Kiss Chronicles: 3 Classic Albums - studio version
- Kiss Alive! 1975–2000 - Alive! version - song was mistakenly credited to Stanley instead of Frehley
- Kiss Alive 35 - live version
- Ikons - studio version
- Kiss Sonic Boom Over Europe - live version

== Covers ==
- Chyme-Dyne's version appeared on the band's 1985 album Bad Luck With Fast Food
- Death Angel covered the song on their 1988 album Frolic Through the Park.
- Pantera and Skid Row performed the song together live while the bands were on tour in 1992. The performance was taped and later included on Pantera's 2000 home video 3 Vulgar Videos from Hell. At one concert, Frehley appeared as a special guest.
- A version by L.A. Guns appeared on 1997 compilation album Return of the Comet (A Tribute to Ace Frehley) and on their 1998 EP Wasted.
- Necro Tonz covered "Cold Gin" on their 1997 album Are You Dead Yet?
- Swedish musician Håkan Hemlin covered the song for the 1997 compilation album KISS Covered in Scandinavia.
- Bernard Edwards Project Homicide covered the song on their 2000 album Bernard Edwards Project Homicide.
- "Cold Gin" was covered by alternative metal group Disturbed at a one-time tribute show to Pantera guitarist "Dimebag" Darrell Abbott on February 23, 2005. It was known to be the guitarist's favorite song. The live performance included members of Drowning Pool and Anthrax, and featured David Draiman on vocals and Abbott's brother Vinnie Paul on drums.
- Shotgun Sacred's version appeared on the band's 2005 EP A Dark New Order.
- Swiss thrash metal band Gurd covered the song on their 2009 album Your Drug of Choice.
- Finnish melodic death metal band Kalmah covered the song as a bonus track on the Japanese edition of their 2013 album Seventh Swamphony.
- White Light Cemetery covered the song on their 2013 self-titled debut album, with Kirk Windstein of Crowbar providing vocals.
- Ace Frehley plays a cover version of the song on his solo album Origins, Vol. 1, with Mike McCready of Pearl Jam on guitar.
- Silverchair played the song between 1994 and 1995.
- Warrior Soul recorded a version on their covers album Cocaine And Other Good Stuff, in 2020.

== Personnel ==
- Gene Simmons – lead vocals, bass
- Paul Stanley – rhythm guitar, backing vocals
- Peter Criss – drums
- Ace Frehley – lead guitar
