= Arrow Rock Festival =

Rock festival in the Netherlands

Arrow Rock Festival was a rock festival that took place on a yearly basis since 2003 in the Netherlands. This festival presented mostly classic rock bands. The original location for the festival was Lichtenvoorde; until 2007 when the venue changed to Biddinghuizen. 2008 saw another location change, this time to Goffertpark, Nijmegen 51°49′26″N 5°50′3″E. In 2009 the festival was cancelled, because of difficulties with the line-up. In 2010 the festival was cancelled because Aerosmith organised their own event in Goffertpark.

== 2003 ==
On 27 June 2003 was the first edition of the Arrow Rock Festival. The line-up was:

1. Deep Purple
2. Lynyrd Skynyrd
3. Status Quo
4. Uriah Heep
5. L.A. Doors
6. Wishbone Ash
7. Manfred Mann's Earth Band
8. Budgie
9. Y&T
10. Thin Lizzy

== 2004 ==
2004's line-up (after the performances of Anouk & David Bowie were moved to the Amsterdam Arena and White Lion, Herbert Grönemeyer & Porcupine Tree cancelled):

1. Alice Cooper
2. Paul Rodgers
3. Blaze of Glory
4. Blue Öyster Cult
5. Brothers in Arms
6. Caravan
7. Eric Burdon & The Animals
8. Fish
9. G3 feat. Joe Satriani, Steve Vai & Robert Fripp
10. Golden Earring
11. Heart
12. Iron Butterfly
13. Judas Priest
14. Montrose
15. Motörhead
16. Plaeto
17. Queensrÿche
18. Saga
19. Scorpions
20. Symphony X
21. Ten Years After
22. The Godz
23. The Quill
24. UFO
25. Y&T
26. Yes

== 2005 ==
On 11 June the 2005 edition took place, with:

1. Little River Band
2. Styx
3. Kansas
4. Crosby, Stills & Nash
5. Meat Loaf
6. Thunder
7. Glenn Hughes
8. Survivor
9. Lou Gramm
10. Dream Theater

== 2006 ==
Pré Party Thursday 8 June:

Rock Palace:

- 19.00 - 19.50: SQY Rockin' Team
- 20.10 - 21.10: Clearwater
- 21.30 - 22.30: Wishbone Ash
- 23.00 - 00.00: Bintangs

Friday 9 June:

Rock Palace:

- 14.30 - 15.30: John Waite
- 16.30 - 17.30: Uriah Heep
- 18.45 - 19.45: George Thorogood & The Destroyers
- 21.15 - 22.30: Journey

Rock Garden:

- 13.30 - 14.30: Blackfoot
- 15.30 - 16.30: Ted Nugent
- 17.30 - 18.45: Whitesnake
- 19.45 - 21.15: Status Quo
- 22.30 - 00.00: Deep Purple

Saturday 10 June:

Rock Palace:

- 14.00 - 15.00: Riverside
- 16.00 - 17.00: Pavlov's Dog
- 18.00 - 19.00: Dio
- 20.00 - 21.15: Queensrÿche

Rock Garden:

- 15.00 - 16.00: Porcupine Tree
- 17.00 - 18.00: Ray Davies
- 19.00 - 20.00: Def Leppard
- 21.15 - 00.15: Roger Waters

Roger Waters gave a 3-hour show with quadraphonic sound. The first half he played songs from Pink Floyd and his solo albums, the second half he performed the complete Pink Floyd album The Dark Side of the Moon.

== 2007 ==
Friday 30 June:

Rock Garden:

- 21.15 - 22.45: Aerosmith
- 19.05 - 20.30: Toto
- 17.00 - 18.15: Riders On The Storm
- 15.15 - 16.30: Scorpions
- 13.30 - 14.30: INXS

Rock Palace:

- 18.45 - 20.15 The Australian Pink Floyd Show
- 16.30 - 18.00 Steve Vai
- 14.30 - 15.45 Thin Lizzy
- 13.00 - 14.00 Tesla

Open Airrow Rockstage:

- 17.30 - 19.00 Europe
- 16.00 - 17.00 Roger Hodgson
- 14.15 - 15.15 Outlaws

== 2008 ==
Sunday 15 June Goffertpark, Nijmegen

Rock Garden

- 20.45 - 22.45 Kiss
- 18.45 - 19.45 Whitesnake
- 16.45 - 17.45 Def Leppard
- 14.45 - 15.45 Journey
- 12.45 - 13.45 REO Speedwagon

Open Airrow Rock Stage

- 19.45 - 20.45 Motörhead
- 17.45 - 18.45 Twisted Sister
- 15.45 - 16.45 Kansas
- 13.45 - 14.45 Gotthard

3 Doors Down cancelled but was supposed to play open Arrow Rock Stage after Twisted Sister.
