= Music from "The Elder" =

Studio album by Kiss
- Released: November 10, 1981
- Recorded: March–September 1981
- Studios: Ace in the Hole Studios, Wilton, CT; A & R and Record Plant Studios, New York City; Sound Interchange, Toronto, Canada; Ezrin Farm, King City, Canada
- Genres: Progressive rock; hard rock
- Length: 42:46
- Label: Casablanca
- Producer: Bob Ezrin

Kiss chronology
Unmasked (1980)	Music from "The Elder" (1981)	Killers (1982)

Singles from Music from "The Elder"
- 1. "A World Without Heroes" Released: November 17, 1981; 2. "I" Released: November 17, 1981; 3. "The Oath" Released: January 25, 1982 (JP only)

Alternate cover
- Japan-only album-cover sheet with left side having the appearance of an obi strip.

Music from "The Elder" is the ninth studio album by American rock band Kiss, released on November 10, 1981 by Casablanca Records. The album marked a substantial departure from their previous output with the concept and orchestral elements. It was their first album with drummer Eric Carr, who adopted the persona of "The Fox", and the last with lead guitarist Ace Frehley until their 1996 reunion.

Due to poor sales, Kiss did not embark on a supporting tour for the first time in its eight-year history, opting instead to make a handful of promotional appearances. Outside of lead single "A World Without Heroes", later performed on the band's 1995 MTV Unplugged appearance, Kiss has avoided live performances of songs from the album following initial promotional appearances in 1981. On January 15, 1982, they performed "A World Without Heroes", "The Oath" and "I" on the TV show Fridays and on Dec 7, 1981, they lip-synced the song "I" for an episode of Solid Gold.

Critical reception was relatively kind on release, but the album proved to be a commercial failure and was, for a long time, unpopular with the involved parties, label, musicians and critics alike, even considering it to be one of the worst albums ever made. In recent years, the album has garnered some positive reappraisal, with some critics admitting the record has issues, but is still a concept album worthy of note.

== Background ==
Kiss was in the midst of a transitional phase as the 1980s began. Drummer Peter Criss was not involved in the recording of 1980's Unmasked and he officially left Kiss in May of the same year. His replacement Eric Carr was officially introduced in July. The group had recently embarked on a hugely successful tour of Australia and New Zealand— where the group's popularity was at its peak— in November, but the band's commercial fortunes at home were drastically reduced from the 1975–79 era.

Due to the lackluster sales of Unmasked, Kiss toured exclusively outside the US for the first time in their career, except for one concert at the Palladium Theatre in New York City. The overseas tours were well attended, partly because Kiss had rarely ventured abroad and because the more pop-oriented Dynasty and Unmasked albums did better in the European markets than Kiss's earlier hard rock albums.

This commercial downturn in the US is attributable to many factors, two of the biggest being the softening of Kiss' image in an effort to appeal to a broader fanbase and the softening of their music. Unmasked was a decidedly more pop-oriented effort than earlier albums and represented a sales drop-off of 65% from 1979's Dynasty. It also became the first Kiss album to fail to achieve platinum status since 1975's Dressed to Kill. The glut of Kiss merchandising that had cropped up in the late 1970s led to a backlash from many fans who felt that Kiss was more concerned with making money than with making good music.

== Recording ==
In an effort to return to their hard rock roots, Kiss began recording music more akin to the heavier style that launched them to popularity in the mid-1970s. The fall 1980 issue of the Kiss Army Newsletter hinted at the style the new album was to take: "It will be hard and heavy from start to finish, straight-on rock and roll that will knock your socks off."

At the same time, Gene Simmons, Paul Stanley and creative manager Bill Aucoin felt that just returning to a harder sound was not enough. They believed that only a bold, artistic statement would regenerate public interest in Kiss. To that end, they enlisted producer Bob Ezrin to work with the group. Ezrin had worked with the group before, producing the group's hit 1976 album Destroyer. He had also co-produced Pink Floyd's 1979 concept album The Wall. Simmons, Stanley and Aucoin felt that Ezrin could help bring their ambitions to fruition. The band and the producer decided to develop a full concept album from a fantasy short story conceived by Simmons, imagining it as a soundtrack for a blockbuster movie. According to Simmons, a movie deal was actually in the works and casting had begun, but the film ended up in development hell.

Recording sessions for the album commenced in March 1981 at Ace Frehley's home recording studio in Wilton, Connecticut and went on from May 11, 1981 at Ezrin's farmstead near Toronto, Canada. During the recording, Ezrin and Kiss worked in complete secrecy and no one other than them ever heard the album in progress. Ezrin, in particular, had insisted that he would only communicate with Kiss or Aucoin. Members from the American Symphony Orchestra and St. Robert's Choir arranged by Michael Kamen were employed to add an orchestral sound to the tracks.

Frehley did not accompany the band to the Canadian recording sessions and became increasingly frustrated, as he disagreed with the group's decision to abandon their original plan to record a straight rock album. Additionally, a number of guitar solos he recorded were not included in the final cut. Frehley resented what he felt was Simmons' and Stanley's domination of the recording sessions and was often outvoted 2–1 on band decisions after Criss' departure, as Carr was not a partner in Kiss as the other three members were, but rather an employee. This was the last album to feature Frehley until their 1996 reunion Alive/Worldwide Tour, apart from appearing on the cover of the compilation album Killers and the next album Creatures of the Night and a handful of promotional appearances with the band until late 1982.

== Composition ==
=== Story ===
The basic plot of "The Elder" involves the recruitment and training of a young hero (The Boy) by the Council of Elders who belong to the Order of the Rose, a mysterious group dedicated to combating evil. The Boy is guided by an elderly caretaker named Morpheus. The album's lyrics describe the boy's feelings during his journey and training, as he overcomes his early doubts to become confident and self-assured. The only spoken dialogue is at the end of the last track, "I". During the passage, Morpheus proclaims to the Elders that The Boy is ready to undertake his odyssey. "The Elder are a life-form without body", Simmons explained, "they are benevolent, but committed to the balance of opposites. And when darkness gets too strong, a hero is born to restore the balance." A number of narrative passages were cut from the final version of the album. These passages were meant to provide details of the story, and to act as transitional elements between songs.

=== Songs ===
The songs on Music from "The Elder" are a departure from the anthemic hard rock of the band's previous work, instead going for a heavy progressive rock sound. Despite this, some critics have described the album as hard rock and heavy metal, such as the opening track, "The Oath", written by Ezrin, Stanley and actor/songwriter Tony Powers. Many parts of the song feature Stanley singing in falsetto, a vocal technique he utilized on several of the album's tracks. "Dark Light", written by Frehley with Anton Fig, Simmons and Lou Reed, was based on a guitar riff composed by Fig. The song's original title was "Don't Run" and it's the only track Frehley sings on the album. The lone American single from the album, "A World Without Heroes" was originally a Stanley song entitled "Every Little Bit of Your Heart". The name was changed when it was decided to record Music from "The Elder" as a concept album. Lou Reed wrote the lyric "a world without heroes is like a world without sun". Simmons and Ezrin are also credited for the song." "Escape from the Island" is an instrumental, written and performed by Carr, Ezrin and Frehley, who recounted the recording of this song in a 2016 interview with The Pods & Sods Network.

Songs that were demoed but did not end up on the album include "Deadly Weapon" (Simmons recycled the title for a different song on Asylum), "Nowhere to Run" (re-recorded for Killers), "Feel Like Heaven" (covered by Peter Criss on Let Me Rock You), "Heaven" (became "Breakout" on Frehley's Comet and "Carr Jam 81" on Revenge), "It's My Life" (covered by Wendy O. Williams and later on The Box Set) and a few instrumentals, one confirmed to be titled "Silly Girl" and at least two known only by their bootleg names "The Difference Between Men and Boys" and "Council of the Elder". The original demos for "Deadly Weapon", "Feel Like Heaven" and "Nowhere to Run" were included on the 2022 deluxe re-release of Creatures of the Night.

== Artwork ==
The original vinyl release was a gatefold sleeve. This was the first Kiss album to feature no image of the group, not even the customary front-cover appearance. According to one story, the hand reaching for the door knocker is not that of Stanley: Aucoin has stated that it belongs to a hand model, hired for the shoot; however, in 2011 a photo surfaced from the album cover shoot showing a partially naked-faced Stanley with his hand on the door knocker. The door itself was long rumored to be located at the Park Ave United Methodist Church on Park Avenue, New York City, but was actually a prop created for the shoot. The photo session displayed a change of image: the costumes were more streamlined, especially when compared with the costumes for Unmasked, as were the hairstyles of Stanley and Simmons in particular.

== Release ==
The version of Music from "The Elder" released in the US, Europe and Brazil contained a different song order than the one originally intended. This order was chosen in order to emphasize "The Oath" and "A World Without Heroes" as potential singles, as the two songs started each side of the record. One effect of this alteration in song order was to disrupt the narrative flow of the album's story. "When the album came out, we were embarrassed", said Simmons.

The Japanese pressing of the album contained the intended song sequence, although "Escape from the Island" was excluded from the release and instead included as the B-side of "The Oath" single. This sequence was used (with the inclusion of "Escape from the Island") when Music from "The Elder" was re-released on CD in 1997. In a 2021 interview, band consultant Robert V. Conte discussed how the original sequence was restored. "When it came time to remaster The Elder, I contacted Gene asking for his thoughts about using that version for the CD," Conte recalls. "He was all for it but one track, 'Escape from the Island' was not on the imported version. Ay, caramba! We could not find any production notes in the PolyGram files about where it belonged on that particular sequence so, with The Demon's blessing, the track was added, the original sequence was restored, and the 1997 CD and cassette became the most complete versions of The Elder to date!"

== Promotion ==
Although budgets were prepared for a tour, none was undertaken. The only live public performance the band made in conjunction with the album was a January 15, 1982 appearance on the late-night variety show Fridays, where they performed live versions of "A World Without Heroes", "I" and "The Oath".

Kiss also made public appearances on television shows where they lip synced performances. Prior to the release of the album, on September 25, 1981, Kiss went to Mexico City on the national television show, Imevision, where they lip synced songs from the Dynasty album only, including “I Was Made for Lovin' You” and “Charisma”, as both songs were massive hits there. To promote the new album, they appeared on Solid Gold where they lip synced "I" and showed the promotional video of "A World Without Heroes", and a January 28 lip synced performance of "I" from Studio 54, broadcast via satellite to the Sanremo Festival in Italy. However, Frehley was absent for the Studio 54 appearance, so the group performed as a trio.

== Critical reception ==
Professional ratings
Review scores
Source	Rating
AllMusic	2/5 stars
Classic Rock	2.5/5 stars
Collector's Guide to Heavy Metal	5/10
Encyclopedia of Popular Music	3/5 stars
Pitchfork	0.0/10
Rolling Stone	2/5 stars
The Rolling Stone Album Guide	2/5 stars
Uncut	3/5 stars

Critical reception for Music from "The Elder" was relatively kind on release, but the album was a commercial failure and for a long time unpopular with the involved parties, label and musicians alike, as well as critics, even considering it to be one of the worst albums ever made. When Kiss premiered the album for their management and record company in October 1981, the reaction was a mixture of confusion and resentment. Business manager Howard Marks refused to allow his company's name to appear in the liner notes. Fan reaction was equally harsh, while critical reaction was comparatively positive. "A surprisingly good attempt by Kiss to edge forward…" wrote Fred Dellar in Hi-Fi News & Record Review. "The mix of familiar HM riffs and well-honed harmony vocals sometimes throw up images of Queen. Which is not at all a bad thing."

But while reviews like the one printed by Rolling Stone were kinder than past judgments, the album disappeared from the US chart by February 1982. Q ranked Music From "The Elder" 44th in their list of The 50 Worst Albums Ever. The same magazine ranked the album 6th in their list of 15 Albums Where Great Rock Acts Lost the Plot.

Most participants in the album subsequently said that it was a major misstep. Ezrin, despite his recent success with the even more ambitious The Wall, admitted that his judgments concerning Music from "The Elder" were clouded due in large part to a cocaine addiction at the time. Stanley and Simmons admit that they were "delusional" concerning the project, while Frehley stated that he felt that it was not a good idea to begin with.

=== Accolades ===
Despite the general negative feelings toward this album, it has garnered some occasional praise in recent years. In 2011, Spanish authors Alberto Díaz and Xavi Martínez included it in their book Concept albums: 150 essential releases. Also in 2011, the American website Guitar World mentioned the album among their 50 Great Albums Celebrating Their 30th Anniversary in 2011 while the Brazilian magazine Roadie Crew did likewise in a list of The 81 Greatest Albums of 1981. Roadie Crew would later, in 2017, rank it among their greatest 40 concept albums ever, at #22. In 2016, Classic Rock ranked the album among a list of The 20 Most Underrated Classic Rock Albums Ever, calling the album "anomalous" but stating that it "nonetheless has much to recommend it". In 2018, the French edition of the Rock Hard magazine included it in the Volume 2 of its "ideal metaltheque", in the concept albums category.

== Track listing ==
All credits adapted from the original releases.

Side one
No.	Title	Writer(s)	Lead vocals	Length
1.	"The Oath"	Paul Stanley, Bob Ezrin, Tony Powers	Stanley	4:33
2.	"Fanfare"	Stanley, Ezrin	instrumental	1:00
3.	"Just a Boy"	Stanley, Ezrin	Stanley	2:34
4.	"Dark Light"	Ace Frehley, Anton Fig, Lou Reed, Gene Simmons	Frehley	4:12
5.	"Only You"	Simmons	Simmons, Stanley	4:22
6.	"Under the Rose"	Eric Carr, Simmons	Simmons	4:48

Side two
No.	Title	Writer(s)	Lead vocals	Length
7.	"A World Without Heroes"	Stanley, Ezrin, Reed, Simmons	Simmons	2:39
8.	"Mr. Blackwell"	Simmons, Reed	Simmons	4:49
9.	"Escape from the Island"	Frehley, Carr, Ezrin	instrumental	2:51
10.	"Odyssey"	Powers	Stanley	5:49
11.	"I"	Simmons, Ezrin	Stanley, Simmons	3:54
12.	"Finale"	Stanley, Simmons, Frehley, Carr	instrumental	1:04

1997 Remastered Version
No.	Title	Writer(s)	Lead vocals	Length
1.	"Fanfare"	Stanley, Ezrin	instrumental	1:22
2.	"Just a Boy"	Stanley, Ezrin	Stanley	2:25
3.	"Odyssey"	Powers	Stanley	5:37
4.	"Only You"	Simmons	Simmons, Stanley	4:17
5.	"Under the Rose"	Carr, Simmons	Simmons	4:52
6.	"Dark Light"	Frehley, Fig, Reed, Simmons	Frehley	4:19
7.	"A World Without Heroes"	Stanley, Ezrin, Reed, Simmons	Simmons	2:41
8.	"The Oath"	Stanley, Ezrin, Powers	Stanley	4:32
9.	"Mr. Blackwell"	Simmons, Reed	Simmons	4:53
10.	"Escape from the Island"	Frehley, Carr, Ezrin	instrumental	2:52
11.	"I"	Simmons, Ezrin	Stanley, Simmons	5:04

== Personnel ==
Kiss

- Paul Stanley – vocals, rhythm guitar, all guitars on "The Oath", guitar solo on "Just a Boy" and "A World Without Heroes"
- Gene Simmons – vocals, bass, rhythm guitar on "Only You"
- Ace Frehley – vocals, lead guitar, bass on "Dark Light" and "The Oath" ^{[Better source needed]}.
- Eric Carr – drums, percussion, acoustic guitar and bass on "Under the Rose", backing vocals

Additional musicians

- Bob Ezrin – producer, keyboards, bass on "Escape from the Island", orchestral arrangements
- Allan Schwartzberg – drums on "Odyssey" and "I", additional overdub
- Tony Powers – keyboards on "Odyssey"
- The American Symphony Orchestra
- St. Robert's Choir
- Michael Kamen – orchestral arrangements

Production

- Brian Christian – associate producer, engineer
- Rick Hart, Robert Hrycyna, David Brown – engineers
- Rob Freeman, Corky Stasiak, Kevin Doyle – additional engineering
- Tom Laughlin – chief technician
- Ted Jensen – mastering engineer at Sterling Sound, New York

== Charts ==
Chart (1981)	Peak position
Australian Albums (Kent Music Report)	11
Austrian Albums (Ö3 Austria)	12
Dutch Albums (Album Top 100)	39
German Albums (Offizielle Top 100)	10
Italian Albums (Musica e Dischi)	23
Japanese Albums (Oricon)	21
Norwegian Albums (VG-lista)	7
Swedish Albums (Sverigetopplistan)	19
UK Albums (Official Charts)	51
US Billboard 200	75

Chart (2022)	Peak position
German Albums (Offizielle Top 100)	16
Scottish Albums (Official Charts)	75

== Certifications ==
Region	Certification	Certified units/sales
Australia (ARIA)	Gold	20,000^{^}
Norway (IFPI Norway)	Gold	50,000
^{^} Shipments figures based on certification alone.

== Releases ==
- Casablanca NBLP-7261 (November 16, 1981): LP
- Casablanca NBL5-7261 (November 16, 1981): US Cassette
- Casablanca NBL8-7261 (November 16, 1981): US 8-track
- PolyGram 824-153-2 (May 23, 1989): 1st US CD release
- Mercury 314 532 390-2 (October 7, 1997): Remastered CD
