= Firehouse (song) =

Song by Kiss

from the album Kiss
- Released: February 18, 1974
- Recorded: November 1973
- Genre: Hard rock
- Length: 3:18
- Label: Casablanca
- Songwriter: Paul Stanley
- Producers: Kenny Kerner, Richie Wise

Kiss track listing
- 10 tracks: 1. "Strutter"; 2. "Nothin' to Lose"; 3. "Firehouse"; 4. "Cold Gin"; 5. "Let Me Know"; 6. "Kissin' Time"; 7. "Deuce"; 8. "Love Theme from KISS"; 9. "100,000 Years"; 10. "Black Diamond"

"Firehouse" is a song by American rock band Kiss, released in 1974 on their eponymous debut album. During live performances, bassist Gene Simmons has breathed fire, with red lights flashing and sirens sounding. The track has remained a concert staple and is regarded as one of the band's classic songs. With its fan-favorite status, the song is one of the most played songs in the Kiss catalog, having been played over 1,000 times during their career.

== Background ==
Paul Stanley wrote the song while he attended the High School of Music & Art in New York City. He said he was inspired by British rock group the Move's song "Fire Brigade". The two tracks are similar in their choruses ("Get the fire brigade" and "Get the firehouse") and background sound effects. Kiss played the song during its early Wicked Lester period and often afterwards as well.

"Firehouse" was one of the first songs that Kiss performed during the band's earliest national TV appearances, including ABC's In Concert on February 19, 1974 (aired on March 29). The band also played the song on The Mike Douglas Show on April 29, 1974, a broadcast that included Simmons' first televised interview.

"Firehouse" is associated with Simmons' fire-breathing antics during concerts. One of many incidents occurred on December 31, 1973 at the Brooklyn Academy of Music in New York City, when the band was opening for Blue Öyster Cult. Simmons' hair caught fire for the first of many times.

In November 1972, Kiss, then performing as a Stanley-Simmons-Criss trio, played "Firehouse" along with "Strutter" and "Deuce" to Epic Records A&R director Don Ellis, intending to secure a record deal for the band. During the performance of "Firehouse", the band started ringing a bell. Stanley, enacting a fire-fighting scenario, then retrieved a red pail and threw it at an alarmed Ellis, who thought there was a real fire taking place. As Ellis was leaving, Peter Criss' drunk brother also vomited on his foot. Ellis later said that it was the worst performance he had ever heard.

== Live performances ==
"Firehouse" has remained a constant concert staple, with the band performing it on almost every tour to date. An incident occurred during the Kiss Alive/35 World Tour on November 9, 2009, in Winnipeg, when a concussion bomb caught fire after the performance of "Black Diamond". Soon after the fire started, Gene Simmons started to play the bassline for the song, with the whole band joining eventually. Eric Singer sang parts of the song, as the other members couldn't reach their microphones.

== Reception ==
In 2019, Classic Rock rated it Kiss' 20th best song, saying "Rudimentary but with an unmistakeable funk, it's Kiss at their most bare-boned."

== Appearances ==
"Firehouse" appears on following Kiss albums:

- Kiss - studio version
- Alive! - live version
- Double Platinum - remixed studio version
- You Wanted the Best, You Got the Best!! - Alive! version
- The Box Set - demo version

Covers

- Van Halen covered "Firehouse" along other Kiss' songs during their club days.
- Warrior Soul covered "Firehouse" on their covers album, Cocaine And Other Good Stuff, released in 2020.

== Personnel ==
Kiss

- Paul Stanley – lead vocals, rhythm guitar
- Gene Simmons – bass, backing vocals
- Peter Criss – drums
- Ace Frehley – lead guitar

Additional personnel

- Eddie Solon, Marc Labow, Richie Wise – fire engine sound effects

== See also ==
- 1974 in music
