= Black Diamond (Kiss song) =

Song by Kiss

from the album Kiss
- Released: February 18, 1974
- Recorded: November 1973
- Genre: Hard rock; heavy metal
- Length: 5:12
- Label: Casablanca
- Songwriter: Paul Stanley
- Producers: Kenny Kerner, Richie Wise

Kiss track listing
- 10 tracks: 1. "Strutter"; 2. "Nothin' to Lose"; 3. "Firehouse"; 4. "Cold Gin"; 5. "Let Me Know"; 6. "Kissin' Time"; 7. "Deuce"; 8. "Love Theme from KISS"; 9. "100,000 Years"; 10. "Black Diamond"

"Black Diamond" is a song by American hard rock band Kiss, written by rhythm guitarist Paul Stanley. "'Black Diamond' was written almost exactly as it is," he said, "except that the riff wasn't there; Gene [Simmons] brought that part in … It's all about arrangement and embellishment. That's what you're supposed to do in a band: come in and add something. But that doesn't mean you wrote the song." The lyrics focus on street prostitution. According to Stanley "Black Diamond was a song that I wrote about New York. New York was very dear to us, and life there was all we could write about. Seeing hookers on the street, whether we lived it, we saw it and it kind of gave us something to fantasize about.”

The song is the closing track on the band's eponymous first album, Kiss, released in 1974. It begins with an acoustic opening sung by Stanley before a furious riff enters, accompanied by Peter Criss on lead vocals. It ends with Ace Frehley's solo, then one chord repeated during a gradual slowing of the tape. The live version is usually sped up in tempo, combined with stage pyrotechnics and a rising drum platform.

In 2019, Classic Rock rated it Kiss' 13th best song. In 2014 Paste magazine rated it as Kiss' 4th best song, calling it "Kiss's one true epic [that] rules all the way through, from its delicate 12-string intro to its descending, apocalyptic finale." Paste also particularly praised Ace Frehley's dramatic guitar solo.

== Appearances ==
"Black Diamond" has appeared on the following Kiss albums:

- Kiss - studio version
- Alive! - live version
- The Originals - studio version
- Double Platinum - remixed & edited studio version
- The Box Set - studio version
- Kiss Symphony: Alive IV - live version
- Gold - studio version
- Kiss Alive! 1975–2000 - Alive! version + new live version
- Sonic Boom - new studio version

== Cover versions ==
- The Replacements did a version on their 1984 album Let It Be. A live recording from 1986 was featured on the 2017 album For Sale: Live at Maxwell's 1986.
- Yoshiki from the Japanese rock band X Japan created an arrangement of "Black Diamond" for a 72-piece orchestra on 1994's Kiss My Ass: Classic Kiss Regrooved tribute album.
- Black Diamond Brigade, a Norwegian American super group featuring Billy Gould of Faith No More and members of Satyricon, Euroboys, Ralph Myerz and the Jack Herren Band, and Amulet formed as a one-off project just to cover this song in 2003.

It was also covered by the Smashing Pumpkins and Pearl Jam.

== Personnel ==
- Peter Criss – lead vocals, drums
- Paul Stanley – rhythm guitar, backing vocals, intro lead vocals
- Ace Frehley – lead guitar, backing vocals
- Gene Simmons – bass, backing vocals

== Notes ==
1. Pearl Jam, retrieved (Feb. 16, 2008). Pearl Jam Set List, 8-2-2007 "Pearljam.com".
