= Kiss (Kiss album) =

Studio album by Kiss
- Released: February 8, 1974
- Recorded: November 10–16, 1973
- Studio: Bell Sound (New York City)
- Genres: Hard rock; glam rock; heavy metal
- Length: 35:07
- Label: Casablanca
- Producers: Kenny Kerner; Richie Wise

Kiss chronology
Kiss (1974)	Hotter Than Hell (1974)

Singles from Kiss
- 1. "Nothin' to Lose" Released: February 18, 1974; 2. "Kissin' Time" Released: May 10, 1974; 3. "Strutter" Released: August 10, 1974

Kiss is the debut studio album by American rock band Kiss, released on February 8, 1974, by Casablanca Records. Much of the material on the album was written by Gene Simmons and Paul Stanley, as members of their pre-Kiss band Wicked Lester. Simmons estimated that the entire process of recording and mixing took three weeks, while co-producer Richie Wise has stated it took just 13 days.

== Album information ==
The album was recorded at Bell Sound Studios in Midtown Manhattan, New York which was owned by the company that owned Buddah Records. Neil Bogart was an executive at Buddah before founding Casablanca Records, who held a party at the Century Plaza Hotel in Los Angeles to celebrate the West Coast release of Kiss (February 8) and to introduce the record company to the press and other record industry executives.

The original release of the album did not include "Kissin' Time". It has been on every pressing since May 10, 1974. There were approximately 100,000 copies of the original pressing without the song. The album's photoshoot took place on January 31, 1974, by Joel Brodsky at his studio on 57th Street in Manhattan. According to Paul Stanley, everybody except Peter Criss did their own makeup on the shoot. The makeup personnel did Criss's makeup, as Stanley described, like a "tribal lion mask".

In keeping with the Casablanca theme, the party included palm trees and a Humphrey Bogart lookalike. Kiss performed their usual loud and bombastic stage show, which turned Warner Bros. Records (Casablanca's record distributor) against the group. Soon after the show, Warner Bros. contacted Neil Bogart and threatened to end their deal if Kiss did not remove their makeup. With manager Bill Aucoin's backing, Kiss refused. Shortly after the album's release, Warner Bros. released Casablanca from its contract.

Kiss began their first album tour with a performance at the Northern Alberta Jubilee Auditorium in Edmonton, Alberta on February 5, 1974. A few weeks later, they made their first national TV appearance on ABC's In Concert (aired March 29, 1974), performing "Nothin to Lose", "Firehouse", and "Black Diamond", followed by a performance of "Firehouse" on The Mike Douglas Show (also aired March 29, 1974). During the interview portion of the show, Gene Simmons declared himself to be "evil incarnate", eliciting nervousness, confused reactions from the studio audience, to which comedian Totie Fields humorously commented, "Wouldn't it be funny if he's just a nice Jewish boy underneath the makeup?" Although neither confirming nor denying his Jewish heritage, Simmons replied, "You should only know", to which Fields countered, "I do. You can't hide the hook", referring to Simmons' nose.

The album's cover showed the group positioned against a black background in a pose visually reminiscent of the Beatles' With the Beatles album. Three of the four band members applied their own makeup for the album cover photo, as they usually did, but Criss's "Catman" makeup was applied by a professional, whose work came out looking quite a bit different from the look Criss had established, and to which he would return immediately afterward. Ace Frehley, wanting to impress the other members of Kiss, dyed his hair with silver hairspray, which easily came out with shampoo. According to Criss, photographer Joel Brodsky thought Kiss were literally clowns and wanted to place balloons behind the group for the shoot. Brodsky denied this, chalking it up to their imagination.

== Composition ==
All of the material for Kiss was written before the band entered the studio. Some of the songs were written during Wicked Lester's brief existence, while "Firehouse" was written by Paul Stanley while he was attending the High School of Music & Art in New York City.

"Strutter", which opens the album with a drum intro, is an uptempo rock song that was written before Frehley joined Kiss. Stanley wrote the lyrics, and the music was based on a song Simmons had written years before, "Stanley the Parrot", which he had recorded with former Wicked Lester member Brooke Ostrander in a New Jersey apartment. "Strutter" remains one of the few Kiss songs where Stanley and Simmons share songwriting credits and was a standard number at Kiss concerts throughout the 1970s. It was released in August 1974 as the third and final single from the album. "Nothin' to Lose" became the band's first single; it was written by Simmons. Verses were performed by Simmons and Stanley, with Peter Criss providing scat vocals for the chorus. It chronicles the singer coercing his girlfriend into trying anal sex, and her subsequent enjoyment of it. The B-side was "Love Theme from KISS", the album's instrumental.

Simmons performed fire-breathing during "Firehouse" at live concerts. "Cold Gin" was the first song Frehley composed for the band, he was insecure in his singing ability, so he turned over the vocals to Simmons. "Cold Gin" was a concert staple throughout the 1970s. Frehley assisted on lead vocals during the Alive/Worldwide Tour. The song refers to the stimulating effect that cold gin supposedly has on the male sex drive, crediting the drink as the only thing keeping a couple together in a troubled relationship. "Let Me Know" (previously titled "Sunday Driver") was the song Stanley played when he was first introduced to Simmons, and it was later recorded by Wicked Lester. Simmons and Stanley shared lead vocal duties on the song, which was given a bridge and instrumental coda when recorded for Kiss. During later Kiss concerts, this coda was moved to the end of "She" and before that, "Watchin' You". The song has been classified as bubblegum pop.

"Kissin' Time" was not included on the original album; it was not recorded until two months after its February release. By April, the album was clearly not the commercial success that the band and Casablanca Records founder Bogart were hoping for. Bogart (who knew that a catchy single could save the album) ordered Kiss back into the studio to record "Kissin' Time", which was a Top 20 hit for Bobby Rydell in 1959. It was released as a single on May 10, but never reached any higher than No. 83. It did, however, boost sales of the album, even though it was not added to the track listing until the album was reissued in July 1974, against the band's wishes; despite this, "Kissin' Time" has appeared on almost all subsequent reissues of the album.

"Deuce" has been a staple of the band's concerts, opening their shows from 1973 to 1976 and again for their 1996 reunion. Simmons has said that he does not know the meaning of the lyrics. "Love Theme from Kiss" is an instrumental that evolved from a song titled "Acrobat", played during the band's 1973 club shows. It can be found on their 2001 box set. The song is shortened for the album. It is the only Kiss song to feature songwriting credits for all four original members. "Love Theme from Kiss" appeared in the 2010 movie Somewhere, directed by Sofia Coppola.

"100,000 Years" begins with a bass riff by Simmons. The live version includes a long drum solo by Criss continuing from the short one found on the album, as heard on Alive!. The lyrics are about a voyager returning from a time travel trip. The demo version can be heard on the 2001 release of the Kiss box set. "Black Diamond" begins with Stanley singing the intro, accompanied by a twelve-string acoustic guitar. After he yells out "hit it!", the full band kicks in and Criss assumes lead vocal duties for the two verses. After the last chorus, the song transitions to 6/8 time for Frehley's guitar solo, then ends with repeated 'A' chords as the tape is gradually slowed during mixing. After Criss departed from the band, the vocal duties fell to subsequent drummers Eric Carr and Eric Singer.

== Later re-pressings ==
In the mid-late 1980s, the album was reissued by Mercury Records on vinyl and cassette with a live version of "Nothin' to Lose" (from Alive!) in place of the studio version. This substitution was reportedly done unauthorized by a malicious employee at PolyGram Records' tape library. The studio version was restored when the album was issued on CD and the 2014 vinyl reissue.

== Reception ==
Professional ratings
Review scores
Source	Rating
AllMusic	4.5/5 stars
Collector's Guide to Heavy Metal	7/10
The Encyclopedia of Popular Music	3/5 stars
Pitchfork	8.0/10
The New Rolling Stone Album Guide	2/5 stars
Spin Alternative Record Guide	6/10
Uncut	5/5 stars

Kiss sold approximately 75,000 copies after its initial release; which is par for a debut album, though considered low for an album supported with promoting and touring. Casablanca Records boss Neil Bogart had the band record "Kissing Time" as a single, which was then added to later pressings, but the album still did not take off. By June 8, 1977, three years after release, it was certified gold, having shipped 500,000 copies. The album was re-released in 1997 (along with most of Kiss' earlier albums) in a remastered version.

In 2003, Kiss was included in the Spin list of essential glam rock albums. In 2024, Loudwire staff elected it as the best hard rock album of 1974.

== Track listing ==
All credits are adapted from the original release.

Side one
No.	Title	Writer(s)	Lead vocals	Length
1.	"Strutter"	Paul Stanley, Gene Simmons	Stanley	3:10
2.	"Nothin' to Lose"	Simmons	Simmons, Peter Criss, Stanley	3:26
3.	"Firehouse"	Stanley	Stanley	3:18
4.	"Cold Gin"	Ace Frehley	Simmons	4:21
5.	"Let Me Know"	Stanley	Simmons, Stanley	2:58

Side two
No.	Title	Writer(s)	Lead vocals	Length
1.	"Kissin' Time"	Kal Mann, Bernie Lowe	Simmons, Stanley, Criss	3:52
2.	"Deuce"	Simmons	Simmons	3:05
3.	"Love Theme from Kiss"	Stanley, Simmons, Criss, Frehley	instrumental	2:24
4.	"100,000 Years"	Stanley, Simmons	Stanley	3:22
5.	"Black Diamond"	Stanley	Criss, intro by Stanley	5:11

== Personnel ==
Kiss

- Paul Stanley (Starchild) – rhythm guitar, vocals
- Gene Simmons (Demon) – bass, vocals
- Peter Criss (Catman) – drums, vocals
- Ace Frehley (Space Ace) – lead guitar, backing vocals on "Nothin' to Lose" and "Black Diamond"

Additional personnel

- Bruce Foster – piano
- Bobby – handclaps on "Nothin' to Lose"
- Eddie Solon, Marc Labow, Richie Wise – fire engine on "Firehouse"

Production

- Kenny Kerner, Richie Wise – producers
- Warren Dewey – engineer
- Joe Brescio – mastering
- Robert Lockart – art director, design
- Joel Brodsky – photography

== Charts ==
Chart (1974–76)	Peak position
Canada Top Albums/CDs (RPM)	82
Japanese Albums (Oricon)	54
New Zealand Albums (RMNZ)	38
US Billboard 200	87

== Certifications ==
Region	Certification	Certified units/sales
Canada (Music Canada)	Gold	50,000^{^}
United States (RIAA)	Gold	500,000^{^}
^{^} Shipments figures based on certification alone.
