= A World Without Heroes =

Single by Kiss

from the album Music from "The Elder"
- Released: 1981
- Recorded: 1981
- Studio: Ace in the Hole, A&R Studios, & Record Plant, New York City
- Genre: Soft rock; progressive rock
- Length: 2:39
- Label: Casablanca (NB-2343)
- Songwriters: Gene Simmons; Paul Stanley; Lou Reed; Bob Ezrin
- Producer: Bob Ezrin

Kiss singles chronology
"What Makes The World Go 'Round" (1980)	"A World Without Heroes" (1981)	"I" (1981)

"A World Without Heroes" is a song by the American hard rock band Kiss. It is credited as being written by Gene Simmons, Paul Stanley, Lou Reed and Bob Ezrin, and was originally recorded and released on their 1981 album Music from "The Elder".

Kiss performing "A World Without Heroes" in their 1981 video. Left to right: Gene Simmons, Eric Carr (on drums), Paul Stanley and Ace Frehley.

== Background ==
Originally titled "Every Little Bit of Your Heart", the lyrics were changed in order to fit the concept of the album, and Lou Reed contributed the line "A world without heroes, is like a world without sun" to the lyrics.

The song is a slow ballad which features Simmons on lead vocals and Stanley notably performing the guitar solo. It was released as the first single from The Elder album and reached No. 56 in the U.S. and No. 55 in the UK.

A video was made to help promote the single. It is the first to feature Eric Carr, and was the first Kiss video to be played on MTV.

Despite the video and chart performance of the single, Kiss only played it live once during their appearance on the "Fridays" TV show and did not play the song live again until fan request at Kiss conventions in 1995 led them to performing an acoustic version on their Kiss Unplugged performance and subsequent album.

== Charts ==
Chart (1981–1982)	Peak position
UK Singles (OCC)	55
US Billboard Hot 100	56
