= I (Kiss song) =

Single by Kiss

from the album Music from "The Elder"
- B-side: "The Oath"
- Released: November 17, 1981
- Recorded: 1981
- Genre: Progressive rock; hard rock
- Length: 3:54
- Label: Casablanca
- Songwriters: Bob Ezrin, Gene Simmons
- Producer: Bob Ezrin

Kiss singles chronology
"A World Without Heroes" (1981)	"I" (1981)	"Killer" / "I Love It Loud" (1982)

"I" is a song by the American rock band Kiss from their 1981 studio album Music from “The Elder”. It was released as the album's second single.

== Background and writing ==
"I" is the 11th and last track on the Kiss 1981 studio album Music from “The Elder”.

The song was written by Bob Ezrin and Gene Simmons and produced by Bob Ezrin.

== Recording ==
According to the Encyclopedia of Kiss, "Eric Carr couldn't quite capture the feel" of the track, so his drums were overdubbed by Allan Schwartzberg. The vocals are performed by Gene Simmons and Paul Stanley, exchanging verses.

== Musical style and lyrical theme ==
Brett Weiss's Encyclopedia of Kiss characterizes the song as "celebratory, fist-pumping, foot-stomping". The protagonist of the song, "despite initial misgivings, believes that he can emerge triumphant".

== Music video ==
Kiss has a "forgotten" music video of this song on YouTube.

== Personnel ==
- Paul Stanley – lead vocals, rhythm guitar
- Gene Simmons – lead vocals, bass guitar
- Ace Frehley – lead guitar, backing vocals
- Eric Carr – percussion, backing vocals
- Bob Ezrin – percussion
- Allan Schwartzberg – drums

== Commercial performance ==
The song reached No. 62 in Germany and No. 48 in the Netherlands.

== Charts ==
Chart (1981–1982)	Peak position
Australian Singles (Kent Music Report)	44
Netherlands (Single Top 100)	48
West Germany (GfK)	62
