= Plaeto =

Dutch rock band

- Origin: Netherlands
- Genres: Rock
- Years active: 2002–present
- Labels: Red Bullet/Sonic Ranger Music
- Members: Sandro van Breemen; Jos Verhijen; Joska Ligtenberg; Jeroen Polderman
- Past members: Erwin Steijlen; Han Dasselaar
- Website: plaeto.nl

Plaeto is a Dutch rock band, formed in 2002 by ex City-to-City's Alexander (Sandro) van Breemen (vocals and guitar & compositions). The band was signed to Red Bullet for the release of their debut album All That Scares You. The band's first single, "Being Me," did well in their home country. Plaeto was awarded "most promising band" in 2004 by Dutch radio station 3FM.

Their 2009 follow-up, Breathing New Air, featured quite a different style of music but was popular with fans.

== Members ==
=== Current members ===
- Alexander (Sandro) van Breemen – lead vocals, lead guitar
- Jos Verhijen (2004–present) – bass guitar, backing vocals
- Joska Ligtenberg – lead guitar, backing vocals
- Jeroen Polderman – drums, percussion, backing vocals

=== Former members ===
- Erwin Steijlen (2002–2004) – rhythm guitar

== Discography ==
=== Studio albums ===
Year	Title
2004	All That Scares You
2009	Breathing New Air

=== Singles ===
Year	Title	Album
2004	"Being Me"	All That Scares You
