= Nothin' to Lose (Kiss song) =

Single by Kiss

from the album Kiss
- B-side: "Love Theme from KISS"
- Released: February 8, 1974
- Recorded: 1973
- Studio: Bell Sound (New York City)
- Genre: Hard rock
- Length: 3:26
- Label: Casablanca/Warner Bros.
- Songwriter: Gene Simmons
- Producers: Kenny Kerner and Richie Wise

Kiss singles chronology
"Nothin' to Lose" (1974)	"Kissin' Time" (1974)

Kiss track listing
- 10 tracks: 1. "Strutter"; 2. "Nothin' to Lose"; 3. "Firehouse"; 4. "Cold Gin"; 5. "Let Me Know"; 6. "Kissin' Time"; 7. "Deuce"; 8. "Love Theme from KISS"; 9. "100,000 Years"; 10. "Black Diamond"

Audio
- "Nothin' to Lose on YouTube

"Nothin' to Lose" is the debut single by American rock band Kiss, released on their self-titled debut album in 1974. It was the lead single off the album, with "Love Theme from KISS" as the B-side. Although the song failed to chart, it has remained a concert staple during the 1970s and was featured on many live albums and compilations.

== Background ==
Gene Simmons, the sole writer of the song, admitted that the song's lyrics chronicled the singer coercing his girlfriend into trying anal sex, and her subsequent enjoyment of it. Gene Simmons, Paul Stanley, and Peter Criss share the lead vocals on the song.

The song was the first Kiss song to feature an extra player, as Bruce Foster played piano on the track. His contribution was noted on the sleeve of the album. "Nothin' to Lose" was one of the first songs Kiss performed on their first national appearances, on ABC's In Concert on February 19 (the show aired on March 29). Other songs performed on the show were "Firehouse" and "Black Diamond".

== Reception ==
Cash Box said that "one of the finest, new heavy metal bands to come out of New York City in some time debuts here (with Kerner-Wise at the controls) with a very heavy, very tasty rocker reminiscent of Deep Purple, yet able to stand freely alone on its own merits." Record World called it a "hard rocker par excellence" with "big gutsy vocals and heavy instrumentals." AllMusic noted it as "a good example of the band's skill for mixing hard rock riffs with good-time pop hooks."

== Live performances ==
"Nothin' to Lose" was played often during the 1970s and featured on Kiss's breakthrough album Alive! but largely ignored during the 1980s. The band performed the song at the Kiss Convention (one time with Peter Criss) and MTV Unplugged, and during the Psycho Circus show in Los Angeles in the 1990s.

== Appearances ==
"Nothin' to Lose" has appeared on the following Kiss albums:

- Kiss - studio version
- Alive! - live version
- The Originals - studio version
- Kiss Unplugged - live version
- The Box Set - studio version and the Unplugged version
- Gold - studio version
- Kiss Chronicles: 3 Classic Albums - studio version
- Kiss Alive! 1975–2000 - Alive! version
- Kiss Alive 35 - live version

Other appearances:

- B-side of the "Kissin' Time" single
- B-side of the "Shout It Out Loud" live single

== Track listing ==
7" Single
No.	Title	Writer(s)	Length
1.	"Nothing' to Lose"	Gene Simmons	3:26
2.	"Love Theme from Kiss"	Simmons, Paul Stanley, Ace Frehley, Peter Criss	2:24
Total length:			5:50

7" EP
No.	Title	Writer(s)	Length
1.	"Nothin' to Lose"	Simmons	3:26
2.	"Kissin' Time"	Bernie Low, Kal Mann	3:52
3.	"Strutter"	Simmons, Stanley	3:10
4.	"Deuce"	Simmons	3:05
Total length:			13:33

== Personnel ==
Kiss

- Gene Simmons – bass, lead vocals
- Peter Criss – drums, lead vocals
- Paul Stanley – rhythm guitar, lead vocals
- Ace Frehley – lead guitar, backing vocals

Additional personnel

- Bruce Foster – piano
- Bobby – handclaps
