= She (Kiss song) =

Song by Kiss

from the album Dressed to Kill
- Released: March 19, 1975
- Recorded: February 1975
- Studio: Electric Lady Studios, New York City
- Genre: Hard rock
- Length: 4:08
- Label: Casablanca
- Songwriters: Gene Simmons; Stephen Coronel
- Producers: Neil Bogart & Kiss

"She" is a song by the American hard rock group Kiss. It was released in 1975 on the band's third studio album, Dressed to Kill. The song was written by Gene Simmons and Stephen Coronel while Simmons was in a band called Bullfrog Bheer. Although it was first released in 1975, Kiss had performed "She" on previous tours. It was removed from the set list during the 1980s and 1990s.

== Background ==
Coronel was the originator of the song, with Simmons contributing the words and lyrics during an evening rehearsal with Wicked Lester. The song was originally called "She Walks by Moonlight", after a line in the film Hondo where, as Simmons said:

'I want your daughter.' [The chief said:] 'You may not have my daughter.' [The cowboy said:] 'Why not?' [The chief said:] 'She walks by moonlight.' And that's the first line of the song. I didn't even know what it meant, I just loved the sound of it.

The Wicked Lester version of the song is 3:07 in length, while the later Dressed to Kill version is 4:08 long and the original line "she's no good" was changed to "she's so good". Also, the Kiss version lacked the original's congas (played by session musician Jimmy Maelen) and flute.

Ace Frehley's solo in the song was based on Robby Krieger's solo in The Doors' song "Five to One", starting in the same key and tempo. It was also self-admittedly "copied" by Mike McCready of Pearl Jam on that band's song "Alive".

"She" is one of only three Kiss songs taken from the Wicked Lester era, with the others being the Hotter Than Hell's "Goin' Blind" and Dressed to Kill's "Love Her All I Can". "She" and "Love Her All I Can" were intended for inclusion on the Hotter Than Hell album, but the band already had enough material for the album.

== Live performances ==
Although not released officially until 1975, Kiss played "She" on previous tours. Wicked Lester also performed the song. Following the 1975 Alive! Tour, "She" was dropped and was not performed during the 1980s and the 1990s. The band did play the song occasionally during the 1994–1995 shows and on Halloween night in 1998 at Dodger Stadium. The band returned the song to the setlist for the Rock the Nation Tour in 2004. It was performed again during the 2008–2009 Alive 35 World Tour.

Allmusic critic Fred Thomas felt that the live version of "She" on Alive! was "just as good" as the hit single "Rock & Roll All Nite".

== Appearances ==
"She" appears on following Kiss albums:

- Dressed to Kill – studio version
- Alive! – live version
- The Originals – studio version
- Double Platinum – studio version with "Rock Bottom" intro
- The Box Set – Wicked Lester version
- Gold – studio version
- Kiss Chronicles: 3 Classic Albums – studio version
- Kiss Alive! 1975–2000 – Alive! version

== Covers ==
- S.G.M. covered the song in 1988.
- Anthrax's cover appears on the first official Kiss tribute album Kiss My Ass: Classic Kiss Regrooved, released in 1994. This version was more similar to the Alive! version of the song than to the studio take, as on the Alive! version, Kiss played the coda of "Let Me Know", just as Anthrax did on the cover.
- Unmasked's cover is featured on the Norwegian 2005 Kiss tribute album Gods of Thunder: A Norwegian Tribute to Kiss.
- Snowblynd's version appears on the Lick It Up – A Millennium Tribute to Kiss 2008 tribute album.
- Former Wicked Lester lead guitarist Ron Leejack covered "She" on his two-track demo tape Wicked
- Still Wicked, a project consisting of Leejack and Ace Frehley's friend Gordon Gebert, covered the song on the band's 1998 EP Something Wicked This Way Comes
- Ace Frehley covered the song on his 2020 covers album, Origins Vol. 2.

== Personnel ==
Wicked Lester version

- Gene Simmons - bass guitar, lead vocals
- Paul Stanley - rhythm guitar, lead vocals
- Tony Zarrella – drums
- Ron Leejack – lead guitar
- Brooke Ostrander – keyboards

Kiss version

- Gene Simmons - bass guitar, lead vocals
- Paul Stanley - rhythm guitar, lead vocals
- Peter Criss - drums, backing vocals
- Ace Frehley - lead guitar
