= Wicked Lester =

American rock band (1970–1973)

- Wicked Lester (c. 1972), left to right: Ron Leejack, Gene Simmons, Paul Stanley, Brooke Ostrander, and Tony Zarrella

Background information
- Also known as: Rainbow (1970–1971)
- Origin: New York City, U.S.
- Genres: Rock and roll; folk rock; pop
- Years active: 1970–1973
- Label: Epic
- Spinoffs: Kiss
- Past members: Paul Stanley; Gene Simmons; Brooke Ostrander; Stephen Coronel; Joe Davidson; Tony Zarrella; Ron Leejack

Wicked Lester was a rock band based in New York City, formed in 1970 and active through 1972. They signed to Epic Records but found little success, and are known as the predecessor of Kiss who became one of the best-selling musical acts in history. In contrast to the hard rock sound of Kiss, Wicked Lester's music featured elements of rock and roll, folk rock and pop.

Wicked Lester originally used the name Rainbow but soon changed to Wicked Lester to avoid confusion with another band. The core members were bassist Chaim Witz (as "Gene Klein") and rhythm guitarist Stanley Eisen. Witz and Eisen, feeling that the band's failure was a result of its lack of vision and direction, decided to found a new band. They changed their stage names to Gene Simmons and Paul Stanley, respectively, auditioned a new drummer and lead guitarist, and formed Kiss band by early January 1973.

Although Kiss achieved massive international success, Wicked Lester's album recorded for Epic has never been officially released in its entirety. The sessions have been released in bootleg form as The Original Wicked Lester Sessions. Kiss officially released three tracks from these sessions on their 2001 Box Set release.

== History ==
=== Rainbow ===
The origins of the band trace to 1969, when keyboardist Brooke Ostrander joined bassist Klein and lead guitarist Stephen Coronel who had played together since 1964 in bands like The Long Island Sounds, Bullfrog Bheer, the Love Bag, and Coffee. In August 1970, Coronel recommended rhythm guitarist Stanley Eisen from his 1970 band The Tree, who had actually been rejected by the group after a previous audition. Shortly after Eisen joined, the band started using the name Rainbow and when Ostrander recruited drummer Joe Davidson, the first Rainbow lineup was completed. Davidson's stay did not last long and he was replaced by drummer Tony Zarrella, another friend of Ostrander's.

In early 1971, Rainbow played their first concert, which consisted of two sets performed at Richmond Community College in Staten Island. Klein had attended this school, and graduated with a BA in Education degree. in 1970 After the show, the group discovered that there was already another band called Rainbow. They decided to drop the name, and came up with the name Wicked Lester, which Klein liked because it was unusual. While the decision to change the group's name came partly out of a desire to avoid any potential legal issues, it also reflected Klein and Eisen's desire to start playing more original compositions.

=== Crossroads ===
During their brief existence, Wicked Lester performed in public twice. The first show took place at the Rivoli Theatre in South Fallsburg, New York on April 23, 1971. The second, in late summer 1971, was at an Atlantic City, New Jersey hotel hosting a B'nai B'rith Youth Organization event. Not long after that show, the band suffered a major setback when all their musical gear was stolen. On August 7, 1971 Wicked Lester recorded an acoustic demo tape of 20 songs with the line-up of Klein, Eisen and Coronel. The tape included songs going back to earlier bands Bullfrog Bheer and Rainbow, many that would end up on Wicked Lester's unreleased album in full band versions, and a few that with some re-working made it to future Kiss albums.

After a chance meeting with Electric Lady Studios engineer Ron Johnsen who was introduced to the band via Eisen's friend and former bandmate Neal Teeman who worked at the same studio, Wicked Lester was given the opportunity to record some demos in November 1971. Johnsen, who produced the demo tape, shopped it to a few labels, with no success. Eventually the tape was screened by Epic Records, who purchased the masters and agreed to fund the recording of a full album. One of the conditions, however, was that Stephen Coronel be fired and replaced with a better guitarist.

Coronel was replaced by session musician Ron Leejack (Ronald Jackowski, ex-Cactus) on December 15th, 1971, and the group continued their efforts to finish the album. Some songs were completely re-recorded to accommodate Leejack's different playing style. The entire recording process, which followed a haphazard schedule, took nearly a year to complete. When the completed album was presented to Don Ellis, Epic's A&R director, in August 1972, he stated that he hated the album and was not going to release it. The next day, Wicked Lester manager Lew Linet requested and received the group's release from Epic Records.

=== Kiss ===
At this time, Klein and Eisen, now using the stage names Gene Simmons and Paul Stanley as evidenced by the line-up on a studio tape from October 5th, 1972, decided that one of the reasons for Wicked Lester's lack of success was their lack of a singular image and musical vision. They made the decision to move forward and start a new band. Leejack says Stanley and Simmons asked him to fire Zarrella and Ostrander. After completion, Brooke Ostrander, feeling that the band was going nowhere, quit the band in November 1972. He went on to teach music at Missisquoi Valley Union High School in Swanton, Vermont. Ostrander died on September 3, 2011, from cancer. Tony Zarrella claims he stayed with the band until "Gene Simmons and Paul Stanley left the band" and afterwards recorded and toured with NYC based groups "Dreams In Color" and "Myth".

For a short time, Ron Leejack continued on with the new version of Wicked Lester, which began auditioning for a drummer. Leejack officially resigned on January 15th 1973, only 2 weeks before the first Kiss show with Criss and Frehley but he may not have been active in the band since late 1972 as he also claims to have toured as the last guitarist of The Rascals that same year.

Whereas Wicked Lester's original sound was rooted in varied musical styles, including folk and pop, when Simmons and Stanley decided to recruit new members, they made the decision to focus on a more aggressive and simple style of rock and roll. The first new member they added was drummer Peter Criss, who had placed an ad in Rolling Stone, in late August or early September 1972. The ad stated, "EXPD. ROCK & roll drummer looking for orig. grp. doing soft & hard music. Peter, Brooklyn." The new Wicked Lester, without a recording contract, began a strict and regular regimen of rehearsals.

In November 1972, the reimagined group (now a trio featuring Simmons, Stanley and Criss) arranged a showcase with Don Ellis, the Epic Records executive who earlier had rejected Wicked Lester's album. While one Epic executive, Tom Werman, was impressed by the power and theatrics of this new incarnation of Wicked Lester, Ellis once again turned them down. As Ellis was leaving, Peter Criss's brother, who was drunk, vomited on his foot.

In early December, Paul Stanley placed an ad in The Village Voice stating, "LEAD GUITARIST WANTED with Flash and Ability. Album Out Shortly. No time wasters please." The ad ran for two issues, December 7 and 14, 1972, leading to several audition sessions including one John Segall who later found fame as Jay Jay French in Twisted Sister. One audition was by Paul "Ace" Frehley who showed up wearing different-colored shoes, walked into the room without saying a word, hooked up his guitar and started playing. Frehley was asked back for a second audition and was a member of the band by Christmas 1972 or according to other sources on January 3, 1973. Within a few weeks, the group changed its name to Kiss and played their first concert on January 30, 1973.

== Unreleased album ==
"Keep Me Waiting"
The horn section heard in this clip is an example of the musical elements Wicked Lester's unreleased album featured. This song was released as part of Kiss's Box Set in 2001.

The recording of Wicked Lester's album, which began in November 1971 at Electric Lady Studios in Greenwich Village, took place over multiple sessions and was finished in July 1972. The album was a mixture of original material and covers, showcasing the group's eclectic style. Three of the songs recorded for the Wicked Lester album would later resurface as Kiss songs, with varying degrees of similarity. Various versions and mixes have made it to bootleg circles, some with Coronel not credited which indicates that Leejack eventually replaced all his guitar parts.

The chorus of their cover version of The Hollies' "I Wanna Shout" would serve as the inspiration for "Shout It Out Loud" from 1976's Destroyer, although the two songs otherwise bear little similarity. Two of the tracks, "Love Her All I Can", written by Paul Stanley, and "She", written by Simmons and Steve Coronel would resurface on 1975's Dressed to Kill. "Love Her All I Can" featured similar arrangements in both versions while the Kiss version of "She" lacked the congas and flute of the original.

The only part of Wicked Lester's album to initially be released was the cover art, which was used for The Laughing Dogs' self-titled debut album in 1979. CBS Records, which owned the rights to the album, remixed it and planned to release it in late 1976 to capitalize on Kiss's popularity at the time. Kiss and Neil Bogart, the president of their label, Casablanca Records, purchased the master tapes from CBS for $137,500 and never released it. The label and band feared that if CBS released the tracks it would diminish their commercial appeal. The band worried that their hard rock image would be damaged by these more eclectic recordings. It was also feared that the release would be accompanied by pictures of Simmons and Stanley without their trademark makeup; Kiss had yet to officially unmask themselves at the time. In later years the album surfaced as a bootleg titled The Original Wicked Lester Sessions. The band bought Bogart's share and eventually released three of the tracks, "Keep Me Waiting," "She," and "Love Her All I Can", in 2001 as part of a five-disc box set.

=== Track listing ===
1. "Love Her All I Can" (2:28) Stanley
2. "Sweet Ophelia" (2:56) Barry Mann/Gerry Goffin
3. "Keep Me Waiting" (3:04) Stanley
4. "Simple Type" (2:33) Simmons
5. "She" (2:54) Coronel/Simmons
6. "Too Many Mondays" (3:27) Barry Mann/Cynthia Weil
7. "What Happens in the Darkness" (2:59) Tamy Lester Smith
8. "When the Bell Rings" (3:11) Austin Roberts/Christopher Welch
9. "Molly" (aka "Some Other Guy") (2:23) Stanley
10. "We Want to Shout It Out Loud" (2:04) The Hollies

The band also recorded a Paul Stanley song called "Long, Long Road" that might have made it onto the album.

== Members ==
- Paul Stanley – rhythm guitar, vocals (1970–1973)
- Gene Simmons – bass, vocals (1970–1973)
- Brooke Ostrander – keyboards (1970–1972; died 2011)
- Stephen Coronel – lead guitar (1970–1971)
- Joe Davidson – drums (1970)
- Tony Zarrella – drums & percussion (1970–1972)
- Ron Leejack – lead guitar (1971–1972)

== See also ==
- Chelsea, another pre-Kiss band, featuring Kiss drummer Peter Criss
