= Deuce (song) =

Song by Kiss

from the album Kiss
- Released: February 8, 1974
- Recorded: October–November 1973
- Studio: Bell Sound (New York City)
- Genre: Hard rock
- Length: 3:08
- Label: Casablanca
- Songwriter: Gene Simmons
- Producers: Kenny Kerner; Richie Wise

"Deuce" is a song by the American hard rock band Kiss, written by bassist and vocalist Gene Simmons. The song appeared on Kiss' eponymous 1974 debut album. In addition to being one of the band's most popular and most-covered songs, "Deuce" is a traditional concert opener. The song has appeared on many Kiss live and compilation albums.

== Background ==
Simmons wrote "Deuce" in the winter of 1972 as the band was transitioning from Wicked Lester to Kiss. Simmons said that "'Deuce' was written in my head on a bus. I heard the lick, the riff, the melody, the whole thing. We arranged it right on the spot and knew that it would be a staple for years." According Simmons, he simply copied the bassline of the Rolling Stones' "Bitch" and played it more or less backwards. "I wrote 'Deuce' on the bass," he said, "so the guitars ended up shadowing the bass line or variations of it in different octaves".

The entire song was written nearly linearly; the riff came first, then the bridge, then finally the chorus. While uncredited, Paul Stanley provided the lightly phased intro riff, inspired by the Raspberries' "Go All the Way". "It's an integral part of the song," he observed, "but should I get credit for that? I don't think so".

"Deuce" also has special significance for Ace Frehley, as it was the first song he ever played with Kiss. "When I auditioned for Kiss", recalled Frehley, "they said, 'We're going to play a song for you to listen to, and then try playing along — it's in the key of 'A'. They played ["Deuce"] as a three-piece. I thought, 'That's easy enough,' so I got up and wailed for four minutes playing lead work over it". Frehley has also stated that "Deuce" is his favorite Kiss song.

Lyrics include lines such as "Get up and get your grandma out of here" and "You know your man is working hard, he's worth a deuce", whose meaning Simmons has stated he is unsure of. Simmons stated in reference to the song: "Lyrically, I had no idea what I was talking about. Sometimes stuff means a lot, sometimes it means nothing."

On July 28, 2009, a live version of "Deuce" was released (along with live versions of "100,000 Years" and "Parasite") in the Kiss 01 track pack for Rock Band 2.

== Live performances ==
The song was performed during the first Kiss tours, mostly as the opener. It was dropped from the setlist for the Rock and Roll Over Tour and was not performed regularly in the US until the Hot in the Shade Tour in 1990. After 1976, it was not played again until a show in Evansville, Indiana, in January 1978. It was played in some one-off shows in the US in 1988 as well as the European Crazy Nights Tour in 1988. Simmons has said that during the band's first tours, after they did the usual setlist and encore, they did not have any more songs to play so they played "Deuce" again.

== Reception ==
"Deuce" is widely considered one of Kiss's best songs. In 2014, Paste ranked the song number one on their list of the 20 greatest Kiss songs, and in 2019, Louder Sound ranked the song number two on their list of the 40 greatest Kiss songs. Allmusic critic Greg Prato said "it is undoubtedly a classic amongst the legion of Kiss fans" and especially praised the "great" live performance on Alive!.

== Appearances ==
"Deuce" has appeared on the following Kiss albums:

- Kiss – studio version
- Alive! – live version
- The Originals – studio version
- Double Platinum – studio version
- Smashes, Thrashes & Hits – remixed studio version
- Alive III -live version
- Kiss My Ass: Classic Kiss Regrooved - recorded by Lenny Kravitz
- Greatest Kiss – studio version
- The Box Set – demo version
- The Very Best of Kiss – studio version
- Kiss Symphony: Alive IV – live version
- The Best of Kiss: The Millennium Collection – studio version
- Kiss Instant Live – live version
- Gold – studio version
- Kiss Chronicles: 3 Classic Albums – studio version
- Kiss Alive! 1975–2000 – Alive! and Alive III versions
- Kiss Alive 35 – live version
- Ikons – studio version
- Jigoku-Retsuden – rerecorded version
- Kiss Sonic Boom Over Europe – live version
- Ace Frehley, 12 Picks – live version

== Personnel ==
=== Kiss, Alive! and Alive! The Millennium Concert personnel ===
- Gene Simmons – bass guitar, lead vocals
- Paul Stanley – rhythm guitar, backing vocals
- Peter Criss – drums
- Ace Frehley – lead guitar

=== Alive III personnel ===
- Gene Simmons – bass guitar, lead vocals
- Paul Stanley – rhythm guitar, backing vocals
- Eric Singer – drums
- Bruce Kulick – lead guitar

=== Kiss Symphony: Alive IV personnel ===
- Gene Simmons – bass guitar, lead vocals
- Paul Stanley – rhythm guitar, backing vocals
- Peter Criss – drums
- Tommy Thayer – lead guitar

=== Kiss Instant Live, Kiss Alive 35, Kiss Sonic Boom Over Europe and Jigoku-Retsuden personnel ===
- Gene Simmons – bass guitar, lead vocals
- Paul Stanley – rhythm guitar, backing vocals
- Eric Singer – drums
- Tommy Thayer – lead guitar
