= Kiss discography =

Cataloging of published recordings by Kiss

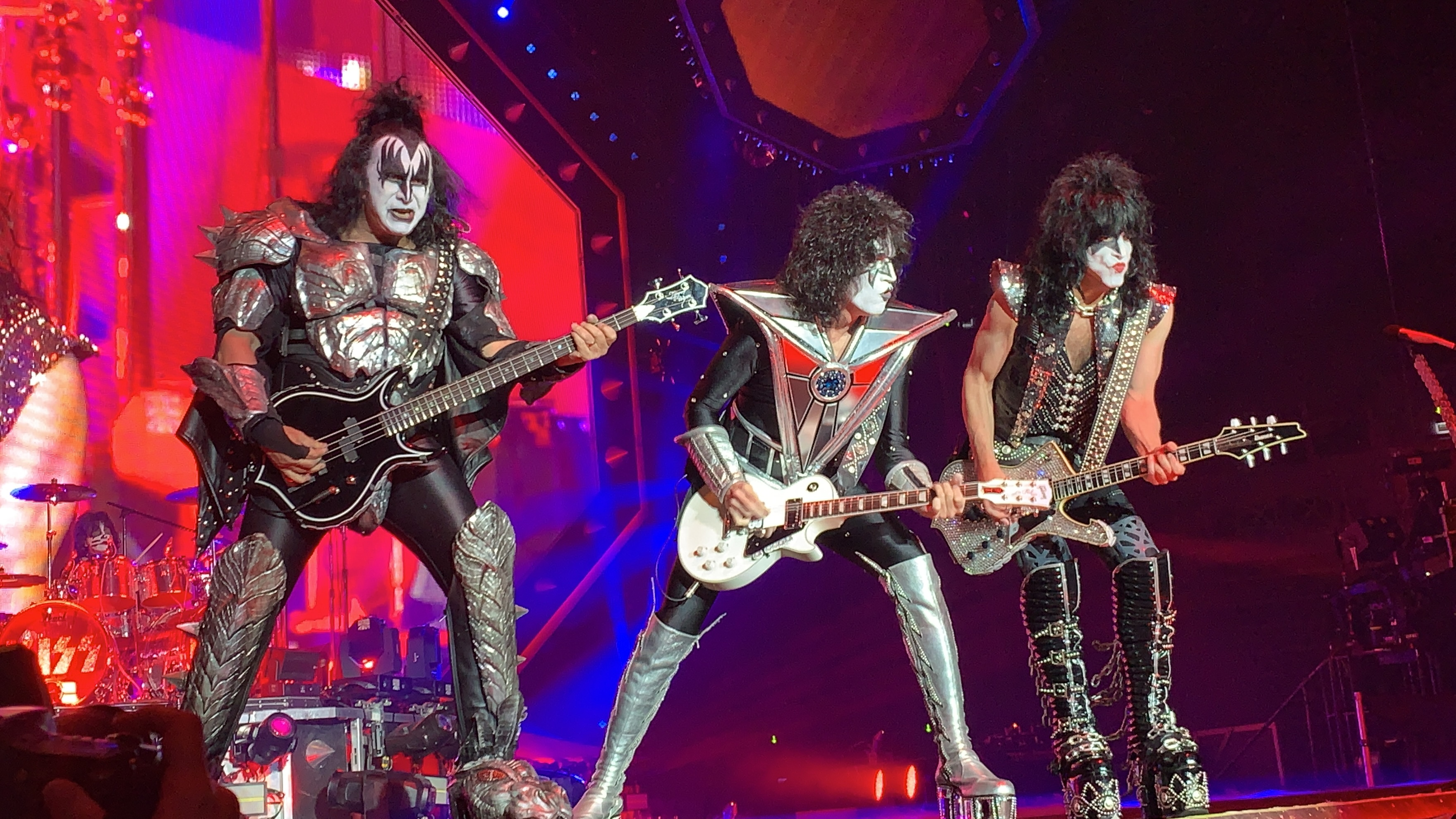
- Studio albums: 20
- Extended plays: 2
- Live albums: 13
- Compilation albums: 14
- Tribute albums: 8
- Singles: 67
- Reissues: 3
- Box set albums: 8
- '78 solo albums: 4
- Instant Live albums: 3

The American rock band Kiss has released 20 studio albums (24 counting the unified 1978 solo albums), 13 live albums, 2 extended plays and 67 singles. Formed in New York City in 1973, the group initially consisted of bassist Gene Simmons, rhythm guitarist Paul Stanley, lead guitarist Ace Frehley, and drummer Peter Criss; this most recognizable and successful lineup lasted until Criss' departure in 1980. The band is known for its makeup and on-stage antics, which influenced many artists who later used similar effects in their concerts. Stanley and Simmons were the only members to feature on every studio and live album during their entire run.

The band's eponymous debut album, released in 1974, did not have a hit single and rose only as high as 87 on Billboard, despite significant touring and promotion. The follow-up album, Hotter Than Hell (1974), was a bigger disappointment, peaking at 100 and quickly dropping off the charts. It rebounded in Canada peaking at number 29 in June 1976. Dressed to Kill, released in 1975, was a much bigger success, breaking into the top 40, but the band's record label, Casablanca Records, was close to bankruptcy and needed a commercial breakthrough. This would later be achieved with both Kiss' and Casablanca's first top-10 album, the double live album Alive!, which featured the number 12 hit "Rock and Roll All Nite". The next three albums, Destroyer, Rock and Roll Over, and Love Gun were successful, achieving Platinum status and spawning Top-20 singles (including the number 7 ballad "Beth", the band's highest-charting single in the US).

Their seventh studio release, Dynasty, while being a musical departure, was a global success, thanks largely to the worldwide hit "I Was Made for Lovin' You". The next three albums, Unmasked, Music from "The Elder" and Creatures of the Night, were domestic commercial failures, even as the band maintained popularity in many other parts of the world. Lick It Up was the first album featuring the band without makeup and was certified gold. Their next studio releases (Animalize; Asylum; Crazy Nights; Smashes, Thrashes & Hits) were more successful and Kiss recaptured some of their earlier glory (though not to the level of their 1970s heyday). Hot in the Shade was the lowest charting album of the unmasked era in the US, despite the success of the top-10 power ballad "Forever".

With their 16th studio release, Revenge, Kiss attempted to modernize their sound for the 1990s with heavier songs. The album initially charted at number 6 on the Billboard 200, and quickly reached Gold status in the US. 1997's Carnival of Souls: The Final Sessions was released after the reunion tour and did not receive much promotion. It has yet to be certified Gold in the US despite the album's lone single "Jungle" reaching number 8 on the US Mainstream Rock Tracks chart. Followed by a highly successful reunion, in 1998 Psycho Circus was released and was a moderate success. Their first album in 11 years, Sonic Boom, was released in 2009. The band released their 20th and final studio album, Monster, on October 9, 2012. To date, Kiss has had 25 million copies certified by the RIAA in the United States. The band has 30 gold albums as of July 2015.

The Kiss discography also includes a large number of unofficial bootleg releases. Most of them are live performances—audience recordings, radio broadcasts or soundboard recordings—but there are also unofficial releases featuring unreleased studio recordings. Some bootlegs are known to include fake "Kiss" songs recorded by other bands.

== Albums ==
=== Studio albums ===
Release	Title	Peak chart positions									Certifications
Release	Title	US	AUS	CAN	GER	NLD	NZ	NOR	SWE	UK	Certifications
1974	Kiss: Released: February 8, 1974; Label: Casablanca (#7001); Format: CD, LP, CS, 8-track	87	—	82	—	—	38	—	—	—	CAN: Gold; US: Gold
1974	Hotter Than Hell: Released: October 22, 1974; Label: Casablanca (#7006); Format: CD, LP, CS, 8-track	100	98	91	—	—	—	—	—	—	US: Gold
1975	Dressed to Kill: Released: March 19, 1975; Label: Casablanca (#7016); Format: LP, CD, CS, 8-track	32	—	26	—	—	—	—	—	—	US: Gold
1976	Destroyer: Released: March 15, 1976; Label: Casablanca (#7025); Format: CD, LP, CS, 8-track	11	6	6	16	68	16	25	4	22	US: 2× Platinum
1976	Rock and Roll Over: Released: November 11, 1976; Label: Casablanca (#7037); Format: LP, CD, CS, 8-track	11	16	7	39	—	—	—	9	—	US: Platinum
1977	Love Gun: Released: June 17, 1977; Label: Casablanca (#7057); Format: CD, LP, CS, 8-track	4	13	3	18	—	—	—	6	—	CAN: Platinum; US: Platinum
1979	Dynasty: Released: May 23, 1979; Label: Casablanca (#7152); Format: LP, CD, CS, 8-track	9	2	6	13	1	2	34	17	50	AUS: Platinum; CAN: 2 x Platinum; NL: Platinum; NZ: Platinum; US: Platinum
1980	Unmasked: Released: May 20, 1980; Label: Casablanca (#7225); Format: LP, CD, CS, 8-track	35	3	12	4	13	1	1	17	48	AUS: Platinum; CAN: Gold; NOR: Gold; NZ: Platinum; US: Gold
1981	Music from "The Elder": Released: November 16, 1981; Label: Casablanca (#7261); Format: LP, CD, CS, 8-track	75	11	—	10	39	—	7	19	51	AUS: Gold; NOR: Gold
1982	Creatures of the Night: Released: October 13, 1982; Label: Casablanca (#7270); Format: LP, CD, CS, 8-track	45	33	—	42	34	—	31	22	22	US: Gold
1983	Lick It Up: Released: September 18, 1983; Label: Mercury (#814-297-1); Format: LP, CD, CS, 8-track (record club only release)	24	36	46	18	14	—	7	3	7	CAN: Gold; US: Platinum
1984	Animalize: Released: September 13, 1984; Label: Mercury (#822-495-1); Format: LP, CD, CS, 8-track (record club only release)	19	40	41	25	17	—	14	8	11	CAN: Platinum; FIN: Gold; US: Platinum
1985	Asylum: Released: September 16, 1985; Label: Mercury (#826-099-1); Format: LP, CD, CS	20	89	54	43	34	—	11	3	12	CAN: Gold; US: Gold
1987	Crazy Nights: Released: September 18, 1987; Label: Mercury (#832-626-1); Format: LP, CD, CS	18	24	21	44	44	—	8	11	4	CAN: Platinum; FIN: Gold; US: Platinum; UK: Gold
1989	Hot in the Shade: Released: October 17, 1989; Label: Mercury (#838-913-1); Format: LP, CD, CS	29	30	46	46	—	—	8	29	35	CAN: Platinum; US: Gold
1992	Revenge: Released: May 19, 1992; Label: Mercury (#848-037-1); Format: LP, CD, CS	6	5	11	16	46	—	4	10	10	CAN: Gold; US: Gold
1997	Carnival of Souls: The Final Sessions: Released: October 28, 1997; Label: Mercury (#536-323-2); Format: LP, CD, CS	27	54	32	36	66	—	23	29	—	
1998	Psycho Circus: Released: September 22, 1998; Label: Mercury (#558-992-2); Format: LP, CD, CS	3	1	2	5	51	—	4	1	47	CAN: Gold; SWE: Gold; US: Gold
2009	Sonic Boom: Released: October 6, 2009; Label: Kiss Records (#2009-01); Format: LP, CD, CS	2	22	2	4	13	—	2	3	24	
2012	Monster: Released: October 9, 2012; Label: Universal; Format: LP, CD, CS	3	7	3	6	17	—	2	4	21	

==== 1978 solo albums ====
Release	Title	Peak chart positions			Certifications
Release	Title	US	AUS	CAN	Certifications
1978	Gene Simmons: Released: September 18, 1978; Label: Casablanca (#LP-7120); Format: CD, LP, CS, 8-track	22	32	21	CAN: Gold; US: Platinum
1978	Ace Frehley: Released: September 18, 1978; Label: Casablanca (#LP-7121); Format: CD, LP, CS, 8-track	26	48	34	CAN: Gold; US: Platinum
1978	Peter Criss: Released: September 18, 1978; Label: Casablanca (#LP-7122); Format: CD, LP, CS, 8-track	43	59	52	CAN: Gold; US: Platinum
1978	Paul Stanley: Released: September 18, 1978; Label: Casablanca (#LP-7123); Format: CD, LP, CS, 8-track	40	58	43	CAN: Gold; US: Platinum

=== Live albums ===
Release	Title	Peak chart positions							Certifications
Release	Title	US	AUS	CAN	GER	NOR	SWE	UK	Certifications
1975	Alive!: Released: September 10, 1975; Label: Casablanca (#LP-7020); Format: CD, LP, CS, 8-track	9	13	3	—	31	22	49	AUS: Gold; CAN: Gold; US: Gold
1977	Alive II: Released: October 24, 1977; Label: Casablanca (#LP-7076); Format: CD, LP, CS, 8-track	7	17	5	—	—	28	60	AUS: Gold; CAN: Platinum; US: 2× Platinum
1993	Alive III: Released: May 18, 1993; Label: Mercury (#514-777-2)	9	14	9	57	15	20	24	CAN: Gold; US: Gold
1996	Kiss Unplugged: Released: March 12, 1996; Label: Mercury (#528-950-1)	15	4	15	47	9	5	74	ARG: Gold; US: Gold
1996	You Wanted the Best, You Got the Best!!: Released: June 25, 1996; Label: Mercury (#532-741-1)	17	26	34	—	29	25	—	US: Gold
2003	Kiss Symphony: Alive IV: Released: July 22, 2003; Label: Sanctuary (#06076-84624-2)	18	14	10	15	5	23	—	CAN: Gold
2006	Alive! The Millennium Concert: Released: November 21, 2006; Label: Universal (#0007586-02)	167	—	—	—	—	—	—	
2016	Kiss Rocks Vegas: Released: August 26, 2016; Label: Eagle Rocks Entertainment	—	—	—	24	—	—	—	
2021	Off the Soundboard – Tokyo 2001: Released: June 11, 2021; Label: Eagle Rocks Entertainment	192	—	—	21	—	—	—	
2022	Off the Soundboard: Live in Virginia Beach 2004: Released: March 11, 2022; Label: Eagle Rocks Entertainment	—	—	—	—	—	—	—	
2022	Off the Soundboard: Live at Donington 1996: Released: June 10, 2022; Label: Eagle Rocks Entertainment	—	—	—	—	—	—	—	
2022	Off the Soundboard: Des Moines 1977: Released: July 28, 2022; Label: Eagle Rocks Entertainment	—	—	—	—	—	—	—	
2023	Off the Soundboard: Live In Poughkeepsie, NY 1984: Released: April 7, 2023; Label: Eagle Rocks Entertainment	—	—	—	—	—	—	—	
2025	Off the Soundboard: HemisFair Arena, San Antonio, Texas - December 3, 1985: Released: March 28, 2025; Label: Eagle Rocks Entertainment	—	—	—	—	—	—	—	

==== Instant Live album series ====
Release	Title
2004	Instant Live: Released: 2004; Label: Clear Channel
2008	Alive 35: Released: 2008–2009; Label: Clear Channel
2010	Sonic Boom over Europe: Released: 2010; Label: Clear Channel

=== Compilation albums ===
Release	Title	Peak chart positions							Certifications	Newly released content
Release	Title	US	AUS	CAN	GER	NOR	SWE	UK	Certifications	Newly released content
1978	Double Platinum: Released: April 1978; Label: Casablanca (#LP-7100); Format: CD, LP, CS, 8-track	22	17	15	—	—	—	—	AUS: Gold; CAN: Gold; US: Platinum	Yes
1982	Killers: Released: June 15, 1982; Label: Phonogram (#6302-193)	—	21	—	10	6	41	—	AUS: Gold	Yes
1988	Chikara: Released: May 25, 1988; Label: Polystar (#P30R-20008)	—	—	—	—	—	—	—		Yes
1988	Smashes, Thrashes & Hits: Released: November 15, 1988; Label: Mercury (#836-427-1)	21	38	53	65	13	30	62	CAN: Platinum; US: 2× Platinum	Yes
1997	Greatest Kiss: Released: April 8, 1997; Label: Mercury (#534-299-2)	77	11	—	64	25	3	58	ARG: Gold; AUS: Platinum; SWE: Gold	Yes
1999	Greatest Hits: Released: June 18, 1999; Label: Polygram	—	—	—	—	—	—	—	UK: Gold	No
2002	The Very Best of Kiss: Released: August 27, 2002; Label: Mercury (#440 063 122–2)	52	61	33	80	16	30	—	ARG: Gold; US: Gold	No
2003	The Millennium Collection: The Best of Kiss: Released: August 5, 2003; Label: Universal (#0000827-02)	132	—	—	—	—	—	—	US: Gold	No
2004	The Best of Kiss, Volume 2: The Millennium Collection: Released: June 15, 2004; Label: Universal (#0002549-02)	—	—	—	—	—	—	—		No
2005	Gold: Released: January 11, 2005; Label: Universal (#6-02498-63154-2)	—	—	200	—	—	—	—		No
2006	The Best of Kiss, Volume 3: The Millennium Collection: Released: October 10, 2006; Label: Universal (#0007332-02)	—	—	—	—	—	—	—		No
2008	Jigoku-Retsuden: Released: August 27, 2008; Label: Sony (#58)	—	—	—	—	—	—	—		Yes
2014	Kiss 40: Released: May 23, 2014; Label: Universal	30	31	—	—	—	—	—	UK: Silver	Yes
2017	Kissworld: The Best of Kiss: Released: June 2, 2017 (UK); January 25, 2019 (Worldwide); Label: Universal	—	60	—	37	—	—	18	UK: Gold	No

=== Box sets ===
Release	Title	Peak chart positions			Certifications	Newly released content
Release	Title	US	CAN	SWE	Certifications	Newly released content
1976	The Originals: Released: July 21, 1976; Label: Casablanca (#LP-7032-3); Format: 8-Track, LP, CS, CD	36	54	—		No
1978	The Originals II: Released: March 23, 1978; Label: Casablanca (#VIP-5504-6)	—	—	—		No
2001	The Box Set: Released: November 20, 2001; Label: Mercury (#586 561–2)	128	—	—	RIAA: Gold	Yes
2005	Kiss Chronicles: 3 Classic Albums: Released: June 21, 2005; Label: Mercury (#0004654-02)	—	—	—		No
2006	Kiss Alive! 1975–2000: Released: November 21, 2006; Label: Mercury (#0007586-02)	167	—	—		Yes
2008	Ikons: Released: October 21, 2008; Label: Universal (#001189802)	—	—	42		No
2012	The Casablanca Singles 1974–1982: Released: November 13, 2012; Label: Universal (#LP-7032-3)	—	—	—		No
2014	Kissteria – The Ultimate Vinyl Case: Released: June 2014; Label: Universal	—	—	—		No
2018	Kiss – The Solo Albums 40th Anniversary Collection: Released: October 2018; Label: Universal	—	—	—		No
2025	Dressed to Kill - 50th Anniversary Set: Released: October 2025; Label: Universal	—	—	—		Yes

== Extended plays ==
Release	Title
1974	Nothin' to Lose: Released: 1974; Label: Casablanca (#CBCD-771); Format: Vinyl, 7", 45 RPM single
1978	Strutter '78 (MX only): Released: 1978; Label: Casablanca (#EP 2453); Format: Vinyl, 7", 45 RPM single

== Singles ==
Release	Title	Peak chart positions								Certifications	Album
Release	Title	US	US Rock	AUS	CAN	GER	NZ	SWE	UK	Certifications	Album
February 18, 1974	"Nothin' to Lose"	—	—	—	—	—	—	—	—		Kiss
May 10, 1974	"Kissin' Time"	83	—	—	—	—	—	—	—		Kiss
August 10, 1974	"Strutter"	—	—	—	—	—	—	—	—		Kiss
October 22, 1974	"Let Me Go, Rock and Roll"	—	—	—	—	—	—	—	—		Hotter Than Hell
April 2, 1975	"Rock and Roll All Nite"	68	—	—	74	—	—	—	—	BPI: Silver	Dressed to Kill
July 10, 1975	"C'mon and Love Me"	—	—	—	—	—	—	—	—		Dressed to Kill
October 14, 1975	"Rock and Roll All Nite" (live)	12	—	18	13	—	—	—	—		Alive!
March 1, 1976	"Shout It Out Loud" (edit)	31	—	45	1	32	40	16	—		Destroyer
April 30, 1976	"Flaming Youth" (edit)	74	—	—	73	—	—	—	—		Destroyer
July 28, 1976	"Detroit Rock City"	—	—	—	99	14	—	—	—		Destroyer
August 11, 1976	"Beth"	7	—	79	5	—	—	—	—	RIAA: Gold; MC: Gold	Destroyer
November 1, 1976	"Hard Luck Woman"	15	—	67	15	34	—	—	—		Rock and Roll Over
February 13, 1977	"Calling Dr. Love" (edit)	16	—	93	2	—	—	—	—		Rock and Roll Over
June 1, 1977	"Christine Sixteen"	25	—	99	22	46	—	—	—		Love Gun
July 31, 1977	"Love Gun"	61	—	—	41	—	—	—	—		Love Gun
September 30, 1977	"Then She Kissed Me"	—	—	78	—	—	—	—	53 (Note: Chart position is from the official UK "Breakers List".)		Love Gun
November 29, 1977	"Shout It Out Loud" (live)	54	—	—	74	—	—	—	—		Alive II
February 22, 1978	"Rocket Ride" (edit)	39	—	—	46	—	—	—	—		Alive II
April 2, 1978	"Strutter '78" (alternate version)	—	—	89	—	—	—	—	—		Double Platinum
May 20, 1979	"I Was Made for Lovin' You" (edit)	11	—	2	1	2	1	19	50	RIAA: Gold; NVPI: Gold; MC: Gold; RIAJ: Gold; FIMI: Platinum; BPI: Platinum	Dynasty
September 30, 1979	"Sure Know Something"	47	—	4	48	25 (Note: The single was first released with "Dirty Livin'" as the A-side and "Sure Know Something" as the B-side when it reached no. 25, and later released with "Sure Know Something" as the A-side and "Dirty Livin'" as the B-side.)	11	—	—		Dynasty
1979	"Dirty Livin'"	—	—	—	—	—	—	—	—		Dynasty
1979	"Best of Solo Albums" (MX only)	—	—	—	—	—	—	—	—		Non-album single
January 1980	"Magic Touch"	—	—	—	—	—	—	—	—		Dynasty
February 1980	"2,000 Man"	—	—	—	—	—	—	—	—		Dynasty
June 1, 1980	"Shandi"	47	—	5	70	28	6	—	—		Unmasked
August 24, 1980	"Talk to Me"	—	—	39	—	32	—	—	—		Unmasked
November 1, 1980	"Tomorrow"	—	—	—	—	70	—	—	—		Unmasked
1980	"Is That You"	—	—	—	—	—	—	—	—		Unmasked
1980	"What Makes the World Go 'Round"	—	—	—	—	—	—	—	—		Unmasked
November 17, 1981	"A World Without Heroes"	56	—	—	—	—	—	—	55		Music from "The Elder"
November 17, 1981	"I"	—	—	24	—	62	—	—	—		Music from "The Elder"
January 25, 1982	"The Oath" (JP only)	—	—	—	—	—	—	—	—		Music from "The Elder"
October 13, 1982	"I Love It Loud"	102	—	76	45	—	—	—	—		Creatures of the Night
December 12, 1982	"Killer"	—	—	—	—	—	—	—	130		Creatures of the Night
March 1, 1983	"Creatures of the Night"	—	—	—	—	—	—	—	34		Creatures of the Night
September 18, 1983	"Lick It Up"	66	19	82	32	—	—	—	31		Lick It Up
February 6, 1984	"All Hell's Breakin' Loose" (edit)	—	—	—	—	71	—	—	—		Lick It Up
September 19, 1984	"Heaven's on Fire"	49	11	62	46	—	—	19	43		Animalize
January 13, 1985	"Thrills in the Night" (edit)	—	—	—	—	—	—	—	—		Animalize
September 9, 1985	"Tears Are Falling"	51	20	—	83	—	—	—	57		Asylum
August 18, 1987	"Crazy Crazy Nights"	65	37	34	—	—	—	—	4	BPI: Silver	Crazy Nights
November 12, 1987	"Reason to Live"	64	34	85	—	—	—	—	33		Crazy Nights
February 27, 1988	"Turn On the Night"	—	—	—	—	—	—	—	41		Crazy Nights
October 11, 1988	"Let's Put the X in Sex"	97	—	49	—	—	—	—	—		Smashes, Thrashes & Hits
March 3, 1989	"(You Make Me) Rock Hard"	—	—	101	—	—	—	—	—		Smashes, Thrashes & Hits
October 17, 1989	"Hide Your Heart"	66	22	60	92	—	—	—	59		Hot in the Shade
January 5, 1990	"Forever" (Remix)	8	17	73	18	—	—	—	65		Hot in the Shade
April 1, 1990	"Rise to It" (Remix)	81	40	144	—	—	—	—	—		Hot in the Shade
August 22, 1991	"God Gave Rock 'n' Roll to You II"	—	21	18	—	9	—	24	4		Revenge
May 4, 1992	"Unholy"	—	—	—	—	26	—	19	26		Revenge
1992	"Domino" (radio edit)	—	26	—	—	—	—	—	—		Revenge
1992	"I Just Wanna" (Radio EQ)	—	34	—	—	—	—	—	—		Revenge
1992	"Every Time I Look at You"	—	—	—	—	—	—	31	—		Revenge
May 8, 1993	"I Love It Loud" (live)	—	22	—	—	—	—	—	—		Alive III
1996	"Rock and Roll All Nite" (Unplugged)	—	13	—	57	—	—	—	—		Kiss Unplugged
1997	"Jungle" (radio edit)	—	8	—	—	—	—	—	—		Carnival of Souls: The Final Sessions
August 8, 1998	"Psycho Circus" (edit)	—	1	22	10	—	—	4	—		Psycho Circus
1998	"We Are One" (radio edit)	—	—	40	—	—	—	31	—		Psycho Circus
1998	"I Finally Found My Way"	—	—	—	—	—	—	—	—		Psycho Circus
November 23, 1998	"You Wanted the Best"	—	22	—	—	—	—	—	—		Psycho Circus
August 19, 2009	"Modern Day Delilah"	—	34	—	—	—	—	42	—		Sonic Boom
December 8, 2009	"Say Yeah"	—	—	—	—	—	—	—	—		Sonic Boom
June 11, 2010	"Never Enough"	—	—	—	—	—	—	—	—		Sonic Boom
July 2, 2012	"Hell or Hallelujah"	—	36	—	—	—	—	—	—		Monster
October 23, 2012	"Long Way Down"	—	—	—	—	—	—	—	—		Monster
January 28, 2015	"Yume no Ukiyo ni Saite Mi na" (with Momoiro Clover Z) (JP only) (Note: The single reached number 2 in Japan.)	—	—	—	—	—	—	—	—		Hakkin no Yoake (by Momoiro Clover Z)

The singles "Beth" and "I Was Made for Lovin' You" have been certified Gold by the RIAA and CRIA. The single "Psycho Circus" has been certified Gold by the IFPI Sweden.

=== '78 solo singles ===
List of singles, showing year released and album name
Title	Year	Album
"Radioactive" (edit)	1978	Gene Simmons
"Hold Me, Touch Me (Think of Me When We're Apart)"	1978	Paul Stanley
"New York Groove"	1978	Ace Frehley
"Don't You Let Me Down"	1978	Peter Criss
"You Matter to Me"	1978	Peter Criss

== Other appearances ==
=== Album appearances ===
Year	Song	Album	Notes
1999	"Nothing Can Keep Me from You"	Detroit Rock City	written by Dianne Warren
2003	"Do You Remember Rock 'n' Roll Radio?"	We're a Happy Family: A Tribute to Ramones	Ramones cover
2014	"Venus and Mars/Rock Show"	The Art of McCartney	Wings cover

=== Unreleased on album ===
- 2015: Scooby-Doo! and Kiss: Rock and Roll Mystery - "Don't Touch My Ascot"

== Videography ==
=== Video albums ===
Year	Title	Certifications
1985	Animalize Live Uncensored: Released: April 19, 1985; Label: Mercury Records; Formats: VHS	US: Platinum
1987	Exposed: Released: May 18, 1987; Label: PolyGram Music Video; Formats: VHS, DVD	US: Platinum; CAN: Platinum
1988	Crazy Nights: Released: June 6, 1988; Label: PolyGram Music Video; Formats: VHS	US: Gold
1992	X-treme Close-Up: Released: August 18, 1992; Label: PolyGram Music Video; Formats: VHS, DVD	US: Platinum; CAN: Gold
1993	Kiss Konfidential: Released: August 16, 1993; Label: PolyGram Music Video; Formats: VHS, DVD	US: Gold; CAN: Gold
1994	Kiss My Ass: The Video: Released: August 23, 1994; Label: PolyGram Music Video; Formats: VHS, DVD	US: Gold
1996	Kiss Unplugged: Released: March 12, 1996; Label: PolyGram Music Video; Formats: VHS, DVD	US: Gold
1998	Psycho Circus 3-D Video: Released: October 20, 1998; Label: Mercury Records; Formats: VHS, CD	US: Platinum
1998	The Second Coming: Released: November 24, 1998; Label: PolyGram Music Video; Formats: DVD	US: Platinum; AUS: 2× Platinum
2003	Kiss Symphony: The DVD: Released: September 10, 2003; Label: Sanctuary Records; Formats: DVD	US: 2× Platinum; ARG: Platinum; CAN: 2× Platinum; AUS: Platinum
2005	Rock the Nation Live!: Released: December 13, 2005; Label: Image Entertainment; Formats: DVD	US: 2× Platinum; CAN: 2× Platinum; AUS: Platinum
2006	Kissology Volume One: 1974–1977: Released: October 31, 2006; Label: VH1 Classic Records; Formats: DVD	US: 5× Platinum; CAN: 8× Platinum
2007	Kissology Volume Two: 1978–1991: Released: August 14, 2007; Label: VH1 Classic Records; Formats: DVD	US: 6× Platinum
2007	Kissology Volume Three: 1992–2000: Released: December 18, 2007; Label: VH1 Classic Records; Formats: DVD	US: 8× Platinum
2016	Kiss Rocks Vegas: Released: August 26, 2016; Label: Formats: DVD, Blu-Ray, CD	—

=== Films ===
Year	Film	Director(s)
1978	Kiss Meets the Phantom of the Park	Gordon Hessler
1999	Detroit Rock City	Adam Rifkin
2015	Scooby-Doo! and Kiss: Rock and Roll Mystery	Spike Brandt and Tony Cervone

=== TV series ===
In 2010 Love theme from Kiss appeared in the movie Somewhere, directed by Sofia Coppola.

- Kiss in the 1998 Millennium episode "...Thirteen Years Later", both as the band and as other characters out of makeup.
- Kiss was also featured in the Family Guy episodes "A Very Special Family Guy Freakin' Christmas" and "Road to Europe".
- In 2002, Kiss filmed a music video with the cast of the popular sitcom That '70s Show to announce that the show was going into syndication. The half-hour special showed behind the scenes of the making of the video. The half-hour special, called That '70s Kiss Show, aired on VH1.
- Gene Simmons makes a cameo appearance in the 2008 movie Detroit Metal City (a live action adaptation of the manga of the same name) as Jack ill Dark, a legendary Black metal guitarist from the United States.
- Gene Simmons and Paul Stanley appeared as themselves in the 2009 Fairly OddParents episode "Wishology Part 1: The Big Beginning."
- Kiss appeared on the season finale of American Idol in 2009 and 2014 during results shows in which they performed with Adam Lambert and Caleb Johnson.
- Gene Simmons appears as himself on the CSI: Crime Scene Investigation episode "Long Road Home".
- Gene Simmons makes an appearance on Castle, in the episode "To Love and Die in L.A." as a friend of the murder victim whose case Castle and Beckett investigate.
- Gene Simmons appears as himself on Angie Tribeca episode "Inside Man" in 2016.
- They also appear in an episode of What's New, Scooby-Doo? performing as themselves, they later appeared in the Scooby-Doo movie Scooby-Doo! and Kiss: Rock and Roll Mystery.
- Gene Simmons and Paul Stanley appear in the 2016 comedy film Why Him? as themselves.
- In 1976 Kiss appeared in The Paul Lynde Halloween Special as themselves.
- In 1998, Kiss appeared on the Mad TV Halloween special, performing comedy skits, but not singing.

=== Music videos ===
Year	Title	Director(s)
1974	"Deuce"	
1975	"Rock and Roll All Nite" (live, 1980 - Australia)	Unknown
1975	"C'mon and Love Me"	Unknown
1976	"I Want You"	Unknown
1976	"Hard Luck Woman"	Unknown
1976	"Love 'em, Leave 'em"	Unknown
1977	"Love Gun"	
1979	"I Was Made for Lovin' You"	John Goodhue
1979	"Sure Know Something"	John Goodhue
1980	"Shandi"	John Goodhue
1981	"A World Without Heroes" / "I"	Bruce Gowers
1982	"I Love It Loud"	Philip Davey
1983	"Lick It Up"	Martin Kahan
1983	"All Hell's Breakin' Loose"	Martin Kahan
1983	"Exciter"	
1984	"Heaven's on Fire"	David Lewis
1984	"Thrills in the Night"	Albie Vos
1985	"Tears Are Falling"	David Mallet
1985	"Who Wants to Be Lonely"	David Mallet
1985	"Uh! All Night"	David Mallet
1986	"Rock and Roll All Nite (Live)"	Claude Borenwzeig
1987	"Crazy Crazy Nights"	Jean Pellerin & Doug Freel
1987	"Reason to Live"	Marty Callner
1988	"Turn On the Night"	Marty Callner
1989	"Let's Put the 'X' in Sex"	Rebecca Blake
1989	"(You Make Me) Rock Hard"	Rebecca Blake
1989	"Hide Your Heart"	Marty Callner
1989	"Rise to It"	Mark Rezyka
1989	"Forever"	Mark Rezyka
1991	"God Gave Rock 'n' Roll to You II"	Mark Rezyka
1992	"Unholy"	Paul Rachman
1992	"I Just Wanna"	Paul Rachman
1992	"Domino"	Paul Rachman
1992	"Every Time I Look at You"	Mark Rezyka
1993	"I Love It Loud (Live)"	Joseph Young
1997	"Shout It Out Loud (Live)"	Wayne Isham
1998	"Psycho Circus"	James Hurlburt
2009	"Modern Day Delilah"	Wayne Isham

==== Lyric videos ====
Year	Title
2012	"Hell or Hallelujah"
2013	"Right Here Right Now"

== Tribute albums ==
Release	Title
1990	Hard to Believe: A Kiss Covers Compilation: Label: C/Z
1994	Kiss My Ass: Classic Kiss Regrooved: Label: Mercury
2003	Kiss My Grass: A Hillbilly Tribute to Kiss: Label: Dualtone
2003	A Tribute to the Creatures of the Night: Label: Nuclear Blast
2004	Spin the Bottle: An All-Star Tribute to Kiss: Label: Koch
2005	Gods of Thunder: A Norwegian Tribute to Kiss: Label: Voices of Wonder
2008	Lick It Up – A Millennium Tribute to Kiss: Label: Versailles
2008	Kiss My Ankh: Label: SplitScreen Entertainment

== See also ==
- List of songs recorded by Kiss
