= List of Kiss members =

List of members in the American hard rock band Kiss

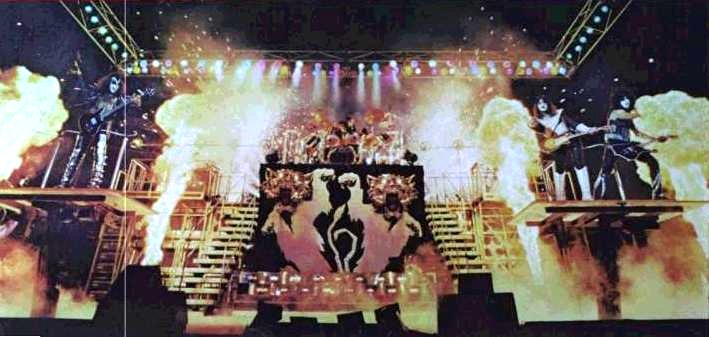
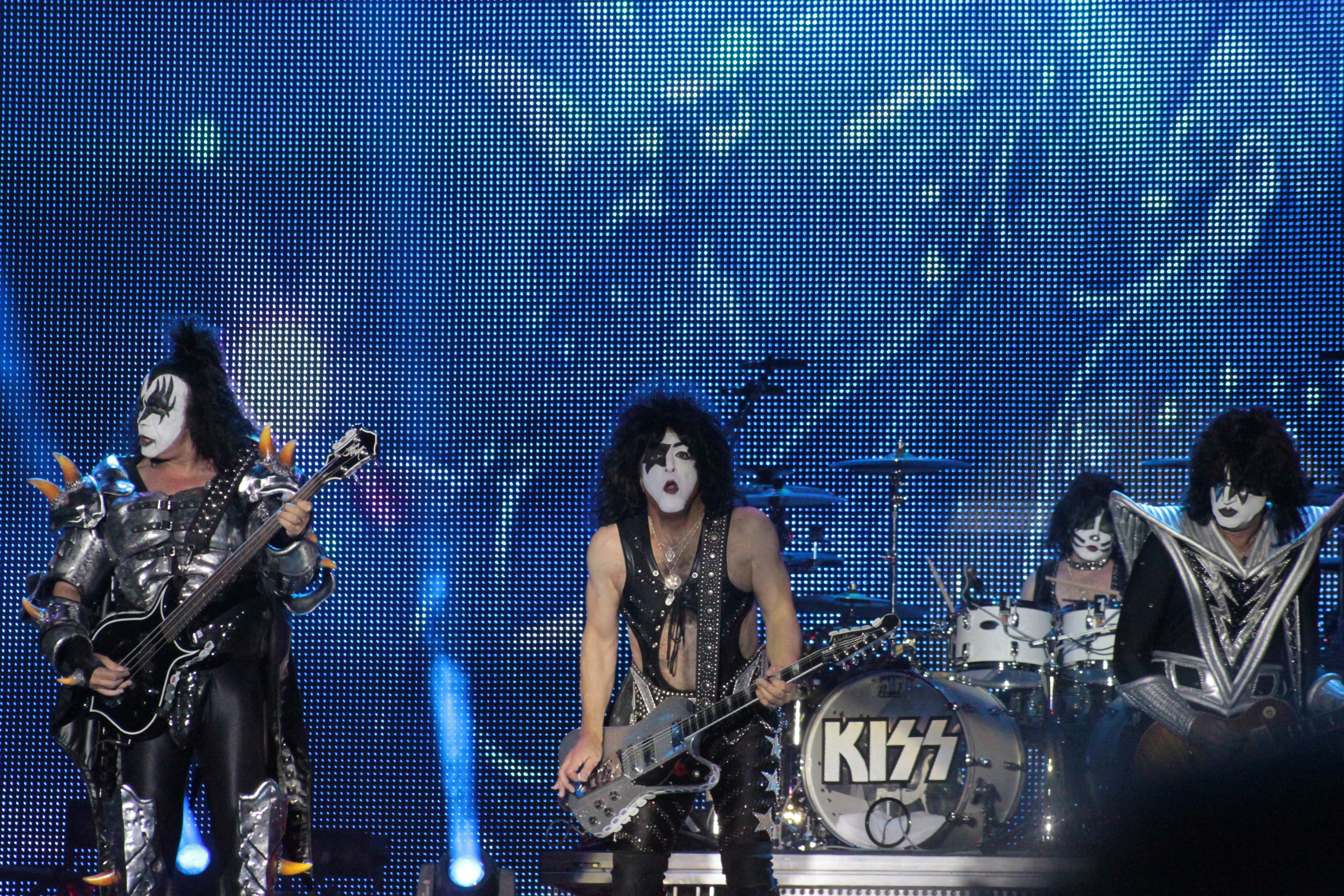
The original and final line-ups of Kiss performing live in 1977 (top) and 2013 (bottom), respectively.

Kiss was an American hard rock band from New York City, US. Formed in January 1973, the group originally featured rhythm guitarist Paul Stanley, bassist Gene Simmons, lead guitarist Ace Frehley and drummer Peter Criss, all of whom contributed to vocals. The band's lineup remained stable for seven years, before Criss left on May 18, 1980, after an injury and increasing personal tensions. He was replaced by Eric Carr, after Anton Fig filled in for 1979's Dynasty and 1980's Unmasked. Two years later Frehley also left the band.

Frehley was replaced by Vinnie Vincent, who debuted with the group in December 1982 after contributing to Creatures of the Night earlier in the year. Vincent also performed on Lick It Up, but was fired at the end of the album's promotional touring cycle in March 1984 for what Simmons called "unethical behavior". He was replaced the following month by Mark St. John, who performed on Animalize. After contracting arthritis which made it difficult to perform, he was temporarily replaced on the Animalize World Tour by Bruce Kulick; St. John's condition improved, performing two full shows and one partial show with Kiss in November 1984. However, it quickly became apparent that Kulick was a more natural fit musically than St. John. As a result, the replacement was made permanent in December and St. John was fired.

The lineup featuring Kulick was the most stable since the band's first incarnation, only ending on November 24, 1991, when Carr died of heart cancer. Due to his illness, Carr was temporarily replaced by Eric Singer for the recording of Revenge, and upon Carr's death Singer joined the band permanently. After performing with the band for several songs as part of MTV Unplugged the previous year, Frehley and Criss officially rejoined Kiss in April 1996 for a reunion tour. The group released new album Psycho Circus in 1998, but by January 2001 had splintered again, as Criss left between legs of the Kiss Farewell Tour and was replaced by Singer.

The following year, Frehley also left Kiss for a second time, with Tommy Thayer taking over his position in March 2002. In October that year, the band announced a special show with the Melbourne Symphony to feature original drummer Criss, who subsequently remained a full-time member. By February 2004, Criss was out of the band for a third time, with Singer returning to take his place again. The final line-up consisting of Stanley, Simmons, Singer and Thayer released two studio albums: 2009's Sonic Boom and 2012's Monster. Frehley died on October 16, 2025.

== Members ==
Image	Name (persona)	Years active	Instruments	Release contributions
	Paul Stanley (The Starchild)	1973–2023; 2025	lead and backing vocals; rhythm and lead guitar; bass guitar (1977–1998)	all Kiss releases
	Gene Simmons (The Demon)	1973–2023; 2025	lead and backing vocals; bass guitar; rhythm guitar (1975–1998)	all Kiss releases
	Ace Frehley (The Spaceman a.k.a. Space Ace)	1973–1982; 1996–2002 (guest in 1995 and 2018); (died 2025)	lead and rhythm guitar; backing and lead vocals; bass guitar (1974–1982)	all Kiss releases from Kiss (1974) to Music from "The Elder" (1981); Kiss Unplugged (1995); You Wanted the Best, You Got the Best!! (1996); Psycho Circus (1998); Alive! The Millennium Concert (2000)
	Peter Criss (The Catman)	1973–1980; 1996–2001; 2002–2004 (guest in 1995)	drums; percussion; backing and lead vocals	all Kiss releases from Kiss (1974) to Dynasty (1979); Kiss Unplugged (1995); You Wanted the Best, You Got the Best!! (1996); Psycho Circus (1998); Alive! The Millennium Concert (2000); Kiss Symphony: Alive IV (2003)
	Eric Carr (The Fox)	1980–1991 (until his death)	drums; percussion; backing and lead vocals; acoustic guitar; bass guitar (1980–1989)	all Kiss releases from Music from "The Elder" (1981) to Revenge (1992)
	Vinnie Vincent (The Wiz)	1982–1984 (guest songwriter, 1991–1992)	lead guitar; backing vocals	Creatures of the Night (1982); Lick It Up (1983); Revenge (1992) (songwriting only)
	Mark St. John	1984 (died 2007)	lead guitar; backing vocals	Animalize (1984)
	Bruce Kulick	1984–1996 (guest in 2018, 2019, 2021, and 2025)	lead and rhythm guitar; backing vocals; keyboards (1987–1988); lead vocals (1995–1996); bass guitar (1985–1996)	all Kiss releases from Animalize (1984) (lead guitar on “Murder in High-Heels” and “Lonely Is the Hunter” only) to Psycho Circus (1998) (guitar and bass on select songs)
	Eric Singer (The Catman)	1991–1996; 2001–2002; 2004–2023; 2025	drums; percussion; backing and lead vocals; piano (2019–2023)	all Kiss releases from Revenge (1992) to Carnival of Souls: The Final Sessions (1997), and from Sonic Boom (2009) onwards
	Tommy Thayer (The Spaceman)	2002–2023; 2025; (session musician 1989, 1992, 1998)	lead guitar; backing and lead vocals	Hot in the Shade (1989) – "Betrayed" and "The Street Giveth and the Street Taketh Away" only; Revenge (1992) – backing vocals on select tracks only; Carnival of Souls: The Final Sessions (1997) – songwriting on “Childhood’s End” only; all Kiss releases from Psycho Circus (1998) onwards (except Alive! The Millennium Concert (2000))

=== Touring ===
Image	Name	Years active	Instruments	Release contributions
	Gary Corbett	1987–1990 (died 2021)	keyboards	Corbett was the band's first live keyboardist, performing on the Crazy Nights and Hot in the Shade Tours.
	Derek Sherinian	1992	keyboards	Sherinian took over from Corbett for the 1992 Revenge Tour, before Kiss ceased using live keyboardists.

=== Session ===
Image	Name	Years active	Instruments	Release contributions
	Bruce Foster	1973–1974	acoustic piano	Kiss (1974)
	Warren Dewey	1973–1974	fire engine	Kiss (1974)
	Dick Wagner	1975–1976; 1991–1992 (died 2014)	guitar solo; guitar licks; acoustic guitar	Destroyer (1976); Revenge (1992)
	Brooklyn Boys Chorus	1975–1976	additional vocals	Destroyer (1976)
	David and Josh Ezrin	1975–1976	voices	Destroyer (1976)
	New York Philharmonic	1975–1976	orchestra	Destroyer (1976)
	Bob Ezrin	1975–1976; 1981; 1998	keyboards; piano; bass; fender Rhodes	Destroyer (1976); Music from "The Elder" (1981); Revenge (1992); Psycho Circus (1998)
	Jimmy Maelen	1977 (died 1988)	conga drums	Love Gun (1977)
	Eddie Kramer	1977	keyboards	Love Gun (1977)
	Ray Simpson	1977	backing vocals	Love Gun (1977)
	Hilda Harris	1977	backing vocals	Love Gun (1977)
	Tasha Thomas	1977 (died 1984)	backing vocals	Love Gun (1977)
	Bob Kulick	1977; 1980; 1982 (died 2020)	lead guitar; additional guitar	Alive II (1977); Unmasked (1980); Killers (1982)
	Anton Fig	1979; 1980	drums	Dynasty (1979); Unmasked (1980)
	Vini Poncia	1979; 1980	keyboards; percussion; backing vocals	Dynasty (1979); Unmasked (1980)
	Tom Harper	1980	bass	Unmasked (1980)
	Holly Knight	1980	keyboards	Unmasked (1980)
	Tony Powers	1981	keyboards	Music from "The Elder" (1981)
	Michael Kamen	1981 (died 2003)	orchestral arrangements	Music from "The Elder" (1981)
	Allan Schwartzberg	1981; 1984; 1985	drums; overdubbed additional drums	Music from "The Elder" (1981); Animalize (1984); Asylum (1985)
	Robben Ford	1982	lead guitar	Creatures of the Night (1982)
	Steve Farris	1982	lead guitar	Creatures of the Night (1982)
	Adam Mitchell	1982	additional guitar and end lick	Creatures of the Night (1982)
	Dave Wittman	1982	backing vocals	Creatures of the Night (1982)
	Jimmy Haslip	1982	bass	Creatures of the Night (1982)
	Mike Porcaro	1982 (died 2015)	bass	Creatures of the Night (1982)
	Rick Derringer	1983 (died 2025)	guitar solo	Lick It Up (1983)
	Desmond Child	1984	backing vocals	Animalize (1984)
	Mitch Weissman	1984	additional guitar; bass	Animalize (1984)
	Jean Beauvoir	1984; 1985	bass; backing vocals	Animalize (1984); Asylum (1985)
	Tom Kelly	1987	backing vocals	Crazy Nights (1987)
	Phil Ashley	1987; 1989; (died 2020)	keyboards	Crazy Nights (1987); Hot in the Shade (1989)
	Charlotte Crossley	1989	backing vocals	Hot in the Shade (1989)
	Valerie Pinkston	1989	backing vocals	Hot in the Shade (1989)
	Kim Edwards-Brown	1989	backing vocals	Hot in the Shade (1989)
	Pat Regan	1989	saxes	Hot in the Shade (1989)
	All Star Cadillac Brass	1989	horns	Hot in the Shade (1989)
	Kevin Valentine	1989; 1991–1992; 1998	drums	Hot in the Shade (1989); Revenge (1992); Psycho Circus (1998)
	Jesse Damon	1991–1992	backing vocals	Revenge (1992)
	Jaime St. James	1991–1992	backing vocals	Revenge (1992)
	The Crossroads Boys Choir	1995–1996	backing vocals	Carnival of Souls: The Final Sessions (1997)
	Nick Simmons	1995–1996	backing vocals	Carnival of Souls: The Final Sessions (1997)
	Carole Keiser	1995–1996	choir management; string arrangement	Carnival of Souls: The Final Sessions (1997)
	Shelly Berg	1998	acoustic piano; orchestration and conductor	Psycho Circus (1998)
	Brian Whelan	2007–2009; 2011–2012	piano	Sonic Boom (2009); Monster (2012)

== Lineups ==
Period	Members	Releases
January 1973 – May 1980	Paul Stanley – vocals, rhythm guitar; Gene Simmons – vocals, bass; Peter Criss – drums, vocals; Ace Frehley – lead guitar, vocals	Kiss (1974); Hotter than Hell (1974); Dressed to Kill (1975); Alive! (1975); Destroyer (1976); Rock and Roll Over (1976); Love Gun (1977); Alive II (1977); Dynasty (1979); Unmasked (1980); You Wanted the Best, You Got the Best!! (1996)
May 1980 – December 1982	Paul Stanley – vocals, rhythm guitar; Gene Simmons – vocals, bass; Ace Frehley – lead guitar, vocals; Eric Carr – drums, vocals	Music from "The Elder" (1981); Killers (1982) – four tracks only
December 1982 – March 1984	Paul Stanley – vocals, rhythm guitar; Gene Simmons – vocals, bass; Eric Carr – drums, vocals; Vinnie Vincent – lead guitar, backing vocals	Creatures of the Night (1982); Lick It Up (1983)
April – December 1984	Paul Stanley – vocals, rhythm guitar; Gene Simmons – vocals, bass; Eric Carr – drums, vocals; Mark St. John – lead guitar, backing vocals	Animalize (1984)
December 1984 – November 1991	Paul Stanley – vocals, rhythm guitar; Gene Simmons – vocals, bass; Eric Carr – drums, vocals; Bruce Kulick – lead guitar, backing vocals	Asylum (1985); Animalize Live Uncensored (1985); Crazy Nights (1987); Smashes, Thrashes & Hits (1988); Hot in the Shade (1989); Revenge (1992) – two tracks only
December 1991 – April 1996	Paul Stanley – vocals, rhythm guitar; Gene Simmons – vocals, bass; Bruce Kulick – lead guitar, backing vocals; Eric Singer – drums, vocals	Revenge (1992); Alive III (1993); Kiss Konfidential (1993); Kiss Unplugged (1996); Carnival of Souls: The Final Sessions (1997)
April 1996 – January 2001	Paul Stanley – vocals, rhythm guitar; Gene Simmons – vocals, bass; Ace Frehley – lead guitar, vocals; Peter Criss – drums, vocals	Psycho Circus (1998); Alive! The Millennium Concert (2006)
January 2001 – March 2002	Paul Stanley – vocals, rhythm guitar; Gene Simmons – vocals, bass; Ace Frehley – lead guitar, vocals; Eric Singer – drums, vocals	none
March – October 2002	Paul Stanley – vocals, rhythm guitar; Gene Simmons – vocals, bass; Eric Singer – drums, vocals; Tommy Thayer – lead guitar, backing vocals	none
October 2002 – March 2004	Paul Stanley – vocals, rhythm guitar; Gene Simmons – vocals, bass; Tommy Thayer – lead guitar, backing vocals; Peter Criss – drums, vocals	Kiss Symphony: Alive IV (2003)
April 2004 – December 2023	Paul Stanley – vocals, rhythm guitar; Gene Simmons – vocals, bass; Tommy Thayer – lead guitar, vocals; Eric Singer – drums, vocals	Instant Live (2004); Rock the Nation Live! (2005); Jigoku-Retsuden (2008); Alive 35 (2008); Sonic Boom (2009); Sonic Boom Over Europe (2010); Monster (2012); "Yume no Ukiyo ni Saite Mi na" (2015); Kiss Rocks Vegas (2016)
November 14 & 15, 2025	Paul Stanley – vocals, rhythm guitar; Gene Simmons – vocals, bass; Tommy Thayer – lead guitar, vocals; Eric Singer – drums, vocals; Bruce Kulick – guitar (guest)	none
