= Kiss My Ass Tour =

1994–1995 concert tour by Kiss

- Tour by Kiss
- Poster to the concert in Melbourne, Australia
- Start date: April 2, 1994
- End date: February 13, 1995
- Legs: 5
- No. of shows: 23

Kiss concert chronology
- Revenge Tour (1992); Kiss My Ass Tour (1994–1995); Alive/Worldwide Tour (1996–1997)

The Kiss My Ass Tour was a concert tour by American rock band Kiss. It was the last tour to feature drummer Eric Singer as a member until 2004, and the last tour with guitarist Bruce Kulick.

== Background ==
Kiss opened the tour with a performance at the WWBZ 103.5 Blazefest in Villa Park. In late August and early September 1994, Kiss toured South America as headliners on the touring Monsters of Rock festival alongside Slayer and Black Sabbath.

Following the Monsters of Rock tour, the band toured Japan in January 1995 on their own, and in February 1995 they toured Australia for the first time since 1980. During the Japan leg, the band had established the "Kiss Aid Save The City Fund", raising more than $10,000 for the survivors of the Great Hanshin earthquake in Kobe, Japan. The tour featured props like the Sphinx which returned from the Hot in the Shade Tour, fireworks, lasers, strippers and the giant logo with the band's name. During this tour, Kiss would also go on to host a tour of "Kiss conventions" at various hotels and convention centers to do what other fan-created Kiss conventions had done before. Following the tour, there was an exclusive performance in which the band performed an acoustic set on MTV for their live album Kiss Unplugged, joined by Ace Frehley and Peter Criss.

In the tour program for the band's final tour, Stanley reflected on the tour:

Doing MTV Unplugged was not really to prove anything to anybody or win converts. It really was us, maybe for ourselves, showing how good these songs are. We did them during the Kiss conventions. So many of those songs were written on acoustic guitars; they were written in a much more simple fashion than they're played. The philosophy has always been, "if it doesn't sound good on one guitar it's a shitty song."

== Set list ==
This is an example setlist performed at a show, but may not represent the majority of the shows on this tour.

1. "Creatures of the Night"
2. "Deuce"
3. "Parasite"
4. "Unholy"
5. "I Stole Your Love"
6. "Cold Gin"
7. "Got To Choose"
8. "Firehouse"
9. "Calling Dr. Love"
10. "Makin' Love"
11. "I Was Made for Lovin' You"
12. "I Want You"
13. "Domino"
14. "Love Gun"
15. "Lick It Up"
16. "God of Thunder"
17. "I Love It Loud"
18. "Detroit Rock City"
19. "Black Diamond"
20. "Heaven's on Fire"
21. "Rock and Roll All Nite"
- "King of the Night Time World" opened shows on certain dates of the tour.
- "Goin' Blind" was played at the beginning of the tour but was abandoned by the set list.
- "Strutter" and "100,000 Years" were played occasionally.
- "She", "Forever", "Take It Off" and "God Gave Rock 'n' Roll to You II" were played occasionally on the tour.

== Tour dates ==
List of 1994 concerts
Date	City	Country	Venue	Opening Act(s)
April 2, 1994	Villa Park	United States	Odeum Expo Center	—N/a
April 19, 1994	San Antonio	United States	Freeman Coliseum	Lita Ford; Snakedance
July 30, 1994	Nashville	United States	Riverfront Park	Fleetwood Mac; Pat Travers; Mother Station; Gypsy Carnes; Brother Cane
August 27, 1994	São Paulo	Brazil	Estádio do Pacaembu	—N/a
September 1, 1994	Santiago	Chile	Estación Mapocho	—N/a
September 3, 1994	Buenos Aires	Argentina	River Plate Stadium	—N/a
September 5, 1994	Buenos Aires	Argentina	Obras Sanitarias	—N/a
September 8, 1994	Mexico City	Mexico	Palacio de los Deportes	Victimas del Dr. Cerebro
September 14, 1994	Buenos Aires	Argentina	Obras Sanitarias	Logos
September 15, 1994	Buenos Aires	Argentina	Obras Sanitarias	Logos
September 16, 1994	Buenos Aires	Argentina	Obras Sanitarias	Logos
October 21, 1994	Phoenix	United States	Arizona State Fair	—N/a

List of 1995 concerts
Date	City	Country	Venue	Opening Act(s)
January 24, 1995	Osaka	Japan	Osaka Castle Hall	—N/a
January 26, 1995	Fukuoka	Japan	Kokusai Center	—N/a
January 28, 1995	Nagoya	Japan	Nagoya Century Hall	—N/a
January 30, 1995	Tokyo	Japan	Nippon Budokan	—N/a
January 31, 1995	Tokyo	Japan	Nippon Budokan	—N/a
February 4, 1995	Perth	Australia	Perth Entertainment Centre	The Poor
February 6, 1995	Adelaide	Australia	Adelaide Entertainment Centre	The Poor
February 8, 1995	Melbourne	Australia	National Tennis Centre at Flinders Park	The Poor
February 9, 1995	Melbourne	Australia	National Tennis Centre at Flinders Park	The Poor
February 11, 1995	Brisbane	Australia	Brisbane Entertainment Centre	The Poor
February 13, 1995	Sydney	Australia	Sydney Entertainment Centre	The Poor

== Personnel ==
- Paul Stanley – vocals, rhythm guitar
- Gene Simmons – vocals, bass
- Bruce Kulick – lead guitar, backing vocals
- Eric Singer – drums, backing vocals
