= The Best of Kiss, Volume 3: The Millennium Collection =

Greatest hits album by Kiss
- Released: October 10, 2006
- Recorded: 1991–1999
- Genre: Hard rock
- Length: 49:01
- Label: Mercury; Universal

Kiss chronology
Gold (2005)	The Best of Kiss, Volume 3: The Millennium Collection (2006)	Alive! The Millennium Concert (2006)

Professional ratings
Review scores
Source	Rating
AllMusic	2.5/5 stars
Rolling Stone	3/5 stars

The Best of Kiss, Volume 3: The Millennium Collection is the first compilation to feature exclusively the 1990s output from American rock band Kiss. The album was released on November 21, 2006. It is the final installment in the Millennium Collection trilogy of albums featuring material from the band Kiss.

This disc, along with Volumes 1 and 2 of the Millennium Collection was repackaged and released as a collection known as Playlist...Plus.

== Track listing ==
No.	Title	Writer(s)	Original Album	Length
1.	"God Gave Rock 'n' Roll to You II"	Russ Ballard, Paul Stanley, Gene Simmons, Bob Ezrin	Revenge	5:21
2.	"Unholy"	Simmons, Vinnie Vincent	Revenge	3:43
3.	"Domino" (live in 1992)	Simmons	Alive III	3:49
4.	"Hate"	Simmons, Scott Van Zen, Bruce Kulick	Carnival of Souls: The Final Sessions	4:37
5.	"Childhood's End"	Simmons, Tommy Thayer, Kulick	Carnival of Souls: The Final Sessions	4:21
6.	"I Will Be There"	Stanley, Kulick, Curtis Cuomo	Carnival of Souls: The Final Sessions	3:50
7.	"Comin' Home" (live unplugged in 1995)	Ace Frehley, Stanley	Kiss Unplugged	2:51
8.	"Got To Choose" (live unplugged in 1995)	Stanley	Kiss Unplugged (Japanese release)	3:33
9.	"Psycho Circus"	Stanley, Cuomo	Psycho Circus	4:51
10.	"Into the Void"	Frehley, Karl Cochran	Psycho Circus	4:22
11.	"I Pledge Allegiance to the State of Rock and Roll"	Stanley, Holly Knight, Cuomo	Psycho Circus	3:33
12.	"Nothing Can Keep Me From You"	Diane Warren	Detroit Rock City (Soundtrack)	4:00

== Personnel ==
Members

- Paul Stanley – Vocals, Rhythm Guitar, Guitar Solo (track 11–12), Acoustic Guitar (tracks 6–8, 12), Bass (track 11)
- Gene Simmons – Vocals, Bass
- Peter Criss – Drums (track 10)
- Ace Frehley – Vocals and Lead Guitar (track 10)
- Eric Carr – Backing Vocals (track 1)
- Bruce Kulick – Lead Guitar, Bass (tracks 6, 9 & 12), Acoustic Guitar Solo (track 6), Backing Vocals
- Eric Singer – Drums, Backing Vocals
- Tommy Thayer – Lead Guitar (tracks 9 & 11)

Additional personnel

- Steve Ferrone – Drums (track 12)
- Kevin Valentine – Drums (tracks 9 & 11)
- David Campbell – Strings and Horn Arrangement (track 12)
