= Kiss Konfidential =

Video by Kiss
- Released: August 16, 1993
- Recorded: Auburn Hills, Michigan, Indianapolis, Indiana and Cleveland, Ohio. November 27–29, 1992
- Genre: Hard rock, heavy metal
- Label: PolyGram
- Director: Tim Rozner & Jack Edward Sawyers
- Producer: KISS & Jack Edward Sawyers

Kiss chronology
X-treme Close-Up (1992)	Kiss Konfidential (1993)	Kiss My Ass: The Video (1994)

Professional ratings
Review scores
Source	Rating
Allmusic	3/5 stars

Kiss Konfidential is a music VHS by American hard rock band Kiss released on August 16, 1993. The video features 13 live performances and also features backstage interviews from their Revenge Tour. There is also a variety of vintage clips from the 1970s.

The video has been praised as it features backstage footage of the band on the road, and shows what it takes to make one of Kiss's shows come to life. It was certified Gold in the US.

== Track listing ==
No.	Title	Writer(s)	Length
1.	"Creatures of the Night"	Paul Stanley, Adam Mitchell	4:51
2.	"Deuce"	Gene Simmons	3:20
3.	"I Just Wanna"	Stanley, Vinnie Vincent	4:19
4.	"Unholy"	Simmons, Vincent	3:24
5.	"Heaven's on Fire"	Stanley, Desmond Child	4:11
6.	"100,000 Years" (live at Detroit in '76)	Stanley, Simmons	6:37
7.	"Nothin' to Lose" (Live in San Francisco in '75)	Simmons	3:28
8.	"Hotter Than Hell" (Live in Detroit in '76)	Stanley	3:08
9.	"Let Me Go, Rock 'n' Roll" (Live in Japan in '77)	Stanley, Simmons	2:58
10.	"Domino"	Simmons	3:44
11.	"Lick It Up"	Stanley, Vincent	4:11
12.	"Forever"	Stanley, Michael Bolton	3:50
13.	"Take It Off"	Simmons, Bob Ezrin, Kane Roberts	5:48
14.	"I Love It Loud"	Stanley, Vincent	4:01
15.	"God Gave Rock 'n' Roll to You II"	Stanley, Simmons, Ezrin, Russ Ballard	5:43
16.	"The Star Spangled Banner"	Francis Scott Key	2:23

== Personnel ==
- Paul Stanley – rhythm guitar, vocals
- Gene Simmons – bass guitar, vocals
- Bruce Kulick – lead guitar and backing vocals on all tracks except 6–9
- Eric Singer – drums and backing vocals on all tracks except 6–9
- Ace Frehley – lead guitar and backing vocals on tracks 6–9
- Peter Criss – drums and backing vocals on tracks 6–9, co-lead vocals on track 7

== Certifications ==
Region	Certification	Certified units/sales
Canada (Music Canada)	Gold	5,000^{^}
United States (RIAA)	Gold	50,000^{^}
^{^} Shipments figures based on certification alone.
