= Kiss My Ass =

Kiss My Ass may refer to:

- Kiss My Ass: Classic Kiss Regrooved, a tribute album featuring cover versions of Kiss songs
- Kiss My Ass: The Video, a video album tour by Kiss
- Kiss My Ass Tour, music tour of Kiss
- Kiss My Ass, initial working title of Jadakiss's album The Last Kiss (album)
- Kiss my ass match, a professional wrestling match where the losing wrestler must kiss the winning wrestler's buttocks

== See also ==
- Kiss My B-ass
- Kiss My Ass Club, a club created by Vince MacMahon which consisted of WWE employees being ordered to kiss his buttocks in the middle of the ring
