= Gods of Thunder: A Norwegian Tribute to Kiss =

Compilation album by Various Artists
- Released: September 5, 2005
- Genre: Hard rock, heavy metal
- Length: 72:08
- Label: Voices of Wonder
- Producer: Various

Gods of Thunder: A Norwegian Tribute to Kiss is a Norwegian compilation album by various artists. The album is a tribute to the American hard rock band Kiss. The album reached 13th on Norway's national charts.

== Album art ==
The album art on the album was designed by Ken Kelly, who designed various 1970s Kiss album covers, including Love Gun and Destroyer.

== Critical reception ==
Stavanger Aftenblad called Span's "Parasite" overly serious and Stage Dolls' "Beth" unconvincing, but Kissettes' "I Just Wanna" was noted as a fun cover version. Rana Blad said most of the covers are identical to the originals, just worse and more boring". Halden Arbeiderblad called it a decent album overall and noted "Detroit Rock City" and "I Was Made for Lovin' You" as the best covers on the album. Dagsavisen said the idea has been done better before. The cover of "Crazy Crazy Nights" was said to be the standout track. Gjengangeren said the album is interesting to listen to despite a few missteps. Now Toronto wrote: "It's kinda like listening to average bar cover bands [...]"

In 2015, VH1 included Ulver's "Strange Ways" on their list "The 10 Best Extreme Metal Covers of Kiss Songs".

== Track listing ==
No.	Title	Writer(s)	Artist	Length
1.	"Intro"			0:46
2.	"Detroit Rock City"	Stanley/Ezrin	Ronni Le Tekrø & Tony Harnell	3:47
3.	"I Was Made for Lovin' You"	Stanley/Poncia/Child	Wig Wam & Bruce Kulick	4:04
4.	"Sure Know Something"	Stanley/Poncia	Espen Lind	4:15
5.	"Crazy Crazy Nights"	Stanley/Mitchell	Kurt Nilsen	3:44
6.	"Getaway"	Frehley	The Carburetors	2:32
7.	"I Just Wanna"	Stanley/Vincent	KISSettes	4:07
8.	"Beth"	Criss/Ezrin/Penridge	Stage Dolls	2:56
9.	"Parasite"	Frehley	Span	3:47
10.	"Uh! All Night"	Stanley/Child/Beauvoir	Diabla	4:08
11.	"She"	Simmons/Coronel	Unmasked	4:59
12.	"Shout It Out Loud"	Stanley/Simmons/Ezrin	Surferosa	3:40
13.	"Mr. Blackwell"	Simmons/Reed	Lost at Last	4:05
14.	"I Love It Loud"	Simmons/Vincent	Kvikksølvguttene	3:19
15.	"God of Thunder"	Stanley	The Shirleys Temple	3:24
16.	"Tomorrow"	Stanley/Poncia	The 3856	3:08
17.	"Strange Ways"	Frehley	Ulver	4:19
18.	"C'mon and Love Me"	Stanley	Smalltown Rockets	2:49
19.	"The Magic KISS Medley"	Simmons/Stanley	Satin	5:08
20.	"Rock and Roll All Nite"	Simmons/Stanley	Erlend & Steinjo	3:11
