= Creatures of the Night (Kiss song) =

Single by Kiss

from the album Creatures of the Night
- Released: April 1983 (UK)
- Recorded: 1982 at Record Plant Studios, Los Angeles
- Genre: Heavy metal
- Length: 4:02
- Label: Casablanca
- Songwriter(s): Paul Stanley, Adam Mitchell
- Producer(s): Michael James Jackson, Gene Simmons, Paul Stanley

Kiss singles chronology
"Killer" / "I Love It Loud" (1982)	"Creatures of the Night" / "Rock and Roll All Nite (live)" (1983)	"Lick It Up" / "Dance All Over Your Face" (1983)

Music video
- Creatures of the Night on YouTube

"Creatures of the Night" is a song by American hard rock band Kiss, released as a single from their 1982 album of the same name. It was only released in the UK, where it reached #34. The song was written by Paul Stanley and Adam Mitchell in Mitchell's kitchen. It is not clear who plays what on the track but it is assumed that bass was not played by Gene Simmons, but Mike Porcaro who would soon join his brothers in the American rock band Toto. Lead guitar was not played by Ace Frehley as he was not musically involved with the album and it was not played by Vinnie Vincent either; it was played by Steve Farris, who would go on to become the lead guitarist of the 1980s pop rock group Mr. Mister. Song co-writer Adam Mitchell also played on the final version of the song, replacing Stanley on rhythm guitar in the middle and end of the song.

== Live performances ==
"Creatures of the Night" was performed during the Creatures of the Night Tour and Lick It Up Tour as an opening song and moved to the middle of the set on the Animalize Tour before being dropped from the set-list on the upcoming three tours and then again included in the set-list for the Revenge Tour and Kiss My Ass Tour, as an opening track, again.

== Appearances ==
"Creatures of the Night" has appeared on following Kiss albums:

- Creatures of the Night - original studio version (The 1985 reissue of the album contains a remixed version of the song, with more reverb.)
- Alive III - live version
- Chikara - remixed version
- The Box Set - remixed version
- The Best of Kiss, Volume 2: The Millennium Collection - studio version
- Kiss Rocks Vegas - live

"Creatures of the Night" cover:

- Iced Earth covered "Creatures of the Night" for their cover album Tribute to the Gods.
- Kefren's version is featured on their 1997 self-titled album.
- Depravity was the first band to cover "Creatures of the Night", in 1991 on a six track demo tape "Galvanizer".
- Saxorior covered "Creatures of the Night" for their 2008 album Völkerschlacht.

== Personnel ==
- Paul Stanley – lead vocals, rhythm guitar
- Eric Carr – drums, backing vocals
- Mike Porcaro – bass
- Steve Farris – lead guitar
- Adam Mitchell – additional guitar
- Gene Simmons – backing vocals

== Charts ==
Chart (1983)	Peak position
UK Singles (OCC)	34
