= Revenge Tour =

1992 concert tour by Kiss

- Tour by Kiss
- Poster to the concert in Colorado, USA
- Associated album: Revenge
- Start date: April 23, 1992
- End date: December 20, 1992
- Legs: 3
- No. of shows: 77

Kiss concert chronology
- Hot in the Shade Tour (1990); Revenge Tour (1992); Kiss My Ass Tour (1994–1995)

The Revenge Tour was a concert tour by Kiss in support of the band's studio album Revenge.

== Background ==
It was the first tour with drummer Eric Singer, replacing Eric Carr who died of cancer on November 24, 1991. Singer had previously performed with Paul Stanley's solo tour and was seen as a 'natural choice' according to Gene Simmons.

Kiss began the tour with a leg of club shows in North America. During the European leg of the tour in the United Kingdom, the stage set from the Hot in the Shade Tour was used. During the show at Cardiff National Ice Rink on May 20, 1992, a pyro cue for "Heaven's on Fire" caused £30,000 worth of damage to the ceiling.

For the North American arena tour, the stage featured a giant 41-foot high replica of the Statue of Liberty in front of a large Kiss logo wall. Halfway through the show during "War Machine", the statue's face crumbled to reveal its skull. Afterward, its right arm and torch crumbled down before its skeleton hand gave the finger, which some audiences took personally. The shows would also include strippers during the song "Take It Off". The stage was hauled by six to ten semi haulers while the replica of the Statue of Liberty had to fit into three trucks.

Due to poor ticket sales, the tour had to be shortened. There was a show set to take place in Spokane on December 13, but had been canceled due to weather affecting the band's travel between shows. The shows in Cleveland, Detroit and Indianapolis were recorded by Eddie Kramer for the Alive III live album.

In the tour program for the band's final tour, Simmons reflected on the tour:

"Unholy" was the first single from Revenge. I got the idea for "Unholy" from a song that Adam Mitchell wrote that Doro Pesch recorded called "Unholy Love". I just loved the word "unholy". Vinnie Vincent and I wrote the lyric together.

== Set lists ==
These are example set lists performed from one show on the tour, but may not represent the majority of the shows performed.

=== North American club and European legs ===
1. "Love Gun"
2. "Deuce"
3. "Heaven's on Fire"
4. "Parasite"
5. "Shout It Out Loud"
6. "Strutter"
7. "Calling Dr. Love"
8. "I Was Made For Lovin' You"
9. "Unholy"
10. "100,000 Years"
11. "Take It Off"
12. "God of Thunder"
13. "Lick It Up"
14. "Firehouse"
15. "Tears Are Falling"
16. "I Love It Loud"
17. "I Stole Your Love"
18. "Cold Gin"
19. "Detroit Rock City"
20. "I Want You"
21. "God Gave Rock 'n' Roll to You II"
22. "Rock And Roll All Nite"

=== North American arena leg ===
1. "Creatures of the Night"
2. "Deuce"
3. "I Just Wanna"
4. "Unholy"
5. "Parasite"
6. "Heaven's on Fire"
7. "Domino"
8. "Watchin' You"
9. "Hotter Than Hell"
10. "Firehouse"
11. "I Want You"
12. "Forever"
13. "War Machine"
14. "Rock and Roll All Nite"
15. "Lick It Up"
16. "Take It Off"
17. "Strutter"
18. "I Love It Loud"
19. "Detroit Rock City"
20. "Shout It Out Loud"
21. "God Gave Rock 'n' Roll to You II"
22. "Love Gun"
23. "Star Spangled Banner"

== Tour dates ==
| Date | City | Country | Venue | Opening act(s) |
North America
| April 23, 1992 | San Francisco | United States | The Stone | Shooting Gallery |
| April 25, 1992 | West Hollywood | United States | The Troubadour | Shooting Gallery |
| April 26, 1992 | West Hollywood | United States | The Troubadour | Shooting Gallery |
| April 27, 1992 | Phoenix | United States | After The Goldrush | Shooting Gallery |
| April 29, 1992 | Houston | United States | The Backstage | Shooting Gallery |
| April 30, 1992 | Dallas | United States | Dallas City Limits Club | Shooting Gallery |
| May 2, 1992 | Atlanta | United States | Center Stage | Shooting Gallery |
| May 4, 1992 | Baltimore | United States | Hammerjack's | Shooting Gallery |
| May 5, 1992 | Philadelphia | United States | Trocadero Theatre | Shooting Gallery |
| May 6, 1992 | Toronto | Canada | Phoenix Concert Theatre | Shooting Gallery |
| May 8, 1992 | Boston | United States | Avalon Ballroom | Shooting Gallery |
| May 9, 1992 | New York City | United States | The Ritz | Shooting Gallery |
| May 10, 1992 | Brooklyn | United States | The Warehouse | Shooting Gallery |
Europe
| May 16, 1992 | Glasgow | Scotland | S.E.C.C. Arena | Danger Danger |
| May 17, 1992 | Whitley Bay | England | Whitley Bay Ice Rink | Danger Danger |
| May 18, 1992 | Sheffield | England | Sheffield Arena | Danger Danger |
| May 20, 1992 | Cardiff | Wales | Wales National Ice Rink | Danger Danger |
| May 21, 1992 | London | England | Wembley Arena | Danger Danger |
| May 24, 1992 | Plymouth | England | Plymouth Pavilions | Danger Danger |
| May 25, 1992 | Birmingham | England | NEC Arena | Danger Danger |
| May 26, 1992 | Birmingham | England | NEC Arena | Danger Danger |
North America
| October 1, 1992 | Bethlehem | United States | Stabler Arena | Faster Pussycat; Trixter |
| October 2, 1992 | Binghamton | United States | Broome County Veterans Memorial Arena | Faster Pussycat; Trixter |
| October 3, 1992 | Toronto | Canada | Maple Leaf Gardens | Faster Pussycat; Trixter |
| October 5, 1992 | Montreal | Canada | Montreal Forum | Faster Pussycat; Trixter |
| October 6, 1992 | Portland | United States | Cumberland County Civic Center | Faster Pussycat; Trixter |
| October 8, 1992 | Worcester | United States | The Centrum | Faster Pussycat; Trixter |
| October 9, 1992 | East Rutherford | United States | Brendan Byrne Arena | Faster Pussycat; Trixter |
| October 10, 1992 | Philadelphia | United States | The Spectrum | Faster Pussycat; Trixter |
| October 11, 1992 | Uniondale | United States | Nassau Veterans Memorial Coliseum | Faster Pussycat; Trixter |
| October 13, 1992 | Hershey | United States | Hersheypark Arena | Faster Pussycat; Trixter |
| October 14, 1992 | Charleston | United States | Charleston Civic Center | Faster Pussycat; Trixter |
| October 16, 1992 | Pittsburgh | United States | Pittsburgh Civic Arena | Faster Pussycat; Trixter |
| October 17, 1992 | Roanoke | United States | Roanoke Civic Center | Faster Pussycat; Trixter |
| October 18, 1992 | Landover | United States | Capital Centre | Faster Pussycat; Trixter |
| October 20, 1992 | Lexington | United States | Rupp Arena | Faster Pussycat; Trixter |
| October 21, 1992 | Bristol | United States | Viking Hall Civic Center | Faster Pussycat; Trixter |
| October 23, 1992 | Charlotte | United States | Charlotte Coliseum | Faster Pussycat; Trixter |
| October 24, 1992 | Fayetteville | United States | Cumberland County Memorial Arena | Faster Pussycat; Trixter |
| October 25, 1992 | Columbia | United States | Carolina Coliseum | Faster Pussycat; Trixter |
| October 29, 1992 | Daytona Beach | United States | Ocean Center | Faster Pussycat; Trixter; Fortress |
| October 30, 1992 | Tampa | United States | USF Sun Dome | Faster Pussycat; Trixter |
| October 31, 1992 | Miami | United States | Miami Arena | Faster Pussycat; Trixter |
| November 3, 1992 | Greenville | United States | Greenville Memorial Auditorium | Jackyl; Trixter |
| November 5, 1992 | Atlanta | United States | The Omni | Great White; Trixter |
| November 6, 1992 | Nashville | United States | Nashville Municipal Auditorium | Great White; Trixter |
| November 7, 1992 | Knoxville | United States | Knoxville Civic Coliseum | Great White; Trixter |
| November 8, 1992 | Huntsville | United States | Von Braun Civic Center | Great White; Trixter |
| November 10, 1992 | St. Joseph | United States | St. Joseph Civic Arena | Great White; Trixter |
| November 13, 1992 | St. Louis | United States | St. Louis Arena | Great White; Trixter |
| November 14, 1992 | Ames | United States | Hilton Coliseum | Great White; Trixter |
| November 15, 1992 | Cedar Rapids | United States | Five Seasons Center | Great White; Trixter |
| November 17, 1992 | Kalamazoo | United States | Wings Stadium | Great White; Trixter |
| November 18, 1992 | Fort Wayne | United States | Allen County War Memorial Coliseum | Great White; Trixter |
| November 20, 1992 | Evansville | United States | Roberts Municipal Stadium | Great White; Trixter |
| November 21, 1992 | Chicago | United States | UIC Pavilion | Great White; Trixter |
| November 22, 1992 | Toledo | United States | Toledo Sports Arena | Great White; Trixter |
| November 24, 1992 | Springfield | United States | Prairie Capital Convention Center | Great White; Trixter |
| November 25, 1992 | Fairborn | United States | Ervin J. Nutter Center | Great White; Trixter |
| November 27, 1992 | Auburn Hills | United States | The Palace of Auburn Hills | Great White; Trixter |
| November 28, 1992 | Indianapolis | United States | Market Square Arena | Great White; Trixter |
| November 29, 1992 | Richfield | United States | Richfield Coliseum | Great White; Trixter |
| November 30, 1992 | Milwaukee | United States | Bradley Center | Great White; Trixter |
| December 2, 1992 | Madison | United States | Dane County Expo Coliseum | Great White; Trixter |
| December 3, 1992 | Saint Paul | United States | St. Paul Civic Center | Great White; Trixter |
| December 4, 1992 | Sioux Falls | United States | Sioux Falls Arena | Great White; Trixter |
| December 6, 1992 | Denver | United States | McNichols Sports Arena | Great White; Trixter |
| December 8, 1992 | Salt Lake City | United States | Delta Center | Great White; Trixter |
| December 9, 1992 | Boise | United States | BSU Pavilion | Great White; Trixter |
| December 10, 1992 | Portland | United States | Portland Memorial Coliseum | Great White; Trixter |
| December 11, 1992 | Vancouver | Canada | Pacific Coliseum | Great White; Trixter |
| December 14, 1992 | Seattle | United States | Seattle Center Arena | Great White; Trixter |
| December 16, 1992 | Sacramento | United States | ARCO Arena | Great White; Trixter |
| December 18, 1992 | Oakland | United States | Oakland-Alameda County Coliseum Arena | Great White; Trixter |
| December 19, 1992 | San Bernardino | United States | Orange Pavilion | Trixter; Vesuvius |
| December 20, 1992 | Phoenix | United States | America West Arena | Great White; Trixter |

== Personnel ==
- Paul Stanley – vocals, rhythm guitar
- Gene Simmons – vocals, bass
- Bruce Kulick – lead guitar, backing vocals
- Eric Singer – drums, backing vocals

Additional musician

- Derek Sherinian – keyboards
