= I Just Wanna (Kiss song) =

Single by Kiss

from the album Revenge
- A-side: "I Just Wanna"
- B-side: "I Just Wanna" (Radio Eq)
- Released: 1992
- Length: 4:07
- Label: Mercury (US)
- Songwriters: Paul Stanley, Vinnie Vincent
- Producer: Bob Ezrin

Kiss singles chronology
"Domino" (1992)	"I Just Wanna" (1992)	"Every Time I Look at You" (1992)

Music video
- "I Just Wanna" on YouTube

"I Just Wanna" is a song by the American rock band Kiss from their 1992 studio album Revenge. It was also released as the album's promotional single.

== Background and writing ==
"I Just Wanna" is the 11th track on the Kiss 1992 studio album Revenge.

The song was written by Paul Stanley and Vinnie Vincent. The latter also co-wrote two other songs on the album.

== Music video ==
The music video was directed by Paul Rachman, who was also the director of two more videos from Revenge: "Unholy" and "Domino". He recounted in an interview with Songfacts:

We had to do "I Just Wanna" while the band was on tour. We only had one day with them in London while they were touring, so I had to come up with an idea we could do in one day. It was a Paul Stanley song, and it was pop-y. The previous song ["Unholy"] was really, really dark — it was a dark void kind of atmosphere — so I went in the opposite direction. And that video was accomplishable to shoot in one day on a stage in London.

== Composition ==
In the chorus Stanley repeats "I just wanna f..." a couple of times until he finally completes the phrase "I just wanna forget you".

== Personnel ==
- Paul Stanley – lead vocals, rhythm guitar
- Bruce Kulick – lead guitar, EBow, backing vocals
- Eric Singer – drums, backing vocals
- Gene Simmons – bass, backing vocals

with

- Tommy Thayer – backing vocals
- Jesse Damon – backing vocals

== Charts ==
Chart (1992)	Peak position
US Mainstream Rock (Billboard)	34
