= Every Time I Look at You =

Single by Kiss

from the album Revenge
- B-side: "Partners in Crime"; "I Just Wanna" (CD maxi single)
- Released: 1992
- Genre: Glam metal
- Length: 4:38
- Label: Mercury (USA)
- Songwriters: Paul Stanley, Bob Ezrin
- Producer: Bob Ezrin

Kiss singles chronology
"I Just Wanna" (1992)	"Every Time I Look at You" (1992)	"I Love It Loud (Live)" (1992)

Music video
- "Every Time I Look at You" on YouTube

"Every Time I Look at You" is a song by the American rock band Kiss from their 1992 studio album Revenge. It became the album's final single.

== Background and writing ==
It was the ninth track on the band's 1992 studio album Revenge.

The song was written by Paul Stanley and Bob Ezrin,

== Composition ==
Brett Weiss' Encyclopedia of KISS notes that the song "Every Time I Look at You" "is further proof" to the fact that "with songs like 'Beth' and 'Forever' KISS can do powerballads with the best of them."

According to the same Encyclopedia of KISS, Dick Wagner, a "prolific musician", "who worked with such legendary acts as Lou Reed and Billy Joel, plays guitar on the song. It wasn't the first and only time he played on a Kiss recording, among other Kiss songs he played guitar on were "Beth", "Flaming Youth" and "Sweet Pain" (from the 1976 album Destroyer).

== Personnel ==
- Paul Stanley – lead and backing vocals, 12-string acoustic guitar
- Bruce Kulick – electric guitar, bass
- Eric Singer – drums, percussion

with

- Dick Wagner – guitar solo
- Bob Ezrin – keyboards, strings & horn arrangement

== Charts ==
Chart (1992)	Peak position
Sweden (Sverigetopplistan)	31
