= X-treme Close-Up =

Video by Kiss
- Released: July 14, 1992
- Recorded: Various
- Genre: Hard rock, heavy metal

Kiss chronology
Crazy Nights (1988)	X-treme Close-Up (1992)	Kiss Konfidential (1993)

X-treme Close Up features the history, facts and stories of American hard rock band Kiss, up to the time of filming in 1992. The video features vintage concert footage, interviews and videos from the early beginnings in the early 1970s to the early 1990s. It was released on July 14, 1992. It was certified Platinum in the US.

== Critical reception ==
AllMusic said X-treme Close-Up is "a much better compilation" than Exposed since it doesn't contain "unfunny skits". They also remarked that: "Every era of the band is touched upon [...] which makes X-Treme Close-Up a very consistent viewing experience, unlike Exposed."

== Track listing ==
No.	Title	Writer(s)	Length
1.	"Unholy" (video)	Gene Simmons, Vinnie Vincent
2.	"Sure Know Something" (video)	Paul Stanley, Vini Poncia
3.	"Watching You" (live, 1975)	Simmons
4.	"Black Diamond" (live, 1976)	Stanley
5.	"Cold Gin" (live, 1976)	Ace Frehley
6.	"Deuce" (live, 1976)	Simmons
7.	"100,000 Years" (live, 1976)	Stanley, Simmons
8.	"Let Me Go, Rock ‘n’ Roll" (live, 1976)	Stanley, Simmons
9.	"Beth" (live, 1977)	Peter Criss, Stan Penridge, Bob Ezrin
10.	"God of Thunder" (live, 1978)	Stanley
11.	"Black Diamond" (live, 1978)	Stanley
12.	"Love 'Em, Leave 'Em" (video)	Simmons
13.	"Hard Luck Woman" (video)	Stanley
14.	"I Stole Your Love" (live, 1978)	Stanley
15.	"I Was Made For Lovin' You" (video)	Stanley, Poncia, Desmond Child
16.	"A World Without Heroes" (video)	Stanley, Simmons, Ezrin, Lou Reed
17.	"Calling Dr. Love" (live, 1983)	Simmons
18.	"War Machine" (live, 1983)	Simmons, Bryan Adams, Jim Vallance
19.	"Lick it Up" (video)	Stanley, Vincent
20.	"Let’s Put the 'X' in Sex" (video)	Stanley, Child
21.	"Rise to It" (video)	Stanley, Bob Halligan, Jr
22.	"Hide Your Heart" (video)	Stanley, Child, Holly Knight
23.	"Forever" (video)	Stanley, Michael Bolton
24.	"I Just Wanna" (video)	Stanley, Vincent

== Certifications ==
Region	Certification	Certified units/sales
Canada (Music Canada)	Gold	5,000^{^}
United States (RIAA)	Platinum	100,000^{^}
^{^} Shipments figures based on certification alone.
