= Jungle (Kiss song) =

Single by Kiss

from the album Carnival of Souls: The Final Sessions
- A-side: "Jungle" (radio edit)
- B-side: "Jungle" (LP version)
- Released: 1997
- Genre: Grunge; hard rock; heavy metal
- Length: 6:49 (album version); 4:53 (single version)
- Label: Mercury
- Songwriter(s): Paul Stanley; Bruce Kulick; Curtis Cuomo
- Producer(s): Toby Wright; Gene Simmons; Paul Stanley

Kiss singles chronology
"Rock and Roll All Nite (Unplugged)" (1996)	"Jungle" (1997)	"Psycho Circus" (1998)

"Jungle" is a song by the American rock band Kiss from their 1997 studio album Carnival of Souls: The Final Sessions. It was also released as the album's promotional single and was later included on the 2014 compilation album Kiss 40, which featured a track from every Kiss album.

Although Kiss never performed the track live, it would be performed in later years by Bruce Kulick and Eric Singer as part of Eric Singer Project and was included on the ESP Live at the Marquee DVD.

== Background and composition ==
"Jungle" is the sixth track on the band's 1997 studio album Carnival of Souls: The Final Sessions. It was written by Paul Stanley together with Bruce Kulick and Curtis Cuomo.

With a running time of 6:49, "Jungle" is the longest song that Kiss has ever recorded on a studio album.

Brett Weiss' Encyclopedia of KISS says that the song has a "semi-funky grunge-lite riff" that "recalls Collective Soul's U.S. hit "Shine".

== Commercial performance ==
The song was a minor United States hit for the band, reaching number 8 on the Billboard Mainstream Rock Tracks chart despite a lack of promotion.

Chart (1997)	Peak position
US Mainstream Rock (Billboard)	8

== Awards ==
"Jungle" won the 1997 Metal Edge Readers' Choice Award for Song of the Year.

Year	Nominee / work	Award	Result
1997	"Jungle"	Metal Edge Readers' Choice Award for Song of the Year	Won

== Personnel ==
- Paul Stanley – lead and backing vocals
- Bruce Kulick – all guitars, bass
- Eric Singer – drums
