= Kiss My Ass: The Video =

Video by Kiss
- Released: 1994
- Recorded: Various
- Genre: Hard rock, heavy metal
- Length: 90 minutes
- Label: Universal
- Director: Mitchell Kanner

Kiss chronology
Kiss Konfidential (1993)	Kiss My Ass: The Video (1994)	Kiss Unplugged (1996)

Kiss My Ass: The Video, also known as Kiss My Ass: Classic Kiss Regrooved, is a long-form music video program released in 1994 on VHS and laserdisc by American hard rock band Kiss. The video includes clips from various live concerts and interviews with Paul Stanley and Gene Simmons. The DVD version was released in 2004.

== Reception ==
Kiss My Ass: The Video was certified Gold in the US.

== Track listing ==
No.	Title	Writer(s)	Length
1.	"Parasite" (live, 1975)	Ace Frehley
2.	"Do you Love Me" (live, 1977)	Paul Stanley, Kim Fowley, Bob Ezrin
3.	"Radioactive" (live, 1979)	Gene Simmons
4.	"Move On" (live, 1979)	Stanley, Mikel Japp
5.	"Love Gun" (live, 1992)	Stanley
6.	"New York Groove" (live, 1979)	Russ Ballard
7.	"She" (performed by Anthrax)	Simmons, Stephen Coronel
8.	"Makin’ Love" (live, 1977)	Stanley, Sean Delaney
9.	"Christine Sixteen" (performed by Gin Blossoms)	Simmons
10.	"I Love It Loud" (live, 1982)	Simmons, Vinnie Vincent
11.	"C’mon and Love Me" (live, 1976)	Stanley
12.	"Hooligan" (live, 1977)	Peter Criss, Stan Penridge
13.	"Shock Me" (live, 1977)	Frehley
14.	"I" (live, 1982)	Simmons, Ezrin
15.	"Take Me" (rehearsal, 1976)	Stanley, Delaney
16.	"She" (live, 1976)	Simmons, Stephen Coronel
17.	"Black Diamond" (live, 1976)	Stanley

== Certifications ==
Region	Certification	Certified units/sales
United States (RIAA)	Gold	50,000^{^}
^{^} Shipments figures based on certification alone.
