= Creatures of the Night =

- Cover photo by Bernard Vidal

Studio album by Kiss
- Released: October 25, 1982
- Studios: Record Plant (Los Angeles); Record One (Los Angeles); Mediasound (New York City)
- Genres: Heavy metal; hard rock
- Length: 38:47
- Label: Casablanca
- Producers: Michael James Jackson; Paul Stanley; Gene Simmons

Kiss chronology
Killers (1982)	Creatures of the Night (1982)	Lick It Up (1983)

Singles from Creatures of the Night
- 1. "I Love It Loud" Released: October 13, 1982; 2. "Killer" Released: November 1982; 3. "Creatures of the Night" Released: April 1983

Alternative cover
- 1985 reissue featuring then-new lead guitarist Bruce Kulick (bottom right)

Creatures of the Night is the tenth studio album by American rock band Kiss, released in 1982. It was the band's last for Casablanca Records, the only label for which Kiss had recorded up to that point. The album was dedicated to the memory of Casablanca founder and early Kiss supporter, Neil Bogart, who had died of cancer during the recording sessions. It is also the band's last album recorded with Ace Frehley, credited as an official member and their first album with Vinnie Vincent, as the initially uncredited lead guitarist. Vincent would later be credited but not featured on the cover of the 1985 reissue of the album. It was also Kiss's last album to feature the band with their trademark makeup until the release of Psycho Circus in 1998.

== Background ==
By 1982, Kiss's popularity in the US had plummeted due to changing musical tastes and their move away from the anthemic hard rock of their earlier material. 1979's Dynasty, while commercially successful, alienated many fans with the disco-flavored track "I Was Made for Lovin' You." 1980's Unmasked fell further into a power pop oriented sound and was Kiss's first album not to achieve platinum status since 1975's Dressed to Kill. The band did not even tour the U.S. for Unmasked, and it also soon faced its first lineup change: founding member Peter Criss, who had not participated in any of the Unmasked recording sessions, officially left Kiss in 1980 and was replaced by Eric Carr.

Fan hopes were raised in 1980 when Kiss announced that they were going to make their heaviest record yet. Instead, the band released Music from "The Elder" in late 1981, a concept album originally intended to complement a film called The Elder that was ultimately never made. Despite confidence from producer Bob Ezrin that this would recreate the success from 1976's Destroyer, the album did not improve the band's status, and on the contrary, further diminished Kiss' US fanbase, failed to achieve gold status, and having cancelled their U.S. Unmasked Tour just a short time before, the band then called off the planned tour for Music from "The Elder."

Kiss's label situation had changed as well. Casablanca Records founder Neil Bogart had sold the label to its distributor PolyGram in 1980, and went on to briefly form Boardwalk Records before being diagnosed with and later succumbing to cancer. Using a clause in their Casablanca contract that gave the band an option to leave the label if Bogart died, Kiss became free agents and signed a multimillion-dollar deal with Mercury Records. Mercury, a label also owned by PolyGram, reverted the band to their "old" label, though in name only.

== Composition and recording ==
The album represented a conscious effort by Kiss to return to the hard rock style that had helped them achieve commercial success with Destroyer (1976) and Love Gun (1977). The first key ingredient was songwriter/guitarist Vinnie Vincent, who was soon to replace Frehley as the band's new lead guitarist after being introduced to the band by album co-writer Adam Mitchell.

Musically, the progressive elements of Music from "The Elder" and the pop affectations of Dynasty and Unmasked were completely absent from Creatures of the Night, making it the heaviest album the group had made at that point. Paul Stanley called Kiss "a heavy metal band" in 1982. "I Still Love You", the only ballad on Creatures of the Night, was still heavier and darker than any ballad Kiss had released in earlier years. Also contributing to the heavy sound was Carr's drumming style, which was more similar to John Bonham's drumming than to Criss' jazz-influenced style. Creatures of the Night is the first Kiss album to have all lead vocal duties handled by either Gene Simmons or Stanley exclusively. All previous studio releases by the group contained at least one song with lead vocals by another band member.

The song "Rock and Roll Hell" is a rewrite of the song of the same title on the 1979 album Rock n' Roll Nights by Canadian band Bachman–Turner Overdrive, where the original version of this Simmons/Adams/Vallance song was credited to Jim Vallance only.

Kiss had used "ghost players" on previous albums, most notably Bob Kulick (Alive II and Killers) and Dick Wagner (Destroyer), but Vincent handled most of the lead guitar as a session player and co-writer before being added as the full-time replacement for Frehley, though as an employee and not a full member (like Carr). Blues guitarist Robben Ford, a friend of the album's producer Michael James Jackson, contributed two solos in what he described as one of his weirdest gigs. Mr. Mister guitarist Steve Farris (who was considered as a replacement for Frehley but was thought to not have "the right look") provided the solo and lead fills to the title track. Co-writer Mitchell also contributed guitar work to the title track. In a 2026 interview, Steve Farris revealed that he lost the KISS gig because he couldn't sing. Though often given credit for playing the solos on "Keep Me Comin'" and "Danger", Kulick admitted in a 2011 interview that none of the studio work he did on Creatures of the Night made it to the album; this confirmed the same from an earlier Mitchell interview. Jimmy Haslip (former member of Blackjack, Tommy Bolin Band and Street Punk) declared in 2008 that he was invited by James Jackson to record five songs (Simmons allegedly refused to play his bass parts due to the end of his relationship with Diana Ross), but Haslip only confirmed that he recorded "Danger."

Though Ace Frehley did not play on the album, his face was still featured on the album cover for contractual and commercial reasons. Frehley had been pushing the band to do a heavy rock record since Dynasty, and by the time of Creatures of the Night, he was fully disillusioned with the band; alcoholism and a prescription medicine dependency (begun after a car wreck) led to him not participating in the recording sessions. In fact, when recording sessions for Creatures of the Night began in July 1982, Kiss was essentially a trio. It was only after the album was released and a short promotional tour of Europe was completed that Frehley officially left Kiss. The lead guitar replacement for Frehley for the Creatures of the Night Tour/10th Anniversary Tour in the U.S. was Vincent, adopting his Egyptian Ankh makeup, hastily designed by Stanley.

Speaking to Record Mirror in 1982, Stanley explained the album title as "Basically, we feel that everybody is a creature of the night. We're all less inhibited and we're all vampires. The night makes people feel free and then by the cold light of dawn we crawl home to our coffins to behave like normal people during the day."

== Artwork ==
It has been speculated that the original 1982 cover was modeled after the 1979 children's book, I Can Read About Creatures of the Night.

Three official variations on the album artwork exist: the 1982 original issue; the 1985 reissue, featuring Stanley, Carr, Gene Simmons, and then-current guitarist Bruce Kulick—who did not play on the album—all without make-up; and the 1997 remastered version (same photo as the original, but with minor variations in the logo and lettering). There is also a bootlegged LP that claims to be a Brazilian promo version that features Vincent in make-up airbrushed over Frehley.

== Promotion ==
The band released a video for "I Love It Loud," which received moderate airplay on MTV. In it was a stage set up that featured Carr's drum kit as a giant metallic tank with an exploding turret. Flames and explosions were also in abundance. Frehley did appear in the video as the rhythm guitarist, with Stanley shown playing the seven-note solo.

The album is the band's most represented of their 1980s material over the course of their career in their live setlists by a wide margin and it is their fourth most represented album overall. "I Love It Loud" is a setlist staple performed at nearly all of their shows, with over 1500 performances, and "War Machine" has also been played on most of their tours, having been performed over 900 times. In addition, the album's title track and "I Still Love You" have both been performed over 300 times each.

== Reception ==
Professional ratings
Review scores
Source	Rating
AllMusic	4/5 stars
Collector's Guide to Heavy Metal	7/10
Encyclopedia of Popular Music	2/5 stars
Pitchfork	1.5/10
The Rolling Stone Album Guide	1/5 stars
Uncut	3/5 stars

Despite positive reviews, the album did not return the band to the commercial success they had held five years prior. Despite charting higher than The Elder (No. 45, compared to The Elder's No. 75), Creatures of the Night would not attain gold status until 1994. The album would receive critical recognition, with both Kerrang! and Guitar World magazines placing it at No. 5 on their end-of-year lists of 1982. In 2022, Creatures of the Night was named No. 4 of 'The 25 greatest rock guitar albums of 1982' list in Guitar World.

Carr noted in an interview that Creatures of the Night was his favorite Kiss record on which he played.

Creatures of the Night was certified gold by the RIAA on May 9, 1994. It was certified gold in Brazil in 1983 for sales of 100,000 copies.

In 2022, a super deluxe edition of the album was released in multiple configurations on CD, vinyl and streaming. The most extensive, a five CD + Blu-ray audio disc, features a total of 103 songs including a new remastered version of the album, 2 discs of demos and studio outtakes (including all 4 new songs from Killers and 3 unreleased songs from the Elder-era Penny Lane session), and 2 discs of live soundboard recordings from the 1982-83 tour for the album. The first single from this re-release was the song Betrayed, a re-working of a Vinnie Vincent demo from his earlier band Warrior with new lyrics and vocals by Paul Stanley.

== Track listing ==
All credits adapted from the original release.

Side one
No.	Title	Writer(s)	Lead vocals	Length
1.	"Creatures of the Night"	Paul Stanley, Adam Mitchell	Stanley	4:02
2.	"Saint and Sinner"	Gene Simmons, Mikel Japp	Simmons	4:50
3.	"Keep Me Comin'"	Stanley, Mitchell	Stanley	3:55
4.	"Rock and Roll Hell"	Simmons, Bryan Adams, Jim Vallance	Simmons	4:11
5.	"Danger"	Stanley, Mitchell	Stanley	3:54

Side two
No.	Title	Writer(s)	Lead vocals	Length
6.	"I Love It Loud"	Simmons, Vinnie Vincent	Simmons	4:15
7.	"I Still Love You"	Stanley, Vincent	Stanley	6:06
8.	"Killer"	Simmons, Vincent	Simmons	3:19
9.	"War Machine"	Simmons, Adams, Vallance	Simmons	4:14
Total length:				38:47

== Personnel ==
Kiss

- Paul Stanley – vocals and rhythm guitar on tracks 1, 3, 5 & 7
- Gene Simmons – vocals, bass (except tracks 1, 5 & 7), rhythm guitar on "War Machine"
- Eric Carr – drums, percussion, bass on "I Still Love You", backing vocals
- Ace Frehley – lead guitar (credited, but does not play)

Additional musicians

- Vinnie Vincent – lead guitar on tracks 3, 5 & 9; all guitars on tracks 2, 6 & 8
- Robben Ford – lead guitar on "I Still Love You"; all guitars on "Rock and Roll Hell"
- Steve Farris – lead guitar on "Creatures of the Night"
- Jimmy Haslip – bass on "Danger"
- Mike Porcaro – bass on "Creatures of the Night"
- Adam Mitchell – additional guitar and end lick on "Creatures of the Night"
- Dave Wittman – backing vocals on "I Love It Loud"

Production

- Michael James Jackson, Paul Stanley, Gene Simmons – producers
- Dave Wittman – engineer
- Kevin Eddy – assistant engineer, additional recording
- Niko Bolas – drum recording
- Rich Bosworth – drum recording assistant
- Michael Barbiero – drum recording on "Keep Me Comin'"
- Ricky Delano, David Bianco – additional recording
- Bob Clearmountain – mixing at Power Station, New York City
- George Marino – mastering at Sterling Sound, New York City
- Bernard Vidal – cover photography
- Howard Marks Advertising – design

== Charts ==
1982 weekly chart performance for Creatures of the Night
Chart (1982)	Peak position
Australian Albums (Kent Music Report)	33
Dutch Albums (Album Top 100)	34
German Albums (Offizielle Top 100)	42
Italian Albums (Musica e Dischi)	25
Japanese Albums (Oricon)	39
Norwegian Albums (VG-lista)	31
Swedish Albums (Sverigetopplistan)	22
UK Albums (Official Charts)	22
US Billboard 200	45

2022 weekly chart performance for Creatures of the Night 40th anniversary edition
Chart (2022)	Peak position
Austrian Albums (Ö3 Austria)	75
Belgian Albums (Ultratop Flanders)	155
Belgian Albums (Ultratop Wallonia)	103
Hungarian Albums (MAHASZ)	38
Japanese Albums (Oricon)	40
Japanese Hot Albums (Billboard Japan)	47
Scottish Albums (Official Charts)	48
Swedish Albums (Sverigetopplistan)	43
Swiss Albums (Schweizer Hitparade)	35

== Certifications and sales ==
Certifications and sales for Creatures of the Night
Region	Certification	Certified units/sales
Brazil	—	120,000
United States (RIAA)	Gold	500,000^{^}
^{^} Shipments figures based on certification alone.

== Release history ==
- Casablanca NBLP-7270: LP
- Casablanca NBLS-7270: Cassette
- Casablanca NBL8-7270: 8-track
