= Carnival of Souls: The Final Sessions =

1997 studio album by Kiss

Studio album by Kiss
- Released: October 28, 1997
- Recorded: November 1995 – February 1996
- Studios: Music Grinder, Hollywood, California
- Genres: Heavy metal; grunge
- Length: 60:11
- Label: Mercury
- Producers: Toby Wright; Gene Simmons; Paul Stanley

Kiss chronology
Greatest Kiss (1997)	Carnival of Souls: The Final Sessions (1997)	Psycho Circus (1998)

Singles from Carnival of Souls: The Final Sessions
- 1. "Jungle" Released: 1997

Carnival of Souls: The Final Sessions (also simply known as Carnival of Souls) is the seventeenth studio album by American rock band Kiss, released in 1997. It is the band's final album with lead guitarist Bruce Kulick (though he appeared on the band's following album Psycho Circus as a session musician), and their last album with drummer Eric Singer until 2009's Sonic Boom. The album is a departure from the band's classic hard rock style, favoring a dark and dense grunge-oriented sound. It is also the band's last album of their unmasked era. There was no supporting tour for this album.

== Overview ==
The album was recorded between late 1995 and early 1996, but Kiss cancelled its release after committing to a reunion tour with the band's original lineup. Bootleg copies were circulated by fans, prompting the band to officially release the material in 1997 under the title Carnival of Souls: The Final Sessions. According to guitarist Bruce Kulick, the bootleg versions in distribution lacked songs that were part of the official release. There was no accompanying tour to support the album, and none of the songs on Carnival of Souls have ever been performed live by Kiss, though the album's closing track "I Walk Alone" has occasionally been performed live by Eric Singer and Kulick in the Eric Singer Project. "Jungle" and "I Walk Alone" were also performed live by Kulick's former band, Union.

Two former members of the band Black 'N Blue co-wrote songs on Carnival of Souls; vocalist Jaime St. James co-wrote "In My Head", and guitarist Tommy Thayer collaborated on "Childhood's End". Thayer would join Kiss as the band's permanent lead guitarist in 2002. Bruce Kulick provides his first and only lead vocal with the band on "I Walk Alone". Carnival of Souls is the band's longest album at 60 minutes and 11 seconds.

== Reception ==
Professional ratings
Review scores
Source	Rating
AllMusic	2/5 stars
Collector's Guide to Heavy Metal	8/10
Encyclopedia of Popular Music	2/5 stars
Metal Rules	4.0/5
NME	1/10 stars
Rock Hard	8.0/10

Guitarist Bruce Kulick wrote on his official website that Carnival of Souls had "people equally vocal about it being their favorite Kiss CD or thinking it's the worst Kiss album ever". NME described it as "totally unlistenable bollocks."

The album reached No. 27 on the US Billboard 200 chart and the only single released from the album, "Jungle", made No. 8 on the US Mainstream Rock chart. No music video was made to promote the single, which later won a 1997 Metal Edge Readers' Choice Award for Song of the Year.

== Track listing ==
No.	Title	Writer(s)	Lead vocals	Length
1.	"Hate"	Gene Simmons, Scott Van Zen, Bruce Kulick	Simmons	4:36
2.	"Rain"	Paul Stanley, Kulick, Curtis Cuomo	Stanley	4:46
3.	"Master & Slave"	Stanley, Kulick, Cuomo	Stanley	4:57
4.	"Childhood's End"	Simmons, Tommy Thayer, Kulick	Simmons	4:20
5.	"I Will Be There"	Stanley, Kulick, Cuomo	Stanley	3:49
6.	"Jungle"	Stanley, Kulick, Cuomo	Stanley	6:49
7.	"In My Head"	Simmons, Van Zen, Jaime St. James	Simmons	4:00
8.	"It Never Goes Away"	Stanley, Kulick, Cuomo	Stanley	5:42
9.	"Seduction of the Innocent"	Simmons, Van Zen	Simmons	5:16
10.	"I Confess"	Simmons, Ken Tamplin	Simmons	5:23
11.	"In the Mirror"	Stanley, Kulick, Cuomo	Stanley	4:26
12.	"I Walk Alone"	Simmons, Kulick	Kulick	6:07

== Personnel ==
Kiss

- Paul Stanley – vocals (lead on 2, 3, 5, 6, 8, 11), rhythm guitar, 12-string acoustic guitar and ukulele on track 5, co-producer
- Gene Simmons – vocals (lead on 1, 4, 7, 9, 10), bass except on tracks 2, 5, 6, 8 & 11, co-producer
- Bruce Kulick – vocals (lead on 12), lead guitar; all guitars on tracks 7, 9 and 10, bass and acoustic guitar solo on track 5, all guitars and bass on tracks 2, 6, 8 and 11
- Eric Singer – drums, percussion, backing vocals

Additional musicians

- Carole Keiser – choir management on track 4, string arrangement on tracks 5 and 10
- The Crossroads Boys Choir – backing vocals on track 4
- Nick Simmons – backing vocals on track 4

Technical personnel

- Toby Wright – co-producer, engineer, mixing
- David Bryant – assistant engineer
- Stephen Marcussen – mastering at Precision Mastering, Hollywood

== Charts ==
Chart (1997)	Peak position
Austrian Albums (Ö3 Austria)	37
Canada Top Albums/CDs (RPM)	32
Dutch Albums (Album Top 100)	66
European Albums Charts	84
Finnish Albums (Suomen virallinen lista)	17
German Albums (Offizielle Top 100)	36
Norwegian Albums (VG-lista)	23
Swedish Albums (Sverigetopplistan)	29
UK Rock & Metal Albums (Official Charts)	9
US Billboard 200	27
