= Lick It Up (song) =

Single by Kiss

from the album Lick It Up
- Released: September 18, 1983
- Recorded: 1983
- Studio: Right Track Studios, New York City
- Genre: Glam metal; pop metal; hard rock
- Length: 3:56
- Label: Mercury
- Songwriters: Paul Stanley, Vinnie Vincent
- Producers: Michael James Jackson, Paul Stanley, Gene Simmons

Kiss singles chronology
"I Love It Loud" / "Danger" (1982)	"Lick It Up" / "Dance All Over Your Face" (1983)	"All Hell's Breakin' Loose" / "Young and Wasted" (1984)

Audio sample
- "Lick It Up": file; help

Music video
- "Lick It Up" on YouTube

"Lick It Up" is a song by the American rock band Kiss. The title track to the group's 1983 album of the same name, it was released as the album's first single. Musicians Paul Stanley and Vinnie Vincent composed the song. It was a Top 40 hit in the United Kingdom, although it failed to chart as highly in the band's native U.S.

"Lick It Up" has been staple of the band's live performances. Due to its popularity among fans, Kiss has performed the song over 1,500 times as of December 2024, making it one of the group's top ten most-played pieces.

== Song information ==
A video was made to promote the single. It was the first music clip to feature the band without its makeup. The video premiered on MTV on September 18, 1983, in a half-hour special hosted by J. J. Jackson. Despite the hype and promotion for the single, it stalled at #66 on the American Billboard Hot 100. However, the song broke into the Top 40 in several other countries.

Kiss has performed "Lick It Up" on most of its tours since the single's release. The track was featured on the group's live albums Alive III and Kiss Symphony: Alive IV. It also appears on 2001's The Box Set. While a few others have been played in limited to rare occasions over the years, it is the only song from the band's unmasked era that has been regularly played live as a setlist staple since they returned to wearing their trademark makeup in 1996.

== Reception ==
The American trade publication Cash Box stated that "high lead and backup vocals over a slowly throbbing guitar and drum rhythm set up an instructive lesson in feeling good." The single was named as one of the journal's 'Feature Picks'.

== Personnel ==
Kiss

- Paul Stanley – lead vocals, rhythm guitar
- Gene Simmons – bass guitar, backing vocals
- Eric Carr – drums, percussion, backing vocals
- Vinnie Vincent – lead guitar, additional vocals

== Charts ==
Chart (1983–1984)	Peak position
Argentina Singles (CAPIF)	4
Australian Singles (Kent Music Report)	82
Canada Top Singles (RPM)	32
French Singles (IFOP)	58
Switzerland (Schweizer Hitparade)	24
UK Singles (Official Charts)	31
US Billboard Hot 100	66

== In popular culture ==
- The song is featured in the TV series The Sopranos.
- It is also featured in the video game Grand Theft Auto: Vice City Stories, on the V-Rock radio station.
- The Kiss Symphony version appears in the video game Tony Hawk's Underground.
- The studio version of the song appears in the TV series "Family Guy" during the episode "Girl, Internetted". In particular, this use is a running gag through the episode, including a scene where character Brian claims his Hummer he is temporarily driving is so manly the radio plays only this song repeatedly- and indeed, when he tries to change to a different station, it merely switches to a different portion of the song. It also crosses over with another running gag of the episode when Brian and Stewie use an option where Sam Elliott briefly narrates the lyrics at the end.
- The studio version of the song appears in the 2001 film Rock Star.
- The studio version of the song appears in the 2022 film Bones and All.

== See also ==
- 1983 in music
- Glam metal music
- Hard rock music
- Kiss discography
