= Domino (Kiss song) =

Single by Kiss

from the album Revenge
- B-side: "Carr Jam 1981"
- Released: 1992
- Genre: Hard rock; blues rock
- Length: 4:01
- Label: Mercury
- Songwriter(s): Gene Simmons
- Producer(s): Bob Ezrin

Kiss singles chronology
"Unholy" / "God Gave Rock 'N' Roll to You II" (1992)	"Domino" (1992)	"I Just Wanna" (Radio EQ) / "I Just Wanna" (1992)

Music video
- "Domino" on YouTube

"Domino" is a song by the American hard rock band Kiss, released on the band's sixteenth studio album, Revenge, in 1992. The song was written by the band's bassist, Gene Simmons, and it borrows elements from the song "Nasty Nasty", which Simmons had co-written and produced in 1986 with the band Black 'n Blue. The song was released as a single in 1992, with the album's instrumental, "Carr Jam 1981", as its B-side. Despite being performed on only two tours and during their MTV Unplugged appearance, "Domino" has appeared on several of the band's albums.

== Composition ==
Gene Simmons, the sole writer of the song, admitted he was trying to copy his song "Deuce" when composing "Domino", although the song borrows much more from the song "Nasty Nasty" by the band Black 'n Blue. "Nasty Nasty" was written by Simmons, Tommy Thayer and Jaime St. James, while "Domino" is credited to Simmons only.

Simmons said about the creation of the song: "This song started out with a bass lick, much as 'Deuce' did. Once I had the meter down, I started writing rhyming words, but without a melody – so it was almost a rap. Then I talked the song through with the lick, and the melody just came naturally. The melody that came to me was the bass lick, so I just shadowed my melody with the lick on guitar."

The song was demoed by Simmons and the band Silent Rage, whom Simmons had signed to his label $immons Records (sic). The demo version differs from the studio version in its verses, as the verse in the demo is:

Here's an introduction, her name is Domino
Never had confession, if you really wanna know

In the studio version, the verse is:

Never had confession, never had a home
Never had no worry, until I met Domino

The key of the solo was changed by Bob Ezrin to provide "more energy".

== Promotion ==
"Domino" was released as the third single from the Revenge album in 1992. The song only managed to chart on the Billboard Mainstream Rock Tracks chart, reaching number 26.

A music video was directed by Paul Rachman and shows Simmons driving around Hollywood eating fast food, while the other band members are in the studio playing. The video was, like other videos from Revenge, ignored by MTV in favor of grunge bands. The video features Paul Stanley playing a Gene Simmons Punisher bass.

== Live performances ==
"Domino" was played only on the Revenge Tour and Kiss My Ass Tour, but was also performed for the band's MTV Unplugged appearance. Because of the original line-up reunion, all post-'70s songs were excluded from the setlist. As years went by, some post-'70s songs returned to the setlist, although "Domino" wasn't one of them.

== Other appearances ==
"Domino" has appeared on the following Kiss albums:

- Revenge – studio version
- Alive III – live version
- Kiss Unplugged – acoustic live version
- The Box Set – demo version
- The Best of Kiss, Volume 3: The Millennium Collection – Alive III version
- Kiss Alive! 1975–2000 – Alive III version

== Personnel ==
- Gene Simmons – lead & backing vocals, bass
- Bruce Kulick – lead & rhythm guitar
- Eric Singer – drums

== Charts ==
Chart (1992)	Peak position
US Mainstream Rock (Billboard)	26
