= Kiss Unplugged =

1996 live album by Kiss

Live album by Kiss
- Released: March 12, 1996
- Recorded: August 9, 1995
- Venues: Sony Music Studios, New York City, New York
- Genres: Hard rock, acoustic rock
- Length: 56:07
- Label: Mercury
- Producer: Alex Coletti

Kiss chronology
Alive III (1993)	Kiss Unplugged (1996)	You Wanted the Best, You Got the Best!! (1996)

Singles from Kiss Unplugged
- 1. "Rock and Roll All Nite" Released: 1996

Kiss Unplugged

Video by Kiss
- Released: March 12, 1996
- Recorded: August 9, 1995
- Venues: Sony Music Studios, New York City, New York
- Genres: Hard rock, acoustic rock
- Length: 85 min.
- Label: PolyGram Video
- Director: Joe Perota
- Producer: Alex Coletti

Kiss chronology
Kiss My Ass: The Video (1994)	Kiss Unplugged (1996)	Psycho Circus 3-D Video (1998)

Kiss Unplugged is the fourth live album by the American rock band Kiss, released in 1996. It was recorded in studio for the television program MTV Unplugged and released as part of a series of live and video albums.

== Overview ==
On August 9, 1995, the band performed at Sony Music Studios in New York City for the TV show MTV Unplugged. Paul Stanley and Gene Simmons contacted former members Peter Criss and Ace Frehley and invited them to participate. It marked the only time the original lineup performed publicly without their trademark makeup and was also the only time Frehley and Criss shared a stage with Eric Singer and Bruce Kulick. It was the first time Singer had part of a lead vocal on an album (shared with Criss on "Nothin' to Lose").

Fan reaction to Criss and Frehley at the show was so positive that, in 1996, the original lineup of Kiss reunited, with all four original members together for the first time since 1979.

"The sound was deafening: the sound of rock 'n' roll history coming full circle in a TV studio", wrote Kerrang!'s Don Kaye in a review of the taping at New York's Sony Music Studios. "Complete pandemonium ensued as they struck the opening chords to '2,000 Man', and it continued when Ace's voice rang out in the clear, sardonic manner we all know and love."

== Release ==
On March 12, 1996, the concert was released on CD. The LP version of the album includes a poster and some were pressed on yellow marbled vinyl.

A stand-alone VHS and DVD documentary were produced around the same time as the CD release, with archival footage of the band's rehearsal sessions at SIR Studios in New York. It also shows the first "KISS Konvention" appearance earlier in the year, with Criss joining the touring members on stage to sing a few tunes. According to Criss, this invite gave Simmons the idea of reaching out to both him and Frehley to be a part of the Unplugged taping in an unannounced reunion.

On December 18, 2007, the performance appeared as part of the Kissology Volume Three: 1992–2000 DVD set. This included the original DVD release of the concert plus five previously unreleased songs: "Hard Luck Woman" (with Stanley on vocals), "Heaven's on Fire", "Spit" (mostly sung by the audience), "C'mon and Love Me", and a country version of "God of Thunder". An overseas release of the album on two DVDs features outtakes from the show that were edited out of every other release, such as Gene forgetting the lyrics to a song or Paul breaking a string on his guitar in the middle of a song, plus some banter between the band and the audience while they were changing the stage for Ace and Peter to come out. "Got To Choose" also appeared much earlier in the album, right after "Domino".

== Reception ==
Professional ratings
Review scores
Source	Rating
AllMusic	3/5 stars
Collector's Guide to Heavy Metal	7/10
Encyclopedia of Popular Music	3/5 stars
Entertainment Weekly	A
Melodic	4.5/5 stars
Q	3/5 stars
Rock Hard	6.0/10
The Rolling Stone Album Guide	1/5 stars

Contemporary reviews were mixed. Rolling Stone defined the show as "one of the most pointless MTV Unplugged segments imaginable," while Rock Hard called Unplugged "the weakest output of the entire KISStory," saved only by a few classic songs. On the other hand, Danny Eccleston in Q observed that "cheatingly, the ambience is muscularly electro-acoustic, but the tunes happily hail from the classic slap period, throwing the simply great pop of 'Goin' Blind' and the Beatley 'Sure Know Something' into pin-sharp focus."

Retrospective reviews were more positive. AllMusic reviewer stated that the musicians "exceeded expectations and, given their newfound energy, charisma, and love for the music, their performance provided the catalyst for the beginning of a successful world reunion tour." Canadian journalist Martin Popoff remarked how many tracks "sound campfire comfy done this way, the unplugged format exposing the no-brains all-heart pop craft of these songs".

== Track listing ==
No.	Title	Writer(s)	Lead vocals	Length
1.	"Comin' Home"	Ace Frehley, Paul Stanley	Stanley	2:51
2.	"Plaster Caster"	Gene Simmons	Simmons	3:17
3.	"Goin' Blind"	Simmons, Stephen Coronel	Simmons	3:37
4.	"Do You Love Me?"	Stanley, Bob Ezrin, Kim Fowley	Stanley	3:13
5.	"Domino"	Simmons	Simmons	3:46
6.	"Sure Know Something"	Stanley, Vini Poncia	Stanley	4:14
7.	"A World Without Heroes"	Stanley, Simmons, Ezrin, Lou Reed	Simmons	2:57
8.	"Rock Bottom"	Frehley, Stanley	Stanley	3:20
9.	"See You Tonite"	Simmons	Simmons	2:26
10.	"I Still Love You"	Stanley, Vinnie Vincent	Stanley	6:09
11.	"Every Time I Look at You"	Stanley, Ezrin	Stanley	4:43
12.	"2,000 Man" (The Rolling Stones cover)	Mick Jagger, Keith Richards	Frehley	5:12
13.	"Beth"	Peter Criss, Ezrin, Stan Penridge	Criss	2:50
14.	"Nothin' to Lose"	Simmons	Eric Singer, Criss	3:42
15.	"Rock and Roll All Nite"	Stanley, Simmons	Simmons, Frehley, Criss	4:20
16.	"Got to Choose" (Japanese release)	Stanley	Stanley	4:01

== Personnel ==
Kiss

- Paul Stanley – acoustic guitar, lead and backing vocals
- Gene Simmons – acoustic bass guitar, lead and backing vocals
- Bruce Kulick – acoustic guitar (all tracks except 12–13)
- Eric Singer – drums (all tracks except 12–13), lead vocals (14)

Additional musicians

- Ace Frehley – acoustic guitar (12–15), lead vocals (12, 15), backing vocals (14–15)
- Peter Criss – drums (12, 14–15), lead vocals (13–15), backing vocals (14–15)
- Phillip Ashley – piano on "Every Time I Look at You"
- Jon Grindstaff – conductor, string arrangements on "Every Time I Look at You"

Production

- Alex Coletti – producer
- Joe Perota – director
- Randy Ezratty – engineer
- James 'Jimbo' Barton – mixing
- Ralph Patlan, Tat – mastering at Precision Mastering, Hollywood
- Stephen Marcussen, Don C. Tyler – mastering assistants
- Susan McEowen – design
- Tim Rozner, Tommy Thayer – production coordinators

== Charts ==
Chart (1996)	Peak position
Australian Albums (ARIA)	4
Austrian Albums (Ö3 Austria)	16
Canada Top Albums/CDs (RPM)	20
Dutch Albums (Album Top 100)	32
Finnish Albums (Suomen virallinen lista)	18
German Albums (Offizielle Top 100)	47
Japanese Albums (Oricon)	60
Norwegian Albums (VG-lista)	9
Scottish Albums (Official Charts)	96
Swedish Albums (Sverigetopplistan)	5
Swiss Albums (Schweizer Hitparade)	35
UK Albums (Official Charts)	74
UK Rock & Metal Albums (Official Charts)	7
US Billboard 200	15

== Certifications ==
Region	Certification	Certified units/sales
Argentina (CAPIF)	Gold	30,000^{^}
United States (RIAA)	Gold	500,000^{^}
United States (RIAA) Video	Gold	50,000^{^}
^{^} Shipments figures based on certification alone.
