= Alive III =

Live album by Kiss
- Released: May 18, 1993
- Recorded: November 27–29, 1992
- Venues: Cleveland, Detroit, and Market Square Arena, Indianapolis
- Genres: Hard rock, heavy metal
- Length: 66:53
- Label: Mercury
- Producers: Kiss, Eddie Kramer

Kiss chronology
Revenge (1992)	Alive III (1993)	Kiss Unplugged (1996)

Singles from Alive III
- 1. "I Love It Loud" Released: May 8, 1993

Alive III is the third live album released by the American hard rock band Kiss in 1993. The recording of Alive III took place over multiple dates (in Cleveland, Detroit and Indianapolis) during the band's 1992 tour in support of Revenge. It was certified gold in 1994.

== Background ==
Alive III was the first live album the band had released since 1977's Alive II, and the first live recordings released since 1984's Animalize Live Uncensored concert film. The recording of "I Was Made for Lovin' You" was actually recorded at one of the band's soundchecks, but an audience was overdubbed onto the song to make it appear "live".

The album is the first Kiss live album released during the group's non-makeup era, followed by Kiss Unplugged in 1996. During the recording of Alive II, Kiss did not want to duplicate songs from Alive!, although some songs in Alive III are duplicate songs from their previous live albums, such as "Rock and Roll All Nite". It is also the first Kiss live album to feature a different lineup to the previous two, which featured the original lineup.

The liner notes of Alive III include a family tree showing the various Kiss lineups from 1973 to 1993, as well as bands that the then-current and former members of Kiss were in. It was designed by the band's Japanese fan club. Tony Iommi of Black Sabbath (for whom Eric Singer drummed in 1986–87) is misnamed Tommy. The notes also mistakenly claim that "Watchin' You" is from Kiss, and "I Was Made for Lovin' You" from Dressed to Kill. The re-release of Alive III (as part of the Kiss Alive! 1975–2000 box set) contains an additional track, "Take It Off", matching the original international CD and US vinyl versions of the album.

== Reception ==
Professional ratings
Review scores
Source	Rating
AllMusic	2/5 stars
Collector's Guide to Heavy Metal	7/10
Encyclopedia of Popular Music	2/5 stars
Entertainment Weekly	B
Q	3/5 stars
Rock Hard	7.0/10
The Rolling Stone Album Guide	2/5 stars

"Canny power-pop gave a merciless headbanging", decided Jeremy Clarke in Q. Kerrang! magazine listed Alive III as eleventh best album of 1993.

Bruce Kulick's climactic version of "The Star-Spangled Banner" was ranked seventh on the Ultimate Classic Rock list "Top 10 National Anthem Guitar Solos", before Ace Frehley's version and after Joe Satriani's.

Alive III was certified Gold by the RIAA on October 27, 1994.

== Track listing ==
All credits adapted from the original release.

No.	Title	Writer(s)	Lead vocals	Length
1.	"Creatures of the Night"	Paul Stanley, Adam Mitchell	Paul Stanley	4:40
2.	"Deuce"	Gene Simmons	Gene Simmons	3:43
3.	"I Just Wanna"	Stanley, Vinnie Vincent	Stanley	4:24
4.	"Unholy"	Simmons, Vincent	Simmons	3:27
5.	"Heaven's on Fire"	Stanley, Desmond Child	Stanley	4:15
6.	"Watchin' You"	Simmons	Simmons	3:35
7.	"Domino"	Simmons	Simmons	3:47
8.	"I Was Made for Lovin' You"	Stanley, Child, Vini Poncia	Stanley	4:32
9.	"I Still Love You"	Stanley, Vincent	Stanley	6:03
10.	"Rock and Roll All Nite"	Stanley, Simmons	Simmons	3:32
11.	"Lick It Up"	Stanley, Vincent	Stanley	4:18
12.	"Forever"	Stanley, Michael Bolton	Stanley	3:53
13.	"Take It Off" (bonus track)	Stanley, Bob Ezrin, Kane Roberts	Stanley	6:04
14.	"I Love It Loud"	Simmons, Vincent	Simmons	3:20
15.	"Detroit Rock City"	Stanley, Ezrin	Stanley	5:30
16.	"God Gave Rock 'n' Roll to You II"	Stanley, Simmons, Ezrin, Russ Ballard	Stanley, Simmons	5:22
17.	"Star-Spangled Banner"	John Stafford Smith	(instrumental)	2:40

"Take It Off" was a bonus track on the Japanese, European and South American CD releases and the US vinyl release. This version of the album would later be included in the Kiss Alive! 1975–2000 CD box set.

== Personnel ==
Kiss

- Paul Stanley – rhythm guitar, vocals
- Gene Simmons – bass, vocals
- Bruce Kulick – lead guitar, backing vocals
- Eric Singer – drums, backing vocals

Additional musician

- Derek Sherinian – keyboards

Production

- Eddie Kramer – co-producer, mixing
- Kiss – co-producers
- David Hewitt – engineering consultant
- Michael Bernard – post production editing
- GGGarth – mixing
- Brian Scheuble, Brian Virtue, Mike Douglass, Peter Magdaleno – mixing assistants
- Stephen Marcussen – mastering
- Margery Greenspan – art direction
- Mitchell Kanner – design

== Charts ==
Chart (1993)	Peak position
Australian Albums (ARIA)	14
Austrian Albums (Ö3 Austria)	31
Canada Top Albums/CDs (RPM)	9
Dutch Albums (Album Top 100)	58
Finnish Albums (The Official Finnish Charts)	25
German Albums (Offizielle Top 100)	57
Japanese Albums (Oricon)	22
Norwegian Albums (VG-lista)	15
Swedish Albums (Sverigetopplistan)	20
Swiss Albums (Schweizer Hitparade)	32
UK Albums (Official Charts)	24
US Billboard 200	9

== Certifications ==
Region	Certification	Certified units/sales
Canada (Music Canada)	Gold	50,000^{^}
United States (RIAA)	Gold	500,000^{^}
^{^} Shipments figures based on certification alone.

== Releases ==
- Mercury 314 514 777-2 (May 18, 1993): CD
- Mercury 314 522 647-1 (May 18, 1993): vinyl
- Universal Music (2014) B0020470-01: vinyl
