= Unholy (Kiss song) =

1992 single by Kiss

Single by Kiss

from the album Revenge
- Released: April 27, 1992
- Genre: Heavy metal
- Length: 3:40
- Label: Mercury
- Songwriters: Gene Simmons, Vinnie Vincent
- Producer: Bob Ezrin

Kiss singles chronology
""God Gave Rock 'N' Roll to You II" / "Junior's Gone Wild" (performed by King's X)" (1991)	"Unholy" (1992)	"Domino" (radio edit) / "Carr Jam 1981" (1992)

Music video
- "Unholy" on YouTube

"Unholy" is a song by American hard rock band Kiss, written by Gene Simmons and Vinnie Vincent. Featured on their 1992 album, Revenge, the song is one of the three Vincent co-writes to appear on the album despite the fact that he had been fired from the band 8 years earlier. The release of "Unholy" signaled the return to a heavier sound for Kiss. The song was played live during the Revenge Tour and was included on the 1993 live album Alive III, but did not return to the live Kiss set list until 2004's Rock the Nation Tour.

== Composition and recording ==
"Unholy" was co-written by Gene Simmons and Vinnie Vincent, although Vincent was fired in 1984. Simmons stated in his book Kiss and Make-Up:
"Vinnie Vincent came up to me and apologized for causing the band all the grief while he was a member. He wanted to patch things up and wondered if I would consider writing some songs with him. 'Sure', I said. I wanted to let bygones be bygones. I called Paul and told him that Vinnie had apparently changed. Paul wrote songs with him as well. But before the album was released, Vinnie was up to his old tricks again. He reneged on a signed deal we had made and decided that he wanted to renegotiate. He eventually sued us and lost. As far as I was concerned, he was persona non grata forever."

Two other songs which appear on the album, "I Just Wanna" and "Heart of Chrome", were also co-written by Vincent. The song is, according to Simmons, based on a Wicked Lester song "Keep Me Waiting" which appears on the album The Original Wicked Lester Sessions. Vincent suggested a number of changes, mostly lyrical changes which as Simmons said, made the song even better.

"Unholy" is considered one of the heaviest songs in the band's catalog. The song features Jesse Damon from Silent Rage, who sang backing vocals on the track. He also sang backing vocals on "Thou Shalt Not" (which he even co-wrote), "Take It Off", "Tough Love", "Heart of Chrome" and "I Just Wanna". It has been said by many Kiss insiders that the amplifier feedback at the beginning of the album version of "Unholy" is from Vinnie Vincent.

== Release ==
As a single, "Unholy" was released in the United States as a promotional single, but it broke the Top-30 in five countries, reaching its highest in Norway, number 2, which was the highest of all singles from Revenge. The B-side was God Gave Rock 'N' Roll to You II, a reworking of the Argent song God Gave Rock and Roll to You.

== Music video ==
A music video was filmed at Southern Bay Studios in Carson, California, and was directed by Paul Rachman. The video did not receive regular rotation airplay, as it showed children dancing on pentagrams and Damien Thorn-like twins casting demonic shadows, which would in turn cause mass protests at MTV from the Christian conservatives, but did feature on MTV's Headbangers Ball program, airing regularly there.

== Reception ==
"Unholy" was voted by fans as the 37th best Kiss song in a 2014 feature for Classic Rock magazine.

== Covers ==
"Unholy"

Single by Black Veil Brides (featuring Zakk Wylde)

from the album Rebels
- Released: December 2011
- Genre: Hard rock, alternative metal, glam metal
- Length: 3:23
- Label: Lava Records, Universal Republic Records
- Songwriters: Gene Simmons, Vinnie Vincent

Black Veil Brides (featuring Zakk Wylde) singles chronology
"Rebel Love Song" (2011)	"Unholy" (2011)	"In the End" (2012)

In 2008, the song was parodied on the Kiss tribute album KISS MY ANKH: A Tribute To Vinnie Vincent, written and performed by rock & roll comic C.C. Banana. The parody is called "Ted Poley" and was inspired by a real life encounter between Danger Danger vocalist Ted Poley and Kiss frontman Paul Stanley, while the two bands were on tour together in 1992. The other cover found on the album was recorded by Curse God and Die.
German band Die Ärzte, who supported Kiss in 1996, recorded a German version of the song in 1994 for the tribute album Kiss My Ass: Classic Kiss Regrooved.
American rock band Black Veil Brides did a cover of the song on their EP Rebels which was released on December 13, 2011. Ozzy Osbourne/Black Label Society guitarist, Zakk Wylde is featured on this version, playing the guitar solo Black Veil Brides has cited Kiss (along with Mötley Crüe) as their biggest influences image-wise.

== Appearances ==
"Unholy" has appeared on following Kiss albums:

- Revenge - studio version
- Alive III - live version
- The Box Set - edited studio version
- The Best of Kiss, Volume 3: The Millennium Collection - studio version
- Kiss Alive! 1975–2000 - Alive III version

== Track listing ==
=== CD-Maxi ===
1. "Unholy" (Gene Simmons, Vinnie Vincent) - 3:40
2. "God Gave Rock 'N' Roll to You II" (Russ Ballard, Paul Stanley, Simmons, Bob Ezrin) - 5:23
3. "Deuce" (Demo) (Simmons) - 3:25
4. "Strutter" (Demo) (Stanley, Simmons) - 4:58

=== Limited Special Edition - CD-Single ===
==== CD-Single 1 ====
1. "Unholy" (Gene Simmons, Vinnie Vincent) - 3:40
2. "God Gave Rock 'N' Roll to You II" (Russ Ballard, Paul Stanley, Simmons, Bob Ezrin) - 5:23
3. "Deuce" (Demo) (Simmons) - 3:25
4. "Strutter" (Demo) (Stanley, Simmons) - 4:58

==== CD-Single 2 ====
1. Kiss - Fifteen Years On (Interview)

== Personnel ==
- Gene Simmons – lead vocals, bass, songwriting
- Bruce Kulick – lead & rhythm guitar, backing vocals
- Eric Singer – drums, backing vocals
- Paul Stanley – backing vocals

with

- Jesse Damon – backing vocals
- Vinnie Vincent - songwriting

== Charts ==
Chart (1992)	Peak position
Germany (GfK)	26
Netherlands (Dutch Top 40)	26
Norway (VG-lista)	2
Sweden (Sverigetopplistan)	19
UK Singles (OCC)	26
