= I Love It Loud =

1982 song by the American rock band Kiss

Single by Kiss

from the album Creatures of the Night
- Released: 1982
- Studio: Record Plant Studios, Los Angeles
- Genre: Heavy metal; hard rock; arena rock
- Length: 4:15
- Label: Casablanca NB-2365 (US)
- Songwriters: Gene Simmons, Vincent Cusano
- Producers: Michael James Jackson, Gene Simmons & Paul Stanley

Kiss singles chronology
"I" (1981)	"I Love It Loud" / "Danger" (1982)	"Lick It Up" / "Dance All Over Your Face" (1983)
"Every Time I Look at You" / "Partners in Crime (Remix)" (1992)	"I Love It Loud (Live)" / "Unholy (Live)" (1993)	"Rock and Roll All Nite (Unplugged)" / "Every Time I Look at You (Unplugged)" (1996)

Alternative cover
- 7" Vinyl version

Music video
- "I Love It Loud" on YouTube

"I Love It Loud" is a song by the American rock band Kiss. It was released on their 1982 album Creatures of the Night, and became a staple of the band's live shows.

== Background ==
The track was written by bassist/vocalist Gene Simmons and guitarist Vinnie Vincent, although some versions of the album mistakenly credit Paul Stanley and Vincent. The latter had been working with songwriter Adam Mitchell when he discovered that Mitchell had connections to Kiss, and Vincent made it a point to meet Simmons through Mitchell. After meeting and exchanging phone numbers with Simmons, the two got together and wrote "I Love It Loud" in addition to another song called "Killer", which was also later included on the Creatures album, during the same writing session.

The song fades out, only to come back even louder, and then fades out a second time. This idea was taken from the Beatles' songs "Helter Skelter" and "Strawberry Fields Forever". The 1985 remixed version only fades out once.

Released as a single in 1982, it was only the second Kiss single to feature a picture sleeve and marked the final Kiss single released on the Casablanca label. As a single, the song did not fare particularly well, failing to crack the Billboard Hot 100, although it did "bubble under" at No. 102. The song hit #45 on the RPM Singles Chart in Canada in March 1983. Musician and musicologist Julian Cope, calling it the "sole classic" from Creatures of the Night, described its "J. Bonham-as-Thor drum fundament" as "one of thee most colossal pounded in many a year." He continued: "Even the video was damned fine for its time, but those drum stops still sound like Ragnarök to me every time."

Cash Box said that "Eric Carr’s primitive drum throbs, the group's tribal cries and co-writer Gene Simmons’ fierce lead vocal set a scene where 'the Jungle is the only rule.'"

== Music video ==
A video was filmed which featured the band, then officially consisting of Simmons, guitarist/vocalist Paul Stanley, drummer Eric Carr, and guitarist Ace Frehley, on stage performing the song while teenagers, watching them perform on television, are being brainwashed/ hypnotized (or perhaps also inspired) by their performance. As the song progresses, the father's newspaper catches fire, the telephone melts, a teacup explodes, the refrigerator door swings open and food items tumble out as the mother stops and stares in disbelief, and a large crack appears in the wall near the television. Howard Marks, one of KISS's business managers from 1976 to 1988, stars as the father in the video.

Screenshot from "I Love It Loud" video.

The video was directed by Paul Davey and produced by John Weaver for Keefco. It also marked the final video for which Kiss wore their famous make-up before unmasking in 1983. Although the lead guitarist who recorded the song really was the unofficial member Vinnie Vincent, the music video features performing Ace Frehley due to contractual reasons, being the last Kiss video to include him (excluding various television appearances Frehley did with the group in support for Creatures of the Night) before his departure later that year.

"I Love It Loud" was the last Kiss single to feature Simmons on lead vocals until "God Gave Rock 'N' Roll to You II" in 1991, and the last to feature Simmons as the sole lead vocalist until "Unholy" in 1992.

== Alternative versions and covers ==
This song also appears on other releases such as 1993's Alive III and on Kiss' The Box Set in 2001. The single of the live version reached number 22 on Billboard's Mainstream Rock Tracks. A remixed version of the track appears on Kiss's 1988 greatest hits album, Smashes, Thrashes & Hits, that features a notably different drum sound and is missing the fade out in the middle of the song.

The Phunk Junkeez reworked the song and covered it on their 1995 Injected album, retitled "I Love It Loud" (Injected Mix). The song was later included in the soundtrack for the 1995 comedy film, Tommy Boy (starring Chris Farley and David Spade); a music video for the song was made that featured Farley and Spade (in their film character roles) come upon and take part in a concert held by the Phunk Junkeez while clips from the film were interspersed. The song reached number 88 on the Australian ARIA Singles Chart.

In 1999, Snow recorded a dancehall reggae cover of the song, entitled simply Loud, on his Cooler Conditions album.

For many years, when the band performed the song in concert, the second verse was shortened.

== Personnel ==
- Gene Simmons – lead vocals, bass
- Eric Carr – drums, percussion, backing vocals
- Vincent Cusano – guitar
- Dave Wittman – backing vocals

== Charts ==
Chart (1983)	Peak position
Australian Singles (Kent Music Report)	76
Canada Top Singles (RPM)	45
US Bubbling Under Hot 100 (Billboard)	102
