= Revenge (Kiss album) =

Studio album by Kiss
- Released: May 19, 1992
- Recorded: February 1991 – March 1992 ("Carr Jam 1981" recorded 1981)
- Studios: Rumbo, Canoga Park; Track Record, North Hollywood; Cornerstone, Chatsworth; Ocean Way, Hollywood; Acme Recording, Sherman Oaks; The Enterprise, Burbank; A&M, Hollywood
- Genres: Hard rock; heavy metal
- Length: 48:51
- Label: Mercury
- Producer: Bob Ezrin

Kiss chronology
Hot in the Shade (1989)	Revenge (1992)	Alive III (1993)

Singles from Revenge
- 1. "God Gave Rock 'n' Roll to You II" Released: August 22, 1991; 2. "Unholy" Released: May 4, 1992; 3. "Domino" Released: 1992; 4. "I Just Wanna" Released: 1992; 5. "Every Time I Look at You" Released: 1992

Revenge is the sixteenth studio album by American rock band Kiss, released on May 19, 1992. It is the band's first album to feature drummer Eric Singer, following the death of former drummer Eric Carr in November 1991, and is the group's last album to feature musical contributions from the latter. Marking a stylistic departure from pop-influenced glam metal, which characterized much of the band's 1980s output, for a heavier sound, the album reached the Top 20 in several countries, though it failed to reestablish the group back in the mainstream and its sales were equal-to or less than its predecessors, ultimately only being certified gold by the RIAA on July 20, 1992.

The album was dedicated to Carr, and the closing track, "Carr Jam 1981", is a demo the drummer had recorded soon after joining the group in 1980. One modification to the song was the dubbing of Bruce Kulick's guitar over Ace Frehley's original work. The main riff of the song was used as the basis for the Frehley's Comet song "Breakout", from the 1987 album Frehley's Comet.

== Background ==
In February 1991, Kiss was asked by the producers of the film Bill & Ted's Bogus Journey to record "God Gave Rock 'n Roll to You II" (a remake of the song "God Gave Rock and Roll to You" by the English rock band Argent). The band agreed and reunited with producer Bob Ezrin, ten years after the debacle of Music From "The Elder". Gene Simmons was not sure it was the right move, "especially after the bad experience of "The Elder"". But Simmons, Ezrin and Paul Stanley rewrote the lyrics to the verses of the song, which they recorded at Ocean Way Recording, The Enterprise and A&M Studios in California, with both Eric Carr and Eric Singer: Singer played the drums while Carr, who was unable to play for his health problems, sang the a cappella line "...to everyone, He gave his song to be sung."

"God Gave Rock 'n Roll to You II" was featured in Bill & Ted's Bogus Journey with a 40-second Steve Vai solo instead of the Kiss intro found on the album and was a major success, hitting the Top 30 in seven countries, including the Mainstream Rock Tracks in the United States. Emboldened, the band decided to continue with Ezrin on a follow-up to Hot in the Shade.

Carr was diagnosed with heart cancer and underwent open-heart surgery in April 1991 to remove tumors. Shortly after the surgery, he joined the band to perform in the "God Gave Rock 'n' Roll" music video. According to Simmons, Carr had lost all his hair due to chemotherapy and had to wear a wig for the shoot. After the shoot, Stanley and Simmons persuaded Carr to take care of his health and not worry about the band. The original plan was for Singer to perform with the band only until Carr recovered, which never happened as Carr's health continued to worsen and he eventually died in November 1991 at the age of 41. As a result, Kiss officially hired Singer to replace Carr.

== Composition and recording ==
In December 1991, Kiss and Ezrin returned to the studio to work on a new album. In a surprising move, they sought help from former guitarist Vinnie Vincent. According to Simmons, "Vinnie Vincent came up to me and apologized for causing the band all the grief while he was a member. He wanted to patch things up and wondered if I would consider writing some songs with him. 'Sure,' I said. I wanted to let bygones be bygones. I called Paul and told him that Vinnie had apparently changed. Paul wrote songs with him as well. But before the album was released, Vinnie was up to his old tricks again. He reneged on a signed deal we had made and decided that he wanted to renegotiate. He eventually sued us and lost. As far as I was concerned, he was persona non grata forever."

With Dave "The Snake" Sabo of Skid Row, Stanley wrote "Do Ya Wanna Touch Me Now", which ultimately failed to make the tracklist. "It's a great luxury to have an album that's so good that another song is only going to detract from it rather than make it any better," Stanley observed. "As good as the song is, we didn't need it." The two met when Stanley was on the phone with Nikki Sixx, who had Sabo on the other line. They later discussed Stanley's possible appearance for Skid Row's recording of Kiss' "C'mon and Love Me" for the all-covers EP B-Side Ourselves. That was never made, so the two wrote a song in Los Angeles.

Stanley also worked with Jani Lane of Warrant on "If You Could See Through My Eyes". The collaboration began before the sessions for "God Gave Rock 'n' Roll to You II" and during the recording of Warrant's most successful album Cherry Pie. Stanley also penned "Take It Off" with Kane Roberts (formerly of Alice Cooper), which was featured heavily during the Revenge Tour.

Simmons went to work with Bob Dylan. The music was written at the former's guesthouse, and Simmons asked Dylan to complete the lyrics. Dylan insisted that Simmons write them. "I wanted to write a song with Dylan", the Kiss bassist explained. "So, like most things I do, I bullheadedly picked up the phone, tracked down his manager, and said, 'Hi, I'm that guy who sticks his tongue out, and I wanna write a song with Dylan,' or words to that effect. The results could only be 'yes' and 'no.' Dylan said yes. He came over to my house a few years back, and we sat down and started throwing ideas around. Bob came up with a melody/chordal pattern... I chimed in with a melody/chorus idea and voila, we had a song. Lyrics weren't written as yet. I demoed the track with Tommy Thayer. Bob came down to visit and listen. When the demo was done, I asked Bob to write the lyric. He said no, why don't I write it. I have tried to write a meaningful lyric, but it has eluded me. I've bumped into Bob a few times... in Tokyo, while he was on tour, and every time I ask him to write the lyric, and he always says, 'Mr. KISS, you write it.'" The song, originally titled "Laughing When I Want to Cry", was later renamed to "Waiting for the Morning Light" and released on Simmons's second solo album Asshole.

The recording of the album was finished in March 1992. Additional personnel included Dick Wagner of Alice Cooper on the guitar solo for "Every Time I Look at You" (Wagner had previously performed as a ghost player on Destroyer), Kevin Valentine on drums for "Take It Off" (Valentine later performed drums as a ghost player on Psycho Circus), Jesse Damon, Tommy Thayer, and Jaime St. James on backing vocals. Thayer later became Kiss's lead guitarist, after Ace Frehley left the band for a second time.

"God Gave Rock 'n' Roll to You II" and "Carr Jam 1981" were not planned to be featured on the album, but after the death of Carr, the two were included, and the album was dedicated to Carr. During the Kissology Volume Two: 1978–1991 special aired on VH1 Classic, Simmons stated that "God Gave Rock 'n' Roll to You II" is "not just a cover song for a soundtrack, but a testament to Eric Carr".

"I'm usually most embarrassed by some of our records," Simmons remarked. "Some of the Kiss records, I could just kick myself in the butt for ever having anything to do with. [But] you learn by your mistakes. That's what enables you to make a good record… like Revenge."

== Release ==
After the success of "God Gave Rock 'n' Roll to You II", Mercury Records released "Unholy" as a single in Europe and it charted in 5 countries. The following singles – "Domino", "I Just Wanna" and "Every Time I Look at You" – were less successful, with the first two receiving only consistent airplay on mainstream rock radios in the US. Music videos were made for each single, with Revenge being the Kiss album with the most produced music videos.

== Reception ==
Professional ratings
Review scores
Source	Rating
AllMusic	3/5 stars
Collector's Guide to Heavy Metal	8/10
Encyclopedia of Popular Music	3/5 stars
Entertainment Weekly	C−
The Rolling Stone Album Guide	1/5 stars

The album received mixed reviews. Billboard acclaimed the return to form of the band, while at the same time Rolling Stone's review was harsh, giving the album one out of five stars. John Franck of AllMusic praised Ezrin's production, which made Kiss sound "fresh again" and wrote that "some of the cuts are excellent, delivered with conviction and panache, but for all the hype, the album is also tainted with filler." Canadian journalist Martin Popoff liked the album and remarked "the new levels of intricacy and surprise metalodies" in the songs, "putting Kiss back in charge of their particular brand of doofus metal".

Revenge debuted at number 6 on the Billboard 200 and was the band's first Top 10 album in the United States since the 1979's Dynasty. The album reached the Top 10 in Australia (number 5), the United Kingdom and Sweden (number 10), Switzerland (number 6), and Norway (number 4). Despite the high debut, the album quickly fell off the charts but sold enough for the gold certificate in the United States and Canada. As of February 12, 2007, the album has sold over 596,000 copies in the United States, according to Nielsen Soundscan.

== Track listing ==
All credits adapted from the original release.

No.	Title	Writer(s)	Lead vocals	Length
1.	"Unholy"	Gene Simmons, Vinnie Vincent	Simmons	3:40
2.	"Take It Off"	Paul Stanley, Bob Ezrin, Kane Roberts	Stanley	4:50
3.	"Tough Love"	Stanley, Bruce Kulick, Ezrin	Stanley	3:44
4.	"Spit"	Simmons, Scott Van Zen, Stanley	Simmons, Stanley	3:32
5.	"God Gave Rock 'n' Roll to You II"	Russ Ballard, Stanley, Simmons, Ezrin	Stanley, Simmons	5:18
6.	"Domino"	Simmons	Simmons	4:01
7.	"Heart of Chrome"	Stanley, Vincent, Ezrin	Stanley	4:02
8.	"Thou Shalt Not"	Simmons, Jesse Damon	Simmons	3:59
9.	"Every Time I Look at You"	Stanley, Ezrin	Stanley	4:38
10.	"Paralyzed"	Simmons, Ezrin	Simmons	4:14
11.	"I Just Wanna"	Stanley, Vincent	Stanley	4:07
12.	"Carr Jam 1981"	Eric Carr	(instrumental)	2:46
Total length:				48:51

== Personnel ==
=== Kiss ===
- Paul Stanley – vocals, rhythm guitar, 12-string acoustic guitar on "Every Time I Look at You"
- Gene Simmons – vocals, bass
- Bruce Kulick – lead guitar, all guitars on tracks 1, 3, 4, 6, 8, 10 and 12, bass on tracks 3, 9 and 12
- Eric Singer – drums, percussion, backing vocals
- Eric Carr – drums on "Carr Jam 1981", backing vocals on "God Gave Rock 'n' Roll to You II"

=== Additional personnel ===
- Kevin Valentine – drums on "Take It Off"
- Dick Wagner − guitar solo on "Every Time I Look at You"
- Tommy Thayer, Jesse Damon, Jaime St. James – backing vocals

=== Production ===
- Bob Ezrin – producer, strings & horn arrangement, keyboards
- Chris Steinmetz, Niko Bolas, George Tutko– engineers
- Pete Magdaleno, Dick Keneshiro, Bart Stevens, Andy Udoff, Julie Last, Richard Hasal – assistant engineers
- Mick Guzauski, Rall Rogut – mixing at Record One, Los Angeles
- George Marino – mastering at Sterling Sound, New York

== Charts ==
Chart (1992)	Peak position
Australian Albums (ARIA)	5
Austrian Albums (Ö3 Austria)	14
Canada Top Albums/CDs (RPM)	11
Dutch Albums (Album Top 100)	46
European Albums Charts	25
Finnish Albums (The Official Finnish Charts)	15
German Albums (Offizielle Top 100)	16
Hungarian Albums (MAHASZ)	27
Japanese Albums (Oricon)	14
Norwegian Albums (VG-lista)	4
Swedish Albums (Sverigetopplistan)	10
Swiss Albums (Schweizer Hitparade)	6
UK Albums (Official Charts)	10
US Billboard 200	6

== Certifications ==
Region	Certification	Certified units/sales
Canada (Music Canada)	Gold	50,000^{^}
United States (RIAA)	Gold	500,000^{^}
^{^} Shipments figures based on certification alone.
