= The Best of Kiss, Volume 2: The Millennium Collection =

Greatest hits album by Kiss
- Released: June 15, 2004
- Recorded: 1982–1989
- Genre: Hard rock
- Length: 48:50
- Labels: Mercury; Universal

Kiss chronology
The Millennium Collection: The Best of Kiss (2003)	The Best of Kiss, Volume 2: The Millennium Collection (2004)	Alive! The Millennium Concert (2006)

Professional ratings
Review scores
Source	Rating
AllMusic	2.5/5 stars
Rolling Stone	3/5 stars

The Best of Kiss, Volume 2: The Millennium Collection is the first compilation to feature exclusively the 1980s output from American rock band Kiss. Released on June 15, 2004, it is the second album in a trilogy of Millennium Collection albums featuring material from Kiss. It compiles the period from late 1982–89, skipping material from 1980's Unmasked and 1981's Music From "The Elder".

This disc, along with Volumes 1 and 3 of the Millennium Collection, was repackaged and released as a collection known as "Playlist...Plus" in 2008.

== Track listing ==
No.	Title	Writer(s)	Original Album	Length
1.	"Creatures of the Night"	Paul Stanley, Adam Mitchell	Creatures of the Night	4:05
2.	"I Love It Loud"	Gene Simmons, Vincent Cusano	Creatures of the Night	4:18
3.	"Lick It Up"	Stanley, Vincent	Lick It Up	3:58
4.	"All Hell's Breakin' Loose"	Eric Carr, Stanley, Vincent, Simmons	Lick It Up	4:35
5.	"Heaven's on Fire"	Stanley, Desmond Child	Animalize	3:23
6.	"Thrills in the Night"	Stanley, Jean Beauvoir	Animalize	4:24
7.	"Tears Are Falling"	Stanley	Asylum	3:56
8.	"Uh! All Night"	Stanley, Child, Beauvoir	Asylum	4:03
9.	"Crazy Crazy Nights"	Stanley, Mitchell	Crazy Nights	3:48
10.	"Reason To Live"	Stanley, Child	Crazy Nights	4:01
11.	"Hide Your Heart"	Stanley, Child, Holly Knight	Hot in the Shade	4:25
12.	"Forever"	Stanley, Michael Bolton	Hot in the Shade	3:49

== Personnel ==
Members

- Paul Stanley – Vocals, Rhythm Guitar, Acoustic Guitar (Track 12), Bass (Track 7)
- Gene Simmons – Vocals, Bass
- Eric Carr – Drums, Backing Vocals
- Bruce Kulick – Lead Guitar and Backing Vocals (Tracks 7–12), Bass and Acoustic Guitar Solo (Track 12)
- Vinnie Vincent – Lead Guitar and Backing Vocals (Tracks 2–4)
- Mark St. John – Lead Guitar (Track 5–6)

Additional personnel

- Jean Beauvoir – Bass and Backing Vocals (Tracks 6 & 8)
- Steve Farris – Guitar Solo (Track 1)
- Adam Mitchell – Additional Guitar (Track 1)
- Mike Porcaro – Bass (Track 1)
- Phil Ashley – Keyboards (Tracks 10–12), Backing Vocals (Track 11)
- Dave Wittman – Backing Vocals (Track 2)
- Desmond Child - Backing Vocals (Track 5)
