= Smashes, Thrashes & Hits =

Greatest hits album by Kiss
- Released: November 15, 1988
- Recorded: 1973–1988
- Genres: Hard rock, glam metal
- Length: 51:54
- Labels: Mercury; Vertigo (UK)
- Producer: Various

Kiss chronology
Chikara (1988)	Smashes, Thrashes & Hits (1988)	Hot in the Shade (1989)

Singles from Smashes, Trashes & Hits
- 1. "Let's Put the X in Sex" Released: October 11, 1988; 2. "(You Make Me) Rock Hard" Released: December 1988

Smashes, Thrashes & Hits is a compilation album by the American hard rock band Kiss. It was the fourth hits album overall but the second hits album released by the band in the United States (Killers and Chikara were not released there originally). Of the 15 songs on the album, two were new compositions, and three were released after the band's unmasking in 1983. The remaining 10 were all released during the band's years in make-up.

The two new songs on Smashes, Thrashes & Hits were "Let's Put the X in Sex" and "(You Make Me) Rock Hard.” They were both produced and co-written by guitarist/vocalist Paul Stanley and were accompanied by videos.

Nearly all of the songs recorded by the band's original lineup were remixed or altered in one way or another. "Beth" was re-recorded with lead vocals by drummer Eric Carr, who had replaced the original drummer Peter Criss in 1980. It was Carr's first lead vocal on a Kiss album. The cover art was done by Amy Guip and directed by Mitchell Kanner.

== Reception ==
Professional ratings
Review scores
Source	Rating
AllMusic	4/5 stars
Collector's Guide to Heavy Metal	6/10
Encyclopedia of Popular Music	3/5 stars
Metal Hammer	4/5 stars
The Rolling Stone Album Guide	3.5/5 stars

Smashes, Thrashes & Hits was certified 2× Platinum by the RIAA on February 26, 1996.

In the United States Smashes, Thrashes & Hits is the best-selling Kiss album since Nielsen SoundScan began tracking record sales in 1991 with 830,000 copies sold until March 4, 2012.

== Track listing ==
All credits adapted from the original releases.

North American Edition
No.	Title	Writer(s)	Original album	Length
1.	"Let's Put the X in Sex"	Paul Stanley, Desmond Child	previously unreleased	3:48
2.	"(You Make Me) Rock Hard"	Stanley, Child, Diane Warren	previously unreleased	3:26
3.	"Love Gun" (remix)	Stanley	Love Gun	3:31
4.	"Detroit Rock City" (remix)	Stanley, Bob Ezrin	Destroyer	3:45
5.	"I Love It Loud" (remix)	Gene Simmons, Vinnie Vincent	Creatures of the Night	3:48
6.	"Deuce" (remix)	Simmons	KISS	3:20
7.	"Lick It Up"	Vincent, Stanley	Lick It Up	3:53
8.	"Heaven's on Fire"	Stanley, Child	Animalize	3:19
9.	"Calling Dr. Love" (remix)	Simmons	Rock and Roll Over	3:38
10.	"Strutter" (remix)	Stanley, Simmons	KISS	3:18
11.	"Beth" (Eric Carr vocal)	Peter Criss, Stan Penridge, Ezrin	1988 re-recording originally from Destroyer	2:46
12.	"Tears Are Falling"	Stanley	Asylum	3:54
13.	"I Was Made for Lovin' You"	Stanley, Child, Vini Poncia	Dynasty	4:29
14.	"Rock and Roll All Nite" (remix)	Stanley, Simmons	Dressed To Kill	2:56
15.	"Shout It Out Loud" (remix)	Stanley, Simmons, Ezrin	Destroyer	3:07
Total length:				51:54

United Kingdom Edition
No.	Title	Writer(s)	Original album	Length
1.	"Let's Put the X in Sex"	Stanley, Child	previously unreleased	3:48
2.	"Crazy Crazy Nights"	Stanley, Adam Mitchell	Crazy Nights	3:45
3.	"(You Make Me) Rock Hard"	Stanley, Child, Warren	previously unreleased	3:26
4.	"Love Gun" (remix)	Stanley	Love Gun	3:31
5.	"Detroit Rock City" (remix)	Stanley, Ezrin	Destroyer	3:45
6.	"I Love It Loud" (remix)	Simmons, Vincent	Creatures of the Night	3:48
7.	"Reason to Live"	Stanley, Child	Crazy Nights	3:59
8.	"Lick It Up"	Vincent, Stanley	Lick It Up	3:53
9.	"Heaven's on Fire"	Stanley, Child	Animalize	3:19
10.	"Calling Dr. Love" (remix)	Simmons	Rock and Roll Over	3:38
11.	"Strutter" (remix)	Stanley, Simmons	KISS	3:18
12.	"Beth" (Eric Carr vocal)	Criss, Penridge, Ezrin	Destroyer	2:46
13.	"Tears Are Falling"	Stanley	Asylum	3:54
14.	"I Was Made for Lovin' You"	Stanley, Child, Poncia	Dynasty	4:29
15.	"Rock and Roll All Night" (remix)	Stanley, Simmons	Dressed To Kill	2:56
16.	"Shout It Out Loud" (remix)	Stanley, Simmons, Ezrin	Destroyer	3:07
Total length:				56:18

== Personnel ==
Kiss

- Paul Stanley – vocals, rhythm guitar, bass on "Let's Put the X in Sex", "(You Make Me) Rock Hard", "Love Gun" and "Tears Are Falling", drum programming (bass drum and hi-hat) on "Let's Put the X in Sex"
- Gene Simmons – bass, vocals
- Eric Carr – drums on "Let's Put the X in Sex", "Crazy Crazy Nights", "(You Make Me) Rock Hard", "I Love It Loud", "Reason to Live", "Lick It Up", "Heaven's on Fire" and "Tears Are Falling", vocals on "Beth"
- Bruce Kulick − lead guitar on "Let's Put the X in Sex", "Crazy Crazy Nights", "(You Make Me) Rock Hard", "Reason to Live" and "Tears Are Falling"
- Peter Criss – drums on "Love Gun", "Detroit Rock City", "Deuce", "Calling Dr. Love", "Strutter", "Rock and Roll All Nite" and "Shout It Out Loud"
- Ace Frehley – lead guitar on "Love Gun", "Detroit Rock City", "Deuce", "Calling Dr. Love", "Strutter", "I Was Made for Lovin' You", "Rock and Roll All Nite" and "Shout It Out Loud"
- Vinnie Vincent – lead guitar on "Lick It Up" and "I Love It Loud"
- Mark St. John – lead guitar on "Heaven's on Fire"

Additional musicians

- Phil Ashley – keyboards on "Let's Put the X in Sex", "(You Make Me) Rock Hard" and "Reason to Live"
- Anton Fig – drums on "I Was Made for Lovin' You"
- Vini Poncia – keyboards and backing vocals on "I Was Made for Lovin' You"
- Dick Wagner – acoustic guitar on "Beth"
- Bob Ezrin – piano on "Beth"
- Eddie Kramer – keyboards on "Love Gun"
- Allan Schwartzberg – drum overdubs on "Heaven's on Fire" and "Tears Are Falling"

== Charts ==
Chart (1988–1989)	Peak position
Australian Albums (ARIA)	38
Dutch Albums (Album Top 100)	88
German Albums (Offizielle Top 100)	65
Japanese Albums (Oricon)	51
Norwegian Albums (VG-lista)	13
Swedish Albums (Sverigetopplistan)	30
Swiss Albums (Schweizer Hitparade)	29
UK Albums (Official Charts)	62
US Billboard 200	21

== Certifications ==
Region	Certification	Certified units/sales
Canada (Music Canada)	Platinum	100,000^{^}
United States (RIAA)	2× Platinum	2,000,000^{^}
^{^} Shipments figures based on certification alone.
