= Asylum Tour (Kiss) =

1985–1986 concert tour by Kiss

- Tour by Kiss
- Poster to the concert in Toronto, Canada
- Associated album: Asylum
- Start date: November 29, 1985
- End date: April 12, 1986
- No. of shows: 91

Kiss concert chronology
- Animalize World Tour (1984–1985); Asylum Tour (1985–1986); Crazy Nights World Tour (1987–1988)

The Asylum Tour was a concert tour by American rock band Kiss, in support of their thirteenth studio album, Asylum.

== Background ==
On April 3, 1986, the band was set to perform in the Civic Arena in Pittsburgh, when a transformer ended up blowing out the lights two hours before the show, cancelling the performance that night and later rescheduled to April 12.

Tommy Thayer, a future member of Kiss, who was in Black 'n Blue at the time, had impressed Simmons when his band had opened for Kiss.

In the tour program for the band's final tour, Stanley reflected on the tour:

Over the years the band has been in existence, the ritual of getting ready has literally stayed the same for the last forty plus years. Since the late Seventies we've had a Superman bed sheet that's taped across the door so that if people walk by and the door is open, you don't get a free glimpse. The time that we spend in the dressing room getting ready gives us a chance to focus on what we have to do and interestingly it's calmest time of the night. It's the calm before the storm.

== Reception ==
Jerry Spangler, a reporter from the Deseret News who attended the Salt Palace performance, stated that the show was another typical Kiss show, criticizing how little there was regarding talent and excitement. He commented that when they take away the special effects, that Kiss was referred to as a dinosaur; concluding that the band should have closed their doors a long time ago, while also noting on the opening act W.A.S.P.'s performance in more paragraphs. Boyd Rogers, a reader who had attended the performance, later sent a response to the reporter to criticize him, and defending the band's performance, stating the number of people attending the concert; noting also on how short the paragraphs were regarding the band - suggesting that the reporter close his 'carnival doors'.

== Set lists ==
These are example set lists of what were performed during the tour, but may not represent the majority of the shows.

1985 Set list

1. "Detroit Rock City"
2. "Fits Like a Glove"
3. "Cold Gin"
4. "Uh! All Night" (with Paul Stanley guitar solo)
5. "War Machine" (with Eric Carr drum solo)
6. "I Still Love You"
7. "Under the Gun" (with Bruce Kulick guitar solo)
8. "Tears Are Falling"
9. "I Love It Loud" (with Gene Simmons bass solo)
10. "Love Gun"
11. "Rock and Roll All Nite"

Encore

12. "Heaven's on Fire"
13. "Won't Get Fooled Again"
14. "Lick It Up"

1986 Set list

1. "Detroit Rock City"
2. "Fits Like a Glove"
3. "Creatures of the Night"
4. "Cold Gin" (with Bruce Kulick guitar solo)
5. "Uh! All Night"
6. "War Machine" (with Eric Carr drum solo)
7. "Love Gun"
8. "I Still Love You"
9. "I Love It Loud" (with Gene Simmons bass solo)
10. "Heaven's on Fire" (with Paul Stanley guitar solo)
11. "Rock and Roll All Nite"

Encore

12. "Tears Are Falling"
13. "Lick It Up"

== Tour dates ==
List of 1985 concerts
Date	City	Country	Venue	Opening Act(s)
November 29, 1985	Little Rock	United States	Barton Coliseum	Black 'n Blue
November 30, 1985	Nashville	United States	Nashville Municipal Auditorium	Black 'n Blue
December 1, 1985	Memphis	United States	Mid-South Coliseum	Black 'n Blue
December 3, 1985	San Antonio	United States	HemisFair Arena	Black 'n Blue
December 4, 1985	Dallas	United States	Reunion Arena	Black 'n Blue
December 6, 1985	Lafayette	United States	Cajundome	Black 'n Blue
December 7, 1985	Houston	United States	Sam Houston Coliseum	Black 'n Blue
December 8, 1985	Austin	United States	Frank Erwin Center	Black 'n Blue
December 11, 1985	Richfield	United States	Richfield Coliseum	Black 'n Blue
December 12, 1985	Louisville	United States	Freedom Hall	Black 'n Blue
December 13, 1985	Trotwood	United States	Hara Arena	Black 'n Blue
December 14, 1985	Detroit	United States	Cobo Arena	Black 'n Blue
December 16, 1985	New York City	United States	Madison Square Garden	Black 'n Blue
December 17, 1985	Philadelphia	United States	Spectrum	Black 'n Blue
December 19, 1985	Glens Falls	United States	Glens Falls Civic Center	Black 'n Blue
December 20, 1985	Worcester	United States	Centrum in Worcester	Black 'n Blue
December 21, 1985	New Haven	United States	New Haven Coliseum	Black 'n Blue
December 22, 1985	Providence	United States	Providence Civic Center	Black 'n Blue
December 27, 1985	Columbia	United States	Carolina Coliseum	Black 'n Blue
December 28, 1985	Charlotte	United States	Charlotte Coliseum	Black 'n Blue
December 29, 1985	Greensboro	United States	Greensboro Coliseum Complex	Black 'n Blue
December 30, 1985	Augusta	United States	Augusta-Richmond County Civic Center	Black 'n Blue
December 31, 1985	Atlanta	United States	Omni Coliseum	Black 'n Blue

List of 1986 concerts
Date	City	Country	Venue	Opening Act(s)
January 3, 1986	Johnson City	United States	Freedom Hall Civic Center	W.A.S.P.
January 4, 1986	Knoxville	United States	Knoxville Civic Coliseum	W.A.S.P.
January 7, 1986	Tampa	United States	USF Sun Dome	W.A.S.P.
January 8, 1986	West Palm Beach	United States	West Palm Beach Auditorium	W.A.S.P.
January 9, 1986	Fort Myers	United States	Lee County Civic Center	W.A.S.P.
January 10, 1986	Jacksonville	United States	Jacksonville Coliseum	W.A.S.P.
January 12, 1986	San Juan	Puerto Rico	Roberto Clemente Coliseum	W.A.S.P.
January 14, 1986	Norfolk	United States	Norfolk Scope	W.A.S.P.
January 15, 1986	Charleston	United States	Charleston Civic Center	W.A.S.P.
January 16, 1986	Indianapolis	United States	Market Square Arena	W.A.S.P.
January 17, 1986	Chicago	United States	UIC Pavilion	W.A.S.P.
January 20, 1986	Milwaukee	United States	Milwaukee Auditorium	W.A.S.P.
January 21, 1986	Saint Paul	United States	St. Paul Civic Center	W.A.S.P.
January 22, 1986	Rockford	United States	Rockford MetroCentre	W.A.S.P.
January 23, 1986	St. Louis	United States	Kiel Auditorium	W.A.S.P.
January 24, 1986	Omaha	United States	Omaha Civic Auditorium	W.A.S.P.
January 25, 1986	Kansas City	United States	Municipal Auditorium	W.A.S.P.
February 2, 1986	Tucson	United States	McKale Center^{1}	W.A.S.P.
February 4, 1986	Daly City	United States	Cow Palace	W.A.S.P.
February 5, 1986	Sacramento	United States	Sacramento Memorial Auditorium	W.A.S.P.
February 7, 1986	Las Vegas	United States	Thomas & Mack Center	Black 'n Blue
February 8, 1986	San Bernardino	United States	Orange Pavilion	W.A.S.P.
February 9, 1986	Phoenix	United States	Arizona Veterans Memorial Coliseum	W.A.S.P.
February 10, 1986	San Diego	United States	San Diego Sports Arena	W.A.S.P.
February 11, 1986	Inglewood	United States	The Forum	W.A.S.P.
February 13, 1986	Portland	United States	Portland Memorial Coliseum	W.A.S.P.
February 14, 1986	Seattle	United States	Seattle Center Coliseum	W.A.S.P.
February 17, 1986	Salt Lake City	United States	Salt Palace^{2}	W.A.S.P.
February 19, 1986	Denver	United States	McNichols Sports Arena	W.A.S.P.
February 21, 1986	Norman	United States	Lloyd Noble Center	W.A.S.P.
February 22, 1986	Tulsa	United States	Expo Square Pavilion	W.A.S.P.
February 23, 1986	Waco	United States	Waco Convention Center	W.A.S.P.
February 24, 1986	Corpus Christi	United States	Corpus Christi Memorial Coliseum	W.A.S.P.
February 26, 1986	Beaumont	United States	Beaumont Civic Center	W.A.S.P.
February 27, 1986	Abilene	United States	Taylor County Expo Center	W.A.S.P.
February 28, 1986	Fort Worth	United States	Tarrant County Convention Center	W.A.S.P.
March 1, 1986	Shreveport	United States	Hirsch Memorial Coliseum	W.A.S.P.
March 2, 1986	New Orleans	United States	Kiefer UNO Lakefront Arena	W.A.S.P.
March 5, 1986	Green Bay	United States	Brown County Veterans Memorial Arena	King Kobra
March 6, 1986	Saginaw	United States	Wendler Arena	King Kobra
March 7, 1986	Port Huron	United States	McMorran Place	King Kobra
March 8, 1986	Springfield	United States	Prairie Capital Convention Center	King Kobra
March 9, 1986	Salina	United States	Bicentennial Center	King Kobra
March 12, 1986	La Crosse	United States	La Crosse Center	King Kobra
March 13, 1986	Duluth	United States	Duluth Arena	King Kobra
March 14, 1986	Jamestown	United States	Jamestown Civic Center	King Kobra
March 16, 1986	Des Moines	United States	Iowa Veterans Memorial Auditorium	King Kobra
March 17, 1986	Sioux City	United States	Sioux City Municipal Auditorium	King Kobra
March 18, 1986	Cedar Rapids	United States	Five Seasons Center	King Kobra
March 20, 1986	Fort Wayne	United States	Allen County War Memorial Coliseum	King Kobra
March 21, 1986	Cincinnati	United States	Cincinnati Gardens	King Kobra
March 22, 1986	Carbondale	United States	SIU Arena	King Kobra
March 23, 1986	Terre Haute	United States	Hulman Center	King Kobra
March 25, 1986	Evansville	United States	Roberts Municipal Stadium	King Kobra
March 26, 1986	Battle Creek	United States	Kellogg Arena	King Kobra
March 27, 1986	Erie	United States	Erie Civic Center	King Kobra
March 28, 1986	Toledo	United States	Toledo Sports Arena	King Kobra
March 29, 1986	Columbus	United States	Battelle Hall	King Kobra
March 30, 1986	Hammond	United States	Hammond Civic Center^{3}	King Kobra
April 1, 1986	Bethlehem	United States	Stabler Arena	King Kobra
April 2, 1986	Utica	United States	Utica Memorial Auditorium	King Kobra
April 4, 1986	Poughkeepsie	United States	Mid-Hudson Civic Center	King Kobra
April 6, 1986	Springfield	United States	Springfield Civic Center	King Kobra
April 7, 1986	Rochester	United States	Rochester Community War Memorial	King Kobra
April 8, 1986	Toronto	Canada	Maple Leaf Gardens^{4}	King Kobra
April 10, 1986	Baltimore	United States	Baltimore Civic Center	Blue Öyster Cult
April 11, 1986	East Rutherford	United States	Brendan Byrne Arena	Blue Öyster Cult
April 12, 1986	Pittsburgh	United States	Pittsburgh Civic Arena	Kix

- ^Note 1 Paul Stanley dedicated the Tucson, Arizona concert at the McKale Center to the astronauts that were killed in the Space Shuttle Challenger explosion.
- ^Note 2 The power went out in the middle of "Rock and Roll All Nite", ending the performance early.
- ^Note 3 Local church groups protested the entire show due to its being scheduled on Easter Sunday.
- ^Note 4 Opening act King Kobra was invited and appeared on stage to sing "Lick it Up" with Kiss, making King Kobra the first group to ever share the stage with Kiss.

=== Box office score data ===
List of box office score data with date, city, venue, attendance, gross, references
Date (1986)	City	Venue	Attendance	Gross	Ref(s)
January 8	West Palm Beach	Auditorium	5,063 / 6,400	$75,150	
January 16	Indianapolis	Market Square Arena	13,583 / 16,000	$196,301	
January 20	Milwaukee	MECCA Auditorium	4,254 / 6,120	$57,429	
January 21	Saint Paul	Civic Arena	8,700 / 11,000	$124,445	
January 23	St. Louis	Kiel Auditorium	5,949 / 10,532	$75,677	
January 24	Omaha	Civic Auditorium	6,426 / 8,000	$85,746	
January 25	Kansas City	Kemper Arena	6,922 / 9,000	$96,908	

== Personnel ==
- Paul Stanley – vocals, rhythm guitar
- Gene Simmons – vocals, bass
- Eric Carr – drums, backing vocals
- Bruce Kulick – lead guitar, backing vocals
