= Chikara (album) =

Greatest hits album by Kiss
- Released: May 25, 1988
- Genre: Hard rock, glam metal
- Length: 60:30
- Label: Polystar

Kiss chronology
Crazy Nights (1987)	Chikara (1988)	Smashes, Thrashes & Hits (1988)

Professional ratings
Review scores
Source	Rating
AllMusic	3/5 stars

Chikara (Japanese for "power") is a compilation album by American rock band Kiss, released in 1988 on Polystar.

== Background ==
The album was released on CD only in Japan in support of Kiss' 1988 Japanese tour. It was limited to 100,000 copies and has long been out of print. Early copies included a special sew-on patch of the Chikara symbol. One item of note is that this was the only official compact disc release of the extended 12" single version of the song "I Was Made for Lovin' You", until the 4-track "Psycho Circus" single in 1998.

== Track listing ==
No.	Title	Writer(s)	Length
1.	"Rock and Roll All Nite"	Gene Simmons, Paul Stanley	2:48
2.	"Detroit Rock City"	Stanley, Bob Ezrin	5:14
3.	"Love Gun"	Stanley	3:17
4.	"I Was Made for Lovin' You" (remix)	Stanley, Desmond Child, Vini Poncia	7:56
5.	"Creatures of the Night" (1985 remix)	Stanley, Adam Mitchell	4:02
6.	"I Love It Loud" (1985 remix)	Simmons, Vinnie Vincent	4:15
7.	"War Machine" (1985 remix)	Simmons, Bryan Adams, Jim Vallance	4:15
8.	"Lick It Up"	Stanley, Vincent	3:55
9.	"All Hell's Breakin' Loose"	Eric Carr, Stanley, Vincent, Simmons	4:33
10.	"Heaven's on Fire"	Stanley, Child	3:21
11.	"Thrills in the Night"	Stanley, Jean Beauvoir	4:00
12.	"Who Wants to Be Lonely"	Stanley, Child, Beauvoir	4:00
13.	"Uh! All Night"	Stanley, Child, Beauvoir	4:01
14.	"Tears Are Falling"	Stanley	3:55

The booklet incorrectly lists the three Creatures of the Night tracks as remixes. These tracks were taken from the 1985 remastering of the album. Only the title track is remixed. The tracks are not unique to this CD.

There is some debate as to the sourcing of the tracks. There is an odd fade-out of "Detroit Rock City" and an early fade-out/cutoff of "All Hell's Breakin’ Loose" as examples.

== Charts ==
Chart (1988)	Peak position
Japanese Albums (Oricon)	32
