= Animalize Live Uncensored =

Kiss: Animalize Live Uncensored

Video by Kiss
- Released: April 19, 1985
- Recorded: December 8, 1984
- Venue: Detroit Cobo Hall
- Genre: Hard rock, heavy metal
- Length: 88 minutes
- Label: RCA/Columbia Pictures Home Video
- Producer: Keith McMillan

Kiss chronology
| Kiss: Animalize Live Uncensored (1985) | Exposed (1987) |

German Edition cover

Kiss: Animalize Live Uncensored is a live video by the American rock band Kiss recorded at Detroit Cobo Hall on December 8, 1984, during Kiss's Animalize World Tour. It was originally aired on MTV. The tour featured perhaps the most varied setlist Kiss has ever played, featuring songs from seven of the band's studio releases up to that point. Three songs from Animalize were played, and many of the band's more popular songs were performed. The show was filmed on the same day temporary guitarist Bruce Kulick was named an official member, replacing Mark St. John. As suggested by its title, Animalize Live Uncensored features plenty of profane onstage banter from singer/guitarist Paul Stanley.

The concert has yet to be officially released on DVD. The only DVD version available is a Brazilian-produced bootleg ripped from a Japanese laserdisc.

== Track listing ==
| No. | Title | Writer(s) | Length |
|---|---|---|---|
| 1. | "Detroit Rock City" | Paul Stanley, Bob Ezrin |
| 2. | "Cold Gin" | Ace Frehley |
| 3. | "Creatures of the Night" | Stanley, Adam Mitchell |
| 4. | "Fits Like a Glove" | Gene Simmons |
| 5. | "Heaven's on Fire" | Stanley, Desmond Child |
| 6. | "Thrills in the Night" | Stanley, Jean Beauvoir |
| 7. | "Paul Stanley’s guitar solo" |
| 8. | "Under the Gun" | Stanley, Eric Carr, Child |
| 9. | "War Machine" | Simmons, Bryan Adams, Jim Vallance |
| 10. | "Eric Carr’s drum solo" |
| 11. | "Young and Wasted" | Simmons, Vinnie Vincent |
| 12. | "Gene Simmons’ bass solo" |
| 13. | "I Love It Loud" | Simmons, Vincent |
| 14. | "I Still Love You" | Stanley, Vincent |
| 15. | "Love Gun" | Stanley |
| 16. | "Lick It Up" | Stanley, Vincent |
| 17. | "Black Diamond" | Stanley |
| 18. | "Rock and Roll All Nite" | Stanley, Simmons |

== Personnel ==
- Paul Stanley – lead and backing vocals, rhythm guitar
- Gene Simmons – lead and backing vocals, bass guitar
- Eric Carr – drums, backing vocals, lead vocals on "Young and Wasted" and "Black Diamond"
- Bruce Kulick – lead guitar, backing vocals on "I Love It Loud"

== Certifications ==
| Region | Certification | Certified units/sales |
|---|---|---|
| United States (RIAA) | Platinum | 100,000^{^} |
^{^} Shipments figures based on certification alone.
