= Animalize World Tour =

1984–1985 concert tour by Kiss

- Tour by Kiss
- Poster to the concert in Brussels, Belgium
- Associated album: Animalize
- Start date: September 30, 1984
- End date: March 29, 1985
- Legs: 2
- No. of shows: 119

Kiss concert chronology
- Lick It Up World Tour (1983–1984); Animalize World Tour (1984–1985); Asylum Tour (1985–1986)

The Animalize World Tour was a concert tour by American rock band Kiss in support of their twelfth studio album, Animalize.

== Background ==
This was the first tour with Bruce Kulick on lead guitar, replacing Mark St. John who couldn't play due to his arthritic condition. Originally Kulick was a temporary replacement, but after St. John's condition improved and he returned to the group, the other members decided Kulick was a better fit musically, resulting in Kulick being named an official member on December 2, 1984 after the band had played three shows with St. John.

According to Pete Bishop, a reporter from The Pittsburgh Press, the design of the stage featured a leopard-zebra appearance taken from the cover of the album Animalize. The lighted band logo was hung over the upstage portion with specials effects also featuring blasting caps and sparkler jets. There was also colored lights on trusses and beneath meshwork ramps. A truss would lift downwards to lift up the guitarists and lift them to a catwalk, descending down later on a smoke spewing platform.

The Animalize period was the band's most successful of the decade with the crossover success of "Heaven's on Fire" onto CHR/Top 40 radio, a very well-attended concert trek, and with Animalize selling nearly 2 million copies by the end of the tour. The live video Animalize Live Uncensored was recorded at Cobo Hall on December 8, 1984 during this tour, later airing on MTV. On April 7, 2023, Kiss officially released the only known soundboard recording of a live show with Mark St. John, as part of their Off the Soundboard series. The concert was recorded on November 28, 1984 at the Mid-Hudson Civic Center in Poughkeepsie, New York.

In the tour program for the band's final tour, Simmons reflected on the tour:

You can't help but have a good time at one of our shows when everybody is going nuts onstage. That kind of good time is infectious. You can't fake it. You can't fool the audience. The people will see right through you if you put on a fake smile or you're not putting out your best. The band are alive and well and playing better than we ever have.

== Reception ==
Linda Moleski, a reporter from Billboard, who had attended the performance in Uniondale began her review by noting that the theatrics had not been toned down, but had toned down in appearance. She praised the concert as a 'powerful metal fury', but said she was disappointed from the performance of "Heaven's on Fire" as it was delivered more weakly and harshly. She pointed out the strong connection with both the audience and the players, even praising the uncluttered stage.

Jeff Bunch, a correspondent from The Spokesman-Review was not impressed from the band's performance in Spokane, stating that they were nothing more than a 'play-it-loud-and-say-it-crude' band and suggested that 'if the rumors that rock 'n roll died, it was true. He criticized that the band were strutting around on stage in a graphic matter while Stanley spent more time telling stories than singing - while noting the band having the audience on their feet throughout the whole performance. He concluded his review by stating that the band's success was relied on playing music loud and throwing in many theatrics as possible. He however, claimed that the opening act played to a better-than-average reception.

== Set lists ==
These are example set lists of what was performed during the tour on each leg, but may not represent the majority of the tour.

=== Europe set list ===
1. "Detroit Rock City"
2. "Cold Gin"
3. "Strutter"
4. "Fits Like a Glove"
5. "Heaven's on Fire"
6. "Under the Gun"
7. "War Machine"
8. "Young and Wasted"
9. "I've Had Enough (Into the Fire)"
10. "I Love It Loud"
11. "I Still Love You"
12. "Creatures of the Night"
13. "Love Gun"
14. "Rock and Roll All Nite"

Encore

15. "Lick It Up"
16. "Black Diamond"

=== North America set list ===
1. "Detroit Rock City"
2. "Cold Gin"
3. "Creatures of the Night"
4. "Fits Like a Glove"
5. "Heaven's on Fire"
6. "Under the Gun"
7. "War Machine"
8. "Young and Wasted"
9. "I Love It Loud"
10. "I Still Love You"
11. "Love Gun"
12. "Black Diamond"

Encore

13. "Lick It Up"
14. "Rock and Roll All Nite"

== Tour dates ==
Date	City	Country	Venue	Opening Act(s)
Europe
September 30, 1984	Brighton	England	Brighton Centre	Bon Jovi
October 1, 1984	Southampton	England	Gaumont Theatre	Bon Jovi
October 2, 1984	St Austell	England	Cornwall Coliseum	Bon Jovi
October 4, 1984	Manchester	England	Manchester Apollo	Bon Jovi
October 5, 1984	Glasgow	Scotland	Glasgow Apollo	Bon Jovi
October 6, 1984	Edinburgh	Scotland	Edinburgh Playhouse	Bon Jovi
October 7, 1984	Newcastle upon Tyne	England	Newcastle City Hall	Bon Jovi
October 8, 1984	Newcastle upon Tyne	England	Newcastle City Hall	Bon Jovi
October 10, 1984	Leicester	England	De Montfort Hall	Bon Jovi
October 11, 1984	Ipswich	England	Gaumont Theater	Bon Jovi
October 12, 1984	Stafford	England	Bingley Hall	Bon Jovi
October 13, 1984	Leeds	England	Queen's Hall	Bon Jovi
October 14, 1984	London	England	Wembley Arena	Bon Jovi
October 15, 1984	London	England	Wembley Arena	Bon Jovi
October 17, 1984	Offenbach am Main	West Germany	Stadthalle Offenbach	Bon Jovi
October 18, 1984	Munich	West Germany	Circus Krone	Bon Jovi
October 19, 1984	Neunkirchen am Brand	West Germany	Hemmerleinhalle	Bon Jovi
October 21, 1984	Copenhagen	Denmark	Falkoner Center	Bon Jovi
October 22, 1984	Drammen	Norway	Drammenshallen	—
October 24, 1984	Lund	Sweden	Olympen	—
October 26, 1984	Stockholm	Sweden	Johanneshovs Isstadion	Bon Jovi
October 27, 1984	Gothenburg	Sweden	Scandinavium	Bon Jovi
October 29, 1984	Hanover	West Germany	Stadionsporthalle	Bon Jovi
October 30, 1984	Düsseldorf	West Germany	Philipshalle	Bon Jovi
October 31, 1984	Ludwigshafen	West Germany	Friedrich-Ebert-Halle	Bon Jovi
November 1, 1984	Lausanne	Switzerland	Palais de Beaulieu	Bon Jovi
November 3, 1984	Brussels	Belgium	Forest National	Bon Jovi
November 4, 1984	Zwolle	Netherlands	IJsselhallen	Bon Jovi
November 5, 1984	Paris	France	Zénith de Paris	Bon Jovi
North America
November 15, 1984	Bethlehem	United States	Stabler Arena	Queensrÿche
November 16, 1984	Glens Falls	United States	Glens Falls Civic Center	Queensrÿche
November 17, 1984	Rochester	United States	Rochester Community War Memorial	Queensrÿche
November 18, 1984	Buffalo	United States	Buffalo Memorial Auditorium	Queensrÿche
November 20, 1984	Syracuse	United States	Onondaga County War Memorial	Queensrÿche
November 23, 1984	Worcester	United States	The Centrum	Queensrÿche
November 24, 1984	New Haven	United States	New Haven Coliseum	Queensrÿche
November 25, 1984	Philadelphia	United States	The Spectrum	Queensrÿche
November 26, 1984	Uniondale	United States	Nassau Veterans Memorial Coliseum	Queensrÿche
November 27, 1984	Baltimore	United States	Baltimore Civic Center^{1}	Queensrÿche
November 28, 1984	Poughkeepsie	United States	Mid-Hudson Civic Center^{2}	Queensrÿche
November 29, 1984	Binghamton	United States	Broome County Veterans Memorial Arena^{2}	Queensrÿche
December 2, 1984	Indianapolis	United States	Market Square Arena^{3}	Queensrÿche
December 4, 1984	St. Louis	United States	Kiel Auditorium	Queensrÿche
December 5, 1984	Evansville	United States	Roberts Municipal Stadium	Queensrÿche
December 6, 1984	Terre Haute	United States	Hulman Center	Queensrÿche
December 7, 1984	Fort Wayne	United States	Allen County War Memorial Coliseum	Queensrÿche
December 8, 1984	Detroit	United States	Cobo Arena^{4}	Queensrÿche
December 11, 1984	Saginaw	United States	Saginaw Civic Center	Queensrÿche
December 12, 1984	Columbus	United States	Ohio Center	Queensrÿche
December 13, 1984	Dayton	United States	Hara Arena	Queensrÿche
December 14, 1984	Richfield	United States	Richfield Coliseum	Queensrÿche
December 15, 1984	Louisville	United States	Commonwealth Convention Center	Queensrÿche
December 17, 1984	Peoria	United States	Peoria Civic Center	Queensrÿche
December 18, 1984	Cedar Rapids	United States	Five Seasons Center	Queensrÿche
December 26, 1984	Kansas City	United States	Kansas City Municipal Auditorium	Queensrÿche
December 27, 1984	Lincoln	United States	Pershing Auditorium	Queensrÿche
December 29, 1984	Saint Paul	United States	St. Paul Civic Center	Queensrÿche
December 30, 1984	Milwaukee	United States	MECCA Arena	Queensrÿche
January 3, 1985	Greenville	United States	Greenville Memorial Auditorium	Krokus
January 4, 1985	Johnson City	United States	Freedom Hall Civic Center	Krokus
January 5, 1985	Fayetteville	United States	Cumberland County Memorial Arena	Krokus
January 6, 1985	Charlotte	United States	Charlotte Coliseum	Krokus
January 8, 1985	Knoxville	United States	Knoxville Civic Coliseum	Krokus
January 9, 1985	Atlanta	United States	The Omni Coliseum	Krokus
January 10, 1985	Orlando	United States	Orlando Sports Stadium	Krokus
January 11, 1985	Fort Lauderdale	United States	Sunrise Musical Theater	Krokus
January 12, 1985	Fort Lauderdale	United States	Sunrise Musical Theater	Krokus
January 13, 1985	St. Petersburg	United States	Bayfront Center	Krokus
January 15, 1985	New Orleans	United States	Kiefer UNO Lakefront Arena	Krokus
January 16, 1985	Biloxi	United States	Mississippi Coast Coliseum	Krokus
January 17, 1985	Huntsville	United States	Von Braun Civic Center	Krokus
January 18, 1985	Birmingham	United States	Boutwell Memorial Auditorium	Krokus
January 19, 1985	Nashville	United States	Nashville Municipal Auditorium	Krokus
January 21, 1985	Pensacola	United States	Pensacola Civic Center	Krokus
January 22, 1985	Memphis	United States	Mid-South Coliseum	Krokus
January 24, 1985	Lubbock	United States	Lubbock Municipal Coliseum	Queensrÿche
January 25, 1985	Abilene	United States	Taylor County Expo Center	Queensrÿche
January 26, 1985	Austin	United States	Frank Erwin Center	Queensrÿche
January 27, 1985	Corpus Christi	United States	Corpus Christi Memorial Coliseum	Queensrÿche
January 29, 1985	Dallas	United States	Reunion Arena	Queensrÿche
January 30, 1985	San Antonio	United States	HemisFair Arena	Queensrÿche
January 31, 1985	Houston	United States	Sam Houston Coliseum	Queensrÿche
February 1, 1985	Waco	United States	Waco Convention Center	Queensrÿche
February 3, 1985	Odessa	United States	Ector County Coliseum	Queensrÿche
February 4, 1985	Amarillo	United States	Amarillo Civic Center	Queensrÿche
February 5, 1985	El Paso	United States	El Paso County Coliseum	Queensrÿche
February 6, 1985	Phoenix	United States	Arizona Veterans Memorial Coliseum	Queensrÿche
February 7, 1985	Las Vegas	United States	Aladdin Theatre	Queensrÿche
February 9, 1985	Oakland	United States	Kaiser Convention Center	Queensrÿche
February 11, 1985	Salt Lake City	United States	Salt Palace	Queensrÿche
February 13, 1985	Seattle	United States	Seattle Center Arena	Queensrÿche
February 14, 1985	Portland	United States	Portland Memorial Coliseum	Queensrÿche
February 17, 1985	Long Beach	United States	Long Beach Arena	Queensrÿche
February 18, 1985	Long Beach	United States	Long Beach Arena	Queensrÿche
February 20, 1985	San Bernardino	United States	Orange Pavilion	Queensrÿche
February 21, 1985	Bakersfield	United States	Bakersfield Convention Center	Queensrÿche
February 22, 1985	San Diego	United States	San Diego Sports Arena	Queensrÿche
February 24, 1985	Sacramento	United States	Sacramento Memorial Auditorium	Queensrÿche
February 26, 1985	Spokane	United States	Spokane Coliseum	Queensrÿche
February 27, 1985	Vancouver	Canada	Pacific Coliseum	Queensrÿche
March 1, 1985	Edmonton	Canada	Kinsmen Field House	Sentinel
March 2, 1985	Lethbridge	Canada	Sportplex	Queensrÿche
March 3, 1985	Calgary	Canada	Stampede Corral	Queensrÿche
March 7, 1985	Regina	Canada	Regina Agridome	Dokken
March 9, 1985	Winnipeg	Canada	Winnipeg Arena	Dokken
March 10, 1985	Grand Forks	United States	Hyslop Sports Center	Dokken
March 11, 1985	Bismarck	United States	Bismarck Civic Center	Dokken
March 13, 1985	Duluth	United States	Duluth Arena	Dokken
March 14, 1985	Green Bay	United States	Brown County Veterans Memorial Arena	Dokken
March 15, 1985	La Crosse	United States	La Crosse Center	Dokken
March 16, 1985	Dubuque	United States	Five Flags Center	Dokken
March 17, 1985	Des Moines	United States	Iowa Veterans Memorial Auditorium	Dokken
March 19, 1985	Madison	United States	Dane County Expo Coliseum	W.A.S.P.
March 20, 1985	Marquette	United States	Lakeview Arena	W.A.S.P.
March 22, 1985	Lansing	United States	Lansing Civic Center	W.A.S.P.
March 23, 1985	South Bend	United States	Athletic & Convocation Center	W.A.S.P.
March 24, 1985	Cincinnati	United States	Cincinnati Gardens	W.A.S.P.
March 25, 1985	Toledo	United States	Toledo Sports Arena	W.A.S.P.
March 26, 1985	Pittsburgh	United States	Pittsburgh Civic Arena	W.A.S.P.
March 28, 1985	Springfield	United States	Springfield Civic Center	W.A.S.P.
March 29, 1985	East Rutherford	United States	Brendan Byrne Arena	W.A.S.P.

- ^Note 1 Bruce Kulick performed the first half of this show and Mark St. John performed the second half.
- ^Note 2 Mark St. John performed the entirety of these shows.
- ^Note 3 This was Bruce Kulick's first show as a permanent member of the group.
- ^Note 4 This show was professionally recorded and shown on MTV, then later released as Animalize Live Uncensored.

=== Box office score data ===
List of box office score data with date, city, venue, attendance, gross, references
Date (1984)	City	Venue	Attendance	Gross	Ref(s)
November 15	Bethlehem	Stabler Arena	4,472 / 6,000	$49,346	
December 2	Indianapolis	Market Square Arena	10,393 / 10,500	$111,865	
December 4	St. Louis	Kiel Auditorium	4,380 / 5,700	$54,533	

== Personnel ==
- Paul Stanley – vocals, rhythm guitar
- Gene Simmons – vocals, bass
- Eric Carr – drums, vocals
- Bruce Kulick – lead guitar, backing vocals (all but November 28 and 29 dates)
- Mark St. John – lead guitar, backing vocals (only November 27, 28, and 29 dates)
