= Exposed (Kiss video) =

1987 long form music video by Kiss

Video by Kiss
- Released: May 18, 1987
- Recorded: 1975–1987
- Genre: Hard rock
- Length: 90 minutes
- Label: PolyGram Video
- Director: Claude Borenzweig

Kiss chronology
Animalize Live Uncensored (1985)	Exposed (1987)	Crazy Nights (1989)

Kiss Exposed is the 1987 long-form music video released by the American rock band Kiss. Directed by Claude Borenzweig, this was the band's second home video release. KISS Exposed is based on an interview with the members of Kiss (almost exclusively Gene Simmons and Paul Stanley) and is interspersed with music videos and live concert clips from throughout Kiss' career, until the album Asylum.

The original idea had been to put together a simple compilation of the promo videos the band had filmed since 1982 but according to interviews with Paul he felt that such a product wasn't right: "The new video, KISS Exposed, came out of the record company wanting to put out a compilation of our videos. And I always see that stuff as a rip-off. In essence, what they are doing is having the public pay the company back for the cost of the videos." Instead, Kiss suggested a look behind the scenes/history of the band. According to Len Epand, the executive producer for the video and the senior vice president of music video production at PolyGram, "Gene Simmons and Paul Stanley were responsible for much of the idea and its execution and even came up with the title. […] When we brought the concept to Kiss, they upped the ante by giving us the rights to classic pre-video-age concert cuts from their own archives, from when they still wore make-up". The conceptual footage that tied the promo videos and live clips together was filmed at Gray Hall, a mansion in Beverly Hills, in August 1986.

The première showing of the completed product was at Billboard’s Eighth Annual Video Music Conference on November 20–22, 1986. It was described as "an original music/comedy/docu-drama". Final post-production work was undertaken in December 1986 at Sync Sound in New York for a January 1987 release. "Kiss have[has] now finished work on a 90-minute video package which they plan to issue worldwide in January ’87". However, this release date was soon pushed to March, something Gene and Paul referenced when they were guest VJs at MTV in January 1987. This March release date explains why KISS Exposed was listed as a new release in several US newspapers in mid-to-late March.

However, PolyGram pushed the release even further and it was eventually released on May 18. 1987. Whether or not it was the reason for the delays, Billboard wrote that PolyGram was "timing the videocassette […] to coincide with the compact disk release of the remainder of the Kiss catalog". Regardless of the reason for the moving release date it worked to drum up interest. According to an ad placed in Billboard in mid-April the video was set to ship gold (25,000 units) but the veracity of that early ad might be questioned. In an interview slightly closer to the actual release date representatives for PolyGram said that pre-orders were "approaching 25,000". (RIAA certification thresholds for long-form video have changed since the late 80s, in 1987 gold was 25,000 units and platinum was 50,000 units.) It was certified for gold status on July 23, 1987, and later platinum on October 1, 1987. Certifications always lag (and have to be asked for by the releasing label) and sales over 50,000 were reported long before the actual certification. In late 1988 Len Epand would claim sales approaching 90,000.

Adult film actress Candie Evans (in black bikini on right side of photo) is visible as one of the models in the cover art.

== Track listing ==
No.	Title	Writer(s)	Length
1.	"Who Wants to Be Lonely" (video)	Paul Stanley, Desmond Child, Jean Beauvoir
2.	"Uh! All Night" (video)	Stanley, Child, Beauvoir
3.	"I Love It Loud" (live, June 18, 1983 - Rio de Janeiro, Brazil)	Gene Simmons, Vinnie Vincent
4.	"Deuce" (live, January 31, 1975 - San Francisco, California)	Simmons
5.	"Strutter" (live, January 25, 1976 - Detroit, Michigan)	Stanley, Simmons
6.	"Beth" (live, September 1977 - Houston, Texas)	Peter Criss, Stan Penridge, Bob Ezrin
7.	"Detroit Rock City" (live, 1980 - Australia)	Stanley, Ezrin
8.	"Tears Are Falling" (video)	Stanley
9.	"Lick It Up" (video)	Stanley, Vincent
10.	"All Hell’s Breakin' Loose" (video)	Eric Carr, Stanley, Simmons, Vincent
11.	"I Love It Loud" (video)	Simmons, Vincent
12.	"I Stole Your Love" (live, September 1977 - Houston, Texas)	Stanley
13.	"Heaven’s on Fire" (video)	Stanley, Desmond Child
14.	"Ladies Room" (live, September 1977 - Houston, Texas)	Simmons
15.	"Rock and Roll All Nite" (live, 1980 - Australia)	Stanley, Simmons

== Certifications ==
Region	Certification	Certified units/sales
Canada (Music Canada)	Platinum	10,000^{^}
United States (RIAA)	Platinum	100,000^{^}
^{^} Shipments figures based on certification alone.
