= Unfinished Business (Eric Carr album) =

Studio album by Eric Carr
- Released: November 8, 2011
- Recorded: 1980s; 2000s
- Genre: Hard rock; heavy metal
- Length: 43:28
- Label: Auto Rock Records

Eric Carr chronology
Rockology (1999)	Unfinished Business (2011)

Unfinished Business is an album by drummer Eric Carr. It is his second posthumous release, after Rockology.

== Track listing ==
No.	Title	Writer(s)	Length
1.	"Eric Speaks to the Fans" (Dialogue)		0:06
2.	"Just Can't Wait" (Performed by Ted Poley)	Eric Carr, Bruce Kulick, Adam Mitchell, Nick Clemente	3:55
3.	"Troubles Inside You"	Carr, Mitch Weissman	2:28
4.	"No One's Messin' with You"	Carr	3:14
5.	"Eric Talks About His Music" (Dialogue)		0:14
6.	"Carr Jam 1981" (Performed by Joey Cassata and Benny Doro)	Carr	3:11
7.	"Eric Talks About His Audition" (Dialogue)		0:17
8.	"Shandi"	Paul Stanley, Vini Poncia	3:55
9.	"All Hell's Breakin' Loose" (Performed by ZO2)	Carr, Gene Simmons, Stanley, Vinnie Vincent	4:28
10.	"Dial L for Love" (Instrumental)	Carr, Mitchell	2:52
11.	"Elephant Man"	Carr, Nick Clemente, Bob Gilmartin	3:59
12.	"Eric Talks About Mark St. John" (Dialogue)		0:15
13.	"Midnite Stranger" (Instrumental)	Carr	2:22
14.	"Eyes of Love"	Carr, Kulick, Mitchell	3:47
15.	"Bill Aucoin Talks About Eric" (Dialogue)		0:41
16.	"Through the Years (Live)" (Instrumental)	Carr	5:06
17.	"I Cry at Night"	Carr	2:07
18.	"Eric Joking at Rehearsals" (Dialogue)		0:34
Total length:			43:28

=== Deluxe edition ===
No.	Title	Writer(s)	Length
19.	"I Found You (The One I Adore)"	Bob Dorsey & Harry Simon	2:29
20.	"Down by the River"	Eric Carr, Bryan Adams & Jim Vallance	7:37
21.	"Get Down" (Studio Version)	John Henderson	8:22
22.	"Black Magic Woman"	Peter Green	5:33
23.	"Listen to the Music"	Tom Johnston	6:31
