= White Tiger (band) =

American glam metal band

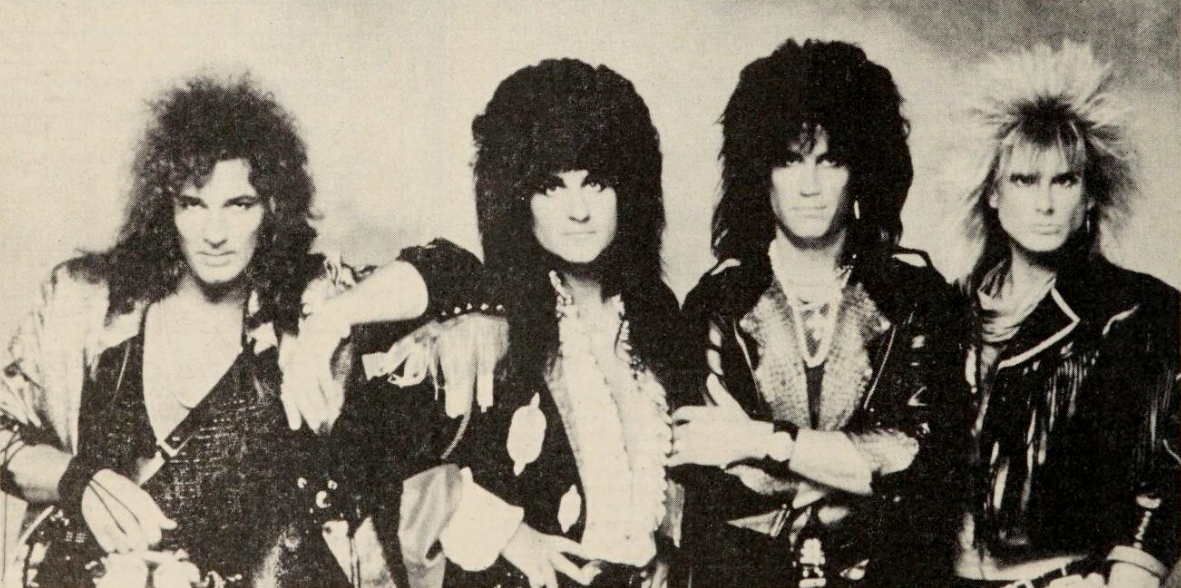
- L-R: David Donato, Mark St. John, Michael Norton, Brian James Fox

Background information
- Origin: California
- Genres: Hard rock; heavy metal; glam metal; rock; glam rock
- Years active: 1985–1988, 1998
- Label: ECM
- Past members: Mark St. John; David Donato; Michael Norton; Brian James Fox

White Tiger was a short-lived glam metal band from the United States, founded by former Kiss band member Mark St. John, which split up in 1988. The group also included former Black Sabbath member David Donato, as well as bassist Michael Norton and drummer Brian James Fox. They recorded only one album, and demos for a second album.

Mark died on April 5, 2007, the age of 51. Donato died in February 2021. Mark's brother and the bassist for the band, Michael Norton, died in 2023.

== Biography ==
=== Beginning ===
St. John (Mark Norton), practiced as a guitar teacher before being contacted by Kiss in 1984, after being recommended by well-known guitar maker Grover Jackson, to replace Vinnie Vincent, who had just been fired from the band. From this period, Norton became known to the public under the name on Mark St. John. With Kiss, St. John participated in the recordings of the album Animalize (Kiss's best-selling album of the 80s), but in December of the same year, after having participated in three dates of the world tour, he was replaced by Bruce Kulick for health reasons after contracting a rare form of arthritis, according to Kiss' management.

Donato joined Black Sabbath in 1984 to replace Ian Gillan, and was fired in 1985 after recording some demos with the band, after just six months, for reasons that are not fully understood. Prior to this experience Donato, who had previously worked as a model, had been a member of the British Armageddon (but based in Los Angeles) in the mid-1970s, with which he recorded a self-titled debut in 1975, before the death of its founder Keith Relf (former lead singer of The Yardbirds). After these, he joined the band Hero founded by Neil Citron who was briefly guitarist for Quiet Riot.

== White Tiger ==
=== Creation of White Tiger ===
White Tiger was formed in early 1986 by St. John, his brother Michael Norton, Donato, and drummer Brian James Fox. The bandbore some similarity in appearance and sound to the eighties-era hair metal Kiss. A few months later, after signing with E.M.C Records, they released the self-titled debut White Tiger, which while receiving praise related to songwriting, was nevertheless criticized for its poor production. In any case, it was not a significant success and went unnoticed, also because it was produced by a small label. The label, which saw no promising future for the quartet, rejected the band for lack of success. Demonstrations were recorded for a possible second album, which should have been titled On The Prowl, but was never released due to a lost record deal.

=== The end ===
The project, seeing no future, was interrupted in 1989. St. John founded the band Keep composed of St. John, singer Michael McDonald (under the pseudonym Michael Donato), guitarist Kevin Russell, bassist Joey Mudarri and original Kiss drummer Peter Criss. After briefly switching bass with Jim Barnes, St. John reintroduced his brother Michael in January 1990. This incarnation of Keep, which included almost all the members of White Tiger, recorded some demos and attended some concerts in California. However, the label began to distance itself from the band due to the rise of the grunge movement that radically changed the musical trends of the time. Subsequently, the band disbanded in 1991 when Peter Criss founded his project titled "Criss".

== Later years ==
=== Brief reunion and Mark St. John Project ===
St. John later worked with Stevie Wonder and David Hasselhoff. Brother Michael Norton joined the Laidlaw band releasing the albums Sample This (1998) and First Big Picnic (1999). Later, Fox joined Silent Rage, ironically signing with the label owned by Gene Simmons, known as Kiss bassist and founding member. With them, the drummer released the album Still Alive in 2002. In 1998, St. John reformed White Tiger. After playing for a few dates in Los Angeles, the band finally broke up. In the same 1999 the debut of White Tiger was reissued with the addition of a bonus track. St. John will then undertake his solo project called "Mark St. John Project" first recording the eponymous EP Mark St. John Project in 1999 in which he participated in the composition of some Peter Criss songs, and then in 2003 the second Magic Bullet Theory.

St. John was reported to have died on April 5, 2007, of a brain hemorrhage. He was 51 years old.

=== Rare demo tape of White Tiger sold ===
A rare 1988 demo tape from White Tiger, Mark St. John's band, was sold on eBay for $608.00. Songs included are "Wild Wild Women", "Communicator", "Where Did Our Love Go", and "Face the Love".

=== Live video posts ===
Brian James Fox, former drummer of White Tiger, has announced that he is working on old material of the group recorded live (he has not specified if in audio or video) to publish it on Facebook and YouTube.

== Discography ==
=== Studio albums ===
- 1986 - White Tiger

=== Compilations ===
- Rock Warriors
- Live to Rock

=== Live ===
- 1987 - Live in Anaheim

== Track list ==
=== White Tiger ===
1. "Rock Warriors" - 5:28
2. "Love/Hate" - 5:51
3. "Bad Time Coming" - 6:01
4. "Runaway" - 5:00
5. "Still Standing Strong" - 5:26
6. "Live To Rock" - 4:09
7. "Northern Wind" - 5:13
8. "Stand And Deliver" - 4:38
9. "White Hot Desire" - 4:36

== Members ==
- David Donato - lead vocals
- Mark St. John - guitars, backing vocals
- Michael Norton - bass, backing vocals
- Brian James Fox - drums, backing vocals
