= Let's Put the X in Sex =

Single by Kiss

from the album Smashes, Thrashes & Hits
- B-side: "Calling Dr. Love"
- Released: October 11, 1988
- Recorded: 1988
- Studio: Right Track, New York City
- Genre: Glam metal
- Length: 3:48
- Label: Mercury (US)
- Songwriters: Paul Stanley, Desmond Child
- Producer: Paul Stanley

Kiss singles chronology
"Turn On the Night" (1988)	"Let's Put the X in Sex" (1988)	"(You Make Me) Rock Hard" (1988)

Music video
- "Let's Put the X in Sex" on YouTube

"Let's Put the X in Sex" is a song by the American rock band Kiss from their 1988 greatest hits album Smashes, Thrashes & Hits. The song is the album's first track and was released as its lead single.

== Background and writing ==
"Let's Put the X in Sex" is one of two new songs on the Kiss greatest hits album Smashes, Thrashes & Hits released in 1988, the other being "(You Make Me) Rock Hard".

The song was written by Paul Stanley and his frequent collaborator Desmond Child.

Both "Let's Put the X in Sex" and "(You Make Me) Rock Hard" were recorded by Paul Stanley on his own in July 1988 at New York's Right Track Studios. According to The Official Price Guide to Kiss Collectibles by Ingo Floren, the two songs let some fans wonder about the new musical direction of the band" because they "were produced with lots of keyboards over a dance-orientated beat".

== Reception ==
The song was released in the United States in October 1988 as the first single from the album Smashes, Thrashes & Hits. The promotional 12" vinyl version had several remixes that were intended to be radio-friendly. Contemporary reviewers described the song as "typical" of Kiss' material.

== Composition ==
Brett Weiss' Encyclopedia of KISS describes the song as "a typically fine, typically flamboyant performance by Paul Stanley", which "begins the record [the album] on a party-heavy note". The lyrics are tongue-in-cheek. The beat is, according to the same encyclopedia, "semi-catchy". The book also notes that some people compare this Kiss song to "Addicted to Love" by Robert Palmer.

== Personnel ==
- Paul Stanley – lead vocals, rhythm guitar, bass, drum machine programming (hi-hat and kick drum only)
- Bruce Kulick – lead guitar, backing vocals
- Eric Carr – drums, percussion, backing vocals
- Phil Ashley – keyboards

== Charts ==
Chart (1989)	Peak position
Australia (ARIA)	49
US Billboard Hot 100	97

== See also ==
- 1988 in music
