= List of awards and nominations received by Kiss =

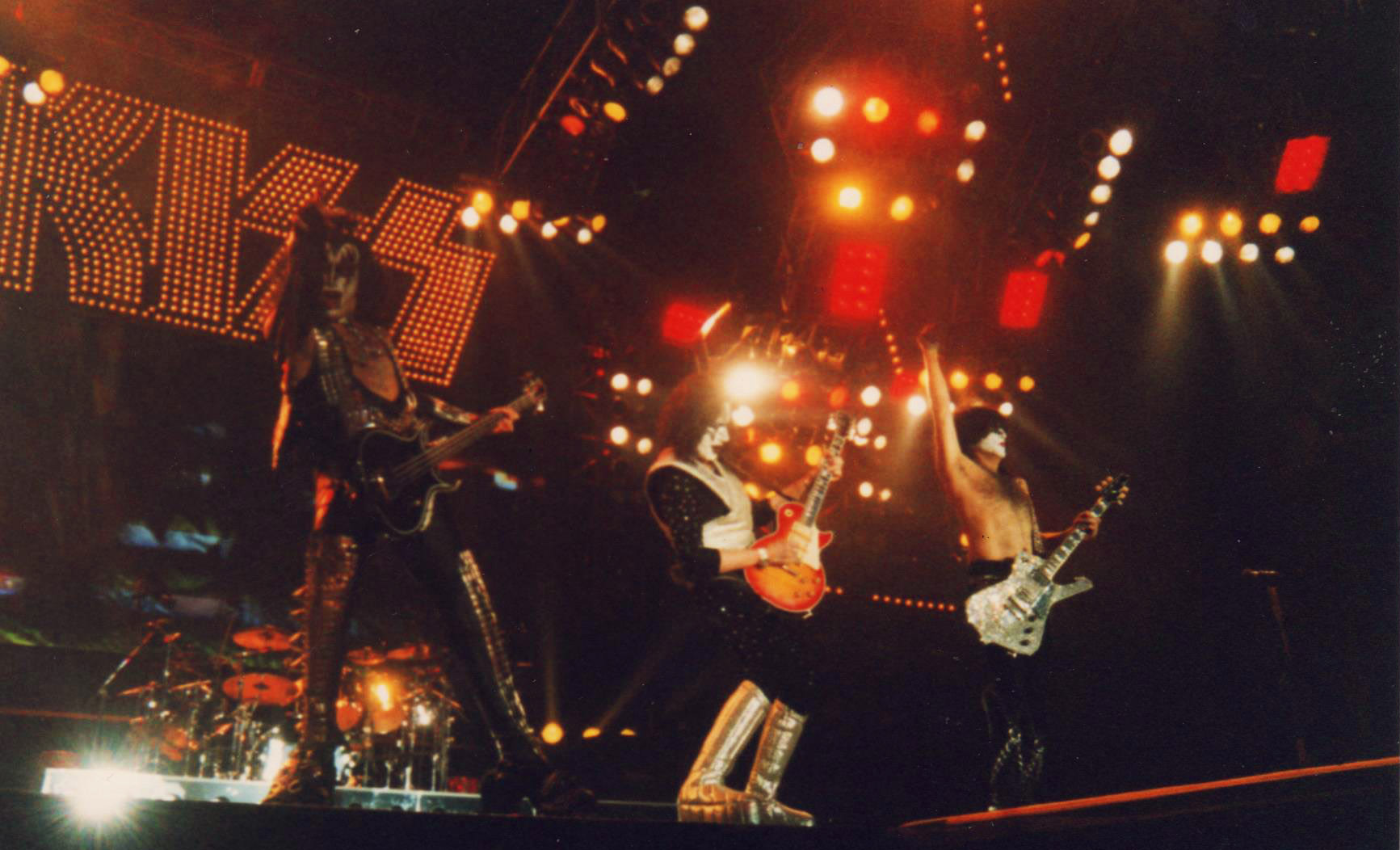
Kiss performing in 1997

== Classic Rock Roll of Honour Awards ==
Year	Nominee / work	Award	Result
2007	Kiss Alive! 1975-2000	Best Reissue	Won
2008	Paul Stanley	Showman Award	Won

== Grammy Awards ==
The Grammy Awards are awarded annually by the National Academy of Recording Arts and Sciences. Kiss has received one award nomination.

Year	Nominee / work	Award	Result
1999	"Psycho Circus"	Best Hard Rock Performance	Nominated

== Metal Edge Readers' Choice Awards ==
Year	Winner	Award
1996	Kiss	Band of the Year
1996	Kiss	Best Metal/Hard Rock Band
1996	Kiss	Best Concert Performance
1996	Kiss	Best Concert Tour
1996	Paul Stanley	Best Vocalist
1996	Gene Simmons	Best Bassist
1996	Ace Frehley	Best Guitarist
1996	Kiss Unplugged	Best Video Cassette
1997	"Jungle"	Song of the Year
1998	Psycho Circus	Album of the Year
1998	Psycho Circus	Song of the Year
1998	Psycho Circus	Best Video Clip
1998	Second Coming	Best Video Cassette
1998	Kiss	Best Concert Performance
1998	Gene Simmons	Best Bassist
2000	Kiss	Stage Show of the Year

== MTV Video Music Awards ==
The MTV Video Music Awards is an annual awards ceremony established in 1984 by MTV. Kiss has received one nomination.

Year	Nominee / work	Award	Result
1984	"All Hell's Breakin' Loose"	Best Cinematography	Nominated

== People's Choice Awards ==
The People's Choice Awards is an awards show recognizing the people and the work of popular culture. Kiss has received one award to date, for the song "Beth" in 1977.

Year	Nominee / work	Award	Result
1977	"Beth"	Favorite New Song	Won

== Rock and Roll Hall of Fame ==
The Rock and Roll Hall of Fame is a museum and award show dedicated to honoring the history and cultural impact of rock and roll. Kiss was inducted into the Rock and Roll Hall of Fame on April 10, 2014

Year	Nominee / work	Award	Result
2014	Kiss	Rock and Roll Hall of Fame inductee	Won
