= David Donato (singer) =

American singer (1954–2021)

- Born: David Thomas Donato; March 21, 1954
- Died: February 2, 2021 (aged 66)
- Genres: Heavy metal; hard rock
- Occupation: Vocalist
- Years active: 1984-1990?
- Formerly of: Black Sabbath; White Tiger; The Keep

David Thomas Donato (March 21, 1954 - February 2, 2021) was an American singer known for his involvement in Black Sabbath. He recorded several demos with the band and rehearsed throughout 1984 and 1985.

== Career ==
=== Black Sabbath ===
"After Gillan, we were living out in America, in LA again," recalled guitarist Tony Iommi. "We were auditioning all sorts of different singers… and this Dave Donato was one of the ones who we did try a few times… He seemed to look alright and whatever else, and seemed to be okay, but it was just auditions. We never actually had him in, as a part of the band. But it happened that Kerrang! or somebody came out to do an interview and, of course, he was there at the time, and they took a picture of everybody. So automatically this guy suddenly becomes part of the band – according to everybody else."

Contrary to reports, Donato was not fired after an interview with Kerrang!. The band soon fell apart, and Iommi formed an entirely new Sabbath the following year.

The Donato demos – containing songs such as "No Way Out", "Dancing with the Devil", "Don't Beg the Master" and "Sail On" – remain out of the public domain, but a 1984 rehearsal session featuring Donato, Tony Iommi, Geezer Butler, and Bill Ward surfaced online in 2006. This was produced by Bob Ezrin.

=== White Tiger ===
After Sabbath, Donato joined the glam metal band White Tiger with former Kiss guitarist Mark St. John, who was in a band with Donato prior to joining Kiss.

After releasing their first self-titled album, a seven-track demo was recorded in 1988; the intention was to record a second album but White Tiger split up before the album was ever completed.

== Later career ==
In 1990, Donato joined The Keep founded by former Kiss members Peter Criss and his former White Tiger bandmate St. John. This lineup was essentially White Tiger, except for Criss replacing Brian James Fox on drums.

They only performed live just once, on May 2, 1990 at a drum clinic at the Guitar Center music store in Lawndale, California.

== Death ==
David Donato died on February 2, 2021, after a long illness. He is interred at Forest Lawn in Cypress, CA.

== Discography ==
=== Album ===
- White Tiger (1986)
