= Rock Hard =

Rock Hard may refer to:

- "Rock Hard" (song), a 1984 song by the Beastie Boys
- Rock Hard, a 1980 album by Suzi Quatro
- Rock Hard (magazine), a German music magazine
  - Rock Hard Festival, a heavy metal festival sponsored by the above magazine
- "(You Make Me) Rock Hard", a 1988 song by Kiss
- "Rock hard", a descriptor often used for ab muscles or an erection

== See also ==
- Rock (geology)
- Hardness
