= Jim LeClair =

American football player (1950–2019)

No. 55
- Position: Linebacker

Personal information
- Born: October 30, 1950; Saint Paul, Minnesota, U.S.
- Died: November 4, 2019 (aged 69); Mayville, North Dakota, U.S.
- Listed height: 6 ft 3 in (1.91 m)
- Listed weight: 234 lb (106 kg)

Career information
- High school: South St. Paul (South St. Paul, Minnesota)
- College: Minnesota Crookston (1968–1969); North Dakota (1970–1971)
- NFL draft: 1972: 3rd round, 54th overall pick

Career history

Playing
- Cincinnati Bengals (1972–1983); New Jersey Generals (1984–1985)

Coaching
- Mayville State (1986–1988) Head coach

Awards and highlights
- All-USFL (1984); Pro Bowl (1976); Cincinnati Bengals 50th Anniversary Team; First-team Little All-American (1971); NCC Most Valuable Player (1971); First-team All-NCC (1971)

Career NFL statistics
- Sacks: 7.5
- Interceptions: 10
- Interception yards: 64
- Fumble recoveries: 10
- Defensive touchdowns: 1
- Stats at Pro Football Reference

Head coaching record
- Career: 6–21 (.222)
- College Football Hall of Fame

James Michael LeClair (October 30, 1950 – November 4, 2019) was an American football player and coach. He played as a linebacker for 12 seasons, from 1972 to 1983, in the National Football League (NFL) with the Cincinnati Bengals and two seasons, from 1984 to 1985, in the United States Football League (USFL) with the New Jersey Generals. LeClair played college football for the Minnesota Crookston Golden Eagles and the North Dakota Fighting Sioux. He served as the head football coach at Mayville State University, from 1986 to 1988. LeClair was inducted into the College Football Hall of Fame as a player in 1999.

== Early life ==
LeClair attended South St. Paul High School in South St. Paul, Minnesota, where he was a standout football player and wrestler for the Packers from 1966 to 1968.

== College career ==
LeClair enrolled at the University of Minnesota Crookston where he played football and wrestled for the Trojans from 1968 to 1970. He was named MCCC Minnesota College Athletic Conference All-Conference and NJCAA All-Region in football and ranked first in Minnesota and fourth in the nation in wrestling during the 1970–1971 season. He also captained both teams. He led the 1968 football team to a 6- 2 record that was at one time ranked nationally. They won the Northern Conference Title of the Minnesota Junior College League. He was named to the NCJAA All-Region and All Minnesota football teams.

LeClair was also an outstanding wrestler during his two years at UMC. He finished his final year at UMC with a record of 25–2 in the 190-pound division. In addition to being captain of the wrestling team, he finished his final season ranked fourth in the nation, first in the state and outstanding wrestler in three tourneys.

LeClair then played college football for two years at the University of North Dakota, where as a senior, he was named Little All-American in 1971 as he recorded 187 tackles, three interceptions, four fumble recoveries fumbles, and 11 forced fumbles for the Fighting Sioux. He was also a two-time All-North Central Conference honoree and he was named the league's most valuable defensive lineman in 1971.

He earned a bachelor's degree in education in 1971.

== Professional career ==
LeClair was selected in the third round (54th overall) of the 1972 NFL draft by the Cincinnati Bengals.

He spent the next three years mainly as a starter on special teams and as a backup linebacker. He became a starter on defense in 1975 and remained so for the rest of his career (nine seasons through 1983). He was named to the Pro Bowl in 1976.

In 1981, he was a starting linebacker on the Bengals team which won the AFC Championship Game dubbed "The Freezer Bowl", the coldest game in NFL history, won by the Bengals over the San Diego Chargers, 27–7. He then played in Super Bowl XVI, which the Bengals lost to the San Francisco 49ers, 26–21.

The 1983 season was the last of his 12-year NFL career, which included 10 interceptions and 10 fumble recoveries.

After leaving the NFL, LeClair played for two seasons with the New Jersey Generals of the USFL.

== Honors ==
LeClair was elected to the College Football Hall of Fame in 1999. LeClair was inducted to the Minnesota College Athletic Conference Hall of Fame in 1975. LeClair is a member of the University of Minnesota, Crookston Hall of Fame inaugural class of 1999. He was inducted into the University of North Dakota Athletic Hall of Fame in 1985, and he was one of two inaugural inductees into the South St. Paul High School Hall of Fame in 2007. On June 21, 2014, at the Jamestown Civic Center, Jim LeClair was inducted into the North Dakota Sports Hall of Fame.

== Coaching and political careers ==
After his NFL career, LeClair became the head coach of the Mayville State University football team from 1986 to 1988. He later became the mayor of Mayville, North Dakota. He also operated an insurance agency in Mayville.

== Personal life ==
In addition to his football career, LeClair was a member of the United States Army Reserve from 1972 to 1977.

LeClair and his wife, Elizabeth (Betty), had three children, Kelli, Jamie and Andrew. LeClair died five days after his 69th birthday, on November 4, 2019, in Mayville.

== Head coaching record ==
Year	Team	Overall	Conference	Standing	Bowl/playoffs
Mayville State Comets (North Dakota College Athletic Conference) (1986–1988)
1986	Mayville State	2–7	1–4	5th	
1987	Mayville State	1–8	0–5	6th	
1988	Mayville State	3–6	1–5	T–5th	
Mayville State:		6–21	2–14		
Total:		6–21			
