= Brian James Fox =

American drummer

- Born: Brian James Fox
- Genres: Hard rock; Glam metal
- Occupation: Drummer
- Instruments: Drums; Percussion
- Formerly of: White Tiger; Silent Rage

Brian James Fox is a drummer known for his work with White Tiger and as a member of Silent Rage.

== White Tiger ==
Fox was recruited by lead guitarist and band leader Mark St. John, a former member of Kiss after being recommended to him by his guitar technician, and White Tiger bassist, Michael Norton. After the deaths of St. John in 2007, vocalist David Donato in 2021, and Norton in 2023, Fox is the band's last surviving member.

== Silent Rage ==
After the original White Tiger broke up, Fox joined the band Silent Rage, who themselves had a Kiss connection as the band's second album was signed to Gene Simmons's Simmons Records. However, after 9/11, Fox rejoined Silent Rage for a special one-time-only performance when Silent Rage was asked to reunite to play at The Salvation Army Benefit Concert in November 2001 at the Galaxy Theater in Santa Ana, California. This special benefit was organized and put on by Steve Brownlee who had signed Silent Rage for their debut album "Shattered Hearts."

== Discography ==
=== With White Tiger ===
- White Tiger (1986)

=== With Silent Rage ===
- Don't Touch Me There (1989)
- Still Alive (2001)
