= (You Make Me) Rock Hard =

Single by Kiss

from the album Smashes, Thrashes & Hits
- B-side: "Deuce"
- Released: December 1988
- Recorded: 1988
- Studio: Right Track, New York City
- Genre: Glam metal
- Length: 3:26
- Label: Mercury (US)
- Songwriters: Paul Stanley, Desmond Child, Diane Warren
- Producer: Paul Stanley

Kiss singles chronology
"Let's Put the X in Sex" (1988)	"(You Make Me) Rock Hard" (1988)	"Hide Your Heart" (1989)

Music video
- "(You Make Me) Rock Hard" on YouTube

"(You Make Me) Rock Hard" is a song by the American rock band Kiss from their 1988 greatest hits album Smashes, Thrashes & Hits. The song is the album's second track and was released as its second single.

== Background and writing ==
"(You Make Me) Rock Hard" is one of two new songs on the Kiss greatest hits album Smashes, Thrashes & Hits released in 1988, the other being "Let's Put the X in Sex". Both songs are about sex.

The song was written by Paul Stanley, Desmond Child and Diane Warren.

It was recorded by Paul Stanley on his own in July 1988 at New York's Right Track Studios. According to The Official Price Guide to Kiss Collectibles by Ingo Floren, "Let's Put the X in Sex" and "(You Make Me) Rock Hard" "let some fans wonder about the new musical direction of the band" because they "were produced with lots of keyboards over a dance-orientated beat".

The song was released in the United States as a cassette single in December 1988.

== Music video ==
Howard Johnson writing for Classic Rock ranked the song's video at No. 8 on their list of The Top 10 Best Hair Metal Videos.

== Personnel ==
- Paul Stanley – vocals, rhythm guitar, bass
- Bruce Kulick – lead guitar, backing vocals
- Eric Carr – drums, percussion, backing vocals
- Phil Ashley – keyboards
- Gene Simmons – bass
