= Rockology =

- Original cover

Studio album by Eric Carr
- Released: October 19, 1999
- Genre: Heavy metal
- Length: 47:17
- Label: Spitfire
- Producer: Bruce Kulick

Eric Carr chronology
Rockology (1999)	Unfinished Business (2011)

Alternative cover
- 2023 Record Store Day cover

Professional ratings
Review scores
Source	Rating
Allmusic	3.5/5 stars

Rockology is an album by former Kiss drummer Eric Carr released in 1999.

The album features songs that Carr was working on before his death in 1991 which was completed by his former Kiss bandmate Bruce Kulick. Several of the songs featured were intended for use on KISS albums, such as "Eyes of Love" and "Somebody's Waiting". Others were written for Carr's Rockheads animated television series that never got off the ground, such as "Too Cool For School" and "Nasty Boys".

On December 20, 2020, Rockology was re-released on Apple iTunes and on Spotify, followed by a limited-edition vinyl pressing released for Record Store Day on April 22, 2023.

== Track listing ==
All songs written by Eric Carr, Bruce Kulick and Adam Mitchell, except where noted.

=== Original release ===
No.	Title	Writer(s)	Length
1.	"Eyes of Love"		3:29
2.	"Somebody's Waiting"		3:48
3.	"Heavy Metal Baby"		4:34
4.	"Just Can't Wait"		3:56
5.	"Mad Dog"		3:16
6.	"You Make Me Crazy"		4:04
7.	"Nightmare"		4:22
8.	"Nightmare" (Live demo)		3:42
9.	"Too Cool For School"		3:59
10.	"Tiara"		4:26
11.	"Can You Feel It"		4:02
12.	"Nasty Boys"	Carr, Kulick, Mitchell, Jonathan Daniels	3:27

=== 2023 bonus tracks ===
No.	Title	Writer(s)	Length
13.	"Tiara" (Long Demo)
14.	"Can You Feel It" (Alternative Version)
15.	"Eyes of Love" (Acapella)
16.	"Ob-La-Di, Ob-La-Da"	Lennon–McCartney
17.	"Stranger"	John Henderson, Sarita Squires

== Personnel ==
- Eric Carr - drums, lead and backing vocals, keyboards, bass, acoustic guitar
- Bruce Kulick - lead and rhythm guitars
- Adam Mitchell - keyboards, backing vocals
