= Jamestown Civic Center =

Community center

Coordinates: 46.9100392°N 98.7047768°W

- Interactive map of Jamestown Civic Center
- Address: 212 3rd Avenue Northeast; Jamestown, North Dakota; United States
- Owner: City of Jamestown
- Capacity: 6,500

Construction
- Opened: 1973

Tenants
- University of Jamestown Jimmies basketball

The Jamestown Civic Center is a 6,500-seat multi-purpose arena in Jamestown, North Dakota. It was built in 1973 and has capacity to fit 6500 people. It is the former home to the University of Jamestown Jimmies basketball teams.

KISS performed at the arena during their Asylum Tour on March 14, 1986.
