= Thrills in the Night =

Single by Kiss

from the album Animalize
- B-side: "Burn Bitch Burn"
- Released: 1985 (US)
- Recorded: Right Track Studios, New York City: 1984
- Genre: Glam metal
- Length: 4:31
- Label: Mercury Records 880 535-7 (US)
- Songwriters: Paul Stanley, Jean Beauvoir
- Producer: Paul Stanley

Kiss singles chronology
"Heaven's on Fire" / "Lonely Is the Hunter" (1984)	"Thrills in the Night" / "Burn Bitch Burn" (1985)	"Tears Are Falling" / "Any Way You Slice It" (1985)

Music video
- "Thrills in the Night" on YouTube

"Thrills in the Night" is a song by the American hard rock band Kiss. Featured on the group's 1984 album Animalize, it was released as a single in 1985.

== Writing ==
The track was written by Kiss guitarist/vocalist Paul Stanley and ex-Plasmatics bassist Jean Beauvoir.

== Musical style and lyrical theme ==
According to the Encyclopedia of Kiss, the song is "part mysterious metal, part palatable pop." It is "a fantastic song filled with after-dark drama". The lyrics talk about a woman who leads a double life. She works a 9 to 5 job in a professional work environment. She also fulfills promiscuous sexual desires at night, in sharp contrast to the life she leads during the daytime.

== Musical video ==
Two videos were made to promote the song. However, only one was commercially released, which featured the band playing in front of a live audience. The clip would be the first with Kiss guitarist Bruce Kulick, who replaced the departed Mark St. John earlier in 1984.

== Studio personnel ==
- Paul Stanley – rhythm guitar, lead vocals
- Mark St. John – lead guitar
- Eric Carr – drums, percussion, backing vocals
- Jean Beauvoir – bass guitar, backing vocals
- Gene Simmons - backing vocals
