= Asylum (Kiss album) =

Studio album by Kiss
- Released: September 16, 1985
- Studios: Electric Lady and Right Track Recording, New York City
- Genres: Glam metal; pop metal
- Length: 38:50
- Label: Mercury
- Producers: Paul Stanley, Gene Simmons

Kiss chronology
| Animalize (1984) | Asylum (1985) | Crazy Nights (1987) |

Singles from Asylum
- 1. "Tears Are Falling" Released: September 9, 1985

Asylum is the thirteenth studio album by American rock band Kiss, released on September 16, 1985. The album marked a continuation of the glam metal sound of the preceding album Animalize.

== Recording ==
Asylum is the first album to feature lead guitarist Bruce Kulick as an official band member. Kulick had replaced former guitarist Mark St. John on two tracks on the previous album Animalize (1984), during the latter's absence due to personality clashes with the other band members and also to purported reactive arthritis. Subsequently, Kulick filled St. John's spot on most segments of the Animalize tour. This new lineup of Paul Stanley, Gene Simmons, Eric Carr, and Kulick would last until Carr's death in November 1991, while Kulick would stay with the band until the reunion of the original lineup in 1996.

The song "Love's a Deadly Weapon" credits Plasmatics members Rod Swenson and Wes Beech as it borrows heavily from their band's song "Party". The title and lyrics are however taken from a 1981 Kiss demo written by Paul Stanley that was officially released on the 40th Anniversary remaster of Creatures of the Night (1982).

Another Plasmatics member Jean Beauvoir is also credited as songwriter and plays bass on at least two songs.

== Cover ==
The album cover depicts the four band members with colored lips, mirroring the colors of the 1978 solo releases: red for Simmons, purple for Stanley, blue for Kulick (replacing Ace Frehley) and green for Carr (replacing Peter Criss). The placement of the band’s faces also mirrors 1979’s Dynasty cover: (clockwise from top left) Stanley, Simmons, Carr (replacing Criss), & Kulick (replacing Frehley). The artwork for the back cover is similarly stylised and colourful, depicting Kiss against a white background. The cover art of the remastered 1998 CD release of Asylum featured slightly altered, bolder colours than that of the original release.

== Singles ==
"Tears Are Falling" was the only track to be released for retail sales as a single and was a hit for the band, with the video, in particular, proving popular on MTV. A total of three music videos for the album were filmed on set in London, England, for the songs "Who Wants to Be Lonely", "Uh! All Night" and "Tears Are Falling".

== Reception ==
Professional ratings
Review scores
| Source | Rating |
|---|---|
| AllMusic | 1.5/5 stars |
| Collector's Guide to Heavy Metal | 7/10 |
| Encyclopedia of Popular Music | 2/5 stars |
| Rolling Stone | 2/5 stars |
| The Rolling Stone Album Guide | 1/5 stars |

The album was certified Gold in November 1985 by the RIAA.

== Track listing ==
All credits adapted from the original release.

Side One
| No. | Title | Writer(s) | Lead vocals | Length |
|---|---|---|---|---|
| 1. | "King of the Mountain" | Paul Stanley, Bruce Kulick, Desmond Child | Stanley | 4:17 |
| 2. | "Any Way You Slice It" | Gene Simmons, Howard Rice | Simmons | 4:02 |
| 3. | "Who Wants to Be Lonely" | Stanley, Child, Jean Beauvoir | Stanley | 4:01 |
| 4. | "Trial by Fire" | Simmons, Kulick | Simmons | 3:25 |
| 5. | "I'm Alive" | Stanley, Kulick, Child | Stanley | 3:43 |

Side Two
| No. | Title | Writer(s) | Lead vocals | Length |
|---|---|---|---|---|
| 6. | "Love's a Deadly Weapon" | Stanley, Simmons, Rod Swenson, Wes Beech | Simmons | 3:29 |
| 7. | "Tears Are Falling" | Stanley | Stanley | 3:55 |
| 8. | "Secretly Cruel" | Simmons | Simmons | 3:41 |
| 9. | "Radar for Love" | Stanley, Child | Stanley | 4:02 |
| 10. | "Uh! All Night" | Stanley, Child, Beauvoir | Stanley | 4:01 |

== Personnel ==
Kiss

- Paul Stanley – vocals, rhythm guitar, bass on "Tears Are Falling"
- Gene Simmons – bass, vocals
- Eric Carr – drums, percussion, backing vocals
- Bruce Kulick – lead guitar, backing vocals

Additional musicians

- Jean Beauvoir – bass and backing vocals on "Who Wants to Be Lonely" and "Uh! All Night"
- Allan Schwartzberg – drum overdubs on "Who Wants to Be Lonely", "Tears Are Falling", "Uh! All Night"

Production

- Dave Wittman – engineer, mixing
- Ed Garcia, Ken Steiger – assistant engineers
- George Marino – mastering at Sterling Sound, New York

== Charts ==
| Chart (1985) | Peak position |
|---|---|
| Australian Albums (Kent Music Report) | 89 |
| Canada Top Albums/CDs (RPM) | 54 |
| Dutch Albums (Album Top 100) | 34 |
| Finnish Albums (The Official Finnish Charts) | 1 |
| German Albums (Offizielle Top 100) | 43 |
| Japanese Albums (Oricon) | 18 |
| Norwegian Albums (VG-lista) | 11 |
| Swedish Albums (Sverigetopplistan) | 3 |
| Swiss Albums (Schweizer Hitparade) | 15 |
| UK Albums (Official Charts) | 12 |
| US Billboard 200 | 20 |

== Certifications ==
| Region | Certification | Certified units/sales |
|---|---|---|
| Canada (Music Canada) | Gold | 50,000^{^} |
| United States (RIAA) | Gold | 500,000^{^} |
^{^} Shipments figures based on certification alone.
