= Tears Are Falling =

Single by Kiss

from the album Asylum
- Released: September 9, 1985
- Recorded: 1985
- Studio: Electric Lady, New York City
- Genre: Glam metal
- Length: 3:55
- Label: Mercury
- Songwriter: Paul Stanley
- Producers: Paul Stanley, Gene Simmons

Kiss singles chronology
| "Thrills in the Night" / "Burn Bitch Burn" (1984) | "Tears Are Falling" / "Any Way You Slice It" (1985) | "Crazy Crazy Nights" / "No, No, No" (1987) |

Music video
- "Tears Are Falling" on YouTube

"Tears Are Falling" is a song by American rock band Kiss. It was released as the lead single from the band's 1985 studio album Asylum.

== Background ==
The track was written and sung by vocalist/guitarist Paul Stanley. It is one of Kiss' few songs since the 1970s to have been solely created by him. It would also be Stanley's last individual composition until "Loving You Without You Now" on his 2006 solo album Live to Win.

== Reception ==
Cash Box said it has "a distinctive chorus hook and a pop arrangement."

== Music video ==
A video to promote the single was filmed in London in September 1985, and was directed by David Mallet. It was one of three videos produced in promotion of the 'Asylum' album, along with 'Uh! All Night' and 'Who Wants to Be Lonely'. Despite the low production values of the 'Tears Are Falling' video, it was heavily played on MTV's Dial MTV phone video-request show for several months, until a new ruling stated that the requested videos had to be only a few weeks old to qualify.

== Chart performance ==
The song enjoyed minor success when it was released as a single in the United States and United Kingdom. It peaked at number 20 on Billboard's Hot Mainstream Rock Tracks and 51 on the Billboard Hot 100, meanwhile peaking at 57 in the UK Singles Chart.

== Personnel ==
- Paul Stanley - lead and backing vocals, rhythm guitar, bass guitar
- Gene Simmons - backing vocals
- Bruce Kulick - lead guitar, backing vocals
- Eric Carr - drums, backing vocals
- Allan Schwartzberg - additional stereo drum overdubs

== Charts ==
| Chart (1985–1986) | Peak position |
|---|---|
| Canada Top Singles (RPM) | 83 |
| UK Singles (Official Charts) | 57 |
| US Billboard Hot 100 | 51 |
| US Mainstream Rock (Billboard) | 20 |
