= All Hell's Breakin' Loose =

Single by Kiss

from the album Lick It Up
- Released: February 6, 1984
- Recorded: 1983
- Studio: Right Track Studios, New York City
- Genre: Glam metal; rap rock
- Length: 3:49
- Label: Mercury
- Songwriters: Eric Carr, Paul Stanley, Gene Simmons, Vinnie Vincent
- Producers: Michael James Jackson, Paul Stanley and Gene Simmons

Kiss singles chronology
"Lick It Up" / "Dance All Over Your Face" (1983)	"All Hell's Breakin' Loose" / "Young and Wasted" (1984)	"Heaven's on Fire" / "Lonely is the Hunter" (1984)

Music video
- "All Hell's Breakin' Loose" on YouTube

"All Hell's Breakin' Loose" is a song by American rock band Kiss, released in 1984 as the second and final single from their 11th studio album Lick It Up. While not as successful as the album's previous single, "Lick It Up" and not charting in the US, the song reached number 71 in West Germany and appears on The Box Set, released in 2001. During their tenure in Continental Championship Wrestling, the Stud Stable used the song as their entrance theme.

== Composition ==
"All Hell's Breakin' Loose" (1983)
A 30-second sample of the opening riff from "All Hell's Breakin' Loose"

"All Hell's Breakin' Loose" is one of four songs in the history of the band in which all four (current at the time) members share songwriting credit, the others being "Love Theme from Kiss" (from the self-titled album), "Finale" (from Music from "The Elder"), and "Back to the Stone Age" (from Monster). Despite this, Eric Carr was the primary writer of the song, coming up with the music and arrangement.

Carr originally wanted the song to reflect his Led Zeppelin influence, and was initially upset that Stanley used a rap for the verse (an early example of rap-rock fusion). Carr later stated that he felt that Stanley's contributions to the song helped it to be included on the album and in becoming a single.

== Release ==
The single was backed by Lick It Up album track "Gimme More" in some countries, and "Young and Wasted" in others. Upon release, the song didn't get as much airplay or chart success as the previously released title track, but still helped Kiss make a comeback after a pair of unsuccessful albums.

== Critical reception ==
Martin Popoff, writing for Goldmine, described the song and "Lick It Up" as "squarely early hair metal anthems" Sleaze Roxx writer Lance Lumley praised the song's apocalyptic music video for fitting the lyrics well, but states "Although many like the song, I’m not a fan of Paul's rapping the lyrics."

Eric Carr himself wasn't a fan of "All Hell's Breakin' Loose" because of the spoken word verses. "I'm going, 'Oh my God, what are you doing to my song!?" he recalled. Stanley continues "Eric hated it," adding that "it was just so clearly off from what he heard."

== Music video ==
A video for the single was directed by Martin Kahan and produced by Lenney Grodin, featuring the band wandering around a burnt-out cityscape amongst thugs, bikers, scantily clad women, circus performers, and other odd characters. The video received some air play on MTV, and was nominated for a MTV video music award in 1984.

== Personnel ==
- Paul Stanley – lead vocals, rhythm guitar
- Gene Simmons – bass guitar, backing vocals
- Eric Carr – drums, backing vocals
- Vinnie Vincent – lead guitar, backing vocals

== Charts ==
Chart (1984)	Peak position
West Germany (GfK)	71
