= Animalize =

Studio album by Kiss
- Released: September 13, 1984
- Studio: Right Track Recording (New York City)
- Genres: Glam metal; hard rock; heavy metal
- Length: 35:42
- Label: Mercury
- Producer: Paul Stanley

Kiss chronology
Lick It Up (1983)	Animalize (1984)	Asylum (1985)

Singles from Animalize
- 1. "Heaven's on Fire" Released: September 19, 1984; 2. "Thrills in the Night" Released: January 13, 1985

Animalize is the twelfth studio album by American rock band Kiss. It was released on September 13, 1984, by Mercury Records. The album marked the only appearance by lead guitarist Mark St. John, who replaced Vinnie Vincent in April 1984.

== Background ==
At this point in Kiss's career, the band had lost two founding members, drummer Peter Criss and lead guitarist Ace Frehley, released two unsuccessful albums that largely alienated their fanbase (1980's Unmasked and 1981's Music from "The Elder") and made a "return to form" with 1982's Creatures of the Night that still failed to gain the public's attention. However, the sessions for Animalize saw the band regaining momentum, as 1983's Lick It Up had achieved Platinum status and yielded a successful tour. With the departure of another member in lead guitarist Vinnie Vincent and the hiring of a complete unknown in Mark St. John to replace him, Animalize saw the band at a crossroads of sorts.

At the time of the album's recording, vocalist/bassist Gene Simmons was pursuing a career in acting and was largely absent from Kiss. Vocalist/guitarist Paul Stanley later said, "I felt abandoned when it came time to make Animalize. After informing me without any warning or discussion that he wouldn't be around for the album, Gene went into a studio and crapped out some demos as fast as he could. Then he was off to do a movie." Stanley had become Kiss's de facto leader and he was left responsible for songwriting, production and direction of the new album.

Simmons' relationships with his bandmates were at an all time low during this period. Most of this centered around his perceived lack of commitment to the band and his preoccupation with numerous outside projects, including producing and managing other rock groups such as Black 'n Blue (of whom future Kiss bandmate Tommy Thayer was a member at the time), and co-starring in the 1984 movie Runaway.

== Recording ==
Entering the studio to record Animalize, newly hired lead guitarist St. John clashed often with his new bandmates, with Carr saying years later that St. John's talent led to a very arrogant demeanor in the studio. A disagreement over a bass part which bassist Simmons had asked St. John to record for the album left both Simmons and Carr furious with the new guitarist, with Stanley and Simmons later taking St. John aside to warn him about his bad attitude. According to St. John himself, Stanley and Simmons got "all kind of weird" over what he was recording in the studio, with Stanley saying that his playing had no structure and that the guitarist was "just puking notes" and could never play the same thing twice. Bruce Kulick, future Kiss member and brother of former Kiss-collaborator Bob Kulick, was eventually brought into the studio to play a guitar solo on the track "Lonely Is the Hunter" & opening guitar intro for "Murder in High-Heels".

Along with songwriter Desmond Child, Stanley gave the band its biggest hit single in years with "Heaven's on Fire". On top of production, Stanley claims to have personally handled everything from naming the album to marketing and "cajoling MTV".

== Reception ==
Professional ratings
Review scores
Source	Rating
AllMusic	2/5 stars
Collector's Guide to Heavy Metal	8/10
Encyclopedia of Popular Music	2/5 stars
The Rolling Stone Album Guide	1/5 stars

In retrospective reviews, Matthew Wilkening of Ultimate Classic Rock described Animalize as "Kiss' most aggressive album ever" with some tracks "bordering on metal territory with their heavily distorted, uptempo attack." Greg Prato of AllMusic observed that "Kiss seemed to be copying other successful pop-metal bands (Bon Jovi, Def Leppard, Mötley Crüe, etc.), both musically and visually" and concluded that the album, despite having a few good songs, wasn't as strong as its two predecessors, singling out most of Simmons' contributions as "forgettable" and "embarrassing".

Guitar World magazine later placed the album on their list of "New Sensations: 50 Iconic Albums That Defined 1984".

=== Sales ===
In a continuation of Kiss' commercial resurgence which had begun with 1983's Lick It Up, Animalize was certified Platinum by the RIAA on December 12, 1984. It was the biggest-selling Kiss album since 1979's Dynasty.

"Heaven's on Fire" became the biggest hit from the album (as well as one of the only songs to survive on the band's live setlist after the '80s), and its music video received heavy MTV rotation. It is also the only music video appearance of Mark St. John.

== Tour ==
St. John was forced to temporarily leave Kiss before the subsequent tour after being diagnosed with reactive arthritis. The group again turned to Bruce Kulick as a temporary replacement for St. John for the first two months of the tour in Europe. St. John himself later confessed that his health was not the reason he left the band. "The arthritis thing was really a cover up for the other reasons, you know what I'm trying to say?", he said later. He referred to his inability to get along with his new Kiss bandmates as "a meeting of East meets West type of thing".

Eventually, St. John played two full shows and one partial show with the band during the American leg of the tour in late November 1984. One of the full shows was released officially in 2023 on the live album "Off The Soundboard: Live in Poughkeepsie, NY 1984". However, it quickly became apparent that Kulick gelled with the band's personalities and playing styles better than St. John; by December 1984, St. John had been officially fired and replaced on a permanent basis by Kulick, making him the third lead guitarist to exit the group in only two years.

== Track listing ==
All credits adapted from the original release.

Side one
No.	Title	Writer(s)	Lead vocals	Length
1.	"I've Had Enough (Into the Fire)"	Paul Stanley, Desmond Child	Stanley	3:52
2.	"Heaven's on Fire"	Stanley, Child	Stanley	3:21
3.	"Burn Bitch Burn"	Gene Simmons	Simmons	4:42
4.	"Get All You Can Take"	Stanley, Mitch Weissman	Stanley	3:44
5.	"Lonely Is the Hunter"	Simmons	Simmons	4:28

Side two
No.	Title	Writer(s)	Lead vocals	Length
6.	"Under the Gun"	Stanley, Eric Carr, Child	Stanley	4:01
7.	"Thrills in the Night"	Stanley, Jean Beauvoir	Stanley	4:21
8.	"While the City Sleeps"	Simmons, Weissman	Simmons	3:41
9.	"Murder in High-Heels"	Simmons, Weissman	Simmons	3:52
Total length:				35:42

== Personnel ==
Kiss

- Paul Stanley – vocals, rhythm guitar; bass on "I've Had Enough (Into the Fire)", producer, back cover photo concept
- Gene Simmons – vocals, bass on tracks 2, 3, 5, & 8, associate producer
- Eric Carr – drums, percussion, backing vocals
- Mark St. John – lead guitar, backing vocals

Additional musicians

- Bruce Kulick – guitar solo on "Lonely Is the Hunter" and additional guitar on "Murder in High-Heels"
- Jean Beauvoir – bass on "Get All You Can Take", "Under the Gun" and "Thrills in the Night"
- Desmond Child − backing vocals
- Allan Schwartzberg – drum overdubs on "I've Had Enough", "Heaven's on Fire", "Thrills in the Night".
- Mitch Weissman − additional guitar on "Get All You Can Take" and "While the City Sleeps"; bass on "Murder in High-Heels"

Production

- Chris Minto – engineer
- Timothy Crich – assistant engineer
- Dave Wittman – additional recording, mixing
- Michael James Jackson – drum recording producer
- George Marino – mastering at Sterling Sound, New York
- Bernard Vidal – back cover photography
- Howard Marks Advertising – design

== Charts ==
Chart (1984–85)	Peak position
Australian Albums (Kent Music Report)	40
Austrian Albums (Ö3 Austria)	14
Canada Top Albums/CDs (RPM)	41
Dutch Albums (Album Top 100)	17
Finnish Albums (The Official Finnish Charts)	4
German Albums (Offizielle Top 100)	25
Icelandic Albums Chart	7
Italian Albums (Musica e Dischi)	25
Japanese Albums (Oricon)	23
Norwegian Albums (VG-lista)	7
Swedish Albums (Sverigetopplistan)	8
Swiss Albums (Schweizer Hitparade)	9
UK Albums (Official Charts)	11
US Billboard 200	19

== Certifications ==
Region	Certification	Certified units/sales
Canada (Music Canada)	Platinum	100,000^{^}
Finland (Musiikkituottajat)	Gold	25,000
United States (RIAA)	Platinum	1,000,000^{^}
^{^} Shipments figures based on certification alone.

== See also ==
- Animalize Live Uncensored
