= Mark St. John =

American guitarist (1956–2007)

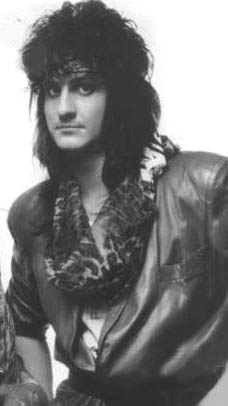
- St. John in 1984

Background information
- Born: Mark Leslie Norton; February 7, 1956
- Origin: Hollywood, California, U.S.
- Died: April 5, 2007 (aged 51)
- Genres: Hard rock; glam metal
- Occupation: Guitarist
- Years active: 1984–2003
- Formerly of: Kiss; White Tiger; The Keep

Mark Leslie Norton (February 7, 1956 – April 5, 2007), better known as Mark St. John, was an American guitarist best known for his brief stint with the hard rock band Kiss from April to November 1984. His work can be heard on the band's 1984 album Animalize and their 2023 live album Off the Soundboard: Poughkeepsie, NY. After leaving Kiss, he co-founded the band White Tiger.

St. John died suddenly in early April 2007, several months after being badly beaten during a brief stay in an Orange County jail.

== Career ==
=== Pre-Kiss ===
Prior to joining Kiss in 1984, St. John worked as a teacher and played guitar in a Southern California cover band called Front Page.

=== Kiss ===
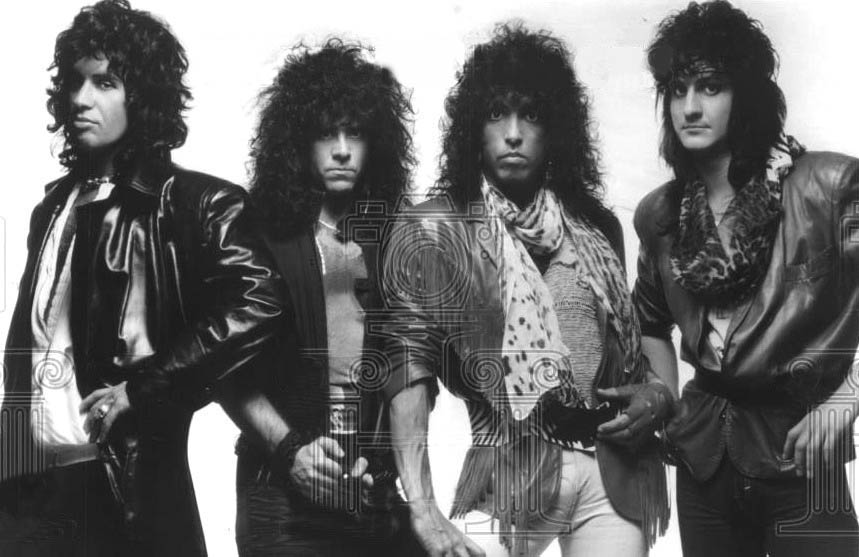
St. John (far right) as part of Kiss in 1984

Guitar maker Grover Jackson helped St. John get in touch with Paul Stanley in early 1984. He was selected as Kiss' new lead guitarist after an audition, and he subsequently signed a five-year contract with the band, replacing Vinnie Vincent. St. John would ultimately be with Kiss for only seven months, with his work being featured on the 1984 album Animalize, the second album of Kiss' post-makeup era. St. John's only video appearance with Kiss was in the video for the hit single "Heaven's on Fire".

During the mid-1984 recording sessions for Animalize, St. John clashed with his new bandmates frequently. Drummer Eric Carr said later that "as soon as he joined the band we knew that there was a problem", even before he had played his first live show with Kiss. The guitarist was "over-qualified" according to Carr, and his talent caused him to behave arrogantly in the studio. Gene Simmons had asked St. John to record a bass part and Carr later remarked to him that he thought one of the notes sounded wrong. St. John's furious reaction left Simmons extremely unimpressed, and Carr "wanted to kill Mark" following the incident. Simmons and Stanley took St. John aside following the outburst and made it clear that such behavior would not be tolerated. Stanley said that, additionally, they had tremendous difficulty writing and recording guitar solos for Animalize, with St. John often being unable to play the same thing twice if a second take was required.

Kiss issued a press release stating that St. John had developed severe reactive arthritis and was unable to play guitar. Bruce Kulick would serve as his temporary replacement for the opening European leg of the Animalize World Tour. St. John rejoined Kiss shortly after the band returned to America. It was at this point that he was instructed to watch the shows and learn the dynamics of the Animalize live show, in order for Stanley and Simmons to be able to smoothly insert him into the show.

St. John made his live debut with Kiss on November 27, 1984, in Baltimore, Maryland. Kulick played the first five songs of the show, with St. John later taking the stage to play five songs, with Kulick then returning to finish the show. St. John and Kulick appeared together at the end of the show, bowing with the rest of the band members. The following day, St. John played his first full show with the band on November 28, 1984, in Poughkeepsie, New York. This show was later released as a KISS: Off the Soundboard live album in April 2023. Finally, on November 29, 1984, St. John played his final full concert with Kiss, in Binghamton, New York. Following these shows, it quickly became apparent that Kulick was a more natural fit for Kiss than was St. John. As a result, he was let go on December 7, 1984, after a Kiss concert in Fort Wayne, Indiana. Kulick was announced as Kiss' new permanent lead guitarist the next day.

St. John later confessed that his medical condition had been a cover story, saying "The arthritis thing was really a cover up for the other reasons, you know what I'm trying to say?"

St. John is the only member of Kiss not to appear on any album front cover, as the Animalize cover features only a tapestry of animal prints. However, he is posing with the rest of the band on the album's back cover.

=== After Kiss ===
In January 1985 St. John teamed up with vocalist David Donato and drummer Barry Brandt of Angel to work on developing some demo ideas. By March he was playing live again, appearing at an all-star jam session at the FM Station Club. The lineup included Rudy Sarzo and Tommy Aldridge (Kiss Revolution, April/May 1985). St. John also performed at a sold-out audience at a benefit jazz concert for Greenpeace. Some of the musicians playing alongside St. John included the Steve Hooks Band, Stu Nevitt (Shadowfax), Slyde Hyde (Tom Scott/Supertramp), Al Aarons (Count Basie), plus other special all-star guests.

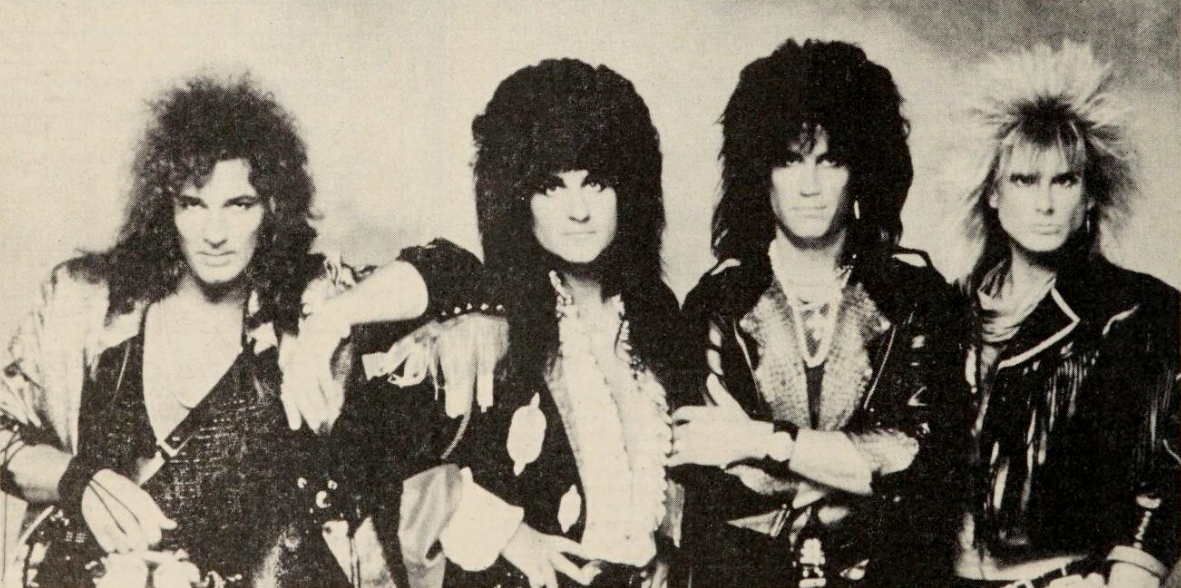
Mark St. John (middle left) as part of White Tiger in the 1980s

St. John and Donato soon formed White Tiger. They had written most of the material for the album by mid-1985 and set out to complete a lineup with which to record. The band also included St. John's younger brother, Michael, on bass, and was completed with the addition of Brian James Fox on drums. While the independent release did well on that level selling some 50,000 copies, and the band gigged around California, White Tiger joined up with Garry Lane owner of Logic Productions who promoted many top bands in LA. St. John and Lane became good friends meeting for a second time at Trojan Studios in Garden Grove, California. That is where St. John and Lane came up with the idea to play the legendary club known as The Hot Spot located in Huntington Beach, California, owned by Gennie Gromet (who was the ex-wife of Dick Dale from the band Dick Dale and the Del-Tones). The band did not manage to break and split while working on demos for a second album in 1988. St. John teamed up with Jeff Scott Soto in 1988 to make a demo. St. John also did some session work performing lead guitar on "Livin' for My Lord" on Ken Tamplin's 1990 album, Axe to Grind. Tamplin is an inspirational Christian rocker more famed for his involvement in the band Shout. Tamplin has also co-written material with Gene Simmons of Kiss. St. John also worked with former Knight Rider star David Hasselhoff, even appearing in his video, "Is Everyone Happy".

St. John made a demo in 1990 with fellow former Kiss member Peter Criss. This band, known as the Keep, became what was essentially White Tiger, with Criss replacing Brian Fox on drums, and David Donato replacing original vocalist David MacDonald. This lineup performed live just once, on May 2, 1990, at a drum clinic at the Guitar Center music store in Lawndale, California.

When the band started shopping their demo (credited as Peter Criss) around the response was universally negative. One cassette demo to circulate simply featured "Love for Sale", "Long Time", and "All Night Long", though they had also covered Lee Michaels' 1971 hit "Do You Know What I Mean", and had other original material such as "Between the Lines". By early 1991, the difficulty shopping the demo, and St. John's need to get on with making a living, led to friction between Criss and him, and he left the band (which eventually became Criss).

He was in a short-lived band with Phil Naro called the Mark St. John Project that released a limited edition EP in 1999, and he also made frequent appearances at Kiss expos during this time. He later released an all-instrumental CD in 2003 called Magic Bullet Theory, which would be his final recorded material released in his lifetime.

In later years, St. John did not make many public appearances. In 2023 Kiss announced they would release the only known full live show recording featuring St. John as part of their Off the Soundboard series of live albums. The show was recorded on November 28, 1984, at Mid-Hudson Civic Center in Poughkeepsie, New York.

== Declining health and death ==
Beginning on September 14, 2006, St. John was incarcerated for several days at Theo Lacy Jail in Orange County, California, after being charged with possession of unspecified drug paraphernalia, attempted destruction of evidence, and resisting arrest. He was initially housed at the facility's D Barracks, a medium-security dormitory for nonviolent offenders. He was later moved to F-West Barracks after telling guards he had stolen crackers from another inmate's property box and was in fear for his safety. A guard allegedly conspired with a group of inmates to have St. John assaulted for the transgression, and subsequently St. John was brutally beaten and stabbed with pencils by a group of up to 20 inmates. The guard was later placed on paid leave pending an investigation into this and other violent incidents inside the jail. In an interview with the OC Weekly, a fellow inmate described St. John's encounter:

He got caught stealing something. I guess he did that somewhere else in the jail, but we found out about it somehow. . . . The Kiss guy got beat up pretty bad.

His girlfriend, who said he was unrecognizable after the vicious beating, believed the incident was directly responsible for his untimely death several months later. A couple of days before the beating, St. John told her that he had "snitched" on a drug dealer several years earlier, and he believed he was certain to be attacked if this became known by the other inmates.

For the next several months after leaving Theo Lacy Jail, St. John suffered severe headaches and body aches and many times told his girlfriend that the chronic ailments were absolutely the result of the beating at Theo Lacy. While it is not known what medical attention he received inside the jail, after his release he refused to see a doctor due to having no medical insurance, and thus his health deteriorated. St. John died on April 5, 2007, due to what the coroner described as a brain hemorrhage brought on by an accidental overdose of methamphetamine.

Friends claimed that St. John was never the same after the beating and would not discuss his brief time at Theo Lacy Jail. Another friend stated that St. John fell deep into depression and drug addiction after being released, selling all his stage outfits, and mowing lawns and doing roofing to afford a drug habit that spiraled out of control.

== Discography ==
Kiss

- Animalize (1984)
- Off the Soundboard: Live In Poughkeepsie, NY 1984 (2023)

White Tiger

- White Tiger (1986)

Mark St. John Project

- Mark St. John Project (EP, 1999)

Mark St. John

- Magic Bullet Theory (2003)

Preceded by Vinnie Vincent	Lead guitarist of Kiss; 1984	Succeeded by Bruce Kulick
