= Heaven's on Fire =

Single by Kiss

from the album Animalize
- B-side: "Lonely Is the Hunter"
- Released: September 15, 1984 (U.S.)
- Recorded: Right Track Studios, New York City: 1984
- Genre: Glam metal; hard rock
- Length: 3:18
- Label: Mercury 880 205-7 (US)
- Songwriters: Paul Stanley, Desmond Child
- Producer: Paul Stanley

Kiss singles chronology
"All Hell's Breakin' Loose" / "Young and Wasted" (1984)	"Heaven's on Fire" (1984)	"Thrills in the Night" / "Burn Bitch Burn" (1985)

Music video
- "Heaven's on Fire" on YouTube

"Heaven's on Fire" is a song by the American hard rock band Kiss. Written by frontman Paul Stanley and songwriter Desmond Child, it was released as the lead single from their 12th studio album, Animalize (1984).

== Composition ==
"Heaven's on Fire" is a glam metal and hard rock song, blending heavy riffs with melodic hooks. The opening "Woo-oo-oo" was a vocal warm-up by Stanley that was accidentally recorded but was later added to the song.

== Release ==
Released as a single internationally in 1984, "Heaven's on Fire" charted in several countries, even though it failed to reach the top ten in any of the countries where it was released as a single. It did reach #11 on Billboard's Hot Mainstream Rock Tracks and #49 on the Billboard Hot 100. In addition, the song is one of only a select few from the bands' non-makeup era that has been performed live after the band returned to wearing makeup.

A live version of the song was recorded at Cobo Hall on December 8, 1984, as part of the Kiss: Animalize Live Uncensored video, and was later released on the Hear 'n Aid album.

== Music video ==
A video for the single was filmed and played on MTV, and was directed by David Lewis and produced by John Weaver. It marked the only official promotional performance of the band with lead guitarist Mark St. John before he left the group due to problems in his hands caused by a painful, but temporary, form of arthritis called Reactive arthritis. St. John would be replaced shortly afterwards by Bruce Kulick.

== Personnel ==
Kiss

- Paul Stanley – lead vocals, rhythm guitar
- Gene Simmons – bass guitar, backing vocals
- Eric Carr – drums, backing vocals
- Mark St. John – lead guitar

Additional musician

- Desmond Child – backing vocals

== Charts ==
Chart (1984–1985)	Peak position
Australian Singles (Kent Music Report)	62
Canada Top Singles (RPM)	46
Netherlands (Single Top 100)	34
Sweden (Sverigetopplistan)	19
UK Singles (Official Charts)	43
US Billboard Hot 100	49
US Mainstream Rock (Billboard)	11
