= Eric Carr =

American drummer (1950–1991)

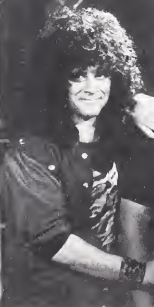
- Eric Carr c. 1983

Background information
- Also known as: The Fox
- Born: Paul Charles Caravello; July 12, 1950; New York City, U.S.
- Died: November 24, 1991 (aged 41) New York City, U.S.
- Cause of death: Heart cancer
- Genres: Hard rock; heavy metal; glam metal
- Occupation: Drummer
- Years active: 1965–1991
- Formerly of: Kiss
- Website: ericcarr.com

Paul Charles Caravello (July 12, 1950 – November 24, 1991), better known as Eric Carr, was an American musician. He was the drummer for the rock band Kiss from 1980 until his death in 1991. Caravello was selected as the new Kiss drummer after Peter Criss departed. He created the stage name "Eric Carr" and designed his on-stage Fox persona. He remained a member of Kiss until his death from heart cancer in 1991.

== Early life ==
Born as Paul Charles Caravello on July 12, 1950, to Albert (1927–2022) and Connie Caravello (1929–2010), Carr was of Italian descent. He grew up on 1043 Belmont Avenue in the East New York section of Brooklyn in New York City. Because his father worked most of the time, Carr did not see that much of him, and "never went to a baseball game or that kind of stuff" with his father. He spent a lot of time alone in his room, playing with toy soldiers and toy monsters.

Caravello attended the High School of Art and Design. He planned at first to be a cartoonist, then changed his mind quickly thereafter and decided to study photography. According to him, he ended up wasting "absolutely every day of high school. I got no work done, did nothing to further my career, wasted time, and wound up getting drunk in the darkroom with my friends all the time. We never got caught because we could see through the one-way glass whenever a teacher would come. It wasn't like I was getting drunk every day, you know. Half a cup of vodka in those days was enough to get you drunk." However, he has described himself as overall "a real good kid. I didn't do anything to make trouble."

In February 1964, Caravello watched the Beatles performance on The Ed Sullivan Show and was immediately captivated by the group, particularly Ringo Starr. He collected several books and pots from the kitchen to create a makeshift drum kit and began teaching himself how to play drums.

Caravello was one of only two students in his high school who had long hair, mostly due to his love of the Beatles. He recalled that "I used to Dippity-Do my hair down, to make it stay flat. I used to have a Beatles haircut, but my hair's curly, so I couldn't get it to lay flat like the Beatles'. So I'd get the stuff Dippity-Do, drench my hair with it, and I'd take a piece of my Mom's nylon stocking, tie a knot in one end, and pull it over my head like a burglar. I was sleeping like that for probably two years with that on my head every night."

Caravello graduated from high school in 1967. At around that time, riots started to occur in New York City, followed by white flight that started to make his neighborhood more predominantly African-American. Caravello stated that this was not a concern to him, because "I never had any problems with anybody, I had black friends, and I never grew up thinking in those kinds of terms.".

== Early career ==
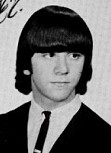
Eric Carr photo from the A&D, yearbook of High School of Art and Design, New York, 1967

Caravello purchased a small drum kit that consisted of snare, kick, and a tom. The kit had a black oyster finish that was similar to Ringo's kit. Within a few months he added a floor tom. Sometime in 1965 he joined his first band, the Allures. They played a blend of Latino music and Beatles songs. the Allures did not last long, perhaps only a few months.

Caravello then asked his friend in junior high school, Thomas, to join him on bass while they looked for other musicians. Shortly after starting high school he met John, who was interested in learning to play the guitar. The three young musicians called the group the Cellarmen because they practiced in Caravello's cellar. Thomas and Caravello soon began working as a team and eventually wrote two Beatles-inspired songs, "Your Turn to Cry" and "I Cry at Night." The drummer felt confident in the band and soon designed stylized lettering of the band's name and printed the Cellarmen on the front of his kick drum. However, the band broke up in late 1965 or early 1966.

In March 1966, Caravello met keyboardist Victor Cohen and bassist Dave Bartky. Guitarist Bob Pryor joined the band within a few weeks. They played cover songs and their goal was to become good enough to play in the clubs. They practiced several times a week and soon had considerable number of songs ready. They kept the Cellarmen name because at the time they did not have enough money to purchase a new kick drum skin. Besides, the band still practiced in Caravello's cellar, so the name was appropriate. The Cellarmen's first gig was in August 1966. They were strictly a cover band playing popular music of the times.

The Cellarmen played together until late 1968. In that time they had progressed musically and financially, and were represented by Ruston & Brenner, a large booking agency in New York City. They also recorded the two songs Caravello had written with the previous iteration of the Cellarmen. The two songs appear on the Jody Records label.

During the last few months with the Cellarmen, Caravello added a second kick drum to his kit. He began exploring heavier music, such as Cream and Jimi Hendrix. After the Cellarmen disbanded. Caravello formed a new band called Things that Go Bump in the Night. This band played heavy music, but failed to gain traction in the clubs and soon disbanded.

In the spring of 1969, Caravello joined his three former bandmates from the Cellarmen and vocalist Gary Fray in their band, Smack. Caravello insisted he would work with this cover band only until the fall. Ruston & Brenner continued booking Smack through the summer and band was soon in demand in the clubs.

In the fall of 1969, Caravello left Smack, but he did not have another band to join. In November 1970 he joined a band called Salt & Pepper, a cover band playing music from multiple genres; the band was named that because half of the members were black and half were white. His old bandmate, Victor Cohen, was the keyboardist and recommended Caravello to the band. Salt & Pepper played mostly Top 40 songs. As he described it later, "Top-40 in those days was everything – funk, ballads, rock, country, and everything. It was a great time for radio.". Salt & Pepper had marginal success playing other events, such as opening for Nina Simone in December 1971 at the Academy of Music (New York City).

In 1973 the band changed their name to Creation, now performing disco music as well as Top 40, Motown, and funk. In March 1973, Salt & Pepper opened for Stevie Wonder at a benefit concert. By this time Caravello was playing an acrylic [Fibes Drums] kit.

In 1974 a fire broke out during a discothèque gig at Gulliver's nightclub in Port Chester, New York, killing dozens of people including the band's keyboardist, Damon DeFreis, and lead singer George D. Chase. Caravello escaped and was credited with also saving John and Sarita Henderson, the other two members of Creation. It was determined that the fire had been started by a thief in an adjacent building hoping to cover his tracks.

Ruston & Brenner held a benefit to replace their ruined equipment. and Creation was back playing the clubs by the end of the year.

In 1975, Creation changed its name to Mother Nature-Father Time. They continued playing the mostly disco songs in the clubs.

In early 1978 Gregg Diamond, who had recently released an album titled Bionic Boogie, hired Mother Nature-Father Time to play as the touring band, however Gregg did not go on tour as he was strictly a studio musician. Over the next year, Mother Nature-Father Time played gigs under that name and as Bionic Boogie. They enjoyed some success, such as playing in Walt Disney World in Florida, and playing on disco TV shows in Florida and Canada.

In the spring of 1979, producer Lewis Merenstein, who knew Casablanca Records founder Neil Bogart, received an offer to produce a disco record. He soon recruited Mother Nature-Father Time with guitarist Tom Siano writing three of the five songs. Caravello sang background vocals and played drums on the record. The album was titled Lightning and Casablanca released the band's self-titled album on August 13, 1979.

The Lightning album and Diamond's latest album Tiger, Tiger both failed to chart. The result was the end of the Caravello's work with people he had known since 1970. Diamond did not hire Mother Nature-Father Time to tour and Mother Nature-Father Time broke up in October 1979. Caravello later described the band as "like my family basically for nine years."

In December 1979, Caravello successfully auditioned for a four-piece rock 'n' roll cover band called Flasher. After three weeks of rehearsals, they started playing at clubs. Flasher played the club circuit in New York City and Long Island for several months before Paul Turino, their keyboard player, quit to join a band that was signed to a record label and touring. Flasher continued as a power trio, with the three sharing vocal duties. They played songs by Joe Jackson, Van Halen, Led Zeppelin and Jimi Hendrix, among others.

Eventually, bookings diminished and Caravello become discouraged about his musical future after so many years trying to make it without a break and considered settling down with a non-musical career. "We were making real (lousy) money – something like $10, $7 a night, whatever it was it was. Really, really terrible. Just by contrast, I used to make $15 a night when I was like 16 years old, and here I am almost 30 years old, and I'm making like $7 a night! So I wasn't doing better, obviously – I was going in reverse." Caravello handed in his resignation in late May 1980 but agreed to play the remaining shows the band were booked for. At that point, he considered quitting music, having reached the age of 30 without any real success. In early June, Caravello had a chance meeting with Turino in a club in Queens called Poets. Caravello invited Turino to see Flasher play the following night at the same club. The next night, Turino told Caravello about Peter Criss's departure from Kiss, and urged Caravello to audition to become Kiss' drummer.

== Kiss ==
=== Audition ===
Caravello applied for Kiss, submitting a cassette tape of Kiss' current single "Shandi" but with his vocals over the music instead of Paul Stanley's vocals. "It sounded great!" he enthused years later. The application was put into a bright orange folder to make it stand out visually. Jayne Grodd, a Kiss staffer, told him later she had noticed the brightly colored envelope and so picked it to be one reviewed from the pile.

While sitting outside the room used for the audition, Caravello watched the three members of Kiss – Ace Frehley, Gene Simmons and Stanley – walk by to enter the room. He was one of the few people outside of the band's circle of friends, family and music business partners, to see Kiss without make-up. "Paul, I knew right away", he told a fanzine in 1990. "The others I wasn't sure about."

Caravello was the last drummer to audition for the band and asked Stanley, Simmons and Frehley to autograph the list of Kiss songs he was to play with the band, in case he never saw them again. "But I knew I had it", he told a fanzine in 1990. According to Caravello, his audition was videotaped. He was also immediately comfortable, feeling the songs he had to play "...were a snap." He knew the arrangements better than the band did, from learning the recorded versions of Kiss' albums. "They had been on tour, and changed little things around," he said. He was not impressed with Kiss' performance at the audition. "They were awful!" he emphasized, "I had to remind them, "'No, I sing this harmony, you sing that one', stuff like that. It was great! Right away we were working together. I know it impressed them."

Stanley later described Caravello's audition: "He was this guy who cleaned stoves for a living, and the first thing he said to us was 'It's a real pleasure to meet you. Let's play.' We started playing and it was like thunder, even though he was the shortest guy in the room. It just fit like a glove. The one thing that probably sealed it for us was when, after the audition, he asked us for autographs. It wasn't brown-nosing, it's just that he was a real person."

A significant advantage for Caravello may have been his relative anonymity, as it was important for the band to maintain the mystique surrounding the members. Said Paul Stanley, "It was really important to us that we got somebody who was unknown... We didn't want somebody who last week was in Rod Stewart's band or in Rainbow." Before they issued a press release announcing the induction of Caravello into Kiss, they subtracted three years from his actual age - in part to confuse those seeking information about his true identity, but also to help create an identification with Caravello: a young fan chosen from the crowd to be the new Kiss drummer!

=== Stage makeup and persona ===
The Fox

After Caravello passed the audition, time was short and the band had some trouble coming up with a character persona and a stage name for him before his debut concert. "We never actually told him he was in the band," stated Paul Stanley on USA Network's Night Flight program in 1983, "We just said: "In two weeks we're playing.'"

Paul Stanley alleged that Caravello wanted to use the stage name "Rusty Blade" until Stanley dissuaded him. Caravello decided on "Eric Carr" quite carefully. He noticed that while the four members' full stage names were each three syllables long, Criss' name was the inverse of the other three band members' name syllable pattern – 'Peter Criss' was two syllables followed by a single syllable. He decided to make his stage name sound the same rhythmically as Peter Criss' by choosing a double syllable first name and a single syllable last name so that when people said all four names together it would still fit the same to the ear. Carr was shortened from his birth name Caravello, and he chose Eric from a list of first names his girlfriend at the time had created. Paul Caravello remained his legal name.

For his Kiss persona, Carr initially tried "the Hawk"; this concept was apparently very difficult to realize in greasepaint – a suitable make-up design was never created, and the "Hawk" costume was a "bright orange yellow!" The idea was dropped after Paul Stanley mentioned that it looked like Big Bird. With the band on deadline (only two weeks before Carr's stage debut), Carr came up with the make-up design for the persona of "the Fox"; Simmons liked it and thus the character was born. The original design was modified within days of Carr's initial photo sessions and debut concert as a Kiss member.

Carr's first public performance was with the band in New York City's Palladium on July 25, 1980. His parents, warned to not tell anyone their son was in Kiss (to maintain the mystique that no one knew what the new member looked like without make-up), attended the concert, and were recognized by a friend who worked with Carr at a repair shop – and had no idea the new Kiss member behind the kit was his former coworker. " 'What are you doing here?' ", Carr's father, Albert Caravello, related in the Tale of the Fox DVD, " 'You like Kiss?' I said, "Yeah!' " The next day, Bill Aucoin, Kiss manager, told Carr that his makeup was indistinguishable from the audience and asked the drummer to refine his Fox makeup. On July 30, Carr was introduced to the public on an episode of the syndicated television youth show Kids Are People Too!, which aired in September 1980. This was the first time he wore the makeup that most fans identity him with. For Christmas in 1980, the Kiss organization bought Carr a Porsche—so their new drummer would ride around in appropriate rock-star style. The car broke down often, and caused Carr quite a bit of grief.

His persona remained consistent for three years until the band's well-publicized removal of their stage makeup in September 1983, live on MTV. The drastic move came after declining album sales and a poorly attended US tour. Carr thought the band was coming to an end, but Kiss slowly turned their career descent into a rebound, and the band thrived once again. Carr earned a reputation amongst fans for being very friendly and approachable. He answered more mail than other band members, and often added messages to his autographs. Despite replacing an original member, he gained popularity among fans based on his personality and percussion skills.

=== Tenure in Kiss ===
On August 29, 1980, Kiss began a European tour to support the Unmasked album. This was Carr's introduction to playing to large audiences, such as the 30,000 fans in Milan, Italy on September 2. The European tour ended in mid-October, after which Kiss flew to Australia for a four-week run on the Southern Continent and New Zealand, beginning on November 8 and concluding on December 2. Of the 11 shows, 10 were sold out and the highest attendance occurred in Melbourne (45,000). Carr's first tour with Kiss saw the band play 41 shows in 13 countries.

Carr's first album with Kiss was 1981's (Music from) The Elder, which marked a departure for the band toward a mystical art-rock direction. One of Carr's contributions to the album, "Under the Rose", is one of the few Kiss songs written in 6/8 time and featured a Gregorian chant-style chorus. Carr also cowrote "Escape from the Island" with Frehley and producer Bob Ezrin. It was only the second instrumental recorded by Kiss. Poor album sales and lower chart position did not allow Kiss to tour to support The Elder.

During the summer of 1982, Kiss dedicated themselves to creating a hard rock album that predominantly featured Carr's drumming and his unique style. Creatures of the Night was released on October 25, 1982. The heavy reverb on Carr's drums was a unique sound not previously heard on a Kiss album. The album featured nine songs, none of which were written by Carr. In late December 1982, Kiss began their first tour of North America since the 1979 Dynasty tour. It was Carr's first North American tour. The tour was poorly attended and ended in early April 1983 after only 53 shows. In June Kiss played in Brazil for the first time. The pent-up demand for Kiss resulted in high attendance, with approximately 137,000 people at the Rio de Janeiro show.

Carr received writing credits on "All Hell's Breakin' Loose" from Lick It Up, "Under the Gun" from Animalize, and "No, No, No" from Crazy Nights. Carr said he found writing lyrics harder than writing music.

Besides drumming, Carr also played guitar, bass guitar and piano, and also sang background vocals. Occasionally he sang lead vocals, such as on "Black Diamond" and "Young and Wasted" live with Kiss. His first lead vocal in the studio was a re-recording of "Beth" (a song originally sung by Peter Criss) for the 1988 compilation album Smashes, Thrashes & Hits. Carr recorded his version of the song in the same room in the Record Plant where the song was originally recorded, using the same backing track as Criss.

In 1989, he recorded a demo with Kiss lead guitarist Bruce Kulick. Carr wrote the music, played bass and drums, while Kulick played guitar. As Carr was not a proficient lyricist, he presented the demo to Simmons with the words to Marvin Gaye's 1965 classic "Ain't That Peculiar". Simmons wrote new lyrics, which Carr recorded for the subsequent Hot in the Shade release. The song was released as "Little Caesar". He performed the song a few times, but it wasn't performed beyond the first month of the tour. Carr's last live performance with Kiss was November 9, 1990, in New York City, at Madison Square Garden.

As a replacement member, Carr was a paid employee and did not have voting privileges, unlike the four founding members who shared profits and voting rights equally. Through Carr's years in Kiss, his rank as an employee was a source of significant discontent for him. He felt excluded and unfairly treated as a second-class Kiss citizen, for instance not being allowed to share Simmons' and Stanley's limousine, only getting minimal exposure in videos such as the Kiss eXposed VHS, or being partially cropped out of the Asylum album cover. Unlike fellow bandmember Bruce Kulick with the same status, Carr grew ever more frustrated and unhappy, culminating in his feeling of being ditched by Kiss during his 1991 hospitalization. In his autobiography, Peter Criss listed Carr as one of the people that Simmons and Stanley "drove mad": Carr "was reduced to sitting in his hotel room naked with the blinds all drawn, drinking and refusing to come out.". However, this account is questionable as Carr and Criss only met a few times during the 11 years Carr was in Kiss. The two drummers were on friendly terms but did not regularly contact each other and were not friends.

During a 1999 interview with KISS Asylum, former Kiss guitarist Mark St. John spoke fondly of Carr but mentioned he wasn't given much creative freedom during the Animalize period: "We would go out to dinner, it would be one of those type of dinner meetings, and Eric would give everybody a tape of his demos because he wanted everybody to listen. Nobody else would give tapes of their music to anybody, but he wanted it so bad, you know, he still wanted to put his music out there. Well, it was like a money thing -- if Eric got a song on the album he would make more money and people would like it more and yadda, yadda, yadda. It would be like a domino effect so they never let him do it.

Carr's last recording with Kiss was for the song "God Gave Rock 'N' Roll to You II", which featured him on backing vocals. The last time Carr worked with Kiss was in July 1991 when Kiss filmed the video for "God Gave Rock 'N Roll to You" with Carr playing drums. Carr's last public appearance with the band was at the MTV Video Music Awards in September 1991.

=== Paul Stanley memoir ===
In his 2014 memoir Face the Music: A Life Exposed, Kiss frontman Paul Stanley described Carr as a kind and talented, but troubled, soul. Carr allegedly fixated on the fact that he was neither going to be a founding member of Kiss, nor the band's first drummer. After having just met drummer Eric Singer and remaining insecure despite being in good standing with Kiss, Carr made the prescient claim that Singer was going to replace him as the new drummer in the band, which ultimately did occur in 1992 (after Carr's death). For long periods, he would not even talk to Stanley. In his book, Stanley also recalls several memorable Carr episodes, including one in which he went out with a female photographer who later took nude photos of him in a bathtub holding a glass of champagne, claiming that the photographer had promised not to publish them (the photos were soon publicized in the journal with which the photographer was associated).

== Influences and style ==
Carr was a powerful hard-hitting drummer and one of the first drummers to adopt the classic 1980s snare drum sound: a highly reverberated and low-tuned sound. In his 1980 resume sent to Kiss, Carr stated that his drumming style ranged from heavy metal and hard rock to pop and new wave claiming that "I can adapt to most situations easily." He listed drummers John Bonham, Keith Moon and Lenny White as influences.

In addition, Carr was an avid fan of the Beatles and the band's drummer Ringo Starr. In an interview he recalled, "I was caught up in the whole Beatlemania thing. I guess I was attracted to the drums because of the feeling of the rhythm and how it moved you, just sitting in your seat. I loved the way Ringo moved. I identified with him at the time". Photographs of Carr during his high school years show his hair cut and styled in the iconic Beatles haircut.

Carr's interest in double bass drumming came from his admiration of Ginger Baker and John Bonham, once telling 16 magazine, "I just loved the way John Bonham played drums". Carr also had a love of all types of music; songwriter Adam Mitchell once described Carr as knowing a lot about folk, R&B and other non-rock styles. In a 1983 interview, Carr told USA Network interviewer Al Bandero that he listened to "a lot" of Neil Young, and liked many different types of music. Simmons has stated that Carr's harder drumming style pushed Kiss into becoming a heavier band than it had been when jazz-inspired Criss was the band's drummer.

== Illness and death ==
In February 1991, Carr began feeling ill. Medical tests initially revealed what appeared to be manageable health issues. However, further tests determined that he had heart cancer. In April 1991, Carr underwent a series of surgeries to remove tumors in his right atrium and lungs in an effort to restore heart function and prevent the cancer's growth. Soon after Carr's diagnosis, Paul Stanley and Gene Simmons replaced him with session drummer Eric Singer to commence new recordings for the band's upcoming album Revenge. After recovering from the multiple surgeries, Carr pressed Stanley and Simmons to let him back in the band. Stanley and Simmons refused; both have stated they repeatedly told Carr to focus on his cancer treatments and they would allow him to return to Kiss once he regained his health. The doctors refused to let Carr leave the hospital on any conditions, no matter how he pleaded with them. Gene Simmons revealed that Eric Carr's favorite food was McDonald's, and that he and Paul Stanley would sneak out to bring back fries and other food to share with Carr.

By mid-1991, the band was preparing to shoot the music video for their upcoming single "God Gave Rock and Roll to You II". Despite his poor health, Carr asked Stanley and Simmons to allow him to be in the video. They ultimately agreed, after the doctors let the band know that Carr had only two or three months left to live. The doctors decided that Carr might as well do what he wanted and be happy in his last few weeks.

Carr flew to Los Angeles to film the video in July 1991. By that point, he had lost his hair due to chemotherapy treatments and was wearing a wig. During the filming of the video, Carr was in enormous pain, taking medications periodically throughout the filming. After the video shoot, Carr flew back to New York to continue cancer treatments; his health had deteriorated to the point where he was unable to play drums for the recording sessions for Revenge. Carr's replacement, Eric Singer, played on the album's tracks.

Carr's last public appearance with Kiss was at the MTV Video Music Awards in September 1991. Not long afterwards, he suffered an aneurysm and was rushed to the hospital. Several days later, he suffered a brain hemorrhage and never regained consciousness. He died on November 24, 1991, at the age of 41. His death occurred on the same day as Freddie Mercury, the lead singer of the British rock band Queen, whose death attracted more media attention. Carr had also been in a nearly four-year relationship with future model/actress Carrie Stevens at the time of his death. He had been planning on giving her an engagement ring for her birthday.

In keeping with Carr's accessibility to his fans, his family decided to open his funeral service to the public while reserving the interment as a private event. Carr is interred in Cedar Hill Cemetery in the town of Newburgh, New York.

Although it was not publicized at the time, Carr's death was considered controversial amongst his family and Kiss. Both Paul Stanley and Gene Simmons were labeled the "bad guys" by Carr for booting him out of the band and not supporting him in his time of need. The two were not made aware of this until they attended his funeral and were treated with hostility by Carr's family and friends. Stanley wrote in his autobiography that, at the time, he believed the allegation of mistreating Carr was simply untrue and that he did what he thought was right to support him. However, during Carr's service, Stanley admitted to "sobbing uncontrollably" and came to regret how he had treated Carr during his illness.

== Legacy and accolades ==
=== Rockology and Rockheads and Unfinished Business ===
Former Kiss guitarist Bruce Kulick, along with Carr's family, released Carr's first and only solo album in 1999, titled Rockology, which featured many demos that Kulick and Carr worked on together (along with songwriter and friend Adam Mitchell). The CD features several songs with Carr on lead vocals as well as on bass guitar, along with Kulick on guitars and Mitchell assisting Carr with many of the background vocals. This album includes "Somebody's Waiting" and "Tiara", a song that he originally wrote for his planned children's cartoon show called Rockheads, a rock band parody featuring four characters (Slider, Clive, Scruffy and Punky) with different characteristics and personalities. In 2011, Carr's family released an album of his unreleased songs called Unfinished Business. The album consists of 18 songs and runs 43 minutes in length, and includes Carr singing Shandi, which was taken directly from his 1980 tape he sent into Kiss for his audition.

=== Tributes ===
As a tribute, the group's 1992 release Revenge featured what is said to be the only drum solo Carr ever recorded with the band, entitled "Carr Jam 1981", a jam session recorded for the Music From "The Elder" sessions (former Kiss guitarist Ace Frehley's original guitar part was overdubbed by Bruce Kulick). Much of the soloing was seasoned during Kiss' 1980 Unmasked Tour of Europe and Australia, and put down during the Music From "The Elder" sessions. Carr had for years been trying to get his hands on a copy of the solo for his personal collection, but his request was always rebuffed by Bob Ezrin with the excuse that he did not know where the masters for the session were. After Carr's death, the solo surfaced as "Carr Jam 1981".

The Revenge album was dedicated to Carr. He was also paid homage on the "Kiss My Ass" and Kissology 2 videos. However, the band declined a tribute concert that was requested by a circle of fans the year after his death. Simmons stated, "We didn't want to do a tribute concert. We are dedicating the album to his name, but no concerts in his name. It's not our style."

A further tribute was produced in 1992 called Eric Carr: The Memorial Tribute. It was first broadcast live on 88.1 FM / WCWP, where Carr had been interviewed three years earlier while doing press for the Hot in the Shade album. Running for approximately three hours, the tribute featured a re-broadcast of the interview, interspersed with biographical information and details of Carr's extracurricular projects, along with all the officially released songs Carr had written or cowritten. Though broadcast just once, Eric Carr: The Memorial Tribute was released several years later (seemingly in an unofficial capacity) as a two-tape box set, designed to resemble the Kiss solo albums. It featured a newly commissioned painting of Carr in his fox makeup, patterned after the rarely seen original by Eraldo Carugati (the artist who did the paintings for the original four Kiss solo album covers, plus one of Carr that was never officially released).

Only July 25, 1995, 15 years to the day of Carr's Kiss debut, he was posthumously inducted into the Rock Walk Hall of Fame at Guitar Center in Hollywood. Carr's parents, Albert and Connie Caravello, accepted a plaque in Carr's honor. Former Kiss guitarist Ace Frehley was inducted in the "Rock Walk" during the same ceremony. Frehley's handprint was placed to the right of the Kiss display. Carr's acknowledgment was a bronze plaque with his name, autograph and a separate icon of the Fox makeup he wore. Peter Criss was added to the Rock Walk in 1996, with his handprints placed to the left of the Kiss display.

On numerous solo tours since Carr's death, Frehley would play "Breakout" (with lyrics written by Carr and Frehley and later re-recorded as "Carr Jam '81" on Kiss's Revenge album) and dedicate it to Carr, who Frehley hopes is "checking out the show up there". Frehley also dedicated his 2009 solo album Anomaly to Carr.

There is a hidden "easter egg" in the 2007 Kissology II DVD collection (on disc three at the end of the production credits) showing a family videotape made of Carr, on his hospital bed, speaking into the camera thanking his fans for their cards, letters, and concern about his health. Dressed in white, Carr then exits the bed, and begins walking away only to return and moon the camera in rock n' roll style.

On March 21, 2011, a book that explored Carr's entire life and musical career was released, titled The Eric Carr Story.

On August 13, 2011, to commemorate the 20th anniversary of Carr's death, a tribute concert was held in Atlanta, Georgia called Night of the Fox: The Eric Carr Tribute Concert. The main act, going under the name Little Caesar, played a 90-minute set of songs related to Carr. Made up mostly of Kiss songs from Carr's time in the band, the show also featured a song from Rockology ("Eyes of Love") plus songs written or co-written by Carr but recorded by other artists, such as "Don't Leave Me Lonely", a song recorded by Bryan Adams which was written by Carr for inclusion on Creatures of the Night album, but was rejected. Also, a tribute album featuring never released songs and interviews called Unfinished Business was released by his family. The album featured members and former members of Kiss, Twisted Sister, Seether, ZO2, Europe. The album was released on November 8, 2011.

In July 2005, Carr was voted the tenth best drummer of all time by Planet Rock. No other member of Kiss was given the distinction of making the top ten in the categories of vocalist, bassist or guitarist. Carr was one of only two American drummers to make the list, with all others being either British or Canadian.

Bruce Kulick released a YouTube video titled Eric Carr "The Legend Lives On" (30th Anniversary Tribute) in 2021.

On November 9, 2023, the first book in an unauthorized biographical series, Eric Carr Revealed, was published. "The Rise of the Fox" explores Carr's life in detail from his birth in 1950 up to Kiss entering the studio to record the 1982 album Creatures of the Night.

On January 9, 2024, Goldmine (magazine) placed Carr fourth on a list of drummers who improved or transformed existing bands when they joined.

== Discography ==
=== With Kiss ===
- 1981: Music from "The Elder"
- 1982: Killers – compilation album featuring 4 newly recorded tracks
- 1982: Creatures of the Night
- 1983: Lick It Up
- 1984: Animalize
- 1985: Asylum
- 1987: Crazy Nights
- 1988: Chikara
- 1988: Smashes, Thrashes & Hits – compilation album featuring 2 newly recorded tracks, vocals on "Beth" remake
- 1989: Hot in the Shade
- 1992: Revenge – backing vocals on "God Gave Rock 'N' Roll to You II", drums on "Carr Jam 1981"
- 1996: You Wanted the Best, You Got the Best!! – drums on "New York Groove"
- 2001: The Box Set
- 2002: The Very Best of Kiss
- 2004: The Best of Kiss, Volume 2: The Millennium Collection
- 2005: Gold
- 2023: Off the Soundboard: Live In Poughkeepsie NY 1984
- 2025: Off the Soundboard: Live In San Antonio, Texas 1985

==== Kiss video albums ====
- 1985: Animalize Live Uncensored
- 1987: Exposed
- 1988: Crazy Nights
- 1994: Kiss My Ass: The Video
- 2007: Kissology Volume Two: 1978–1991

=== Solo ===
- 1999: Rockology
- 2011: Unfinished Business

=== Other albums ===
- 1979: Lightning (Lightning) – backing vocals and drums on all tracks
- 1983: Bryan Adams (Cuts Like a Knife) – cowrote "Don't Leave Me Lonely"
- 1984: Wendy O. Williams (WOW) – cowrote "Ain't None of Your Business", drums on "Legends Never Die"
- 1987: Frehley's Comet (Frehley's Comet) – cowrote "Breakout"
- 1998: Garbo Talks (Garbo Talks) – drums on "Game of Love"
- 2000: Various artists (Prophecy: A Tribute to Eric Carr) – drums on "Your Turn to Cry"
- 2008: Faith Circus (Faith Circus) – cowrote "Can You Feel It"

=== Unreleased recordings ===
Carr's family announced in 2006 that they would release material written and recorded by Carr between 1980 and 1991, including the following songs:

- "Elephant Man"
- "Dial L for Love"
- "Midnight Stranger"
- "The Troubles Inside You"
- "Tiara" (Demo)

The first four songs were released on the 2011 album, Unfinished Business, while "Tiara" appeared on the 1999 album, Rockology.

Preceded by Peter Criss	Drummer for Kiss; 1980–1991	Succeeded by Eric Singer
