= List of songs recorded by Kiss =

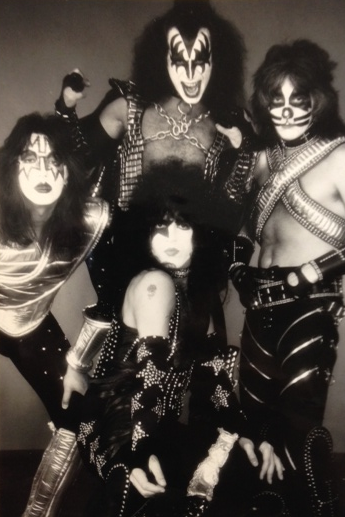
The original lineup of Kiss in 1977. Clockwise from top: Gene Simmons, Peter Criss, Paul Stanley and Ace Frehley.

Kiss was an American hard rock band from New York. Formed in January 1973, the group originally included rhythm guitarist and vocalist Paul Stanley, bassist and vocalist Gene Simmons, lead guitarist Ace Frehley and drummer Peter Criss. Songwriting is typically led by Stanley and Simmons, who also perform the majority of lead vocals, although all members regularly contribute. The band's self-titled debut album featured two songwriting credits for Frehley, and one for Criss ("Cold Gin" and "Love Theme from Kiss", the latter being credited to all four members), as well as a cover version of Bobby Rydell's "Kissin' Time". Frehley wrote or co-wrote three songs on Hotter than Hell, and two on 1975's Dressed to Kill. For Destroyer, the band worked closely with producer Bob Ezrin, who was credited for songwriting on seven of the album's nine tracks.

Rock and Roll Over, released in 1976, was again led by Stanley and Simmons, with Sean Delaney co-credited alongside the former on three tracks. 1977's Love Gun featured a writing credit each for Frehley and Criss, as well as a cover of "Then She Kissed Me", originally by The Crystals. After each member released an eponymous solo album in 1978, Kiss returned in 1979 with Dynasty, which featured session drummer Anton Fig in place of the injured Criss. Fig also performed on Unmasked the following year, by which time Criss had left Kiss. Unmasked included several songwriters from outside of the band, including producer Vini Poncia on all but three tracks. Following the addition of Eric Carr on drums, the band released Music from "The Elder" in 1981, which was the last to feature Frehley who departed the following year.

Frehley was replaced by Vinnie Vincent, who first wrote and performed on Creatures of the Night in 1982. The album also featured two songs co-written by Bryan Adams and Jim Vallance. Vincent remained for the 1983 follow-up Lick It Up, although left after the album's touring cycle. He was replaced for Animalize by Mark St. John, which included songs co-written by Desmond Child, Mitch Weissman and Jean Beauvoir. Bruce Kulick debuted on Asylum as the band's fourth lead guitarist, which again included credits for Child and Beauvoir. Crazy Nights and Hot in the Shade featured returning contributors Poncia, Child and Weissman, as well as new additions such as Tommy Thayer, Michael Bolton and Bob Halligan Jr. Carr died of cancer on November 24, 1991, with Eric Singer taking over as the band's drummer.

The band's 1992 release Revenge was largely co-written with Ezrin, who had returned as producer. In 1996, Frehley and Criss returned for an original lineup reunion tour. The group released Psycho Circus in 1998, which was primarily written by Stanley and Simmons with contributions from Curtis Cuomo, Holly Knight, Karl Cochran, Ezrin and Kulick. By 2004, the lineup of Kiss included lead guitarist Thayer and drummer Singer. The group's next studio album followed in 2009 – Sonic Boom was written entirely by the band's members, with all but Singer credited. 2012's Monster credited the drummer on just one track, "Back to the Stone Age", which was written by the whole band. In early 2015, Kiss released a single in collaboration with Japanese idol group Momoiro Clover Z entitled "Yume no Ukiyo ni Saite Mi na".

== Songs ==
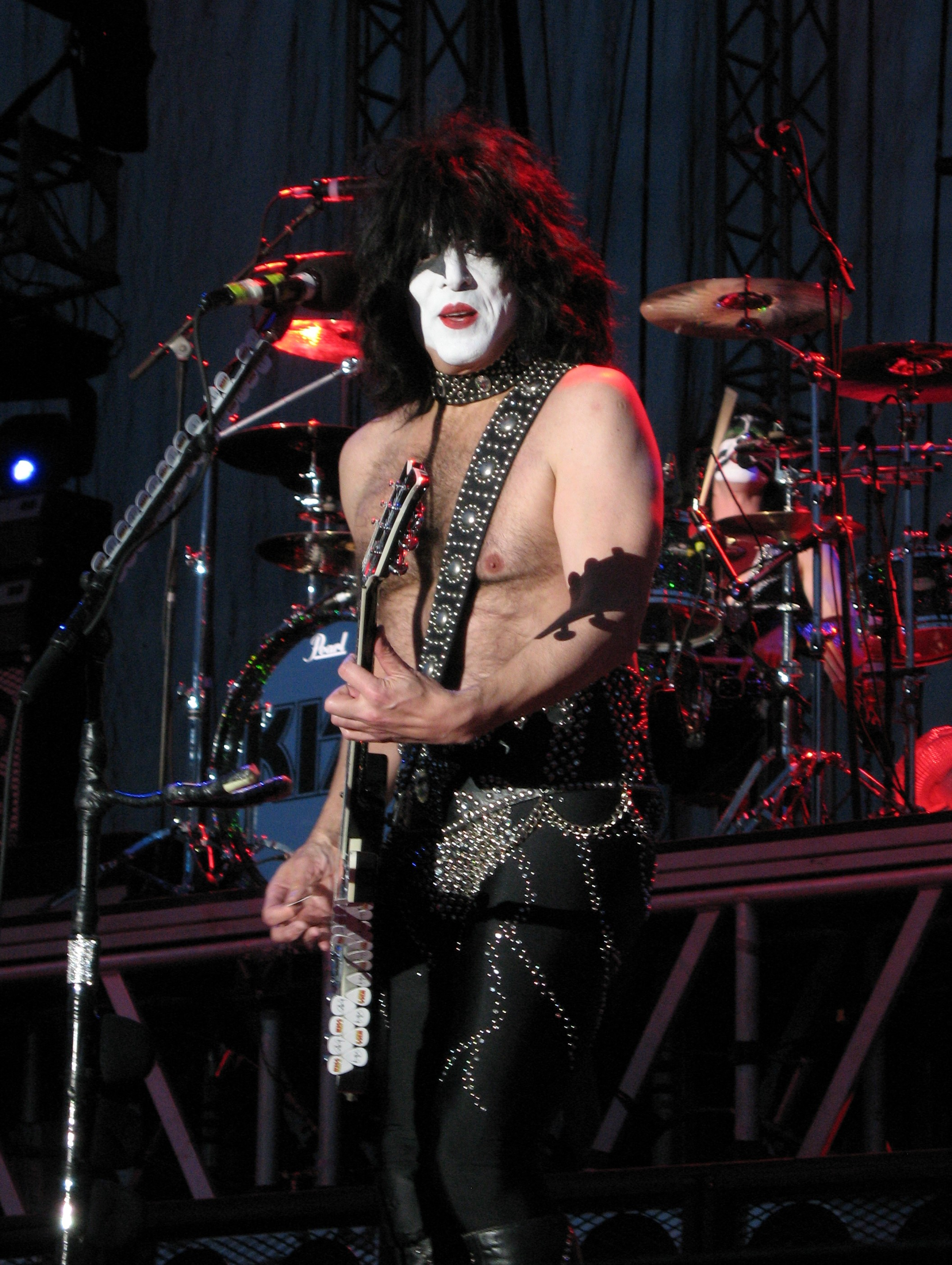
Rhythm guitarist Paul Stanley, the primary songwriter in Kiss, has written (or co-written) and performed lead (or co-lead) vocals on over 120 songs for the band.

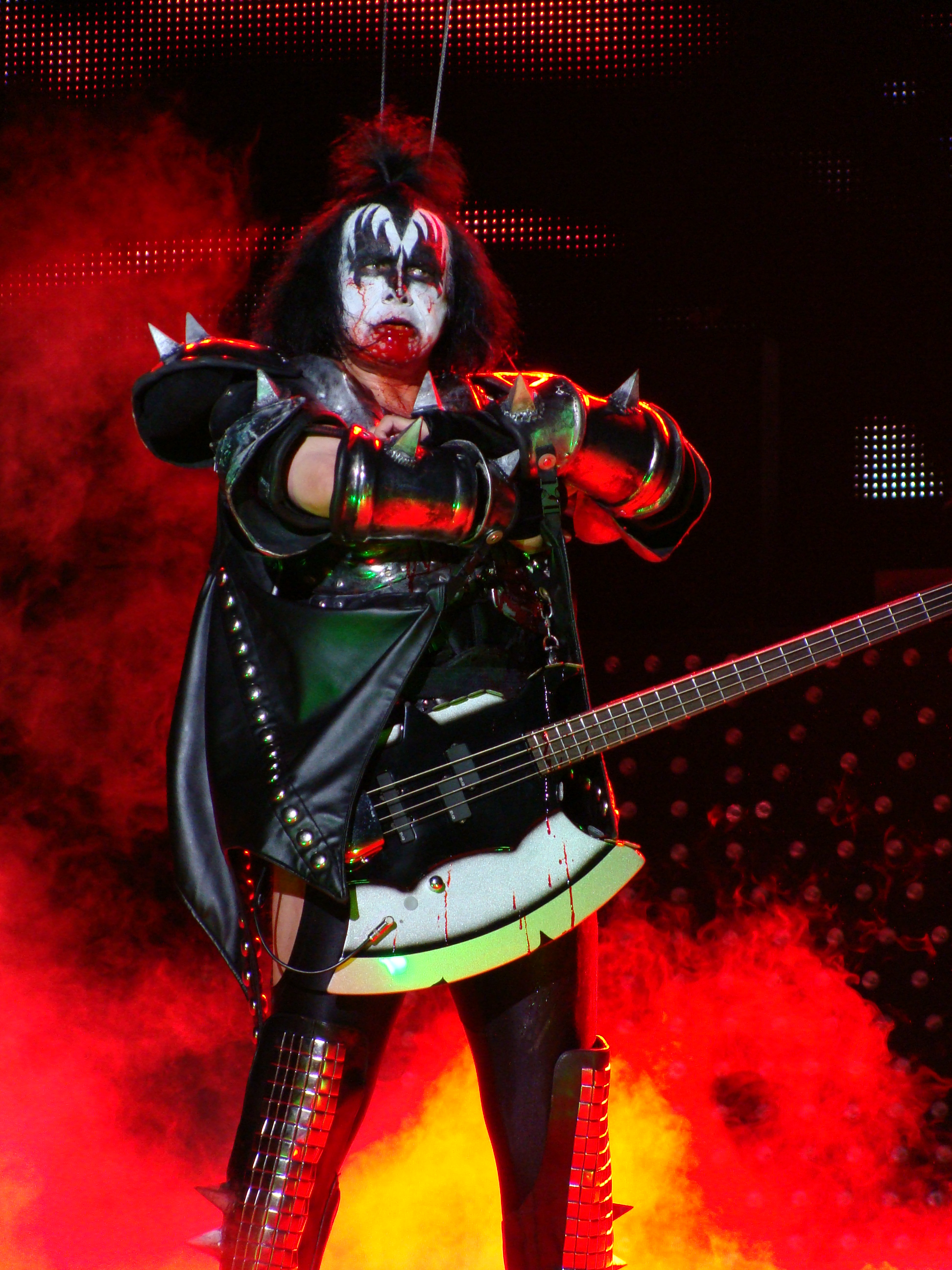
Bassist Gene Simmons is the second main songwriter and vocalist in the band, with writing credits on over 100 songs and singing credits on over 90.

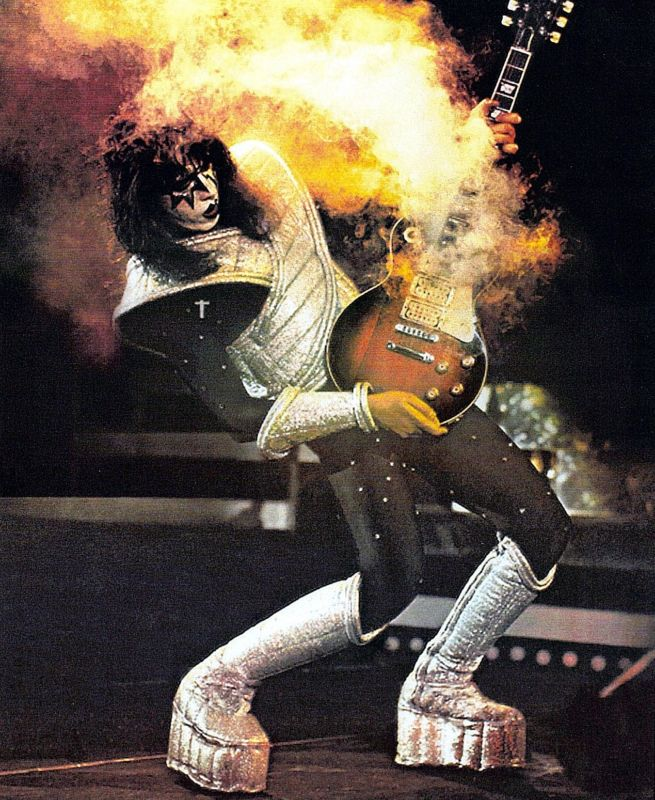
Original lead guitarist Ace Frehley wrote or co-wrote 18 and performed lead vocals on 12 songs during his two tenures.

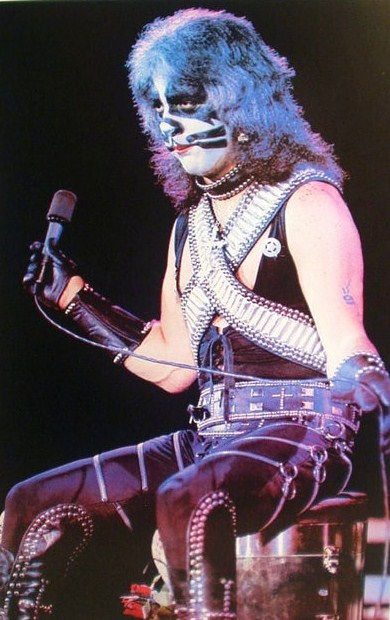
Peter Criss, the original Kiss drummer, wrote only five tracks for the band, but performed vocals on a total of thirteen.

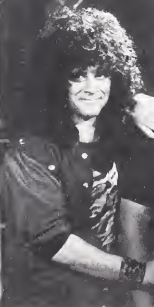
Drummer Eric Carr co-wrote 8 songs and wrote Carr Jam 1981 for the band and performed lead vocals on "Little Caesar", Smashes, Thrashes & Hits cover of "Beth" and "Ain't That Peculiar"(The Box Set).

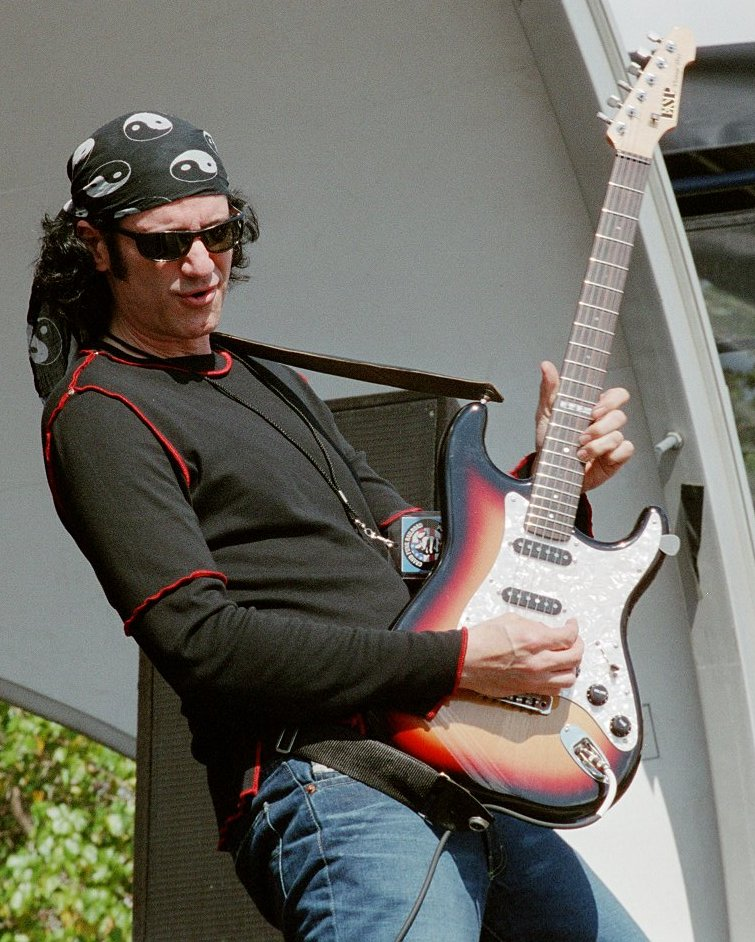
Guitarist Bruce Kulick co-wrote 20 songs for Kiss, both as a band member and as a guest contributor, and performed lead vocals on "I Walk Alone".

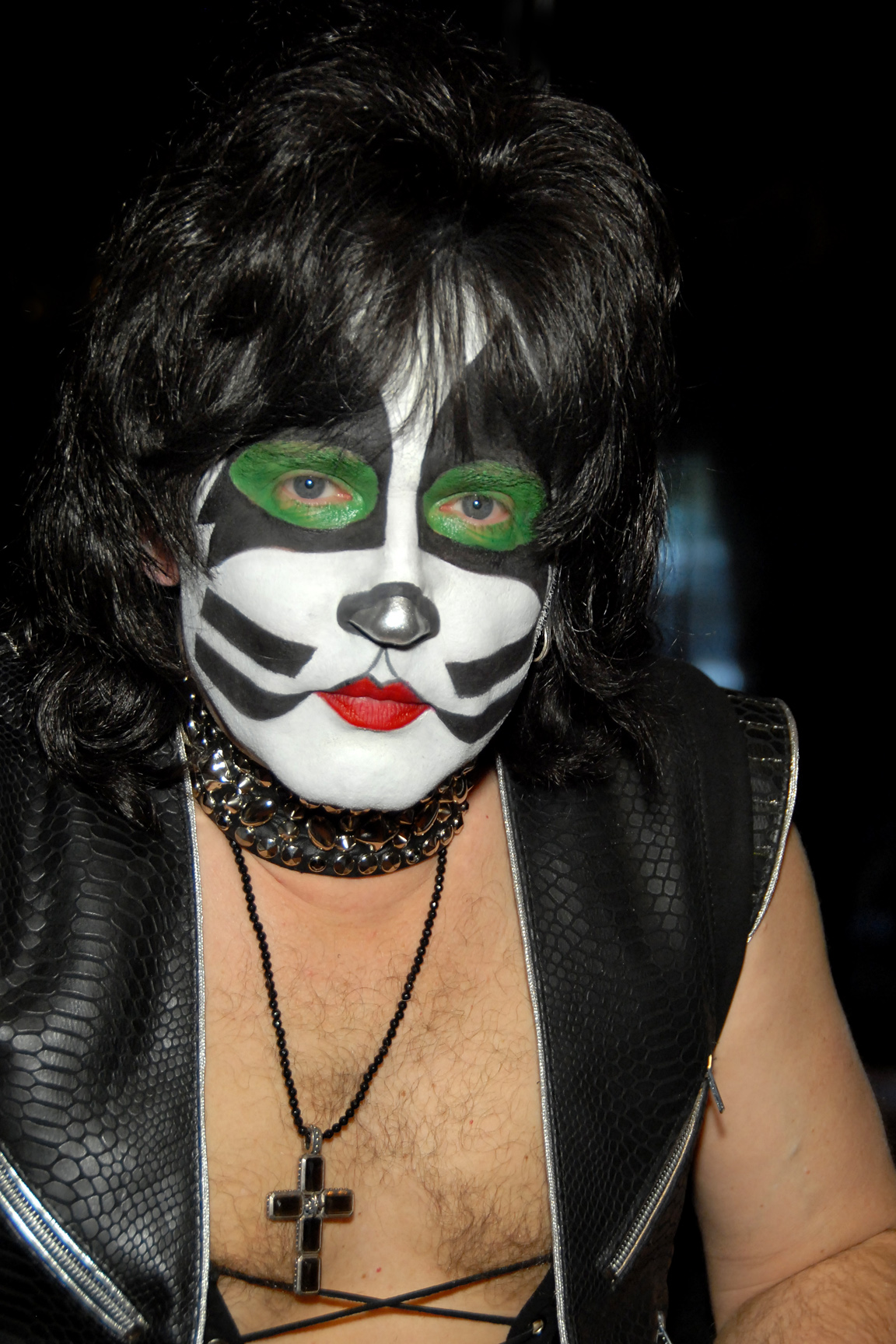
The band's current drummer Eric Singer is featured as a co-writer on only one Kiss track, "Back to the Stone Age", which is credited to the whole group.

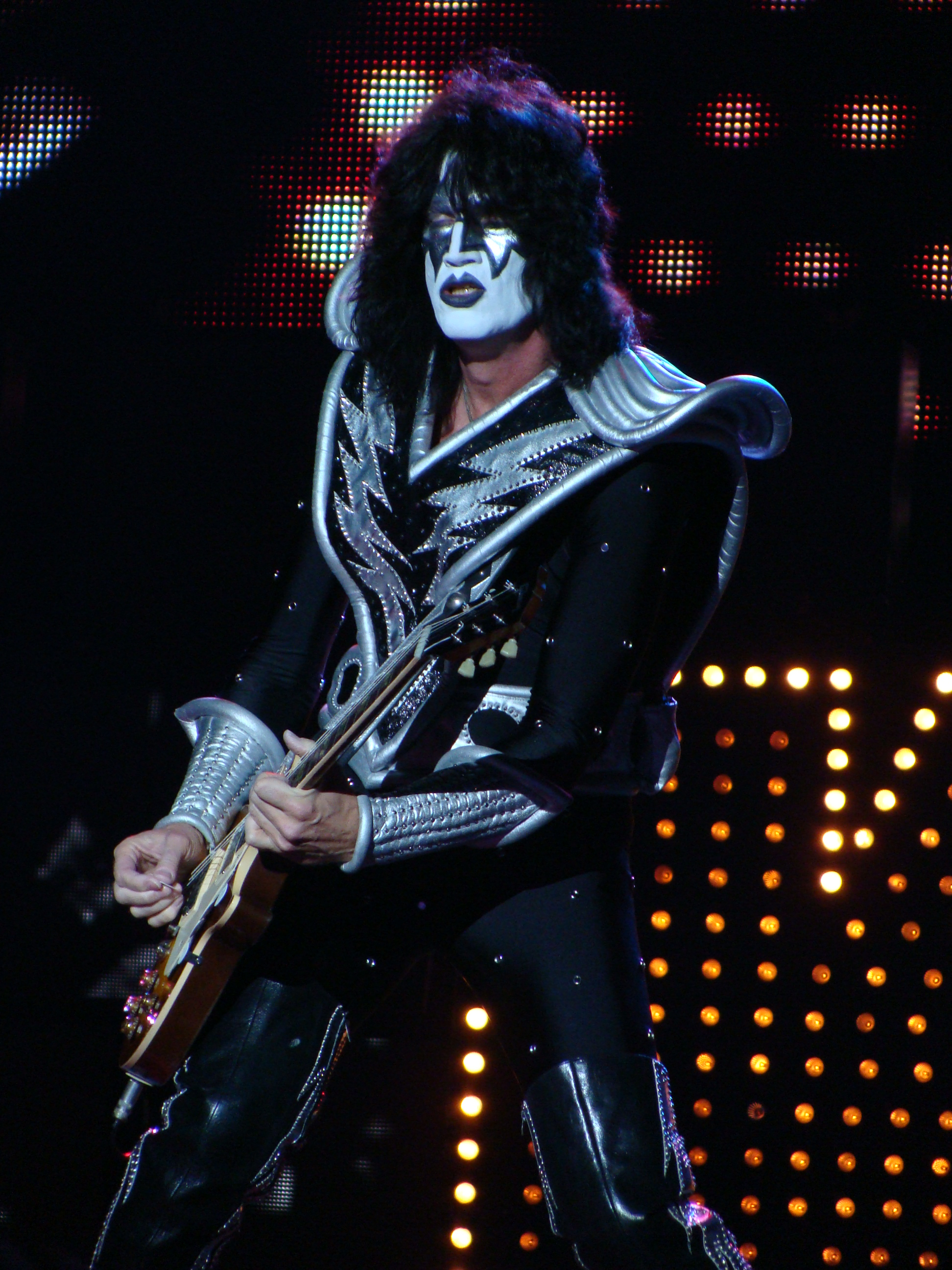
Tommy Thayer has written or co-written 16 songs for the group since 1989, as well as singing on two ("Outta This World" and "When Lightning Strikes").

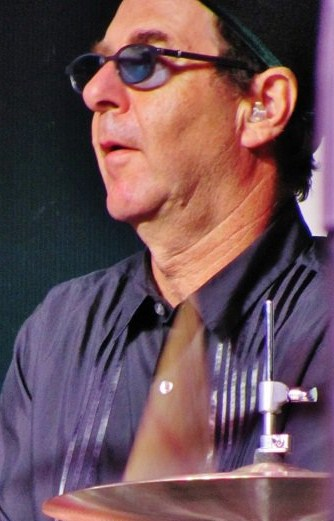
Anton Fig performed drums on Dynasty and Unmasked, and co-wrote the song "Dark Light" for Music from "The Elder".

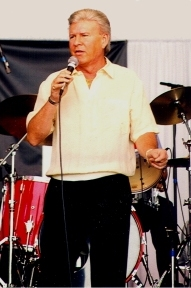
Kiss covered Bobby Rydell's "Kissin' Time" for their 1974 self-titled debut album.

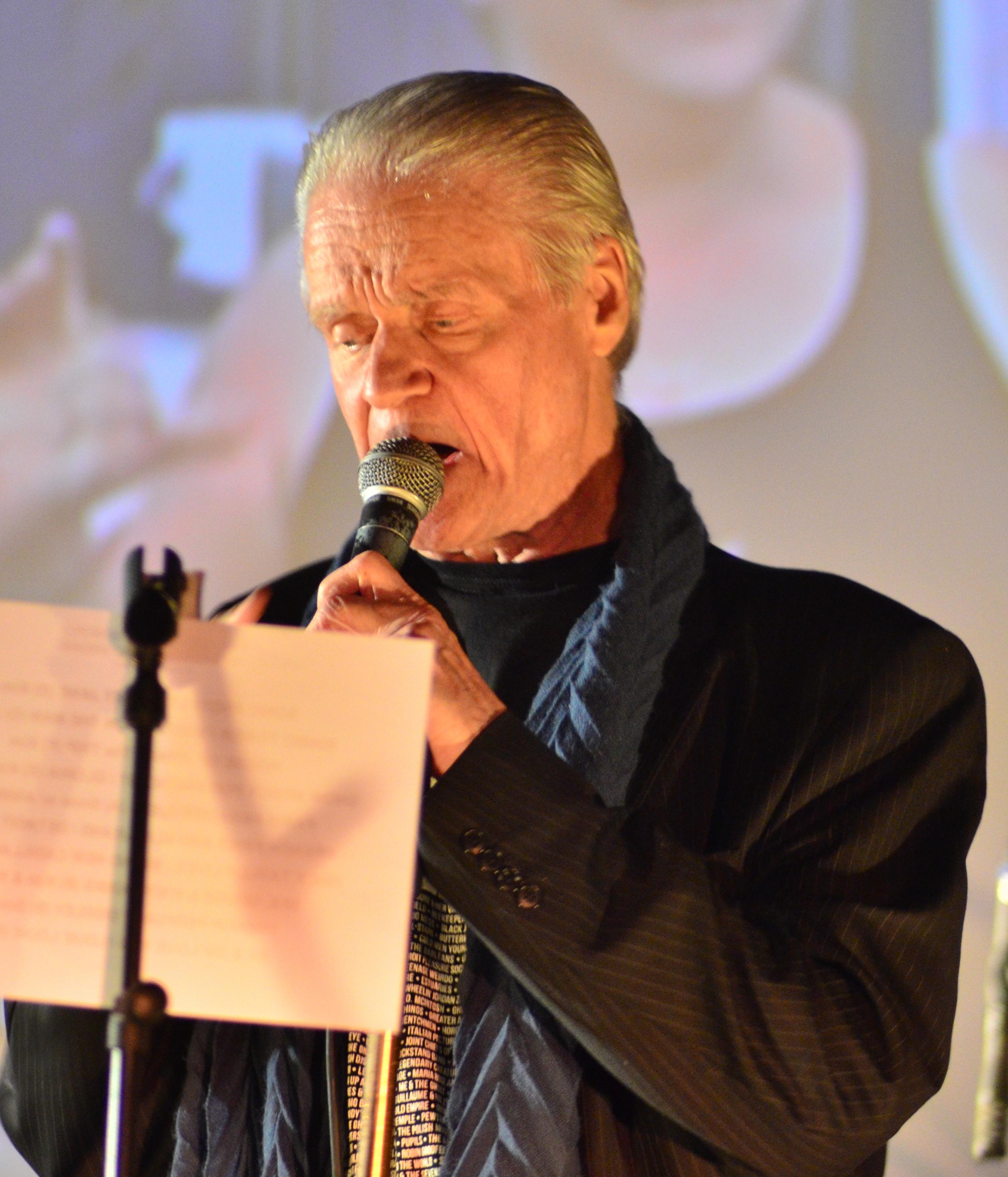
Kim Fowley co-wrote two songs on 1976's Destroyer – "King of the Night Time World" and "Do You Love Me".

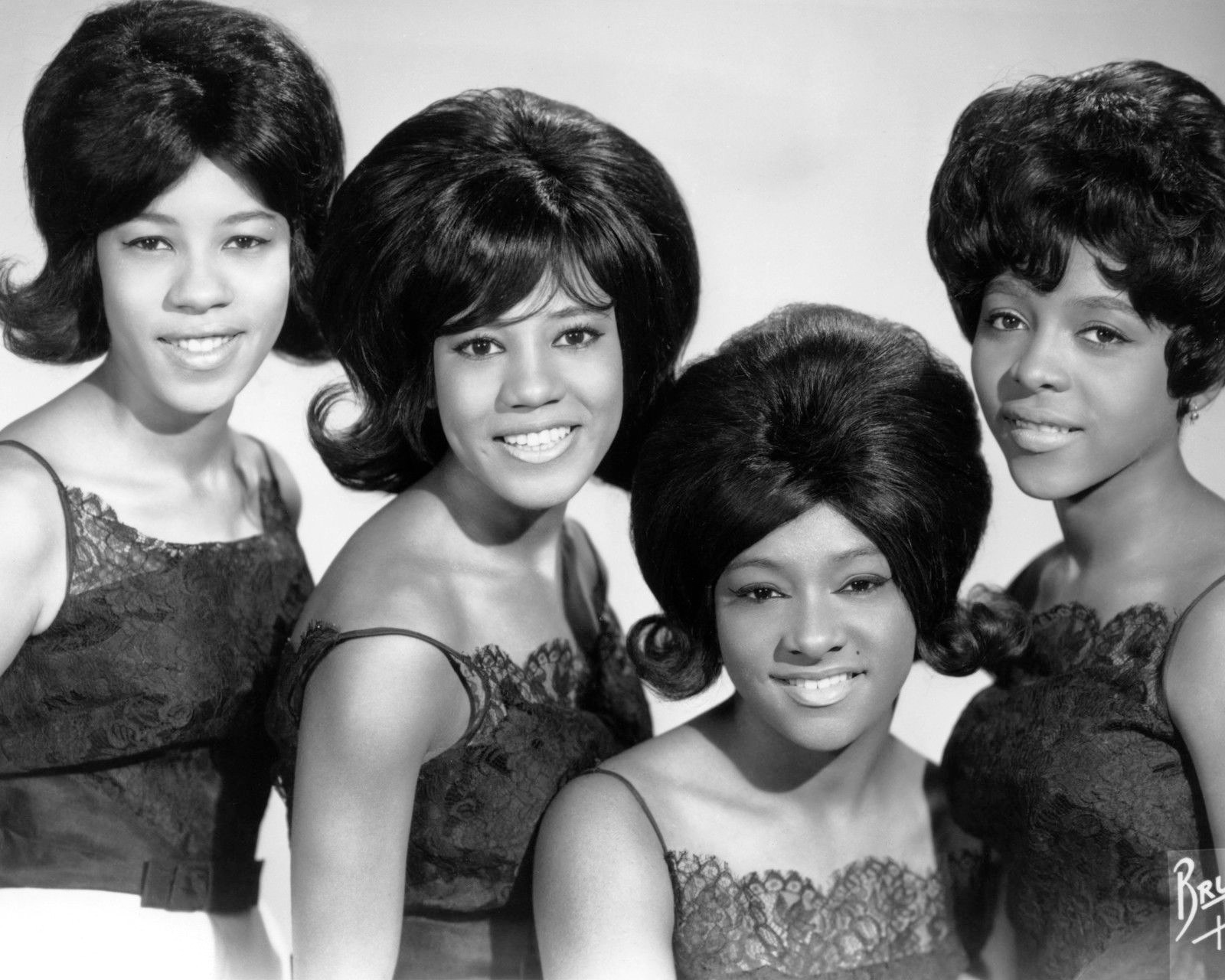
Kiss recorded a cover of "Then He Kissed Me", originally by The Crystals, under the title "Then She Kissed Me", for the 1977 album Love Gun.

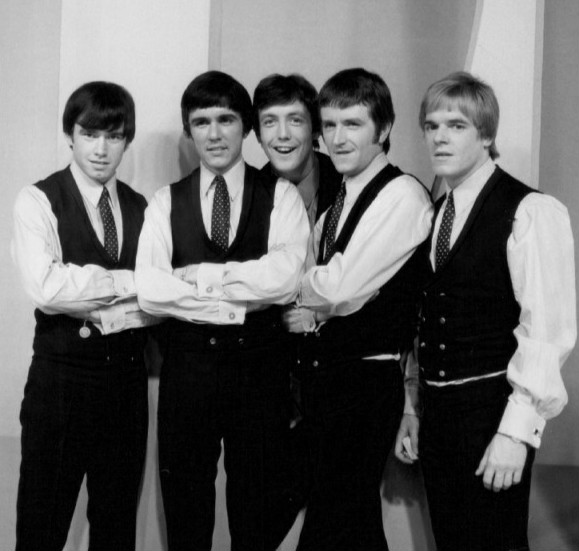
Alive II features a recording of The Dave Clark Five's "Any Way You Want It", written by the eponymous frontman.

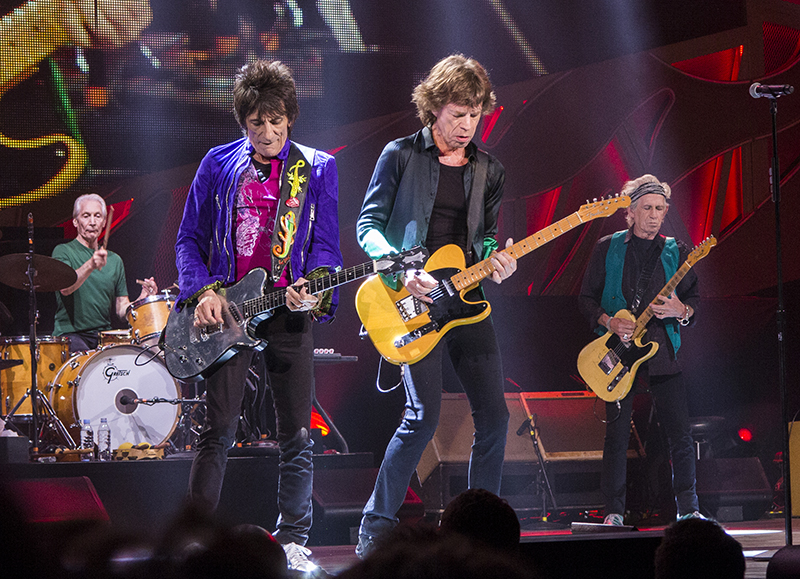
The 1979 album Dynasty included a cover of The Rolling Stones song "2,000 Man".

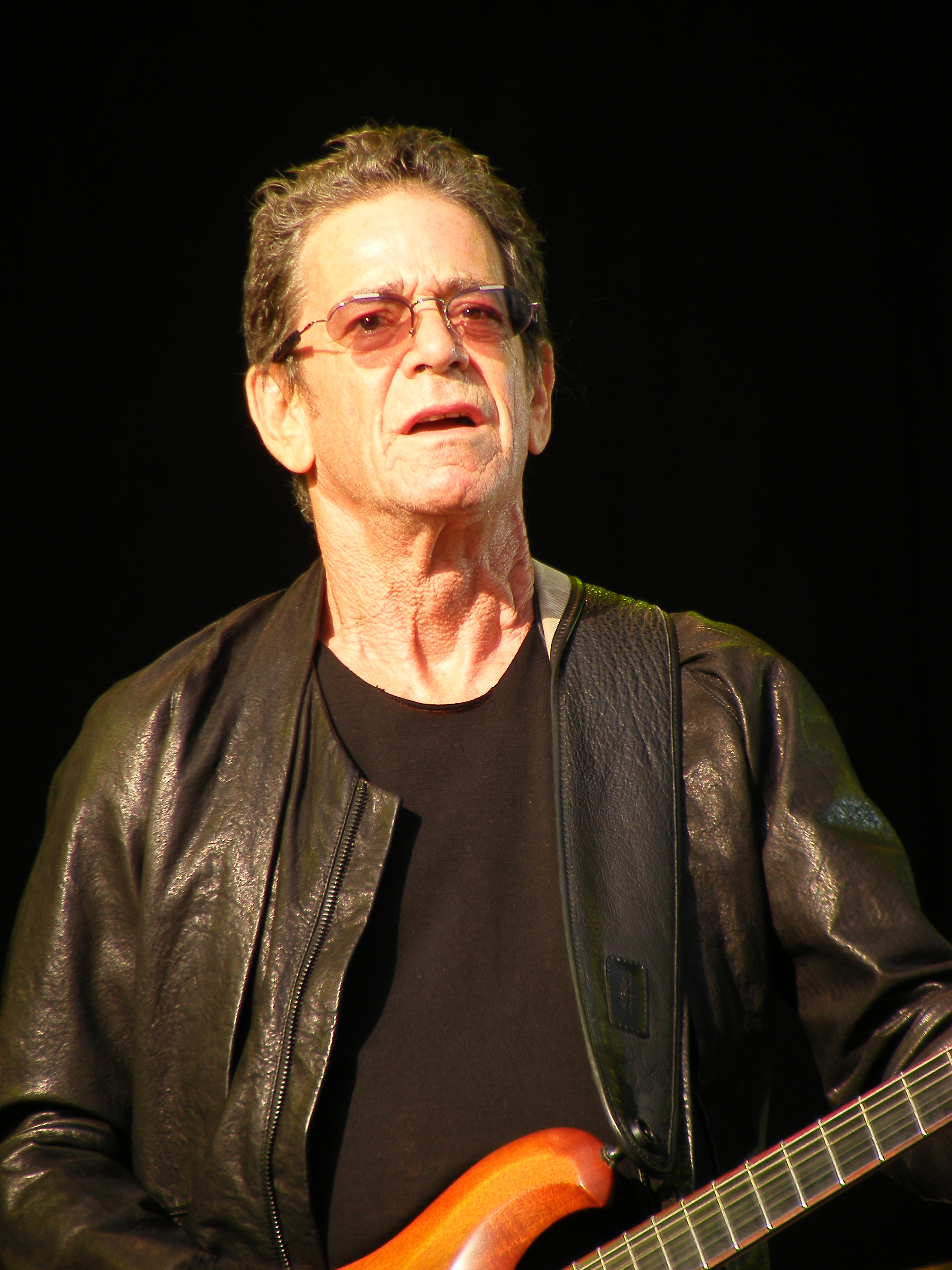
Lou Reed contributed to songwriting for three tracks on Music from "The Elder".

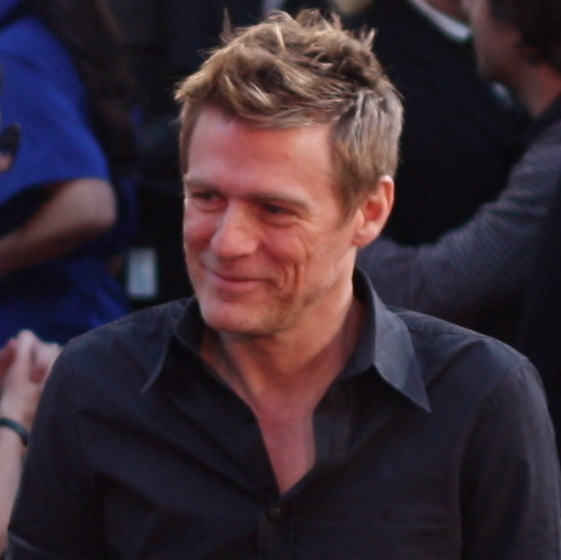
Bryan Adams co-wrote three songs for the 1982 releases Killers and Creatures of the Night.

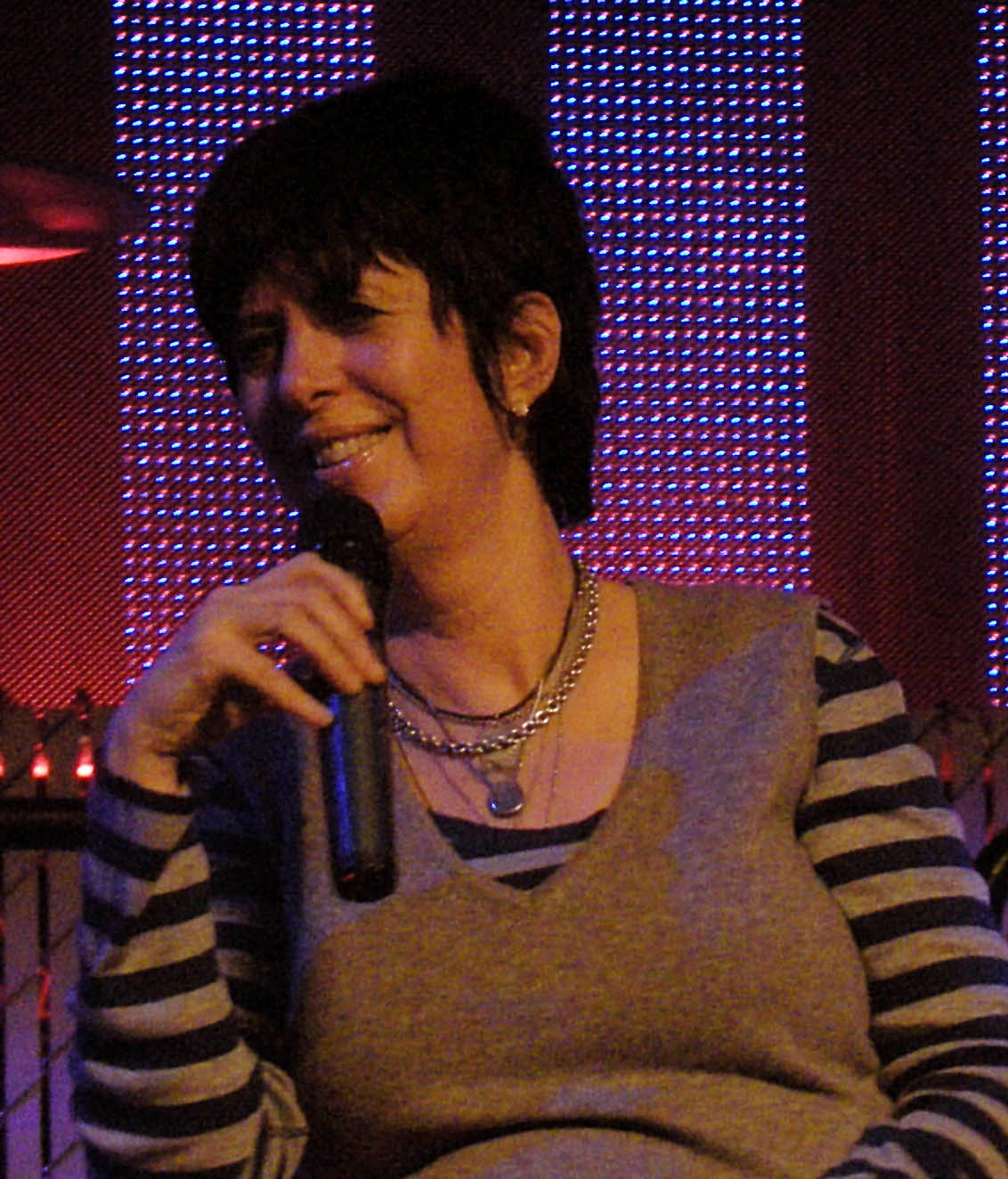
Diane Warren co-wrote the singles "Turn On the Night" and "(You Make Me) Rock Hard", as well as writing "Nothing Can Keep Me from You" for the 1999 film Detroit Rock City.

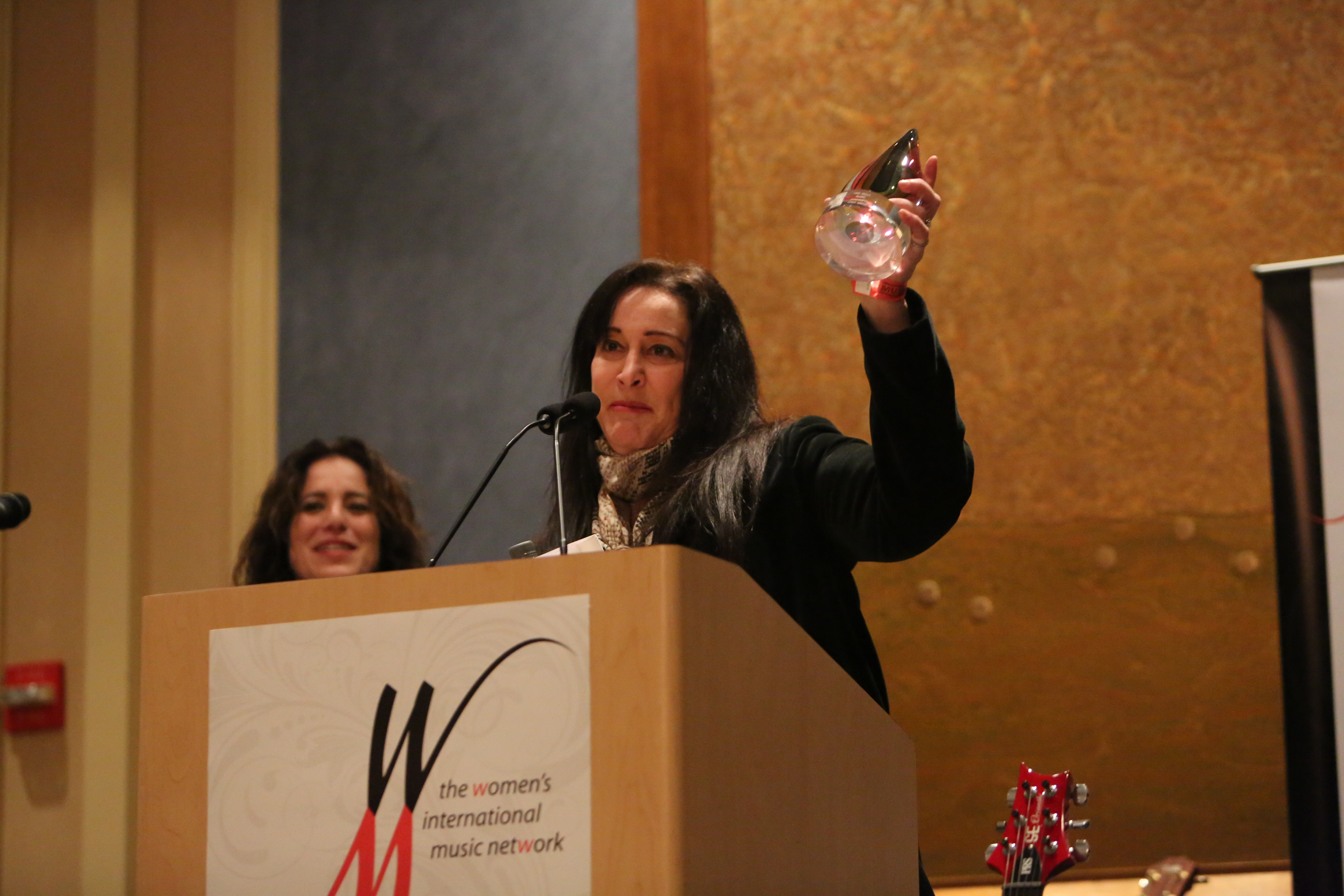
Holly Knight co-wrote one song for 1989's Hot in the Shade and two for 1998's Psycho Circus.

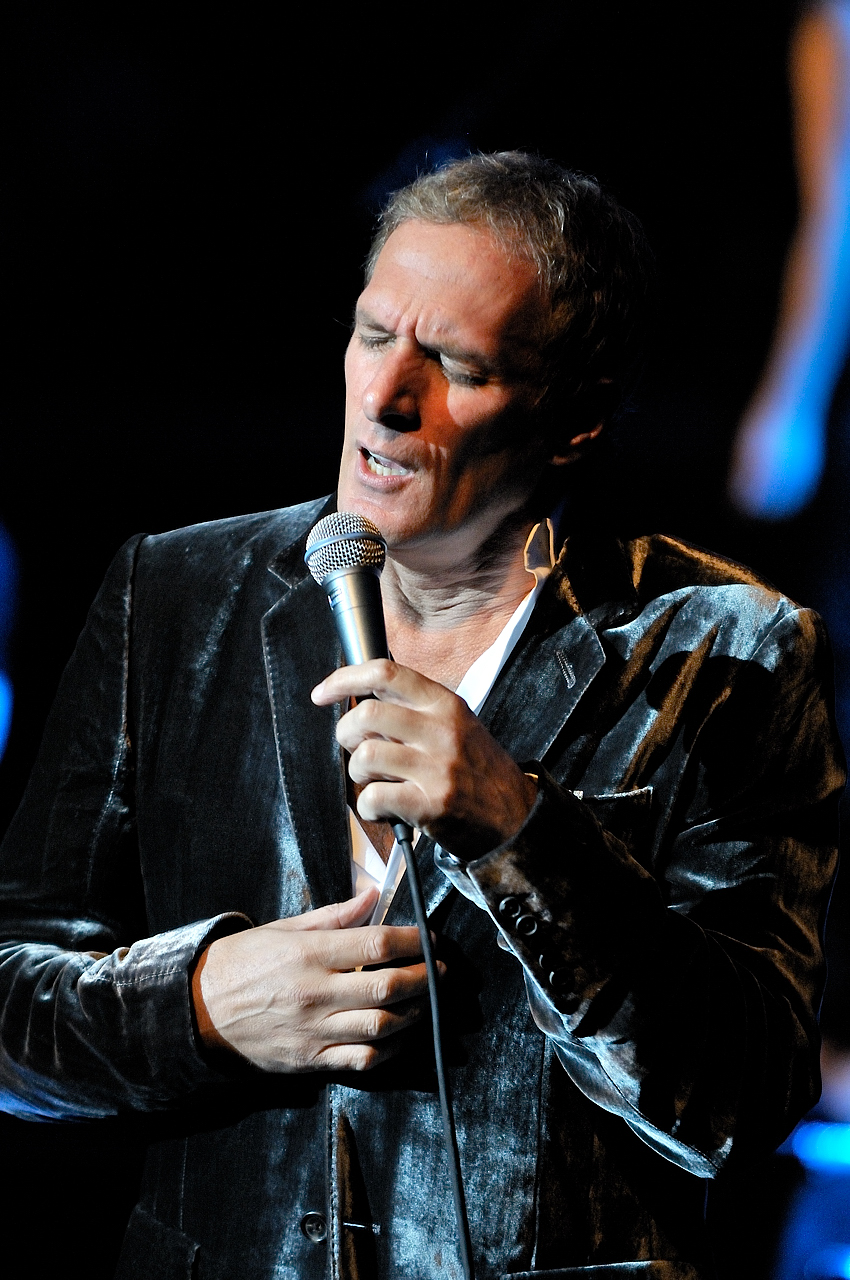
Michael Bolton wrote the 1990 single "Forever" with Stanley.

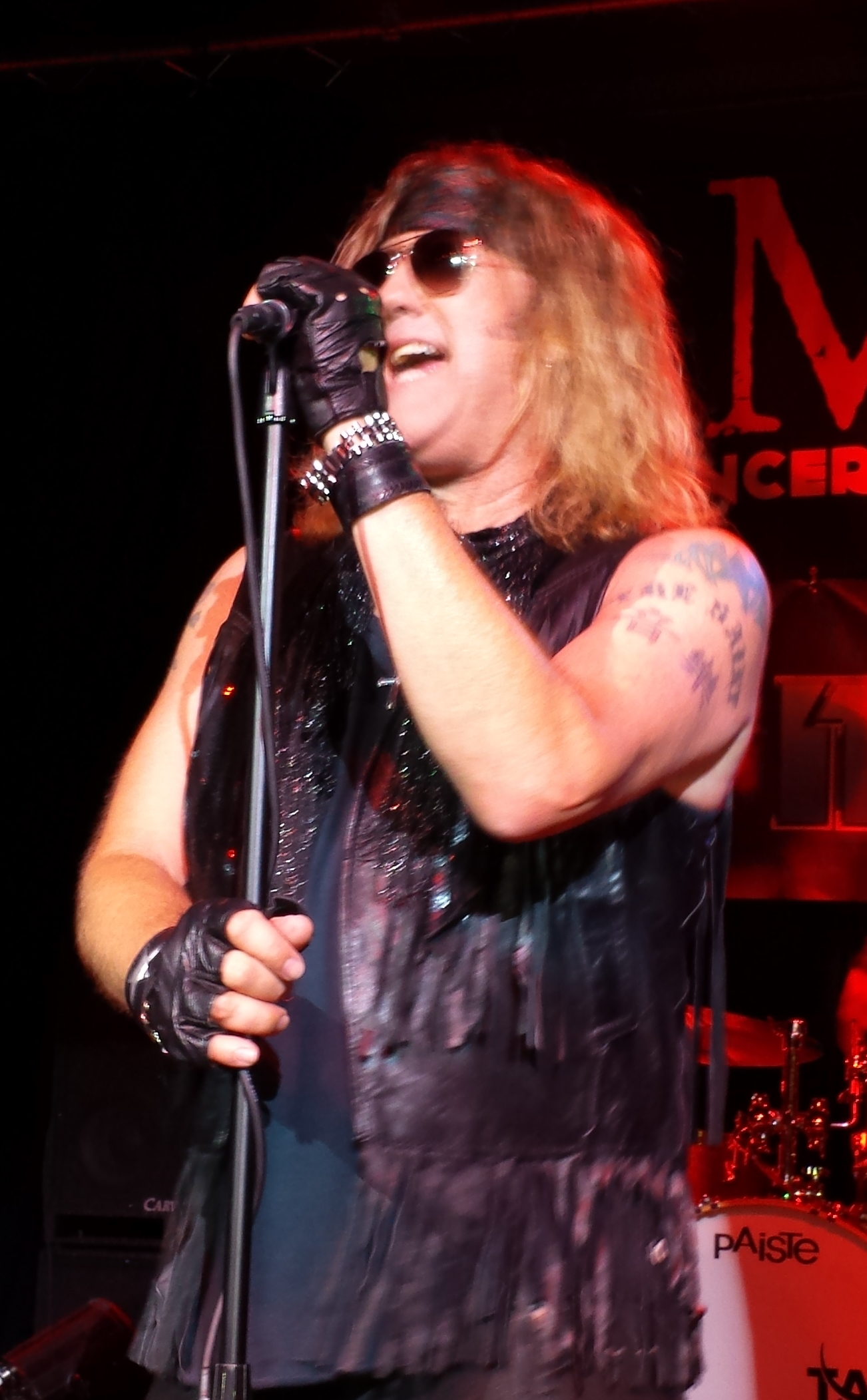
Black 'n Blue frontman Jaime St. James co-wrote "In My Head", released on 1997's Carnival of Souls: The Final Sessions.

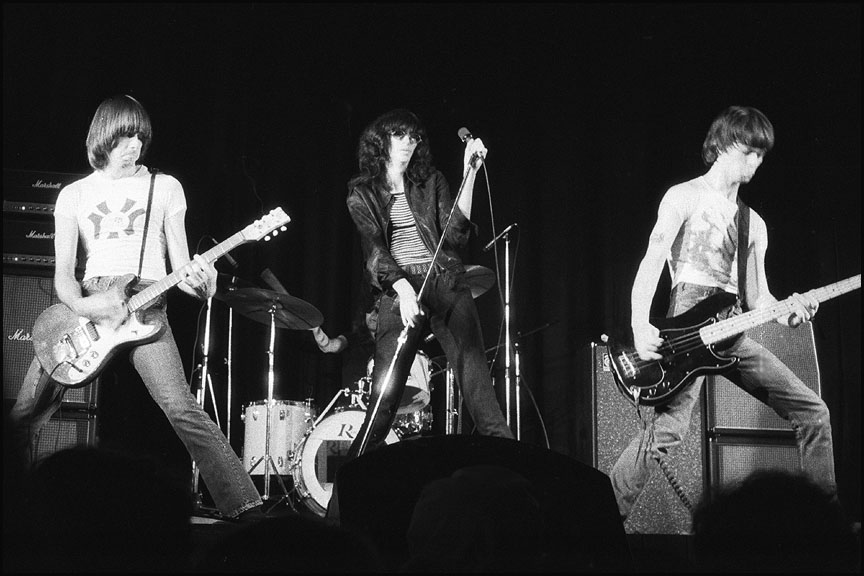
Kiss covered the Ramones song "Do You Remember Rock 'n' Roll Radio?" for the 2003 tribute album We're a Happy Family: A Tribute to Ramones.

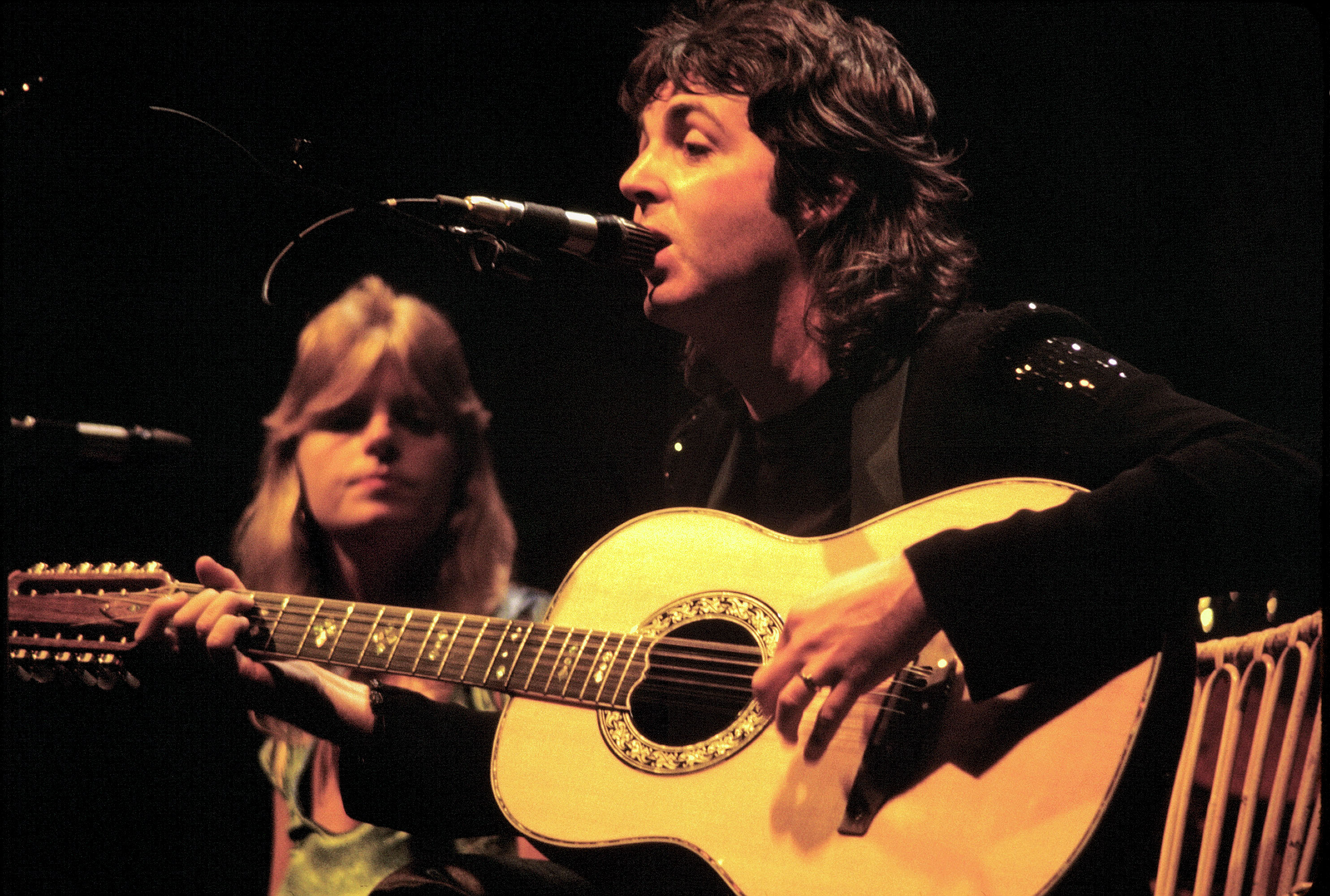
In 2014, the band contributed a recording of the Wings track "Venus and Mars/Rock Show", written by Paul and Linda McCartney, to the tribute album The Art of McCartney.

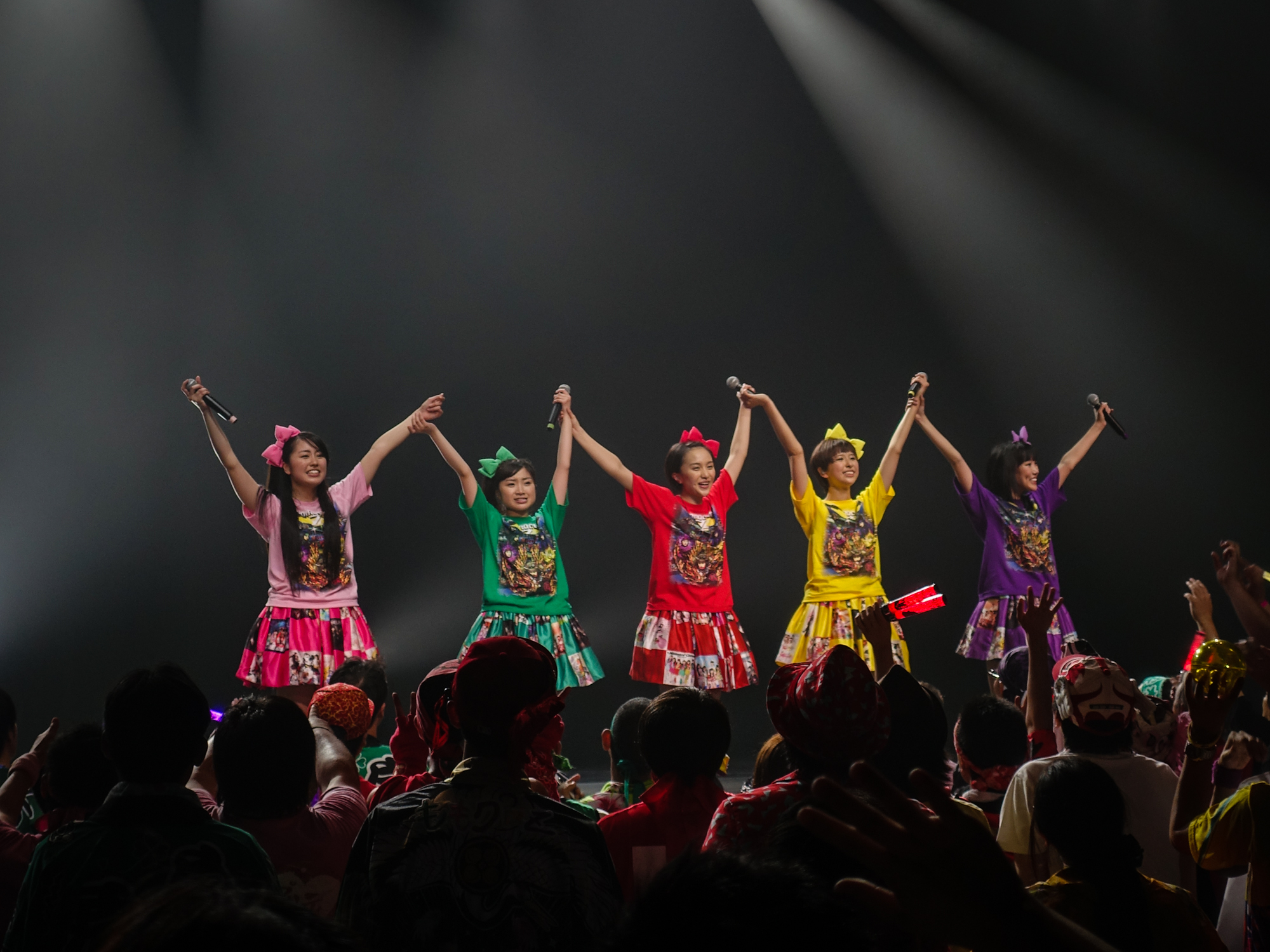
The band collaborated with Japanese idol group Momoiro Clover Z for the single "Yume no Ukiyo ni Saite Mi na", released in 2015 with B-side "Samurai Son".

Key
†	Indicates song released as a single

List of songs recorded by Kiss, with writer(s), lead vocalist(s), original release and year
Title	Writer(s)	Lead vocalist(s)	Release	Year	Ref.
"100,000 Years"	Paul Stanley; Gene Simmons	Paul Stanley	Kiss	1974	
"2,000 Man" (The Rolling Stones cover)	Mick Jagger; Keith Richards	Ace Frehley	Dynasty	1979	
"Ain't That Peculiar"	Eric Carr; Smokey Robinson; Pete Moore; Bobby Rogers; Marv Tarplin	Eric Carr	The Box Set	2001	
"All American Man"	Paul Stanley; Sean Delaney	Paul Stanley	Alive II	1977	
"All for the Glory"	Paul Stanley; Gene Simmons	Eric Singer	Sonic Boom	2009	
"All for the Love of Rock & Roll"	Paul Stanley	Eric Singer	Monster	2012	
"All Hell's Breakin' Loose" †	Eric Carr; Paul Stanley; Vinnie Vincent; Gene Simmons	Paul Stanley	Lick It Up	1983	
"All the Way"	Gene Simmons	Gene Simmons	Hotter than Hell	1974	
"Almost Human"	Gene Simmons	Gene Simmons	Love Gun	1977	
"And on the 8th Day"	Gene Simmons; Vinnie Vincent	Gene Simmons	Lick It Up	1983	
"Any Way You Slice It"	Gene Simmons; Howard Rice	Gene Simmons	Asylum	1985	
"Any Way You Want It" (The Dave Clark Five cover)	Dave Clark	Paul Stanley	Alive II	1977	
"Anything for My Baby"	Paul Stanley	Paul Stanley	Dressed to Kill	1975	
"Baby Driver"	Peter Criss; Stan Penridge	Peter Criss	Rock and Roll Over	1976	
"Back to the Stone Age"	Gene Simmons; Paul Stanley; Tommy Thayer; Eric Singer	Gene Simmons	Monster	2012	
"Bad, Bad Lovin'"	Gene Simmons	Gene Simmons	The Box Set	2001	
"Bang Bang You"	Paul Stanley; Desmond Child	Paul Stanley	Crazy Nights	1987	
"Beth" †	Peter Criss; Stan Penridge; Bob Ezrin	Peter Criss	Destroyer	1976	
"Beth"	Peter Criss; Stan Penridge; Bob Ezrin	Eric Carr	Smashes, Thrashes & Hits	1988	
"Betrayed"	Gene Simmons; Tommy Thayer	Gene Simmons	Hot in the Shade	1989	
"Black Diamond"	Paul Stanley	Peter Criss; Paul Stanley	Kiss	1974	
"Boomerang"	Gene Simmons; Bruce Kulick	Gene Simmons	Hot in the Shade	1989	
"Burn Bitch Burn"	Gene Simmons	Gene Simmons	Animalize	1984	
"C'mon and Love Me" †	Paul Stanley	Paul Stanley	Dressed to Kill	1975	
"Cadillac Dreams"	Gene Simmons; Vini Poncia	Gene Simmons	Hot in the Shade	1989	
"Calling Dr. Love" †	Gene Simmons	Gene Simmons	Rock and Roll Over	1976	
"Carr Jam 1981"	Eric Carr	none (instrumental)	Revenge	1992	
"Charisma"	Gene Simmons; Howard Marks	Gene Simmons	Dynasty	1979	
"Childhood's End"	Gene Simmons; Tommy Thayer; Bruce Kulick	Gene Simmons	Carnival of Souls: The Final Sessions	1997	
"Christine Sixteen" †	Gene Simmons	Gene Simmons	Love Gun	1977	
"Cold Gin"	Ace Frehley	Gene Simmons	Kiss	1974	
"Comin' Home"	Paul Stanley; Ace Frehley	Paul Stanley	Hotter than Hell	1974	
"Crazy Crazy Nights" †	Paul Stanley; Adam Mitchell	Paul Stanley	Crazy Nights	1987	
"Creatures of the Night" †	Paul Stanley; Adam Mitchell	Paul Stanley	Creatures of the Night	1982	
"Dance All Over Your Face"	Gene Simmons	Gene Simmons	Lick It Up	1983	
"Danger"	Paul Stanley; Adam Mitchell	Paul Stanley	Creatures of the Night	1982	
"Danger Us"	Paul Stanley	Paul Stanley	Sonic Boom	2009	
"Dark Light"	Ace Frehley; Gene Simmons; Anton Fig; Lou Reed	Ace Frehley	Music from "The Elder"	1981	
"Detroit Rock City" †	Paul Stanley; Bob Ezrin	Paul Stanley	Destroyer	1976	
"Deuce"	Gene Simmons	Gene Simmons	Kiss	1974	
"The Devil Is Me"	Gene Simmons; Paul Stanley; Tommy Thayer	Gene Simmons	Monster	2012	
"Dirty Livin'"	Peter Criss; Stan Penridge; Vini Poncia	Peter Criss	Dynasty	1979	
"Do You Love Me"	Paul Stanley; Kim Fowley; Bob Ezrin	Paul Stanley	Destroyer	1976	
"Do You Remember Rock 'n' Roll Radio?" (Ramones cover)	Dee Dee Ramone; Johnny Ramone; Joey Ramone	Paul Stanley	We're a Happy Family: A Tribute to Ramones	2003	
"Domino" †	Gene Simmons	Gene Simmons	Revenge	1992	
"Don't Touch My Ascot" (with Greg Collins and Jared Faber)	Tony Cervone; Greg Collins; Jared Faber	Paul Stanley; Gene Simmons; Tommy Thayer; Eric Singer; Greg Collins; Jared Faber	Scooby-Doo! and Kiss: Rock and Roll Mystery	2015	
"Doncha Hesitate"	Paul Stanley	Paul Stanley	The Box Set	2001	
"Down on Your Knees"	Paul Stanley; Mikel Japp; Bryan Adams	Paul Stanley	Killers	1982	
"Dreamin'"	Paul Stanley; Bruce Kulick	Paul Stanley	Psycho Circus	1998	
"Easy as It Seems"	Paul Stanley; Vini Poncia	Paul Stanley	Unmasked	1980	
"Eat Your Heart Out"	Gene Simmons	Gene Simmons	Monster	2012	
"Escape from the Island"	Ace Frehley; Eric Carr; Bob Ezrin	none (instrumental)	Music from "The Elder"	1981	
"Every Time I Look at You" †	Paul Stanley; Bob Ezrin	Paul Stanley	Revenge	1992	
"Exciter"	Paul Stanley; Vinnie Vincent	Paul Stanley	Lick It Up	1983	
"Fanfare"	Paul Stanley; Bob Ezrin	none (instrumental)	Music from "The Elder"	1981	
"Firehouse"	Paul Stanley	Paul Stanley	Kiss	1974	
"Fits Like a Glove"	Gene Simmons	Gene Simmons	Lick It Up	1983	
"Flaming Youth" †	Ace Frehley; Paul Stanley; Gene Simmons; Bob Ezrin	Paul Stanley	Destroyer	1976	
"Forever" †	Paul Stanley; Michael Bolton	Paul Stanley	Hot in the Shade	1989	
"Freak"	Paul Stanley; Tommy Thayer	Paul Stanley	Monster	2012	
"Get All You Can Take"	Paul Stanley; Mitch Weissman	Paul Stanley	Animalize	1984	
"Getaway"	Ace Frehley	Peter Criss	Dressed to Kill	1975	
"Gimme More"	Paul Stanley; Vinnie Vincent	Paul Stanley	Lick It Up	1983	
"God Gave Rock 'n' Roll to You II" † (Argent cover)	Russ Ballard; Paul Stanley; Gene Simmons; Bob Ezrin	Paul Stanley; Gene Simmons	Revenge	1992	
"God of Thunder"	Paul Stanley	Gene Simmons	Destroyer	1976	
"Goin' Blind"	Gene Simmons; Stephen Coronel	Gene Simmons	Hotter than Hell	1974	
"Good Girl Gone Bad"	Gene Simmons; Davitt Sigerson; Peter Diggins	Gene Simmons	Crazy Nights	1987	
"Got Love for Sale"	Gene Simmons	Gene Simmons	Love Gun	1977	
"Got to Choose"	Paul Stanley	Paul Stanley	Hotter than Hell	1974	
"Great Expectations"	Gene Simmons; Bob Ezrin	Gene Simmons	Destroyer	1976	
"Hard Luck Woman" †	Paul Stanley	Peter Criss	Rock and Roll Over	1976	
"Hard Times"	Ace Frehley	Ace Frehley	Dynasty	1979	
"Hate"	Gene Simmons; Bruce Kulick; Scott van Zen	Gene Simmons	Carnival of Souls: The Final Sessions	1997	
"Heart of Chrome"	Paul Stanley; Vinnie Vincent; Bob Ezrin	Paul Stanley	Revenge	1992	
"Heaven's on Fire" †	Paul Stanley; Desmond Child	Paul Stanley	Animalize	1984	
"Hell or Hallelujah"	Paul Stanley	Paul Stanley	Monster	2012	
"Hell or High Water"	Gene Simmons; Bruce Kulick	Gene Simmons	Crazy Nights	1987	
"Hide Your Heart" †	Paul Stanley; Desmond Child; Holly Knight	Paul Stanley	Hot in the Shade	1989	
"Hooligan"	Peter Criss; Stan Penridge	Peter Criss	Love Gun	1977	
"Hot and Cold"	Gene Simmons	Gene Simmons	Sonic Boom	2009	
"Hotter than Hell"	Paul Stanley	Paul Stanley	Hotter than Hell	1974	
"I" †	Gene Simmons; Bob Ezrin	Paul Stanley; Gene Simmons	Music from "The Elder"	1981	
"I Confess"	Gene Simmons; Ken Tamplin	Gene Simmons	Carnival of Souls: The Final Sessions	1997	
"I Finally Found My Way" †	Paul Stanley; Bob Ezrin	Peter Criss	Psycho Circus	1998	
"I Just Wanna" †	Paul Stanley; Vinnie Vincent	Paul Stanley	Revenge	1992	
"I Know Who You Are"	Gene Simmons	Gene Simmons	Love Gun (deluxe edition reissue only)	2014	
"I Love It Loud" †	Gene Simmons; Vinnie Vincent	Gene Simmons	Creatures of the Night	1982	
"I Pledge Allegiance to the State of Rock & Roll"	Paul Stanley; Curtis Cuomo; Holly Knight	Paul Stanley	Psycho Circus	1998	
"I Still Love You"	Paul Stanley; Vinnie Vincent	Paul Stanley	Creatures of the Night	1982	
"I Stole Your Love"	Paul Stanley	Paul Stanley	Love Gun	1977	
"I Walk Alone"	Gene Simmons; Bruce Kulick	Bruce Kulick	Carnival of Souls: The Final Sessions	1997	
"I Want You"	Paul Stanley	Paul Stanley	Rock and Roll Over	1976	
"I Was Made for Lovin' You" †	Paul Stanley; Vini Poncia; Desmond Child	Paul Stanley	Dynasty	1979	
"I Will Be There"	Paul Stanley; Bruce Kulick; Curtis Cuomo	Paul Stanley	Carnival of Souls: The Final Sessions	1997	
"I'll Fight Hell to Hold You"	Paul Stanley; Adam Mitchell; Bruce Kulick	Paul Stanley	Crazy Nights	1987	
"I'm a Legend Tonight"	Paul Stanley; Adam Mitchell	Paul Stanley	Killers	1982	
"I'm Alive"	Paul Stanley; Desmond Child; Bruce Kulick	Paul Stanley	Asylum	1985	
"I'm an Animal"	Paul Stanley; Gene Simmons; Tommy Thayer	Gene Simmons	Sonic Boom	2009	
"I've Had Enough (Into the Fire)"	Paul Stanley; Desmond Child	Paul Stanley	Animalize	1984	
"In My Head"	Gene Simmons; Scott van Zen; Jaime St. James	Gene Simmons	Carnival of Souls: The Final Sessions	1997	
"In the Mirror"	Paul Stanley; Bruce Kulick; Curtis Cuomo	Paul Stanley	Carnival of Souls: The Final Sessions	1997	
"In Your Face"	Gene Simmons	Ace Frehley	Psycho Circus (Japanese edition only)	1998	
"Into the Void"	Ace Frehley; Karl Cochran	Ace Frehley	Psycho Circus	1998	
"Is That You?"	Gerard McMahon	Paul Stanley	Unmasked	1980	
"It Never Goes Away"	Paul Stanley; Bruce Kulick; Curtis Cuomo	Paul Stanley	Carnival of Souls: The Final Sessions	1997	
"It's My Life"	Paul Stanley; Gene Simmons	Gene Simmons	The Box Set	2001	
"Journey of 1,000 Years"	Gene Simmons	Gene Simmons	Psycho Circus	1998	
"Jungle" †	Paul Stanley; Bruce Kulick; Curtis Cuomo	Paul Stanley	Carnival of Souls: The Final Sessions	1997	
"Just a Boy"	Paul Stanley; Bob Ezrin	Paul Stanley	Music from "The Elder"	1981	
"Keep Me Comin'"	Paul Stanley; Adam Mitchell	Paul Stanley	Creatures of the Night	1982	
"Killer" †	Gene Simmons; Vinnie Vincent	Gene Simmons	Creatures of the Night	1982	
"King of Hearts"	Paul Stanley; Vini Poncia	Paul Stanley	Hot in the Shade	1989	
"King of the Mountain"	Paul Stanley; Desmond Child; Bruce Kulick	Paul Stanley	Asylum	1985	
"King of the Night Time World"	Paul Stanley; Kim Fowley; Mark Anthony; Bob Ezrin	Paul Stanley	Destroyer	1976	
"Kissin' Time" † (Bobby Rydell cover)	Kal Mann; Bernie Lowe	Gene Simmons; Paul Stanley; Peter Criss	Kiss	1974	
"Ladies in Waiting"	Gene Simmons	Gene Simmons	Dressed to Kill	1975	
"Ladies Room"	Gene Simmons	Gene Simmons	Rock and Roll Over	1976	
"Larger than Life"	Gene Simmons	Gene Simmons	Alive II	1977	
"Last Chance"	Paul Stanley; Gene Simmons; Tommy Thayer	Paul Stanley	Monster	2012	
"Leeta"	Gene Simmons	Gene Simmons	The Box Set	2001	
"Let Me Go, Rock 'n' Roll" †	Gene Simmons; Paul Stanley	Gene Simmons	Hotter than Hell	1974	
"Let Me Know"	Paul Stanley	Gene Simmons; Paul Stanley	Kiss	1974	
"Let's Put the X in Sex" †	Paul Stanley; Desmond Child	Paul Stanley	Smashes, Thrashes & Hits	1988	
"Lick It Up" †	Paul Stanley; Vinnie Vincent	Paul Stanley	Lick It Up	1983	
"Little Caesar"	Eric Carr; Gene Simmons; Adam Mitchell	Eric Carr	Hot in the Shade	1989	
"Lonely Is the Hunter"	Gene Simmons	Gene Simmons	Animalize	1984	
"Long Way Down"	Paul Stanley; Tommy Thayer	Paul Stanley	Monster	2012	
"Love 'Em and Leave 'Em"	Gene Simmons	Gene Simmons	Rock and Roll Over	1976	
"Love Gun" †	Paul Stanley	Paul Stanley	Love Gun	1977	
"Love Her All I Can"	Paul Stanley	Paul Stanley	Dressed to Kill	1975	
"Love Theme from Kiss"	Paul Stanley; Gene Simmons; Ace Frehley; Peter Criss	none (instrumental)	Kiss	1974	
"Love's a Deadly Weapon"	Paul Stanley; Gene Simmons; Rod Swenson; Wes Beech	Gene Simmons	Asylum	1985	
"Love's a Slap in the Face"	Gene Simmons; Vini Poncia	Gene Simmons	Hot in the Shade	1989	
"Mad Dog"	Gene Simmons	Gene Simmons	The Box Set	2001	
"Magic Touch"	Paul Stanley	Paul Stanley	Dynasty	1979	
"Mainline"	Paul Stanley	Peter Criss	Hotter than Hell	1974	
"Makin' Love"	Paul Stanley; Sean Delaney	Paul Stanley	Rock and Roll Over	1976	
"Master & Slave"	Paul Stanley; Bruce Kulick; Curtis Cuomo	Paul Stanley	Carnival of Souls: The Final Sessions	1997	
"A Million to One"	Paul Stanley; Vinnie Vincent	Paul Stanley	Lick It Up	1983	
"Modern Day Delilah" †	Paul Stanley	Paul Stanley	Sonic Boom	2009	
"Mr. Blackwell"	Gene Simmons; Lou Reed	Gene Simmons	Music from "The Elder"	1981	
"Mr. Speed"	Paul Stanley; Sean Delaney	Paul Stanley	Rock and Roll Over	1976	
"Much Too Soon"	Gene Simmons	Gene Simmons	Love Gun (deluxe edition reissue only)	2014	
"Murder in High-Heels"	Gene Simmons; Mitch Weissman	Gene Simmons	Animalize	1984	
"My Way"	Paul Stanley; Desmond Child; Bruce Turgon	Paul Stanley	Crazy Nights	1987	
"Naked City"	Gene Simmons; Vini Poncia; Bob Kulick; Pepe Castro	Gene Simmons	Unmasked	1980	
"Never Enough" †	Paul Stanley; Tommy Thayer	Paul Stanley	Sonic Boom	2009	
"No, No, No"	Gene Simmons; Bruce Kulick; Eric Carr	Gene Simmons	Crazy Nights	1987	
"Not for the Innocent"	Gene Simmons; Vinnie Vincent	Gene Simmons	Lick It Up	1983	
"Nothin' to Lose" †	Gene Simmons	Gene Simmons; Peter Criss	Kiss	1974	
"Nothing Can Keep Me from You"	Diane Warren	Paul Stanley	Detroit Rock City	1999	
"Nowhere to Run"	Paul Stanley	Paul Stanley	Killers	1982	
"The Oath" †	Paul Stanley; Bob Ezrin; Tony Powers	Paul Stanley	Music from "The Elder"	1981	
"Odyssey"	Tony Powers	Paul Stanley	Music from "The Elder"	1981	
"Only You"	Gene Simmons	Gene Simmons; Paul Stanley	Music from "The Elder"	1981	
"Outta This World"	Tommy Thayer	Tommy Thayer	Monster	2012	
"Paralyzed"	Gene Simmons; Bob Ezrin	Gene Simmons	Revenge	1992	
"Parasite"	Ace Frehley	Gene Simmons	Hotter than Hell	1974	
"Partners in Crime"	Paul Stanley; Adam Mitchell	Paul Stanley	Killers	1982	
"Plaster Caster"	Gene Simmons	Gene Simmons	Love Gun	1977	
"Prisoner of Love"	Gene Simmons; Bruce Kulick	Gene Simmons	Hot in the Shade	1989	
"Psycho Circus" †	Paul Stanley; Curtis Cuomo	Paul Stanley	Psycho Circus	1998	
"Radar for Love"	Paul Stanley; Desmond Child	Paul Stanley	Asylum	1985	
"Rain"	Paul Stanley; Bruce Kulick; Curtis Cuomo	Paul Stanley	Carnival of Souls: The Final Sessions	1997	
"Raise Your Glasses"	Paul Stanley; Holly Knight	Paul Stanley	Psycho Circus	1998	
"Read My Body"	Paul Stanley; Bob Halligan Jr.	Paul Stanley	Hot in the Shade	1989	
"Reason to Live" †	Paul Stanley; Desmond Child	Paul Stanley	Crazy Nights	1987	
"Reputation"	Gene Simmons	Gene Simmons	Love Gun (deluxe edition reissue only)	2014	
"Right Here Right Now"	Paul Stanley; Tommy Thayer	Paul Stanley	Monster (digital editions only)	2012	
"Rise to It" †	Paul Stanley; Bob Halligan Jr.	Paul Stanley	Hot in the Shade	1989	
"Rock and Roll All Nite" †	Gene Simmons; Paul Stanley	Gene Simmons	Dressed to Kill	1975	
"Rock and Roll Hell"	Gene Simmons; Bryan Adams; Jim Vallance	Gene Simmons	Creatures of the Night	1982	
"Rock and Roll Demons" (hidden track also known as "Rock and Roll Party")	Gene Simmons; Paul Stanley; Bob Ezrin	none (instrumental)	Destroyer	1976	
"Rock Bottom"	Paul Stanley; Ace Frehley	Paul Stanley	Dressed to Kill	1975	
"Rocket Ride" †	Ace Frehley; Sean Delaney	Ace Frehley	Alive II	1977	
"Rockin' in the U.S.A."	Gene Simmons	Gene Simmons	Alive II	1977	
"Room Service"	Paul Stanley	Paul Stanley	Dressed to Kill	1975	
"Russian Roulette"	Gene Simmons; Paul Stanley	Gene Simmons	Sonic Boom	2009	
"Saint and Sinner"	Gene Simmons; Mikel Japp	Gene Simmons	Creatures of the Night	1982	
"Samurai Son" (with Momoiro Clover Z)	Paul Stanley; Greg Collins	Paul Stanley	"Yume no Ukiyo ni Saite Mi na"	2015	
"Save Your Love"	Ace Frehley	Ace Frehley	Dynasty	1979	
"Say Yeah" †	Paul Stanley	Paul Stanley	Sonic Boom	2009	
"Secretly Cruel"	Gene Simmons	Gene Simmons	Asylum	1985	
"Seduction of the Innocent"	Gene Simmons; Scott van Zen	Gene Simmons	Carnival of Souls: The Final Sessions	1997	
"See You in Your Dreams"	Gene Simmons	Gene Simmons	Rock and Roll Over	1976	
"Shandi" †	Paul Stanley; Vini Poncia	Paul Stanley	Unmasked	1980	
"She"	Gene Simmons; Stephen Coronel	Gene Simmons; Paul Stanley	Dressed to Kill	1975	
"She's So European"	Gene Simmons; Vini Poncia	Gene Simmons	Unmasked	1980	
"Shock Me"	Ace Frehley	Ace Frehley	Love Gun	1977	
"Shout It Out Loud" †	Paul Stanley; Gene Simmons; Bob Ezrin	Paul Stanley; Gene Simmons	Destroyer	1976	
"Shout Mercy"	Paul Stanley; Tommy Thayer	Paul Stanley	Monster	2012	
"Silver Spoon"	Paul Stanley; Vini Poncia	Paul Stanley	Hot in the Shade	1989	
"Somewhere Between Heaven and Hell"	Gene Simmons; Vini Poncia	Gene Simmons	Hot in the Shade	1989	
"Spit"	Gene Simmons; Paul Stanley; Scott van Zen	Gene Simmons; Paul Stanley	Revenge	1992	
"Stand"	Paul Stanley; Gene Simmons	Paul Stanley; Gene Simmons	Sonic Boom	2009	
"Stop, Look to Listen"	Paul Stanley	Paul Stanley	The Box Set	2001	
"Strange Ways"	Ace Frehley	Peter Criss	Hotter than Hell	1974	
"The Street Giveth and the Street Taketh Away"	Gene Simmons; Tommy Thayer	Gene Simmons	Hot in the Shade	1989	
"Strutter" †	Paul Stanley; Gene Simmons	Paul Stanley	Kiss	1974	
"Sure Know Something" †	Paul Stanley; Vini Poncia	Paul Stanley	Dynasty	1979	
"Sweet Pain"	Gene Simmons	Gene Simmons	Destroyer	1976	
"Take It Off"	Paul Stanley; Bob Ezrin; Kane Roberts	Paul Stanley	Revenge	1992	
"Take Me"	Paul Stanley; Sean Delaney	Paul Stanley	Rock and Roll Over	1976	
"Take Me Down Below"	Gene Simmons; Paul Stanley; Tommy Thayer	Gene Simmons; Paul Stanley	Monster	2012	
"Talk to Me" †	Ace Frehley	Ace Frehley	Unmasked	1980	
"Tears Are Falling" †	Paul Stanley	Paul Stanley	Asylum	1985	
"Then She Kissed Me" (The Crystals cover)	Jeff Barry; Ellie Greenwich; Phil Spector	Paul Stanley	Love Gun	1977	
"Thief in the Night"	Gene Simmons; Mitch Weissman	Gene Simmons	Crazy Nights	1987	
"Thou Shalt Not"	Gene Simmons; Jesse Damon	Gene Simmons	Revenge	1992	
"Thrills in the Night" †	Paul Stanley; Jean Beauvoir	Paul Stanley	Animalize	1984	
"Time Traveler"	Paul Stanley; Desmond Child	Paul Stanley	The Box Set	2001	
"Tomorrow" †	Paul Stanley; Vini Poncia	Paul Stanley	Unmasked	1980	
"Tomorrow and Tonight"	Paul Stanley	Paul Stanley	Love Gun	1977	
"Torpedo Girl"	Ace Frehley; Vini Poncia	Ace Frehley	Unmasked	1980	
"Tough Love"	Paul Stanley; Bob Ezrin; Bruce Kulick	Paul Stanley	Revenge	1992	
"Trial by Fire"	Gene Simmons; Bruce Kulick	Gene Simmons	Asylum	1985	
"Turn On the Night" †	Paul Stanley; Diane Warren	Paul Stanley	Crazy Nights	1987	
"Two Sides of the Coin"	Ace Frehley	Ace Frehley	Unmasked	1980	
"Two Timer"	Gene Simmons	Gene Simmons	Dressed to Kill	1975	
"Uh! All Night"	Paul Stanley; Desmond Child; Jean Beauvoir	Paul Stanley	Asylum	1985	
"Under the Gun"	Paul Stanley; Desmond Child; Eric Carr	Paul Stanley	Animalize	1984	
"Under the Rose"	Gene Simmons; Eric Carr	Gene Simmons	Music from "The Elder"	1981	
"Unholy" †	Gene Simmons; Vinnie Vincent	Gene Simmons	Revenge	1992	
"Venus and Mars/Rock Show" (Wings cover)	Paul McCartney; Linda McCartney	Paul Stanley	The Art of McCartney	2014	
"Wall of Sound"	Paul Stanley; Gene Simmons; Tommy Thayer	Gene Simmons	Monster	2012	
"War Machine"	Gene Simmons; Bryan Adams; Jim Vallance	Gene Simmons	Creatures of the Night	1982	
"Watchin' You"	Gene Simmons	Gene Simmons	Hotter than Hell	1974	
"We Are One" †	Gene Simmons	Gene Simmons	Psycho Circus	1998	
"What Makes the World Go 'Round"	Paul Stanley; Vini Poncia	Paul Stanley	Unmasked	1980	
"When Lightning Strikes"	Tommy Thayer; Paul Stanley	Tommy Thayer	Sonic Boom	2009	
"When Your Walls Come Down"	Paul Stanley; Adam Mitchell; Bruce Kulick	Paul Stanley	Crazy Nights	1987	
"While the City Sleeps"	Gene Simmons; Mitch Weissman	Gene Simmons	Animalize	1984	
"Who Wants to Be Lonely"	Paul Stanley; Desmond Child; Jean Beauvoir	Paul Stanley	Asylum	1985	
"Within"	Gene Simmons	Gene Simmons	Psycho Circus	1998	
"A World Without Heroes" †	Paul Stanley; Gene Simmons; Bob Ezrin; Lou Reed	Gene Simmons	Music from "The Elder"	1981	
"X-Ray Eyes"	Gene Simmons	Gene Simmons	Dynasty	1979	
"Yes I Know (Nobody's Perfect)"	Gene Simmons	Gene Simmons	Sonic Boom	2009	
"You Love Me to Hate You"	Paul Stanley; Desmond Child	Paul Stanley	Hot in the Shade	1989	
"(You Make Me) Rock Hard" †	Paul Stanley; Desmond Child; Diane Warren	Paul Stanley	Smashes, Thrashes & Hits	1988	
"You Wanted the Best" †	Gene Simmons	Gene Simmons; Paul Stanley; Peter Criss; Ace Frehley	Psycho Circus	1998	
"You're All That I Want"	Gene Simmons; Vini Poncia	Gene Simmons	Unmasked	1980	
"Young and Wasted"	Gene Simmons; Vinnie Vincent	Gene Simmons	Lick It Up	1983	
"Yume no Ukiyo ni Saite Mi na" † (with Momoiro Clover Z)	Paul Stanley; Greg Collins; Yuho Iwasato	Momoiro Clover Z	"Yume no Ukiyo ni Saite Mi na"	2015	

== See also ==
- Kiss discography
