= Hot in the Shade Tour =

1990 concert tour by Kiss

- Tour by Kiss
- Tour program cover
- Associated album: Hot in the Shade
- Start date: March 11, 1990
- End date: November 9, 1990
- No. of shows: 123

Kiss concert chronology
- Crazy Nights World Tour (1987–1988); Hot in the Shade Tour (1990); Revenge Tour (1992)

The Hot in the Shade Tour was a concert tour by American rock band Kiss in support of their fifteenth studio album Hot in the Shade.

== Background ==
Following the Crazy Nights World Tour, Stanley had embarked on a solo club tour in 1989 while the band had gone on hiatus. The tour was set to begin earlier in the year, but was postponed to allow the second single from the album, "Forever", to be promoted as the first single, "Hide Your Heart" did not make as much impact. Prior to the beginning of the tour, the band spent two weeks in Lubbock, Texas to rehearse for the tour before setting out. Kiss headlined with their supporting acts Whitesnake in Toronto on June 15, 1990, playing alongside other opening acts Slaughter and Faster Pussycat.

On July 4, 1990, while on his way home after a performance in Springfield, Stanley ended up in a car accident and suffered minor neck and back injuries, which had forced the cancellation of the New Haven show on July 5, 1990, which was later rescheduled to October 27. He would later get injured again when he broke his ribs during a show in Johnstown, which resulted in a few shows getting canceled. This was the last tour to feature drummer Eric Carr, who later died of cancer on November 24, 1991. Carr performed his final show with Kiss on November 9, 1990 in New York City.

In the tour program for the band's final tour, Simmons reflected on the tour:

For the Hot in the Shade tour we went out on one of our most extravagant tours to date since the '70s makeup shows. We had lasers and a giant Sphinx prop on the stage, which was visually stunning and caught everybody's attention.

== Stage setup ==
The band used a 40-foot sunglasses-wearing sphynx from the album cover on their stage, naming it "Leon", which featured the ability to emit fireworks and lights from its mouth. At the beginning of every show, the mouth of the sphynx would open up to reveal the band in silhouette among the laser beams. When the band was performing "God of Thunder", the keyboardist Gary Corbett would sing the final verse through a synthesizer, to put it in sync with the mouth of the sphynx prop to make it look like it was singing. At the end of every performance, the sphynx would 'disappear', and through the use of cannon shots and sparks on stage and above the audience, the lighted band logo would roll up from the bottom of the stage during "I Want You".

The stage also included a ramp, which was draped in fog and fluid spewing tubing, as well as railed platforms on each side of the stage for Stanley and Kulick to throw guitar picks to the audience.

== Reception ==
Lonna Baldwin, a reporter from the Spokesman-Review who had attended the performance in Spokane on September 8, 1990, opened her review with the acknowledgement of the number of heavy metal fans that had turned out for the concert that night. She praised the usage of the band's entrance from the sphinx prop at the back of the stage, noting on the roar from the audience. She noted on the mixture of both new and old songs that the band performed during the show, also stating that the members knew how to put on a show. She concluded her review, stating that each song was enthusiastically received by the audience as well as the "standing throng in front of the stage".

Kim Reeves from the Southeast Missourian who attended the Cape Girardeau performance in May 22, 1990, had given the performance a positive review. She opened her review, noting on the lasting impressions of the sphynx on the stage and the pyrotechnical effects, noting on the roar of the crowd of 5,200 in attendance when the band had entered the stage. She stated that the band had evolved into a more mature group with the passage of time, citing the excitement from the crowd and the amount of energy from the band members from Stanley getting the audience to participate and Simmons jumping around on stage – also talking about the absence of the makeup, and the appearances of the band wearing spandex, and athletic style shoes.

Peter Atkinson, a staff writer from the Record-Journal, also gave a positive review following the band's New Haven performance. He noted on the usage of both the colossal stage set and both classic and new songs the band had performed during the show. Acknowledging the crowd's reactions to the show, he stated that the audience were well-behaved and surprisingly 'orderly' despite the band's energy on stage, adding when the encore had started - the security guards would scurry to safety behind the stage front barriers. He concluded his review, citing that the show was "a grand performance by the elder statesmen of metal".

== Set list ==
This is an example set list performed from a show, but may not represent the majority of shows during the tour.

1. "I Stole Your Love"
2. "Deuce"
3. "Heaven's on Fire"
4. "Crazy Crazy Nights"
5. "Black Diamond"
6. "Shout It Out Loud"
7. "Strutter"
8. "Calling Dr. Love"
9. "I Was Made for Lovin' You"
10. "Rise to It"
11. "Fits Like a Glove"
12. "Hide Your Heart"
13. "Lick It Up"
14. "God of Thunder"
15. "Forever"
16. "Cold Gin"
17. "Tears Are Falling"
18. "I Love It Loud"
19. "Love Gun"
20. "Detroit Rock City"

Encore

21. "I Want You"
22. "Rock and Roll All Nite"
- "Betrayed" was played twice on the tour, "Little Caesar" was played once on the tour and "Under the Gun" was played early on the tour, then was replaced by "I Was Made for Lovin' You".
- "C'mon and Love Me" and "Hell or High Water" were played at the beginning of the tour.

== Tour dates ==
List of 1990 concerts
Date	City	Country	Venue	Opening Act(s)
March 11, 1990	Galveston	United States	West Beach Pocket Park	Downtown Bruno
April 14, 1990	Asbury Park	United States	The Stone Pony	Saraya; The Good Rats; Joe Lynn Turner; The Red & The Black
April 25, 1990	Reseda	United States	Reseda Country Club	Shake City
May 4, 1990	Lubbock	United States	Lubbock Municipal Coliseum	Slaughter; Faster Pussycat
May 5, 1990	Dallas	United States	Coca-Cola Starplex Amphitheatre	Slaughter; Faster Pussycat
May 6, 1990	Austin	United States	Frank Erwin Center	Slaughter; Faster Pussycat
May 8, 1990	Tulsa	United States	Expo Square Pavilion	Slaughter; Faster Pussycat
May 9, 1990	Valley Center	United States	Britt Brown Arena	Slaughter; Faster Pussycat
May 10, 1990	Omaha	United States	Omaha Civic Auditorium	Slaughter; Faster Pussycat
May 11, 1990	Sioux Falls	United States	Sioux Falls Arena	Slaughter; Faster Pussycat
May 12, 1990	Bonner Springs	United States	Sandstone Amphitheatre	Slaughter; Faster Pussycat
May 15, 1990	Saginaw	United States	Wendler Arena	Slaughter; Faster Pussycat
May 17, 1990	Terre Haute	United States	Hulman Center	Slaughter; Faster Pussycat
May 18, 1990	Auburn Hills	United States	The Palace of Auburn Hills	Slaughter; Faster Pussycat
May 19, 1990	Toledo	United States	Toledo Sports Arena	Slaughter; Faster Pussycat
May 20, 1990	Fort Wayne	United States	Allen County War Memorial Coliseum	Slaughter; Faster Pussycat
May 22, 1990	Cape Girardeau	United States	Show Me Center	Slaughter; Faster Pussycat
May 23, 1990	Cedar Rapids	United States	Five Seasons Center	Slaughter; Faster Pussycat
May 25, 1990	Bloomington	United States	Met Center	Slaughter; Faster Pussycat
May 26, 1990	Fargo	United States	Red River Valley Speedway	Slaughter; Faster Pussycat
May 27, 1990	Duluth	United States	Duluth Arena	Slaughter; Faster Pussycat
May 28, 1990	Green Bay	United States	Brown County Veterans Memorial Arena	Slaughter; Faster Pussycat
May 30, 1990	Peoria	United States	Peoria Civic Center	Slaughter; Faster Pussycat
May 31, 1990	Evansville	United States	Mesker Amphitheatre	Slaughter; Faster Pussycat
June 1, 1990	St. Louis	United States	Kiel Auditorium	Slaughter; Faster Pussycat
June 2, 1990	Des Moines	United States	Iowa Veterans Memorial Auditorium	Slaughter; Faster Pussycat
June 3, 1990	Tinley Park	United States	New World Music Theatre	Slaughter; Faster Pussycat
June 6, 1990	Columbus	United States	Battelle Hall	Slaughter; Little Caesar
June 7, 1990	Trotwood	United States	Hara Arena	Slaughter; Little Caesar
June 8, 1990	Noblesville	United States	Deer Creek Music Center	Slaughter; Little Caesar
June 9, 1990	Richfield	United States	Richfield Coliseum	Slaughter; Little Caesar
June 12, 1990	Cincinnati	United States	Cincinnati Gardens	Slaughter; Little Caesar
June 13, 1990	Muskegon	United States	L. C. Walker Arena	Slaughter; Little Caesar
June 15, 1990	Toronto	Canada	CNE Grandstand^{1}	Whitesnake; Slaughter; Faster Pussycat
June 16, 1990	Weedsport	United States	Cayuga County Fair Speedway	Slaughter; Little Caesar
June 17, 1990	Middletown	United States	Orange County Fair Speedway	Slaughter; Little Caesar
June 20, 1990	Providence	United States	Providence Civic Center	Slaughter; Little Caesar
June 22, 1990	Binghamton	United States	Broome County Veterans Memorial Arena	Slaughter; Little Caesar
June 23, 1990	Burgettstown	United States	Coca-Cola Star Lake Amphitheater	Slaughter; Little Caesar
June 26, 1990	Philadelphia	United States	The Spectrum	Slaughter; Little Caesar
June 27, 1990	Allentown	United States	Great Allentown Fair	Slaughter; Little Caesar
June 28, 1990	Uniondale	United States	Nassau Veterans Memorial Coliseum	Slaughter; Little Caesar
June 29, 1990	Mansfield	United States	Great Woods Performing Arts Center	Slaughter; Little Caesar
June 30, 1990	East Rutherford	United States	Brendan Byrne Arena	Slaughter; Little Caesar
July 3, 1990	Springfield	United States	Springfield Civic Center	Slaughter; Little Caesar
July 6, 1990	Old Orchard Beach	United States	Seashore Performing Arts Center	Slaughter; Little Caesar
July 7, 1990	Albany	United States	Knickerbocker Arena	Slaughter; Little Caesar
July 8, 1990	Harrisburg	United States	City Island	Slaughter; Little Caesar
July 10, 1990	Fairfax	United States	Patriot Center	Slaughter; Danger Danger
July 11, 1990	Roanoke	United States	Roanoke Civic Center	Slaughter; Danger Danger
July 12, 1990	Richmond	United States	Richmond Coliseum	Slaughter; Danger Danger
July 13, 1990	Norfolk	United States	Norfolk Scope	Slaughter; Danger Danger
July 18, 1990	Johnson City	United States	Freedom Hall Civic Center	Slaughter; Danger Danger
July 19, 1990	Knoxville	United States	Knoxville Civic Coliseum	Slaughter; Danger Danger
July 20, 1990	Atlanta	United States	Coca-Cola Lakewood Amphitheatre	Slaughter; Danger Danger
July 21, 1990	Nashville	United States	Starwood Amphitheatre	Slaughter; Danger Danger
July 24, 1990	Columbia	United States	Carolina Coliseum	Slaughter; Danger Danger
July 25, 1990	Charlotte	United States	Charlotte Coliseum	Slaughter; Danger Danger
July 26, 1990	Greenville	United States	Greenville Memorial Auditorium	Slaughter; Danger Danger
July 27, 1990	Greensboro	United States	Greensboro Coliseum	Slaughter; Danger Danger
July 28, 1990	Fayetteville	United States	Cumberland County Memorial Arena	Slaughter; Danger Danger
August 1, 1990	Jacksonville	United States	Jacksonville Memorial Coliseum	Slaughter; Danger Danger
August 2, 1990	Orlando	United States	Orlando Arena	Slaughter; Danger Danger
August 3, 1990	Miami	United States	Miami Arena	Slaughter; Danger Danger
August 4, 1990	Tampa	United States	USF Sun Dome	Slaughter; Danger Danger
August 7, 1990	Pelham	United States	Oak Mountain Amphitheatre	Slaughter; Danger Danger
August 8, 1990	Memphis	United States	Mid-South Coliseum	Slaughter; Danger Danger
August 16, 1990	Huntsville	United States	Von Braun Civic Center	Slaughter; Winger
August 17, 1990	Jackson	United States	Mississippi Coliseum	Slaughter; Winger
August 18, 1990	Shreveport	United States	Hirsch Memorial Coliseum	Slaughter; Winger
August 19, 1990	Biloxi	United States	Mississippi Coast Coliseum	Slaughter; Winger
August 21, 1990	Houston	United States	The Summit	Slaughter; Winger
August 22, 1990	San Antonio	United States	Freeman Coliseum	Slaughter; Winger
August 24, 1990	Little Rock	United States	Barton Coliseum	Slaughter; Winger
August 25, 1990	Oklahoma City	United States	Myriad Convention Center	Slaughter; Winger
August 26, 1990	Salina	United States	Bicentennial Center^{2}	Slaughter; Winger
August 28, 1990	Rapid City	United States	Rushmore Plaza Civic Center	Slaughter; Winger
August 29, 1990	Billings	United States	MetraPark Arena	Slaughter; Winger
August 31, 1990	Morrison	United States	Red Rocks Amphitheatre	Slaughter; Winger
September 1, 1990	Salt Lake City	United States	Salt Palace	Slaughter; Winger
September 3, 1990	Boise	United States	BSU Pavilion	Slaughter; Winger
September 6, 1990	Vancouver	Canada	Pacific Coliseum	Slaughter; Winger
September 7, 1990	Seattle	United States	Seattle Center Coliseum	Slaughter; Winger
September 8, 1990	Spokane	United States	Spokane Coliseum	Slaughter; Winger
September 9, 1990	Portland	United States	Portland Memorial Coliseum	Slaughter; Winger
September 12, 1990	Sacramento	United States	Cal Expo Amphitheatre	Slaughter; Winger
September 13, 1990	Concord	United States	Concord Pavilion	Slaughter; Winger
September 14, 1990	Long Beach	United States	Long Beach Arena	Slaughter; Winger
September 15, 1990	San Diego	United States	San Diego Sports Arena	Slaughter; Winger
September 16, 1990	Phoenix	United States	Arizona Veterans Memorial Coliseum	Slaughter; Winger
September 19, 1990	El Paso	United States	El Paso County Coliseum	Winger; Vixen
September 20, 1990	Odessa	United States	Ector County Coliseum	Winger; Vixen
September 21, 1990	Fort Worth	United States	Tarrant County Convention Center	Winger; Vixen
September 22, 1990	Amarillo	United States	Amarillo Civic Center	Winger; Vixen
September 24, 1990	Springfield	United States	Hammons Student Center	Winger; Vixen
September 25, 1990	Columbia	United States	Hearnes Center	Winger; Vixen
September 26, 1990	Lincoln	United States	Pershing Auditorium	Winger; Vixen
September 28, 1990	Carbondale	United States	SIU Arena	Winger; Vixen
September 29, 1990	East Troy	United States	Alpine Valley Music Theatre	Slaughter; Winger
September 30, 1990	Dubuque	United States	Five Flags Center	Slaughter; Winger
October 2, 1990	Bismarck	United States	Bismarck Civic Center	Slaughter; Winger
October 4, 1990	Marquette	United States	Lakeview Arena	Slaughter; Winger
October 5, 1990	Rochester	United States	Mayo Civic Center	Slaughter; Winger
October 6, 1990	Topeka	United States	Landon Arena	Slaughter; Winger
October 7, 1990	Sioux City	United States	Sioux City Municipal Auditorium	Slaughter; Winger
October 10, 1990	Johnstown	United States	Cambria County War Memorial Arena^{3}	Slaughter; Winger
October 12, 1990	Hamilton	Canada	Copps Coliseum	Slaughter; Winger
October 13, 1990	London	Canada	London Gardens	Slaughter; Winger
October 14, 1990	Auburn Hills	United States	The Palace of Auburn Hills	Slaughter; Winger
October 15, 1990	Kalamazoo	United States	Wings Stadium	Slaughter; Winger
October 16, 1990	Erie	United States	Erie Civic Center	Slaughter; Winger
October 18, 1990	Ottawa	Canada	Ottawa Civic Centre	Slaughter; Winger
October 19, 1990	Montreal	Canada	Montreal Forum	Slaughter; Winger
October 25, 1990	Portland	United States	Cumberland County Civic Center	Slaughter; Winger
October 26, 1990	Worcester	United States	Centrum in Worcester	Slaughter; Winger
October 27, 1990	New Haven	United States	New Haven Coliseum	Slaughter; Winger
November 1, 1990	Charleston	United States	Charleston Civic Center	Slaughter; Winger
November 2, 1990	Augusta	United States	Augusta-Richmond County Civic Center	Slaughter; Winger
November 3, 1990	Albany	United States	Albany Civic Center	Slaughter; Winger
November 6, 1990	Columbus	United States	Columbus Municipal Auditorium	Slaughter; Winger
November 7, 1990	Asheville	United States	Asheville Civic Center	Slaughter; Winger
November 8, 1990	Hershey	United States	Hersheypark Arena	Slaughter; Winger
November 9, 1990	New York City	United States	Madison Square Garden^{4}	Slaughter; Winger

- ^Note 1Kiss was the supporting act for Whitesnake at this show.
- ^Note 2During this show, the enormous stage set overloaded the arena's power supply, causing a transformer to explode outside the building, cutting electricity inside the arena and abruptly ending the show.
- ^Note 3At this show, Stanley ran into the guardrail on stage and cracked his ribs, causing some shows to be canceled.
- ^Note 4Eric Carr's last show.

=== Cancelled dates ===
Date	City	Country	Venue	Reason
June 21, 1990	Rochester	United States	Rochester Community War Memorial	No reason given
July 5, 1990	New Haven	United States	New Haven Coliseum	Injuries suffered to Paul Stanley
July 14, 1990	Charleston	United States	Charleston Civic Center	Injuries suffered to Paul Stanley
July 15, 1990	Lexington	United States	Rupp Arena	Injuries suffered to Paul Stanley
July 31, 1990	Savannah	United States	Savannah Civic Center	No reason given
August 30, 1990	Casper	United States	Casper Events Center	Poor ticket sales
October 21, 1990	Sydney	Canada	Centre 200	Injuries suffered to Paul Stanley
October 22, 1990	Halifax	Canada	Halifax Metro Centre	Injuries suffered to Paul Stanley
October 23, 1990	Moncton	Canada	Moncton Coliseum	Injuries suffered to Paul Stanley
October 28, 1990	Baltimore	United States	Baltimore Arena	Injuries suffered to Paul Stanley
October 30, 1990	Wheeling	United States	Wheeling Civic Center	Kiss cancelled; Winger and Slaughter both performed extended sets with partial refunds given out
October 31, 1990	Lexington	United States	Rupp Arena	Injuries suffered to Paul Stanley

== Personnel ==
- Paul Stanley – vocals, rhythm guitar
- Gene Simmons – vocals, bass
- Eric Carr – drums, vocals
- Bruce Kulick – lead guitar, backing vocals

Additional musician

- Gary Corbett – keyboards
