= Little Caesar (song) =

Song by Kiss

from the album Hot in the Shade
- Released: October 17, 1989
- Recorded: July–August 1989
- Length: 3:08
- Label: Mercury Records
- Songwriters: Eric Carr, Gene Simmons, Adam Mitchell
- Producers: Paul Stanley & Gene Simmons

"Little Caesar" is a song by the American hard rock band Kiss, featured on their 1989 album Hot in the Shade. It is the lone original song that drummer Eric Carr sang lead on during his tenure with Kiss (although he did sing lead on a remake of "Beth" on Kiss's Smashes, Thrashes & Hits album the year before). The song was written by Carr, Gene Simmons and Adam Mitchell.

== Background ==
Carr submitted three songs to Kiss bassist Gene Simmons for selection for the then upcoming album, and according to Carr in 1990:

I brought three really, really good songs to Gene in April of 1989. There's a ballad I wrote called "Somebody's Waiting", which I did a complete demo for. Complete vocals and music and I even did a 24-track of that one. But "Forever" was a real super, super song and we didn't want to have two ballads on the album. I wrote another one called "Listen To the Eyes of Love", a kind of AC/DC thing that never got completely finished. And this other thing which was a kind of funkrock thing, and I stuck it on there as a joke."

Simmons actually loved the last song and suggested that Carr should make a complete demo of it. Carr and Kiss guitarist Bruce Kulick went to the studio and completed a full recording, assuming all instrumental duties; Simmons and rhythm guitarist Paul Stanley only provided backing vocals in the recording. The track was originally titled "Ain't That Peculiar" (a version that is featured on 2001's The Box Set) and featured lyrics from the Marvin Gaye song of the same name until Carr and Simmons wrote a new set of lyrics together using the title "Little Caesar", which is what Simmons called Carr when he was acting like a tough guy.

== Live performance ==
"Little Caesar" was played live once by Kiss on the first night of their Hot in the Shade Tour, on April 26, 1990, at the Country Club in Reseda.

== Reception ==
In Greg Prato's Allmusic review of Hot in the Shade, which he gave the album two out of a possible five stars, he stated that "Little Caesar" is one of the album's few bright spots".

== Personnel ==
- Eric Carr - Drums, bass, lead and backing vocals
- Bruce Kulick - Lead and rhythm guitars, backing vocals
- Paul Stanley - Backing vocals
- Gene Simmons - Backing vocals
