= Long Way Down (Kiss song) =

Single by Kiss

from the album Monster
- B-side: "All for the Love of Rock & Roll"
- Released: October 23, 2012
- Genre: Pop rock
- Label: Simstan Music Ltd. (Universal Music Group)
- Songwriter(s): Paul Stanley, Tommy Thayer
- Producer(s): Paul Stanley

Kiss singles chronology
"Hell or Hallelujah" (2012)	"Long Way Down" (2012)	"Yume no Ukiyo ni Saite Mi na" (2015)

"Long Way Down" is a song by the American rock band Kiss from their 2012 studio album Monster. The song was written by Paul Stanley and Tommy Thayer and produced by Paul Stanley. It was the album's second and final single.

It impacted radio on October 23, 2012.

== Composition and critical reception ==
The song can be classified as a "pop rocker".

Brett Weiss in his Encyclopedia of Kiss calls "Long Way Down" "one of several solid, but ultimately forgettable songs on Monster".

He also notes that the song is "one of many KISS songs in which the band (Paul Stanley in this case) mentions a girl (a gypsy in this case) bringing a guy to his knees".

Billy Dukes in his review at Ultimate Classic Rock describes "Long Way Down" as a "meaty rock song" and notes that "with a big, beefy guitar riff and in your face message" it "could fit on many albums from the band's past". It reminds him of "Out on the Tiles" by Led Zeppelin and "Buick Mackane" by T. Rex. He also adds that its "thin melody and screaming electro guitars" make it arguably "very Van Halen-esque". He concludes his review saying that with "Long Way Down" "Kiss reaffirms, rather than expands, their brand" and that the song is "more than sufficient in proving that as they approach 40 years together, they're still well-worth the ticket price", but still "it's not the hit that will convince those keeping them out of Rock and Roll Hall of Fame to change their vote".

== Commercial performance ==
The song reached number 25 on the Heritage Rock Chart in Billboard.

== Track listings ==
Promo digital single by Simstan Music Ltd. (Universal Music Group)

1. "Long Way Down" (3:51)
2. "All for the Love of Rock & Roll" (3:21)
