= Hell or Hallelujah =

Single by Kiss

from the album Monster
- Released: July 2, 2012
- Recorded: April 2011 – 2012
- Studio: Conway Recording Studios, Hollywood, California
- Genre: Hard Rock, Heavy Metal
- Length: 4:07
- Label: Universal
- Songwriter: Paul Stanley
- Producers: Paul Stanley; Greg Collins

Kiss singles chronology
"Never Enough" (2010)	"Hell or Hallelujah" (2012)	"Long Way Down" (2012)

Music video
- "Hell or Hallelujah" (lyric video) on YouTube

"Hell or Hallelujah" is a song by the American hard rock band Kiss on their 20th studio album Monster. It was released as the first single from the album, internationally on July 2, 2012 and in the US on July 3, 2012. The song, which is of autobiographical content, was performed for the first time in concert in London on July 4, 2012.

== Background ==
"Hell or Hallelujah" was one of the first songs from the Monster album to be officially mentioned by a member of the band, when during an interview with 95.5 KLOS Gene Simmons in April 2011 named it and "Wall of Sound" as one of the songs that are possible for inclusion on the album. However, the original title of the song was "Tell Her Hallelujah".

== Music video ==
Kiss released a lyric video to their YouTube channel on July 3, 2012. The video consists of a slideshow of the band's photos topped with the song's lyrics.

== Charts ==
Chart (2012)	Peak position
Rock (America's Music Charts)	6
Canada: Active Rock (America's Music Charts)	21
US Mainstream Rock (Billboard)	36

== Personnel ==
- Paul Stanley – rhythm guitar, lead vocals
- Gene Simmons – bass guitar, backing vocals
- Eric Singer – drums, backing vocals
- Tommy Thayer – lead guitar, backing vocals
