= Rise to It =

Single by Kiss

from the album Hot in the Shade
- Released: April 1, 1990 (US)
- Recorded: The Fortress, Hollywood, CA: 1989
- Genre: Glam metal
- Length: 4:08
- Label: Mercury 875-098-7 (US)
- Songwriters: Paul Stanley, Bob Halligan Jr.
- Producers: Gene Simmons, Paul Stanley

Kiss singles chronology
| "Forever" (1990) | "Rise to It" (1990) | "God Gave Rock 'n' Roll to You II" (1991) |

Music video
- "Rise to It" on YouTube

"Rise to It" is a song by American rock band Kiss, released in April 1990 by Mercury Records, as the third and final single from their 15th studio album, Hot in the Shade (1989). The song is written by Paul Stanley and Bob Halligan Jr., and produced by Gene Simmons and Paul Stanley. It peaked at numbers 79 and 81 on the US Cash Box Top 100 and Billboard Hot 100 charts, and number 40 on the Billboard Mainstream Rock Tracks chart. The accompanying music video was directed by Mark Rezyka. "Rise to It" is the final single by the band on which Eric Carr plays drums. He was diagnosed with terminal heart cancer following the supporting tour.

== Composition and lyrics ==
"Rise to It" is a glam metal song written by rhythm guitarist and vocalist Paul Stanley, and Bob Halligan Jr. Starting with an acoustic intro, which has been compared to Cinderella's "Bad Seamstress Blues", the lyrics explore the life of an unknown musician who claims that he will "rise to it".

== Release ==
The song was added to the setlist for the second show of the Hot in the Shade Tour and was performed until the end of the tour. The band dropped the song from the setlist of the Revenge Tour and never played it live again. The lowest charting single off the album, it reached No. 81 on the Billboard Hot 100, the last Kiss song to do so, and No. 40 on the Mainstream Rock Tracks.

== Music video ==
The music video for "Rise to It", directed by Canadian director Mark Rezyka, features Stanley and Simmons in their iconic makeup personas for the first time since the Creatures of the Night tour in 1982. The video's intro and epilogue scenes are stated as taking place at the band's dressing room in 1975. While putting their makeup on, Stanley and Simmons debate about performing without it. The epilogue has the band preparing for their show, where Stanley states no matter what changes, they will still be Kiss.

The costumes used in these scenes are historically inaccurate; Simmons' costume is from Unmasked (1980), while Stanley's is from Love Gun (1977). In addition, Peter Criss and Ace Frehley are substituted with body doubles Eric Carr and Bruce Kulick (who was wearing Vinnie Vincent’s “Ankh Warrior” costume).

== Personnel ==
- Paul Stanley – lead vocals, rhythm guitar
- Gene Simmons – bass, backing vocals
- Eric Carr – drums, backing vocals
- Bruce Kulick – lead guitar, backing vocals

== Charts ==
| Chart (1990) | Peak position |
|---|---|
| Australia (ARIA) | 144 |
| US Billboard Hot 100 | 81 |
| US Mainstream Rock Airplay (Billboard) | 40 |
| US Cash Box Top 100 | 79 |
