= Adam Mitchell (songwriter) =

Scottish songwriter

- Born: 24 November 1944 (age 81); Glasgow, Scotland
- Occupations: Songwriter, composer
- Years active: 1966–present

Adam Mitchell (born 24 November 1944) is a Scottish songwriter, most notable for writing "French Waltz", which was a hit for Nicolette Larson; "Dancing Round and Round", which was a hit for Olivia Newton-John; and for his later co-writing work with Kiss on the albums Killers, Creatures of the Night, Crazy Nights, and Hot in the Shade.

== History ==
Adam Mitchell was born in Glasgow in 1944, but moved with his family to Toronto, Canada, at the age of 12. At one point, he was a resident of Bolton, Ontario, a community northwest of the city. He commenced his career in music in the mid-1960s, first as a folk singer in Toronto's Yorkville district, and later as a member of The Paupers, a Toronto-based band that was managed by Albert Grossman, and which Mitchell joined in 1966. Mitchell's singing and songwriting were featured on the two albums released by the group. The group, while not internationally successful, was nonetheless notable for having performed in 1967 at the Monterey International Pop Festival.

Following the break-up of The Paupers in 1968, Mitchell moved into music production, producing albums by Canadian bands McKenna Mendelson Mainline and Fludd.

In 1979, Mitchell released a solo album, Redhead in Trouble, on Warner Bros. Records. "Fool For Love" was released as a single. The album also contained two of Mitchell's songs which were popularized by others: "French Waltz", by Nicolette Larson; and "Dancin' Round and Round", by Olivia Newton-John. Larson featured "French Waltz" on her debut album Nicolette, released in 1978. The song was first covered by Jane Olivor on her 1977 album "Chasing Rainbows." The song was also covered by Doug Kershaw, Art Garfunkel and Anne Murray.

Olivia Newton-John included "Dancin' Round and Round" on her 1978 album Totally Hot. The song has been described as "a wonderful country/pop tune." Newton-John released "Dancin' Round and Round" to the country music charts, where it peaked at No. 29 on the Billboard Country Singles chart. In addition, the album became a country music hit, reaching No. 4 on the Billboard Country Albums chart. The song was also covered by Nicolette Larson.

Mitchell also wrote the popular country song "Out Among The Stars", that was covered by Johnny Cash, Merle Haggard and Waylon Jennings, among others. The song was the title track to Haggard's 1987 album and Cash's posthumous 2014 album.

Through being introduced to the band by producer Michael James Jackson, Mitchell later became a co-writer of songs with various members of Kiss, including the title songs to the Creatures of the Night (1982) and Crazy Nights (1987) albums. With Paul Stanley, Mitchell co-wrote three of the nine songs on Creatures of the Night, including the title track. On Crazy Nights, in addition to writing the title track with Paul Stanley, Mitchell co-wrote, with Paul Stanley and Bruce Kulick, two other songs included on the album. With Gene Simmons and Eric Carr, Mitchell co-wrote "Dial 'L' for Love", a song that went unreleased from the Crazy Nights sessions but was eventually released on Carr's posthumous album Unfinished Business. In addition, a song that Mitchell had originally written in 1981 was rewritten with Gene Simmons during the Crazy Nights sessions as "Are You Always This Hot", but remains unreleased. The last Kiss song that Mitchell contributed to was Carr's "Little Caesar" from the Hot in the Shade album (1989).

Mitchell has also written songs recorded by John Waite, Wendy O. Williams, Bonnie Tyler, Chicago, Johnny Lee, Lynn Anderson, Commander Cody and Paul Anka, among others.

In recent years, Mitchell has devoted much time to teaching others the art of songwriting.
