= Yume no Ukiyo ni Saite Mi na =

Single by Momoiro Clover Z vs. Kiss

from the album Hakkin no Yoake
- A-side: "Yume no Ukiyo ni Saite Mi na"
- B-side: "Rock and Roll All Nite"; "Samurai Son" (incl. on Kiss Ed. only)
- Released: January 28, 2015
- Genre: J-pop, rock
- Length: 4:42
- Label: King Records
- Composers: Paul Stanley; Greg Collins
- Lyricists: Yuho Iwasato; Paul Stanley

Momoiro Clover Z singles chronology
"Moon Pride" (2014)	"Yume no Ukiyo ni Saite Mi na" (2015)	"Seishunfu" (2015)

Kiss singles chronology
"Long Way Down" (2012)	"Yume no Ukiyo ni Saite Mi na" (2015)

Music video
- "Yume no Ukiyo ni Saite Mi na" on YouTube

"Yume no Ukiyo ni Saite Mi na" (夢の浮世に咲いてみな; Try to Bloom in a Dream about the Floating World) is a single by the Japanese idol group Momoiro Clover Z and American rock band Kiss, credited to "Momoiro Clover Z vs. Kiss". It was released physically in Japan on January 28, 2015. The single marks the final release of new material from Kiss; they disbanded in 2023.

== Background ==
Part of the title is Ukiyo-e which refers to the "Floating World"–style of Japanese classical art.

Before the collaboration, the members of Kiss watched the concert videos of Momoiro Clover Z. Later, Paul Stanley gave his impressions in an interview:

Spectacular show! Great choreography! Music like we never heard before. We said, "this is something we can do!" Somebody said, "Kiss, why are you doing it?" "Because we can!" It's two worlds getting together, doing something unbelievable. Music power rocks the world.

The guitar solo on the single's B-side, a cover of "Rock and Roll All Nite", was performed by Shinji Wajima of Ningen Isu.

The KISS Edition of the single includes an English version of "Yume no Ukiyo ni Saite Mi na", titled "Samurai Son". "Samurai Son" was as well included on the Japanese-only Kiss compilation Best of Kiss 40.

== Music video ==
The music video features live action and animated footage of both bands. Momoiro Clover Z are dressed as female ninjas who travel in a floating world. There, they encounter Kiss, who empower them with black samurai armor. The video ends with Kanako Momota and Paul Stanley shaking hands.

The animated characters (the members of both bands) were designed by Japanese animator Sushio of Studio Trigger, and the animated part has a Kill la Kill feel to it. Sushio had collaborated with Momoiro Clover previously, working on the designs of their costumes for "Otome Sensō".

== Commercial performance ==
A commercial success, the single peaked at number one on Japan's Oricon daily singles chart, and at number two on its weekly singles chart.

== Track listing ==
=== Momoclo Edition (CD+Blu-ray) ===
CD
No.	Title	Length
1.	"Yume no Ukiyo ni Saite Mi na" (夢の浮世に咲いてみな)
2.	"Rock and Roll All Nite"

Blu-ray Disc
No.	Title	Length
1.	"Yume no Ukiyo ni Saite Mi na" (music video)

=== KISS Edition (CD only) ===
CD
No.	Title	Length
1.	"Yume no Ukiyo ni Saite Mi na"
2.	"Rock and Roll All Nite"
3.	"SAMURAI SON" (Momoiro Clover Z is responsible for the chorus)

== Charts ==
Chart (2015)	Peak position
Japan (Oricon Weekly Singles Chart)	2
