= Monster (Kiss album) =

Studio album by Kiss
- Released: October 9, 2012
- Recorded: April 13, 2011 – January 6, 2012
- Studios: Conway, Hollywood, California; The Nook, Studio City, California
- Genres: Hard rock, heavy metal
- Length: 43:39
- Label: UMe
- Producer: Paul Stanley

Kiss chronology
Kiss Sonic Boom over Europe (2010)	Monster (2012)	Kiss 40 (2014)

Singles from Monster
- 1. "Hell or Hallelujah" Released: July 3, 2012; 2. "Long Way Down" Released: October 23, 2012

Professional ratings
Aggregate scores
Source	Rating
AnyDecentMusic?	5.2/10
Metacritic	67/100
Review scores
Source	Rating
AllMusic	3/5 stars
The A.V. Club	B−
Brave Words & Bloody Knuckles	8.5/10
Consequence of Sound	2.5/5 stars
The Guardian	3/5 stars
Los Angeles Times	3/5 stars
Montreal Gazette	3.5/5 stars
Rolling Stone	3/5 stars
Sputnikmusic	2/5
Washington Times	3/5 stars

Monster is the twentieth and final studio album by the American rock band Kiss, released on October 9, 2012. It was recorded at Conway Recording Studios in Hollywood, California and at The Nook in Studio City. As with 2009's Sonic Boom, Monster was produced by Paul Stanley and Greg Collins, and featured the lineup of Stanley, Gene Simmons (vocals/bass), Eric Singer (drums/vocals), and Tommy Thayer (guitar/vocals).

== Background ==
Gene Simmons first mentioned Kiss' intention to record a follow-up to Sonic Boom in 2010. On March 10, 2011, Simmons said in a radio interview for Heavy Metal Thunder that the band would enter the studio in three weeks and that they had around 20 to 25 songs ready to record.

In an interview with Elliot Segal on Elliot in the Morning, May 2, 2011, Simmons mentioned that Kiss had recorded around five songs. The album was originally supposed to contain ten songs, but he revealed before the American Music Awards of 2011 that Monster will contain fifteen brand new songs, all studio written by the band. This was then reduced to thirteen songs.

On August 21, 2011, Kiss officially revealed the album's title and confirmed that it was being recorded in Los Angeles, with Paul Stanley producing, for a 2012 release.

The band uploaded a video on January 3, 2012, on YouTube in which Stanley commented that the album was two to three days from completion. The recording process ended three days later. The following day, Stanley stated, "Listening to the tracks back to back is like sensory overload. Everyone who has heard any of it is completely blown away. Powerful, heavy, melodic and epic. It makes us very proud. You all will be too."

The album's first single, "Hell or Hallelujah", was released on July 2, 2012, internationally and July 3 in North America along with the Monster book. It received play on rock radio and climbed onto the middle reaches of the Billboard Mainstream Rock Chart. The second single, "Long Way Down", was released to radio stations on October 23. While it failed to make the Billboard Mainstream Rock Chart, it did reach the Billboard Heritage Rock Charts by the end of the year, and also occupied a spot on America's Music Rock Chart for several months.

After several release delays, Monster was released in the U.S. on October 9, 2012.

== Composition ==
According to an interview with Tommy Thayer, the band had the intention of creating an album with a slightly heavier sound than Sonic Boom, as well as recreating the vibe that existed on the band's earlier material. Similarly, Simmons has likened the album to a combination of three of the band's previous albums, Destroyer, Revenge and Sonic Boom.

While doing interviews for his appearance in ABC's Castle, Simmons commented on the album's sound: "Meat and potatoes. You know it's going to be like Santa Claus. Up and down, everybody gets used to this and that, and things change, and fashion changes, but it's good to know that Santa comes, and he's not going to change his outfit and you know what you're going to get: gifts. Consistency of message."

The band also decided to use old analog equipment instead of more popular digital recording gear. In justifying Kiss' choice, Simmons commented: "Technology is a seductive bitch, she will seduce you. You press this button, you don't have to do anything. But analog is the love of your life. You can push real hard and it always gives back. For the new album, the actual recording process was 24-track tape and an old Trident board. And as many tubes as possible. You need tubes, electricity and thick wood to make that thick sound."

On March 22, 2012, Stanley said in an interview with VH1 Radio Network's Dave Basner, "Monster is really the culmination of everything this band has been in the past and where we're going. When we did Sonic Boom, it was a big task for us because we were saying, 'How do we define who we are today without losing who we've been?' So, that was a tall order for us, but once we got that under our belts, we wanted to go back in and Monster is far, far beyond anything we've done in terms of Sonic Boom and yet it's right up there with some of the best stuff we've done. It's KISS."

Monster debuted at No. 3 on the Billboard 200, making it the band's third consecutive album to reach the top three in the US, and cracked the Top 10 charts in Canada, Czech Republic, Norway, Sweden, Australia, Germany, Austria, Switzerland, Italy, Finland, Japan, and Danish charts and cracked the Top 20 in Spain, Hungary and the Dutch charts.

The album sold approximately 60,000 copies in its first week of release in the United States and 120,000 copies outside of the domestic US in its first week.

== Track listing ==
No.	Title	Writer(s)	Lead Vocals	Length
1.	"Hell or Hallelujah"	Paul Stanley	Stanley	4:07
2.	"Wall of Sound"	Stanley, Gene Simmons, Tommy Thayer	Simmons	2:55
3.	"Freak"	Stanley, Thayer	Stanley	3:35
4.	"Back to the Stone Age"	Simmons, Thayer, Stanley, Eric Singer	Simmons	3:01
5.	"Shout Mercy"	Stanley, Thayer	Stanley	4:04
6.	"Long Way Down"	Stanley, Thayer	Stanley	3:51
7.	"Eat Your Heart Out"	Simmons	Simmons	4:06
8.	"The Devil Is Me"	Simmons, Stanley, Thayer	Simmons	3:40
9.	"Outta This World"	Thayer	Thayer	4:29
10.	"All for the Love of Rock & Roll"	Stanley	Singer	3:21
11.	"Take Me Down Below"	Simmons, Stanley, Thayer	Simmons, Stanley	3:24
12.	"Last Chance"	Stanley, Simmons, Thayer	Stanley	3:05
Total length:				43:39

iTunes / Tour Edition Bonus Track
No.	Title	Writer(s)	Lead Vocals	Length
13.	"Right Here Right Now"	Stanley, Thayer	Stanley	3:58

Japanese Bonus Track
No.	Title	Writer(s)	Lead Vocals	Length
13.	"King of the Night Time World" (Live)	Stanley, Kim Fowley, Mark Anthony, Bob Ezrin	Stanley	3:59

== Personnel ==
Credits for Monster adapted from liner notes.

Kiss

- Paul Stanley – vocals, rhythm guitar, production
- Gene Simmons – vocals, bass
- Tommy Thayer – lead guitar, vocals
- Eric Singer – drums, vocals

Additional personnel

- Greg Collins – co-production, recording, mixing
- Brian Whelan – piano on "Freak"
- Tom Jermann – art direction, design
- Eric Weaver – assistant engineering
- Martin Cooke – assistant engineering
- Matt Wiggers – assistant engineering
- Seth Waldmann – assistant engineering
- Russell Lee – photography
- Brian Lowe – photography
- Rob Jacobs – product manager
- Ute Friesleben – production manager

== Charts ==
Chart (2012)	Peak position
Australian Albums (ARIA)	7
Austrian Albums (Ö3 Austria)	6
Belgian Albums (Ultratop Flanders)	37
Belgian Albums (Ultratop Wallonia)	36
Canadian Albums (Billboard)	3
Danish Albums (Hitlisten)	10
Dutch Albums (Album Top 100)	7
Finnish Albums (Suomen virallinen lista)	8
French Albums (SNEP)	26
German Albums (Offizielle Top 100)	6
Hungarian Albums (MAHASZ)	12
Irish Albums (IRMA)	87
Italian Albums (FIMI)	9
Japanese Albums (Oricon)	9
Mexican Albums (Top 100 Mexico)	26
Norwegian Albums (VG-lista)	2
Scottish Albums (Official Charts)	15
Spanish Albums (Promusicae)	11
Swedish Albums (Sverigetopplistan)	4
Swiss Albums (Schweizer Hitparade)	8
UK Albums (Official Charts)	21
UK Rock & Metal Albums (Official Charts)	3
US Billboard 200	3
US Digital Albums (Billboard)	1
US Top Hard Rock Albums (Billboard)	1
US Top Rock Albums (Billboard)	2
US Indie Store Album Sales (Billboard)	4
