= Hot in the Shade =

Studio album by Kiss
- Released: October 17, 1989
- Recorded: July–August 1989
- Studios: The Fortress, Hollywood, California
- Genres: Pop metal; hard rock
- Length: 58:39
- Label: Mercury
- Producers: Gene Simmons, Paul Stanley

Kiss chronology
Smashes, Thrashes & Hits (1988)	Hot in the Shade (1989)	Revenge (1992)

Singles from Hot in the Shade
- 1. "Hide Your Heart" Released: October 17, 1989; 2. "Forever" Released: January 5, 1990; 3. "Rise to It" Released: April 1, 1990

Hot in the Shade is the fifteenth studio album by American rock band Kiss, released in 1989. It is the first Kiss studio album since 1981's Music From "The Elder" to feature lead vocals from someone other than Paul Stanley or Gene Simmons, with drummer Eric Carr singing lead on "Little Caesar". It is also the final Kiss album in its entirety to feature Carr before his death in November 1991 during production of the band’s next album Revenge. Unlike its predecessor album, 1987's Crazy Nights, Hot in the Shade does not heavily feature keyboards.

The album includes the highest charting hit of the band's non-makeup era in the US, the power ballad "Forever", which was co-written by Paul Stanley and Michael Bolton. The single reached No. 8 on the Billboard Hot 100 in April 1990.

== Composition ==
Hot in the Shade contains 15 songs, the most of any Kiss studio album, and is one of the band's longest, with a running time of nearly an hour (58:39).

Future band member Tommy Thayer co-wrote two songs: "Betrayed" and "The Street Giveth and the Street Taketh Away".

== Recording ==
The album was recorded during the summer of 1989 at the Fortress in Hollywood. Aiming for a more stripped-down sound, Simmons and Stanley reportedly decided to record the album there after considering several different studios. To further give the album a more raw feel, along with being able to produce the album with a lower budget, the band elected to use the demos they recorded and polish them up via overdubs instead of re-recording the songs.

"Little Caesar" was Eric Carr's only lead vocal on an original song, although he previously sang lead on a re-recorded version of "Beth" for the compilation album Smashes, Thrashes & Hits.

== Artwork and packaging ==
The album liner notes thanked a dozen Kiss fan-published magazines that helped Kiss fans connect with the band and keep up to date with each member's activities. The liner notes concluded with a warning to fans about the HIV/AIDS epidemic, asking fans to use condoms to reduce the risk of catching and spreading it, adding, "AIDS is no party".

== Promotion ==
Three music videos were made for the promotion of the album.

The first was "Hide Your Heart", a concept video filmed on a rooftop in Los Angeles.

The second video, "Rise to It", shows Gene Simmons and Paul Stanley appearing in Kiss makeup for the first time since their 1983 unmasking, although the fictional scene with Simmons and Stanley in makeup was supposedly set in 1975. Both videos were held to be released in January and April 1990 to MTV.

The final video, "Forever," depicts the band in sepia tone monochrome, with yellow highlights from the sunlight. Even though "Rise to It" was shot and edited before "Forever", "Forever" was released as the second music video from the album to take advantage of the radio airplay the ballad was receiving. The "Forever" music video also reached No. 1 on Dial MTV and reached No. 47 on MTV's top 100 videos for 1990.

Of the 15 tracks on the album, only five were performed live. "Forever" was a pop hit and became a semi-regular part of the live setlist. "Hide Your Heart" was played in 2014 on the Kiss 40th Anniversary World Tour.

Forever was also played with the Melbourne Symphony Ensemble during the KISS Symphony concert in Melbourne, Australia in 2003.

== Reception ==
Professional ratings
Review scores
Source	Rating
AllMusic	2/5 stars
Collector's Guide to Heavy Metal	5/10
Encyclopedia of Popular Music	2/5 stars
Rock Hard	7.0/10
Rolling Stone	1/5 stars
The Rolling Stone Album Guide	2/5 stars

Hot in the Shade was certified Gold status on December 20, 1989, by the RIAA.

Its most successful single, "Forever", reached No. 8 on the Billboard charts, the band's highest-charting single in the US since "Beth" 13 years earlier.

Despite the top 10 success of "Forever", Hot in the Shade was the first Kiss album since 1982's Creatures of the Night not to be certified Platinum status.

== Track listing ==
Side One
No.	Title	Writer(s)	Lead vocals	Length
1.	"Rise to It"	Paul Stanley, Bob Halligan Jr.	Stanley	4:08
2.	"Betrayed"	Gene Simmons, Tommy Thayer	Simmons	3:38
3.	"Hide Your Heart"	Stanley, Desmond Child, Holly Knight	Stanley	4:25
4.	"Prisoner of Love"	Simmons, Bruce Kulick	Simmons	3:52
5.	"Read My Body"	Stanley, Halligan	Stanley	3:50
6.	"Love's a Slap in the Face"	Simmons, Vini Poncia	Simmons	4:04
7.	"Forever"	Stanley, Michael Bolton	Stanley	3:52
8.	"Silver Spoon"	Stanley, Poncia	Stanley	4:38

Side Two
No.	Title	Writer(s)	Lead vocals	Length
9.	"Cadillac Dreams"	Simmons, Poncia	Simmons	3:44
10.	"King of Hearts"	Stanley, Poncia	Stanley	4:26
11.	"The Street Giveth and the Street Taketh Away"	Simmons, Thayer	Simmons	3:34
12.	"You Love Me to Hate You"	Stanley, Child	Stanley	4:00
13.	"Somewhere Between Heaven and Hell"	Simmons, Poncia	Simmons	3:52
14.	"Little Caesar"	Eric Carr, Simmons, Adam Mitchell	Carr	3:12
15.	"Boomerang"	Simmons, Kulick	Simmons	3:30
Total length:				58:39

== Personnel ==
Kiss

- Paul Stanley – vocals, rhythm guitar, slide guitar on "Rise to It", acoustic guitar on "Forever", brass arrangements on "Cadillac Dreams", producer
- Gene Simmons – vocals, bass; rhythm guitar on "Cadillac Dreams", producer
- Eric Carr – drums, percussion, vocals, bass on "Little Caesar"
- Bruce Kulick – lead guitar, backing vocals, all guitars on "Little Caesar", bass and acoustic guitar solo on "Forever"

Additional musicians

- Phil Ashley – keyboards on "Hide Your Heart" and "Forever"
- The Sisters of No Mercy (Charlotte Crossley, Valerie Pinkston, Kim Edwards-Brown) – backing vocals on "Silver Spoon"
- Pat Regan – saxes on "Cadillac Dreams"
- All Star Cadillac Brass – end horns on "Cadillac Dreams"
- Kevin Valentine – drums on "King of Hearts" and "You Love Me to Hate You"
- Tommy Thayer – electroacoustic guitar on "Betrayed" and "The Street Giveth and the Street Taketh Away"

Production

- Pat Regan – engineer
- Mikey Davis – additional engineering
- Dave Wittman – mixing at the Cherokee Studios, Los Angeles
- Greg Fulginiti – mastering at Artisan Sound Recorders, Hollywood
- Michael Bays – art direction
- Mitchell Kanner – art direction, cover design
- Scott Townsend – cover design

== Charts ==
=== Weekly charts ===
Chart (1989–1990)	Peak position
Australian Albums (ARIA)	30
Canada Top Albums/CDs (RPM)	48
European Albums (Billboard)	84
German Albums (Offizielle Top 100)	46
Japanese Albums (Oricon)	48
Norwegian Albums (VG-lista)	8
Swedish Albums (Sverigetopplistan)	29
Swiss Albums (Schweizer Hitparade)	23
UK Albums (Official Charts)	35
US Billboard 200	29

=== Year-end charts ===
Chart (1990)	Position
US Billboard 200	90

== Certifications ==
Region	Certification	Certified units/sales
Canada (Music Canada)	Platinum	100,000^{^}
United States (RIAA)	Gold	500,000^{^}
^{^} Shipments figures based on certification alone.
