= Forever (Kiss song) =

Single by Kiss

from the album Hot in the Shade
- Released: January 5, 1990
- Recorded: 1989
- Studio: The Fortress, Hollywood, California, United States
- Genre: Hard rock
- Length: 3:52
- Label: Mercury (876 716)
- Songwriters: Paul Stanley, Michael Bolton
- Producers: Gene Simmons, Paul Stanley

Kiss singles chronology
"Hide Your Heart" (1989)	"Forever" (1990)	"Rise to It" (1990)

Music video
- "Forever" on YouTube

"Forever" is a power ballad by the American rock band Kiss, released in January 1990 by Mercury Records, as the second single from their fifteenth studio album, Hot in the Shade (1989). The song was co-written by Paul Stanley and Michael Bolton, and produced by Gene Simmons and Paul Stanley. It peaked at number eight on the US Billboard Hot 100 chart on April 21, 1990, making it the group's first US Top 40 single since "I Was Made for Lovin' You" reached number 11 in 1979. "Forever" was the band's ninth and, to date, last Top 40 American single. It also reached number eight on the US Cash Box Top 100 chart and number 17 on Billboard's Hot Mainstream Rock Tracks on March 17, 1990.

== Background ==
"Forever" begins with Stanley singing over an acoustic guitar intro, with the rest of the band joining during the first chorus.

The song was remixed at Electric Lady Recording Studios in New York, by Michael Barbiero and Steve Thompson for commercial release as a single. A music video was released to promote the song. It received heavy airplay on MTV, attaining the #1 position on the channel's "Dial MTV" show several times. The clip is perhaps the most understated video Kiss has released, as it shows the band playing the song in an empty room.

== Personnel ==
- Paul Stanley – lead vocals, acoustic guitar
- Bruce Kulick – electric guitar, bass, acoustic guitar solo, back up vocals
- Eric Carr – drums, percussion, back up vocals
- Phil Ashley – keyboards

== Charts ==
=== Weekly charts ===
Chart (1990–1991)	Peak position
Australia (ARIA)	73
Canada Top Singles (RPM)	18
UK Singles (Official Charts)	65
US Billboard Hot 100	8
US Mainstream Rock Airplay (Billboard)	17
US Cash Box Top 100	8

=== Year-end charts ===
Chart (1990)	Position
US Billboard Hot 100	92
