= Lick It Up World Tour =

1983–1984 concert tour by Kiss

- Tour by Kiss
- Poster to the concert in Munich, West Germany
- Associated album: Lick It Up
- Start date: October 11, 1983
- End date: March 17, 1984
- Legs: 2
- No. of shows: 94

Kiss concert chronology
- Creatures of the Night Tour/10th Anniversary Tour (1982–1983); Lick It Up World Tour (1983–1984); Animalize World Tour (1984–1985)

The Lick It Up World Tour was a concert tour by American hard rock band Kiss, in support of their eleventh studio album Lick It Up. It was the last tour to feature lead guitarist Vinnie Vincent.

== Background ==
It was the first tour the band performed without wearing their trademark make-up, following the reveal of the members without them on MTV in September 1983, basing it on how bands, fans and the times change. The tour began in Cascais, Portugal on October 11, 1983 when they performed for the first time without the usage of makeup. According to Simmons, fan reaction in Europe was 'greater than ever' and had sold out in advance. When asked if the removal of the makeup meant that it was a farewell tour, Simmons stated that it was not, saying "If that were the case, I'd rather let the thing fade away. We're only doing this because, after the tour and making Lick It Up, we feel stronger than ever."

The "tank" stage design from the preceding Creatures of the Night tour was used again, keeping all the same gimmicks. The January 11 show in Nashville was recorded, and an edited version aired on The King Biscuit Flower Hour. At the January 27 show in Long Beach, Kiss were presented with their first gold records since 1980 for the Lick It Up album.

Lead guitarist Vinnie Vincent was fired after the European Tour due to "unethical behavior". Kiss did not have enough time to search for another guitarist, so they re-hired Vincent for the North American leg until his firing became permanent after the tour ended. Bass guitarist Gene Simmons stated in various interviews that Vincent's dismissal was because he never signed his contract as an official member of Kiss and for unethical behavior. Stanley later admitted that Vincent had to go, stating that he was getting worse and stalling the shows with lengthy guitar solos. There were also issues regarding Vincent over his salary, who wanted a better deal and complained about the contract and working conditions, who eventually drove Stanley and Simmons to fire him when they accused him of trying to hijack the band.

In the tour program for the band's final tour, Simmons reflected on the tour:

The Lick It Up tour was a challenge, at least initially, as it was the first tour we did without makeup and I had to re-calibrate from being the fire-spewing Demon with eight-inch heels to a mere mortal playing rock and roll music. But Kiss are survivors. We survived in makeup and out of makeup; we survived all different kinds of music-thrash, disco, dance, grunge, new romance and we survive, persevere and thrive. It means we win! Kiss has always marched to the beat of their own drum.

== Reception ==
A local reporter who attended the Lakeland performance on December 29, 1983, opened their review by stating that before the removal of the make-up, it was easy to laugh at Kiss - referring to them as clowns that weren't amusing. However, they noted the positivity of the changes in the band's personnel and the band's hopes to retake the lead in the heavy metal industry. They praised the song "I Love It Loud", citing it as a song to capsulize the revitalized band's performance to 6,000 fans that night.

Chuck Gates, a reporter from the Deseret News, who had attended the Salt Palace performance on February 5, 1984, opened his review by stating that the band was 'mediocre then and still is'. He noted on the inclusion of songs from the band's album Lick It Up, but had inquired about the exclusion of the band's two hit songs "Beth" and "I Was Made for Lovin' You". Regarding the stage, he acknowledged the lack of theatrics and makeup, and the absence of both Ace Frehley and Peter Criss - to which he stated that all that was left was a mediocre heavy metal band playing at deafening volumes.

John Laycock from the Windsor Star who had attended the Cobo Arena show opened their review by stating that the band continued to roar without their makeup. He acknowledged the usage of Simmons' fire-breathing effects and the new wave haircuts that band members had. Even with the sight of no makeup, he reported the sturdiness of the band's songs during the performance, as well as noting on how the band's clothes had changed and not the music. He concluded his review, saying that the show remains a vividly staged break from sanity.

== Set lists ==
These are example set lists of what was performed during the tour on each leg, but may not represent the majority of the tour.

=== European set list ===
1. "Creatures of the Night"
2. "Detroit Rock City"
3. "Cold Gin"
4. "Fits Like a Glove"
5. "Firehouse"
6. "Exciter"
7. "War Machine"
8. "Gimme More"
9. "I Love It Loud"
10. "I Still Love You"
11. "Young and Wasted"
12. "Love Gun"
13. "Black Diamond"

Encore

14. "Lick It Up"
15. "Rock and Roll All Nite"

=== North American set list ===
1. "Creatures of the Night"
2. "Detroit Rock City"
3. "Cold Gin"
4. "Fits Like a Glove"
5. "Firehouse"
6. "Gimme More"
7. "War Machine"
8. "I Love It Loud"
9. "I Still Love You"
10. "Young and Wasted"
11. "Love Gun"
12. "All Hell's Breakin' Loose"
13. "Black Diamond"

Encore

14. "Lick It Up"
15. "Rock and Roll All Nite"

== Tour dates ==
Date	City	Country	Venue	Opening Act(s)
Europe
October 11, 1983	Cascais	Portugal	Pavilhão de Cascais	Helix
October 13, 1983	Madrid	Spain	Pabellón de Deportes del Real Madrid	Helix; Tigres de Oro
October 14, 1983	Madrid	Spain	Pabellón de Deportes del Real Madrid	Helix; Tigres de Oro
October 15, 1983	San Sebastián	Spain	Velódromo de Anoeta	Helix; Tigres de Oro
October 16, 1983	Barcelona	Spain	Palau dels Esports de Barcelona	Helix; Tigres de Oro
October 18, 1983	Toulouse	France	Palais des Sports de Toulouse	Helix
October 19, 1983	Clermont-Ferrand	France	Maison des Sports	Helix
October 21, 1983	Leeds	England	Queens Hall	Helix; Heavy Pettin'
October 22, 1983	Stafford	England	Bingley Hall	Helix; Heavy Pettin'
October 23, 1983	London	England	Wembley Arena	Helix; Heavy Pettin'
October 24, 1983	Leicester	England	De Montfort Hall	Helix; Heavy Pettin'
October 25, 1983	Poole	England	Poole Arts Center	Helix; Heavy Pettin'
October 27, 1983	Glasgow	Scotland	Glasgow Apollo	Helix; Heavy Pettin'
October 28, 1983	Edinburgh	Scotland	Edinburgh Playhouse	Helix; Heavy Pettin'
October 29, 1983	Newcastle-upon-Tyne	England	Newcastle City Hall	Helix; Heavy Pettin'
October 31, 1983	Paris	France	Espace Balard	Helix
November 1, 1983	Offenbach am Main	West Germany	Stadthalle Offenbach	Helix
November 2, 1983	Munich	West Germany	Löwenbräukeller	Helix
November 3, 1983	Basel	Switzerland	St. Jakobshalle	Helix
November 4, 1983	Sindelfingen	West Germany	Messehalle	Helix
November 6, 1983	Neunkirchen am Brand	West Germany	Hemmerleinhalle	Helix
November 7, 1983	Linz	Austria	Linzer Sporthalle	Helix
November 8, 1983	Vienna	Austria	Wiener Stadthalle	Helix
November 9, 1983	Graz	Austria	Eisstadion Liebenau	Helix
November 10, 1983	Essen	West Germany	Grugahalle	Helix
November 11, 1983	Kassel	West Germany	Eissporthalle Kassel	Helix
November 12, 1983	Lille	France	Palais de la Foire	Helix
November 13, 1983	Brussels	Belgium	Forest National	Helix
November 15, 1983	Lausanne	Switzerland	Halle des Fêtes de Beaulieu	Helix
November 17, 1983	Risskov	Denmark	Vejlby-Risskov Hallen	Helix
November 18, 1983	Gothenburg	Sweden	Scandinavium	Helix
November 19, 1983	Stockholm	Sweden	Johanneshovs Isstadion	Helix
November 20, 1983	Malmö	Sweden	Malmö Isstadion	Helix
November 21, 1983	Hillerød	Denmark	Frederiksborg Center	Helix
November 23, 1983	Helsinki	Finland	Helsinki Ice Hall	Helix
November 25, 1983	Oulu	Finland	Oulu-halli	Helix
North America
December 26, 1983	Atlanta	United States	The Omni Coliseum	Axe; Pat Travers Band
December 28, 1983	Augusta	United States	Augusta-Richmond County Civic Center	Axe
December 29, 1983	Lakeland	United States	Lakeland Civic Center	Axe; Pat Travers Band
December 30, 1983	Pembroke Pines	United States	Hollywood Sportatorium	Axe; Pat Travers Band
December 31, 1983	Jacksonville	United States	Jacksonville Memorial Coliseum	Axe; Pat Travers Band
January 1, 1984	Tallahassee	United States	Leon County Civic Center	Axe
January 6, 1984	Birmingham	United States	Boutwell Memorial Auditorium	Vandenberg; Riot
January 7, 1984	Memphis	United States	Mid-South Coliseum	Vandenberg; Riot
January 8, 1984	New Orleans	United States	Kiefer UNO Lakefront Arena	Vandenberg; Riot
January 9, 1984	Biloxi	United States	Mississippi Coast Coliseum	Vandenberg; Riot
January 10, 1984	Knoxville	United States	Knoxville Civic Coliseum	Vandenberg; Riot
January 11, 1984	Nashville	United States	Nashville Municipal Auditorium	Vandenberg; Riot
January 13, 1984	Dallas	United States	Dallas Convention Center	Vandenberg; Riot
January 14, 1984	San Antonio	United States	HemisFair Arena	Vandenberg; Riot
January 16, 1984	Austin	United States	Palmer Auditorium	Vandenberg; Riot
January 17, 1984	San Angelo	United States	San Angelo Coliseum	Vandenberg; Riot
January 18, 1984	Houston	United States	Sam Houston Coliseum	Vandenberg; Riot
January 19, 1984	Corpus Christi	United States	Corpus Christi Memorial Coliseum	Vandenberg; Riot
January 21, 1984	El Paso	United States	El Paso County Coliseum	Vandenberg; Riot
January 22, 1984	Albuquerque	United States	Tingley Coliseum	Vandenberg; Riot
January 23, 1984	Odessa	United States	Ector County Coliseum	Vandenberg; Riot
January 25, 1984	Denver	United States	University of Denver Arena	Vandenberg; Riot
January 27, 1984	Long Beach	United States	Long Beach Arena	Vandenberg; Riot
January 28, 1984	Las Vegas	United States	Thomas & Mack Center	Vandenberg; Riot
January 29, 1984	Fresno	United States	Selland Arena	Vandenberg; Riot
January 31, 1984	Reno	United States	Lawlor Events Center	Vandenberg; Riot
February 1, 1984	Berkeley	United States	Berkeley Community Theatre	Vandenberg; Riot
February 2, 1984	Bakersfield	United States	Bakersfield Civic Auditorium	Vandenberg; Riot
February 3, 1984	San Bernardino	United States	Orange Pavilion	Vandenberg; Riot
February 5, 1984	Salt Lake City	United States	Salt Palace	Vandenberg; Riot
February 8, 1984	Sioux City	United States	Sioux City Municipal Auditorium	Vandenberg; High Fever
February 9, 1984	Omaha	United States	Omaha Civic Auditorium	Vandenberg; Heaven
February 10, 1984	Milwaukee	United States	Milwaukee Auditorium	Vandenberg; Heaven
February 11, 1984	Dubuque	United States	Five Flags Center	Vandenberg; Heaven
February 12, 1984	Bloomington	United States	Met Center	Vandenberg; Heaven
February 14, 1984	Green Bay	United States	Brown County Veterans Memorial Arena	Vandenberg; Heaven
February 15, 1984	Chicago	United States	UIC Pavilion	Vandenberg; Heaven
February 16, 1984	Indianapolis	United States	Market Square Arena	Vandenberg; Heaven
February 17, 1984	Saginaw	United States	Wendler Arena	Vandenberg; Heaven
February 18, 1984	Detroit	United States	Cobo Arena	Vandenberg; Heaven
February 19, 1984	Columbus	United States	Battelle Hall	Vandenberg; Heaven
February 21, 1984	Trotwood	United States	Hara Arena	Vandenberg; Heaven
February 22, 1984	Richfield	United States	Richfield Coliseum	Vandenberg; Heaven
February 24, 1984	Worcester	United States	Centrum in Worcester	Accept
February 26, 1984	Hampton	United States	Hampton Coliseum	Accept
February 28, 1984	Baltimore	United States	Baltimore Civic Center	Accept
March 1, 1984	New Haven	United States	New Haven Coliseum	Accept
March 3, 1984	Upper Darby Township	United States	Tower Theater	Accept
March 4, 1984	Pittsburgh	United States	Stanley Theater	Accept
March 5, 1984	Erie	United States	Erie Civic Center	Accept
March 7, 1984	Binghamton	United States	Broome County Veterans Memorial Arena	Accept
March 8, 1984	Poughkeepsie	United States	Mid-Hudson Civic Center	Accept
March 9, 1984	New York City	United States	Radio City Music Hall	Accept
March 10, 1984	New York City	United States	Radio City Music Hall	Accept
March 12, 1984	Quebec City	Canada	Colisée de Québec	Accept
March 13, 1984	Montreal	Canada	Montreal Forum	Accept
March 15, 1984	Toronto	Canada	Maple Leaf Gardens	Accept
March 17, 1984	Evansville	United States	Roberts Municipal Stadium	Accept

== Personnel ==
- Paul Stanley – vocals, rhythm guitar
- Gene Simmons – vocals, bass
- Eric Carr – drums, vocals
- Vinnie Vincent – lead guitar, backing vocals
