= Unmasked Tour =

1980 concert tour by Kiss

- Tour by Kiss
- Official tour advertisement for Philipshalle, Düsseldorf, September 12, 1980
- Associated album: Unmasked
- Start date: July 25, 1980
- End date: December 3, 1980
- No. of shows: 42

Kiss concert chronology
- Dynasty Tour (1979); Unmasked Tour (1980); Creatures of the Night Tour (1982–1983)

The Unmasked Tour was a concert tour by the American hard rock band Kiss. It was the first tour not to feature original drummer Peter Criss, and the touring debut of his replacement Eric Carr.

== Background ==
The Unmasked Tour was the first time that Kiss only played in Europe, Australia, and New Zealand, with only one show played in the United States, at the Palladium Theatre in New York. "Cold Gin" returned to the set for the first time since the Rock & Roll Over Tour, and featured Ace Frehley on co-lead vocals, rather than solely Simmons, who had sung the song on all previous tours on which it was performed. "You're All That I Want" was performed briefly, but was quickly dropped. "Strutter", which had not been performed live since the Destroyer Tour, returned to the set as well. Iron Maiden were the opening act for the European leg of the tour. English heavy rock band Girl supported Kiss at Stafford, Bingley Hall. During an autograph session from the band while on tour in West Germany, more than 2,000 fans in Frankfurt ended up causing severe traffic jams. The West Germany concerts would bring in a total of 100,000 fans. The stage show and costumes, with the exception of Carr and Stanley, were holdovers from the Dynasty Tour.

This was the last tour that Ace Frehley performed with Kiss until the 1996 reunion tour.

In the tour program for the band's final tour, Stanley reflected on the tour:

Playing Australia in 1980 was amazing. We were big beyond any comprehension. When we were first told that we were huge in Australia I really didn't have any idea what that meant until we went there. When people were saying you're as big as The Beatles were that's kind of hard to comprehend until you get off a plane and there's thousands of people at an airport and there's thousands of people camping outside your hotel and we couldn't leave the hotels. "Shandi" had already been a hit there. We were the front headline of the papers for virtually three or four weeks. It reached the point where I was asking that we not have any more parties because literally every night the promoter threw a party for us.

== Reception ==
Roman Kozak, a reviewer from the magazine Billboard gave the performance a positive review. He opened his review, noting of the lineup changes with the introduction of the new drummer Eric Carr. Regarding the show, he acknowledged the performance as the typical Kiss show, but noted that the band were performing on a smaller stage than usual, with the performance being basically the same, with the inclusion of loud musical energy, special effects and lighting. He cited the change in the band's sound being more "melodic" and "pop-side", but still gave the fans the hard rock and heavy metal they wanted, taking note that the song "Talk to Me" was well-received by the audience.

== Tour dates ==
List of 1980 concerts
Date (1980)	City	Country	Venue	Opening acts
July 25	New York City	United States	The Palladium	The Rockats
August 29	Rome	Italy	Castel Sant'Angelo	Iron Maiden
August 31	Genova	Italy	Palasport di Genova	Iron Maiden
September 2	Milan	Italy	Velodromo Vigorelli	Iron Maiden
September 5	Stafford	England	Bingley Hall	Girl
September 6	Queensferry	Wales	Deeside Leisure Centre	Girl
September 8	London	England	Wembley Arena	Girl
September 9	London	England	Wembley Arena	—N/a
September 11	Neunkirchen am Brand	West Germany	Hemmerleinhalle	Iron Maiden
September 12	Düsseldorf	West Germany	Philips Halle	Iron Maiden
September 13	Frankfurt	West Germany	Rebstock-Gelände	Iron Maiden
September 15	Dortmund	West Germany	Westfalenhalle	Iron Maiden
September 17	Sindelfingen	West Germany	Messehalle	Iron Maiden
September 18	Munich	West Germany	Olympiahalle	Iron Maiden
September 20	Kassel	West Germany	Eissporthalle	Iron Maiden
September 21	Brussels	Belgium	Forest National	Iron Maiden
September 23	Avignon	France	Parc des Expositions de Châteaublanc	Iron Maiden
September 24	Lyon	France	Palais des Sports de Gerland	Iron Maiden
September 27	Paris	France	Hippodrome de Pantin	Iron Maiden
September 28	Basel	Switzerland	St. Jakobshalle	Iron Maiden
September 30	Cologne	West Germany	Sporthalle	Iron Maiden
October 1	Bremen	West Germany	Stadthalle Bremen	Iron Maiden
October 2	Hannover	West Germany	Niedersachsenhalle	Iron Maiden
October 4	Hamburg	West Germany	Ernst-Merck-Halle	Iron Maiden
October 5	Leiden	Netherlands	Groenoordhallen	Iron Maiden
October 6	Karlsruhe	West Germany	Schwarzwaldhalle	Iron Maiden
October 9	Stockholm	Sweden	Eriksdalshallen	Iron Maiden
October 10	Gothenburg	Sweden	Scandinavium	Iron Maiden
October 11	Copenhagen	Denmark	Brøndbyhallen	Iron Maiden
October 13	Drammen	Norway	Drammenshallen	Iron Maiden
November 8	Perth	Australia	Perth Entertainment Centre	The Eyes
November 9	Perth	Australia	Perth Entertainment Centre	The Eyes
November 10	Perth	Australia	Perth Entertainment Centre	The Eyes
November 11	Perth	Australia	Perth Entertainment Centre	The Eyes
November 15	Melbourne	Australia	VFL Park	The Eyes
November 18	Adelaide	Australia	Adelaide Oval	The Eyes
November 21	Sydney	Australia	Sydney Showground	The Eyes
November 22	Sydney	Australia	Sydney Showground	The Eyes
November 25	Brisbane	Australia	Lang Park	The Eyes
November 30	Wellington	New Zealand	Athletic Park	Techtones
December 3	Auckland	New Zealand	Western Springs Stadium	Techtones

=== Cancelled dates ===
Date	City	Country	Venue	Reason
May 19, 1980	Oslo	Norway	Ekeberghallen	Extended time needed to find replacement for Peter Criss
May 21, 1980	Copenhagen	Denmark	Brøndbyhallen	Extended time needed to find replacement for Peter Criss
May 23, 1980	Stockholm	Sweden	Eriksdalshallen	Extended time needed to find replacement for Peter Criss
May 24, 1980	Gothenburg	Sweden	Scandinavium	Extended time needed to find replacement for Peter Criss
May 27, 1980	Munich	West Germany	Olympiahalle	Extended time needed to find replacement for Peter Criss
May 28, 1980	Zwolle	Netherlands	IJsselhallen	Extended time needed to find replacement for Peter Criss
May 30, 1980	Rotterdam	Netherlands	Ahoy Rotterdam	Extended time needed to find replacement for Peter Criss
May 31, 1980	Brussels	Belgium	Forest National	Extended time needed to find replacement for Peter Criss
June 3, 1980	Saarbrücken	West Germany	Saarlandhalle	Extended time needed to find replacement for Peter Criss
June 4, 1980	Paris	France	Pavillon de Paris	Extended time needed to find replacement for Peter Criss
June 5, 1980	Lyon	France	Palais des Sports de Gerland	Extended time needed to find replacement for Peter Criss
June 7, 1980	Avignon	France	Parc des Expositions de Châteaublanc	Extended time needed to find replacement for Peter Criss
June 8, 1980	Fréjus	France	Arènes de Fréjus	Extended time needed to find replacement for Peter Criss
June 10, 1980	Barcelona	Spain	Palau dels Esports de Barcelona	Extended time needed to find replacement for Peter Criss
June 11, 1980	Madrid	Spain	Pabellón de la Ciudad Deportiva del Real Madrid	Extended time needed to find replacement for Peter Criss
June 14, 1980	Zürich	Switzerland	Hallenstadion	Extended time needed to find replacement for Peter Criss
June 15, 1980	Sindelfingen	West Germany	Messehalle	Extended time needed to find replacement for Peter Criss
June 16, 1980	Frankfurt	West Germany	Festhalle Frankfurt	Extended time needed to find replacement for Peter Criss
June 18, 1980	Eppelheim	West Germany	Rhein-Neckar-Halle	Extended time needed to find replacement for Peter Criss
June 20, 1980	Köln	West Germany	Köln Sporthalle	Extended time needed to find replacement for Peter Criss
June 21, 1980	Dortmund	West Germany	Westfalenhalle	Extended time needed to find replacement for Peter Criss
June 22, 1980	Bremen	West Germany	Stadthalle Bremen	Extended time needed to find replacement for Peter Criss
June 23, 1980	Hamburg	West Germany	Ernst-Merck-Halle	Extended time needed to find replacement for Peter Criss
June 25, 1980	Brighton	United Kingdom	Brighton Centre	Extended time needed to find replacement for Peter Criss
June 27, 1980	London	United Kingdom	Wembley Arena	Extended time needed to find replacement for Peter Criss
June 28, 1980	London	United Kingdom	Wembley Arena	Extended time needed to find replacement for Peter Criss
July 1, 1980	Stafford	United Kingdom	Bingley Hall	Extended time needed to find replacement for Peter Criss
July 3, 1980	Edinburgh	United Kingdom	Royal Highland Showground	Extended time needed to find replacement for Peter Criss
August 9, 1980	Mexico City	Mexico	Unknown Venue	Promoter couldn't obtain the necessary permits
August 10, 1980	Mexico City	Mexico	Unknown Venue	Promoter couldn't obtain the necessary permits
August 11, 1980	Mexico City	Mexico	Unknown Venue	Promoter couldn't obtain the necessary permits
August 12, 1980	Guadalajara	Mexico	Unknown Venue	Promoter couldn't obtain the necessary permits
August 14, 1980	Monterrey	Mexico	Unknown Venue	Promoter couldn't obtain the necessary permits
August 24, 1980	Cascais	Portugal	Pavilhão de Cascais	—N/a
August 25, 1980	Cascais	Portugal	Pavilhão de Cascais	—N/a
August 30, 1980	Perugia	Italy	Stadio Renato Curi	—N/a
August 31, 1980	Bologna	Italy	Stadio Renato Dall'Ara	—N/a
September 26, 1980	Lille	France	Lille Grand Palais	Low ticket sales
October 16, 1980	Paris	France	Hippodrome de Pantin	—N/a
October 20, 1980	Tokyo	Japan	Nippon Budokan	—N/a
October 21, 1980	Tokyo	Japan	Nippon Budokan	—N/a
October 24, 1980	Tokyo	Japan	Nippon Budokan	—N/a
October 27, 1980	Kyoto	Japan	—N/a	—N/a
October 28, 1980	Nagoya	Japan	—N/a	—N/a
October 29, 1980	Osaka	Japan	—N/a	—N/a
October 30, 1980	Osaka	Japan	—N/a	—N/a

== Personnel ==
- Paul Stanley – vocals, rhythm guitar
- Gene Simmons – vocals, bass
- Ace Frehley – lead guitar, vocals
- Eric Carr – drums, vocals
