= Lick It Up =

- Cover photo by Bernard Vidal

Studio album by Kiss
- Released: September 23, 1983
- Recorded: July–August 1983
- Studios: Right Track Recording, The Record Plant, Atlantic Studios and The Hit Factory, New York City
- Genres: Glam metal; hard rock; heavy metal
- Length: 41:27
- Label: Mercury
- Producers: Michael James Jackson; Gene Simmons; Paul Stanley

Kiss chronology
| Creatures of the Night (1982) | Lick It Up (1983) | Animalize (1984) |

Singles from Lick It Up
- 1. "Lick It Up" Released: September 18, 1983; 2. "All Hell's Breakin' Loose" Released: February 6, 1984

Alternative cover
- Japanese obi sheet cover of Lick It Up

Lick It Up is the eleventh studio album by American rock band Kiss. Before its 1983 release, the band members appeared on MTV without their trademark make-up. It was the first public appearance without make-up by the band, and their first for Mercury Records, where they had been signed following their departure from Casablanca Records. By December 1990, seven years after release, the album was certified platinum by the RIAA for selling over a million units in the US.

== Recording and release ==
As soon as the Creatures of the Night Tour/10th Anniversary Tour wrapped up in June, the band immediately went back into the studio to begin work on their next album, which was recorded over the next two months. Lick It Up built upon the harder sound Kiss had displayed on 1982's Creatures of the Night. While Vinnie Vincent contributed lead guitar to six songs on Creatures of the Night as a session player, by the time Lick It Up was released and for all the public knew, he was officially the guitarist in Kiss and played all the lead guitar on the album. For the first time, Vincent appeared on the cover art for the album, whereas Ace Frehley had appeared on the Creatures of the Night cover, despite having already left the band and not being involved in the recording of the album. The opening track (co-written by Vincent) features a solo from Rick Derringer.

"Lick It Up" and "All Hell's Breakin' Loose" were released as singles from the album. They were accompanied by a pair of similarly themed, tongue-in-cheek videos featuring the band (along with many scantily clad women) in desolate, post-apocalyptic settings. "All Hell's Breakin' Loose" is one of three songs in the history of the band in which all four (current at the time) members share songwriting credit, the others being "Love Theme from Kiss" from their debut album and "Back to the Stone Age" from Monster.

== Vincent membership ==
Vincent was not legally a member of the band. Due partly to disputes over what his role in the band and his pay would be (some reports indicated that he had asked for, and was flatly denied, a percentage of the band's gross profits), Vincent never signed any contract making his employment official. These disputes, along with a growing attitude by him that he was solely responsible for the resurgence of Kiss, would lead to him leaving the band (or being fired, depending on the source) after the European leg of the Lick It Up tour.

With the band unable to secure a replacement guitarist on such short notice, Vincent was enticed to return for the American leg of the tour; however, his refusal to sign his contract continued to be a sore point. A major rift developed between him and the rest of the band over his guitar solos. What were supposed to be 5–8 minute solos, timed to finish on a cue so that Paul Stanley could introduce the next song, suddenly extended in some instances, leaving the rest of the band impatiently waiting on stage for Vincent to finish.

During a performance at the Long Beach Arena in January 1984, Vincent’s solo had gone on for an extended period of time, despite Stanley cueing him to finish the solo. The two nearly engaged into an altercation in the dressing room afterwards, with Stanley accusing Vincent of directing most of the attention at himself, and Vincent accusing the other three members of ruining his solo, claiming they were trying to limit him as a performer. The two were separated by Eric Carr and Gene Simmons and multiple roadies during the argument. At a March 12th show in Quebec City, Canada, as the band prepared to close out their set, Vincent broke into an impromptu solo, leaving the other band members standing on stage with nothing to do. Vincent left (or was fired for a second time, depending on the source) shortly after with his last show being in Evansville on March 17th. This time, the break was permanent. During the spring Vincent demoed songs with drummer Hirsh Gardner for the next Kiss album and negotiated with Simmons and Stanley about continuing in Kiss. Vincent states that he finally turned down Stanley's offer in June 1984.

== Reception and legacy ==
Professional ratings
Review scores
| Source | Rating |
|---|---|
| AllMusic | 3.5/5 stars |
| Collector's Guide to Heavy Metal | 8/10 |
| Encyclopedia of Popular Music | 2/5 stars |
| Rolling Stone | 1/5 stars |
| The Rolling Stone Album Guide | 2/5 stars |

The album marked a turnaround from the band's flagging fortunes of the previous several years and successfully introduced them to a new generation of fans, as well as marking the beginning of the "unmasked" era that would last for the next decade. In an interview for KISSology 2, Stanley said that "people were now listening with their eyes rather than their ears, mainly because Creatures of the Night was arguably a better album than Lick It Up." He also made the statement that "The only reason why I think people bought Lick It Up more than Creatures of the Night was because we had no make-up on. That was the only reason."

Lick It Up was certified gold on December 22, 1983, the first Kiss album to achieve certification since 1980's Unmasked. It was certified platinum in the US on December 19, 1990. Kerrang! listed Lick It Up at No. 3 on its year-end list of the best hard rock albums of 1983. In 2011, the album placed at No. 10 in Guitar World's readers poll of the top 10 guitar albums of 1983.

The video for "All Hell's Breakin' Loose" was nominated for Best Cinematography at the 1984 MTV Video Music Awards.

The song "Lick It Up" is a staple of the band's live performances. Due to its popularity among fans, Kiss has performed the song over 1,500 times as of December 2022, making it one of the group's top ten most played pieces.

== Track listing ==
All credits adapted from the original release.

Side one
| No. | Title | Writer(s) | Lead vocals | Length |
|---|---|---|---|---|
| 1. | "Exciter" | Paul Stanley, Vinnie Vincent | Stanley | 4:10 |
| 2. | "Not for the Innocent" | Gene Simmons, Vincent | Simmons | 4:22 |
| 3. | "Lick It Up" | Stanley, Vincent | Stanley | 3:56 |
| 4. | "Young and Wasted" | Simmons, Vincent | Simmons | 4:05 |
| 5. | "Gimme More" | Stanley, Vincent | Stanley | 3:43 |

Side two
| No. | Title | Writer(s) | Lead vocals | Length |
|---|---|---|---|---|
| 6. | "All Hell's Breakin' Loose" | Eric Carr, Stanley, Simmons, Vincent | Stanley | 4:34 |
| 7. | "A Million to One" | Stanley, Vincent | Stanley | 4:17 |
| 8. | "Fits Like a Glove" | Simmons | Simmons | 4:04 |
| 9. | "Dance All Over Your Face" | Simmons | Simmons | 4:16 |
| 10. | "And on the 8th Day" | Simmons, Vincent | Simmons | 4:02 |

== Personnel ==
Kiss

- Paul Stanley – vocals, rhythm guitar, producer, bass on "Gimme More"
- Gene Simmons – vocals, bass, producer
- Eric Carr – drums, percussion, backing vocals
- Vinnie Vincent – lead guitar, backing vocals

Additional musician

- Rick Derringer – guitar solo on "Exciter"

Production

- Michael James Jackson – producer
- Frank Filipetti – engineer, mixing
- Rob Freeman – basic tracks engineer on "Lick It Up", "Dance All Over Your Face", and "And on the 8th Day"
- Maria Marquis, Stephen Benben – assistant engineers
- Dave Wittman, Dave Caccavo – additional engineering
- George Marino – mastering at Sterling Sound, New York

== Charts ==
| Chart (1983) | Peak position |
|---|---|
| Australian Albums (Kent Music Report) | 36 |
| Austrian Albums (Ö3 Austria) | 13 |
| Canada Top Albums/CDs (RPM) | 46 |
| Dutch Albums (Album Top 100) | 14 |
| Finnish Albums (The Official Finnish Charts) | 7 |
| French Albums (SNEP) | 17 |
| German Albums (Offizielle Top 100) | 18 |
| Icelandic Albums Chart | 5 |
| Japanese Albums (Oricon) | 15 |
| Norwegian Albums (VG-lista) | 7 |
| Spain (AFYVE) | 24 |
| Swedish Albums (Sverigetopplistan) | 3 |
| Swiss Albums (Schweizer Hitparade) | 10 |
| UK Albums (Official Charts) | 7 |
| US Billboard 200 | 24 |

== Certifications ==
| Region | Certification | Certified units/sales |
|---|---|---|
| Canada (Music Canada) | Gold | 50,000^{^} |
| Sweden (GLF) | Gold | 50,000^{^} |
| United States (RIAA) | Platinum | 1,000,000^{^} |
^{^} Shipments figures based on certification alone.
