= NAF Neunkirchener Achsenfabrik =

German construction and agricultural machinery company

- Industry: Component supplier
- Founded: 1960
- Headquarters: Neunkirchen am Brand, Bavaria, Germany
- Area served: Worldwide
- Key people: Dr. Norbert Knorren (Director and CFO), Bernhard Schnabel (Director and CTO), Erwin Urban (Director and COO)
- Products: Heavy duty drive lines for Agriculture, Construction, Forestry machinery
- Number of employees: More than 600
- Website: www.nafaxles.com

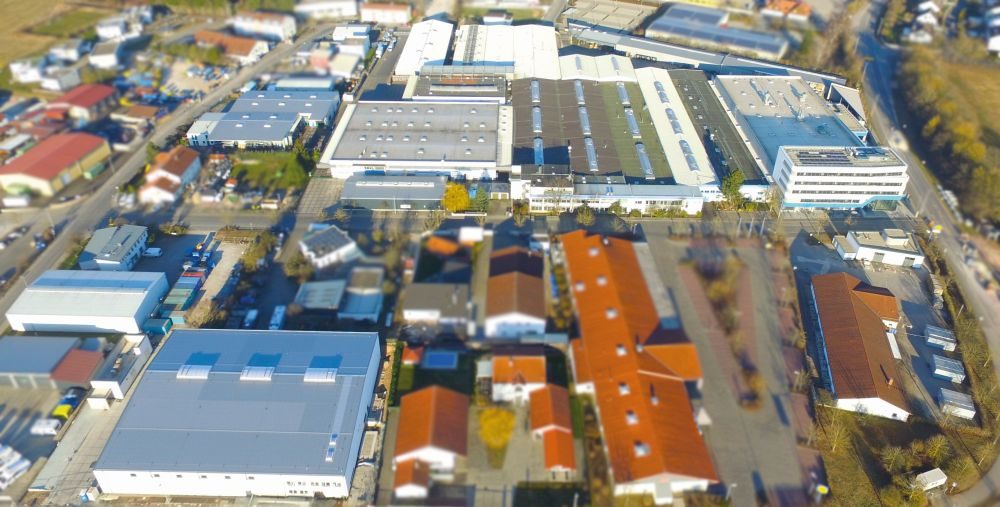
Aerial view of NAF AG headquarters in 2022

The NAF Neunkirchener Achsenfabrik AG is a medium-sized family-run company in Neunkirchen am Brand, Bavaria, Germany. NAF manufactures axles and transfer cases for self-propelled applications for construction, forestry and agriculture machinery. NAF is the market leader for powered bogie axles (forestry machinery drives).

== History ==
The NAF was founded on 24 March 1960 by the then mayor of Neunkirchen and member of Bavarian state parliament, Georg Hemmerlein, and the entrepreneur Kaspar Lochner from Munich, Germany. In 1968 the production of planetary axles started. In 1970, the research and development office in Munich was opened by Ernst Auer. In 1974 Helmut Weyhausen took over the company. Since 1976, bogie axles are manufactured.

In 2017/2018, a new paint shop and a five-storey office building were added to the existing factory. The newly built painting shop is fully automated, works with the latest generation of painting robots and enables the painting of axles weighing up to 6 tonnes.

In 2021, the ground-breaking ceremony was held for a new test centre, which was completed in 2023.

In 2024, the construction of a new building complex (“NAF Forum”) started. The complex will host a new canteen as well as offices. The completion of the constructions works is planned für December 2025.

== Awards ==
- 1995 initial certification ISO 9001
- 2007 quality seal „Sicher mit System“ ("Systematic Safety") for effective occupational health and safety by employer's liability insurance association
- 2009 130. Jobstar of metropolitan region Nuremberg
- 2016 initial certification ISO 14001
- 2016 initial certification ISO 50001
- 2019 initial certification ISO 45001
- 2020 Bayerns Best 50
- 2025 Bayerns Best 50

== Offices ==
- 2007 NAF Russia GmbH, Ekaterinburg, Russia
- 2015 NAF Axles North America Inc., Morris, Illinois, USA

== Products ==
The NAF manufactures heavy duty drive lines for off-road applications worldwide such as:

- construction machinery (wheeled loader, wheeled excavator, articulated dump truck, motor grader, compactor, roller)
- forestry machinery (forwarder, harvester, skidder, feller buncher)
- agriculture machinery (forage harvester, self-propelled cutter-bar, combined harvester, self-propelled sprayer, sugar-beet harvester, pineapple harvester, pea harvester)
- other applications (airport equipment, harbor cranes, loader for scrap and recycling yards, mining equipment, heavy haul trucks)

Products are:

- axles
  - planetary bogie axles
  - portal bogie axles
  - planetary portal bogie axles
  - planetary steering axles
  - planetary rigid axles
- transfer cases
  - transfer cases
  - transfer cases for two hydraulic motors (DualSync®)
- components
  - differential gears
  - planetary hubs
