= Bernard Vidal =

French painter (born 1944)

Bernard Vidal (born 23 August 1944 in Périgueux) is a French painter who has been honored by the French Government with the Chevalier dans l'Ordre Des Arts et des Lettres, the highest distinction in the Arts in France.

Vidal started to paint at the early age of four years and went on to study Art at the Ecole des Beaux Art in Paris. After holding the position of artistic director at famous French communication agencies, he created his own agency in 1984. He recently retired and dedicated himself to his true passion — painting.

Bernard Vidal's “Positivism” or "Fauvism" is experienced best in his various landscapes with robust, bright colors. Collectors and experts worldwide have praised Vidals use of color and energy in his art.

Bernard Vidal's first major exhibition was in 1992 at The Gallery of Art and Art in Paris, France. His work has since been shown at over twenty galleries and exhibitions throughout the World.

Bernard Vidal was featured in the first-ever exposition of a living painter at the Carrousel du Louvre Paris.
