= Creatures of the Night Tour/10th Anniversary Tour =

1982–1983 concert tour by Kiss

Creatures of the Night/10th Anniversary Tour
- Tour by Kiss
- Tour poster
- Associated album: Creatures of the Night
- Start date: December 29, 1982
- End date: June 25, 1983
- Legs: 2
- No. of shows: 56 played

Kiss concert chronology
- Unmasked Tour (1980); Creatures of the Night Tour/10th Anniversary Tour (1982–1983); Lick It Up World Tour (1983–1984)

The Creatures of the Night Tour/10th Anniversary Tour was a concert tour by the hard rock group Kiss in support of their album of the same title. It was the second tour with drummer Eric Carr, his first in the United States, and the first tour with guitarist Vinnie Vincent, (née Vincent Cusano) who replaced Ace Frehley.

== Background ==
In June 1982, Frehley told Paul Stanley and Gene Simmons that he was leaving Kiss, although it would take 12 months for lawyers to negotiate the lead guitarist's complete departure. In an effort to prolong their lucrative recording contract, Frehley agreed to participate in a press conference on October 22, 1982 and to travel to Europe for a promotional tour in late November. Meanwhile Stanley designed a new persona for Frehley's replacement, Vincent Cusano. Wearing a makeup design of an Egyptian "ankh", Cusano adopted the stage name "Vinnie 'The Wiz' Vincent," who was "even weirder than we are" in the tour's press release. The groups' lucrative record contract with PolyGram required Kiss to be composed of founders Stanley (vocals/rhythm guitar), Simmons (bass/vocals) and Frehley. The release did not say Frehley had quit, but instead stated Frehley was too injured from a recent car crash to tour, but might make appearances onstage when able. The band used group photos containing Ace Frehley for the tour's press kits and ad material during early dates; these were used by promoters for advertising, so many fans did not realize Frehley was replaced until they came to the venues. Before Vincent was announced, new photos were taken and later dates featured the band with Vincent in show ads.

Attendance in North America was abysmal; even though the band had returned to its signature hard rock after a couple of years of pop and disco-influenced music, very few people showed up at the concerts on the tour. Even worse was the fact that the band couldn't drum up interest despite it being their 10th anniversary and their first tour of the US in over three years, an unprecedented amount of time for them during that era. Frontman Paul Stanley recalled a show in Lexington, Kentucky where he threw a guitar pick that went over the entire audience of 2,500 and hit the floor. On March 11, they decided not to book dates beyond April 3, although they accepted a short tour of Brazil in June. Kiss played to the biggest crowd of their career at Maracanã Stadium in Rio de Janeiro, Brazil, with 137,000 people in the audience. According to the band management, promoters were actually interested in booking Kiss in smaller venues such as large nightclubs and smaller theatres where they would have had an easier time selling out shows. The band, however, refused to play anything except arenas and large theatres.

During their North American tour, Kiss was met with accusations from religious groups of promoting Satanism through their music and image, and several protests were held by such groups outside concert venues; however, Kiss politely denied the accusations and the tour continued.

This tour is the only tour to feature live performances of "Rock and Roll Hell" and "Keep Me Comin" from the Creatures of the Night LP, although both would be dropped from the set almost immediately. "I Want You" returned to the setlist for the first time since the Alive II Tour in 1978. The band sang the chant that opened and closed their new main single "I Love It Loud", but by the tour's end, this was changed and only Simmons sang it.

The Plasmatics were the opening act in the middle of the tour while heavy metal band Mötley Crüe opened for Kiss on the final dates of the North American leg after Kiss noticed their notoriety growing. Molly Hatchet, Night Ranger and Zebra were also the opening acts for several concerts on the tour. The Headpins, from Vancouver, BC, opened all four shows in Canada.

In the tour program for the band's final tour, both Simmons and Stanley reflected on the tour:

When we were working on Creatures of the Night, I said, "I want to write something that sounds like "My Generation," something that says, "This is who I am and this is what I believe in. – Gene Simmons

On record and on the subsequent tour, Creatures of the Night was very much a recapturing of our desire and our focus as a band and a reclaiming of what was important to us. When we did Creatures it was that step of us declaring that we were back. – Paul Stanley

== Stage set ==
Simmons described the tour's visual effects: "There's some fire-breathing and blood-spitting into the air and we give birth on stage and there's some fire balls that go thirty feet up into the air. And it rains fire and also some rockets take off on stage, and the stage looks like a tank sixty feet wide. You actually feel it in your chest when the tank moves. And then the drum riser, which is on top of the tank, goes forward, moves left and right, and actually fires like a real tank."

== Set list ==
1. "Creatures of the Night"
2. "Detroit Rock City"
3. "Cold Gin"
4. "Calling Dr. Love"
5. "I Want You"
6. "I Love It Loud"
7. "Firehouse"
8. "War Machine"
9. "Love Gun"
10. "God of Thunder"
11. "I Still Love You"
12. "Shout It Out Loud"
13. "Black Diamond"

Encore

14. "Strutter"
15. "Rock and Roll All Nite"
- "Rock and Roll Hell" was dropped after the first three shows.
- "Keep Me Comin'" was also played live on this tour, but it was dropped after the first two shows.
- "Shout It Out Loud" was dropped from the set list after the February 1 concert in Knoxville, TN.
- "I Love It Loud" was played twice in São Paulo-Brazil (instead of "Strutter").

== Tour dates ==
Date	City	Country	Venue	Opening Act(s)
North America
December 29, 1982	Bismarck	United States	Bismarck Civic Center^{1}	Hotz
December 30, 1982	Sioux City	United States	Sioux City Municipal Auditorium	Dare Force
December 31, 1982	Rockford	United States	Rockford MetroCentre	Shoes
January 1, 1983	Terre Haute	United States	Hulman Center	Why On Earth
January 4, 1983	Charleston	United States	Charleston Civic Center	Defectors
January 6, 1983	Lexington	United States	Rupp Arena	Night Ranger
January 7, 1983	Saginaw	United States	Wendler Arena	Night Ranger
January 8, 1983	Toledo	United States	Toledo Sports Arena	Night Ranger
January 9, 1983	Dayton	United States	University of Dayton Arena	Night Ranger
January 12, 1983	Quebec City	Canada	Colisée de Quebec	The Headpins
January 13, 1983	Montreal	Canada	Montreal Forum	The Headpins
January 14, 1983	Toronto	Canada	Maple Leaf Gardens	The Headpins
January 15, 1983	Ottawa	Canada	Ottawa Civic Centre	The Headpins
January 16, 1983	Glens Falls	United States	Glens Falls Civic Center	Night Ranger
January 18, 1983	Syracuse	United States	Onondaga County War Memorial	Night Ranger
January 20, 1983	Rochester	United States	Rochester Community War Memorial	Night Ranger
January 21, 1983	Portland	United States	Cumberland County Civic Center	Night Ranger
January 22, 1983	Worcester	United States	The Centrum^{2}	Night Ranger
January 25, 1983	Norfolk	United States	Norfolk Scope	Night Ranger
January 27, 1983	Huntsville	United States	Von Braun Civic Center	Night Ranger
January 28, 1983	Birmingham	United States	Boutwell Auditorium	Night Ranger
January 29, 1983	Chattanooga	United States	UTC Arena	Night Ranger
January 30, 1983	Nashville	United States	Nashville Municipal Auditorium	Night Ranger
February 1, 1983	Knoxville	United States	Knoxville Civic Coliseum	Plasmatics
February 3, 1983	West Palm Beach	United States	West Palm Beach Auditorium	Plasmatics
February 4, 1983	Lakeland	United States	Lakeland Civic Center	Plasmatics
February 11, 1983	Pine Bluff	United States	Pine Bluff Convention Center	Plasmatics
February 14, 1983	New Orleans	United States	Louisiana Superdome	Zebra
February 16, 1983	Dubuque	United States	Five Flags Center	Plasmatics
February 18, 1983	Bloomington	United States	Met Center	Plasmatics
February 19, 1983	Sioux Falls	United States	Sioux Falls Arena	Plasmatics
February 20, 1983	La Crosse	United States	La Crosse Center	Plasmatics
February 22, 1983	Richfield	United States	Richfield Coliseum	Plasmatics
February 23, 1983	Detroit	United States	Cobo Arena	Plasmatics
February 24, 1983	Indianapolis	United States	Market Square Arena	Plasmatics
February 26, 1983	Springfield	United States	Prairie Capital Convention Center	Plasmatics
February 28, 1983	St. Louis	United States	Kiel Auditorium	Plasmatics
March 1, 1983	Kansas City	United States	Kansas City Municipal Auditorium	Molly Hatchet
March 9, 1983	Dallas	United States	Dallas Convention Center	Plasmatics
March 10, 1983	Houston	United States	Sam Houston Coliseum	Plasmatics
March 12, 1983	San Antonio	United States	HemisFair Arena	Plasmatics
March 13, 1983	Beaumont	United States	Beaumont Civic Center	Plasmatics
March 14, 1983	Corpus Christi	United States	Corpus Christi Memorial Coliseum	Plasmatics
March 18, 1983	Biloxi	United States	Mississippi Coast Coliseum	Plasmatics
March 19, 1983	Shreveport	United States	Hirsch Memorial Coliseum	Plasmatics
March 21, 1983	Norman	United States	Lloyd Noble Center	Plasmatics
March 23, 1983	El Paso	United States	El Paso County Coliseum	Plasmatics
March 26, 1983	Irvine	United States	Irvine Meadows Amphitheatre	Mötley Crüe
March 27, 1983	Los Angeles	United States	Universal Amphitheatre	Mötley Crüe
March 28, 1983	Phoenix	United States	Arizona Veterans Memorial Coliseum	Mötley Crüe
April 1, 1983	Las Vegas	United States	Aladdin Theater	Mötley Crüe
April 3, 1983	San Francisco	United States	San Francisco Civic Auditorium	Mötley Crüe
Brazil
June 18, 1983	Rio de Janeiro	Brazil	Maracanã Stadium	Herva Doce
June 23, 1983	Belo Horizonte	Brazil	Mineirão Stadium	—
June 25, 1983	São Paulo	Brazil	Morumbi Stadium^{3}	—

- ^Note 1 First show with Vinnie Vincent.
- ^Note 2 Paul Stanley announced from the stage they would not be allowed to use pyrotechnics. The show had none, except Simmons' firebreathing. Clips of this show and a quote from Paul Stanley backstage appeared on a Providence, Rhode Island TV station WPRI Channel 12 news story about the Centrum venue beating out the Civic Center for business, using Kiss as one example.
- ^Note 3 Kiss' last show in makeup until 1996.

=== Postponed and cancelled dates ===
Date	City	Country	Venue	Reasoning
December 27, 1982	Rapid City	United States	Rushmore Plaza Civic Center	Severe snow storm
January 23, 1983	Providence	United States	Providence Civic Center	Poor ticket sales; tickets for this show were exchanged for the Worcester, Massachusetts, show.
February 6, 1983	Charleston	United States	Charleston County Hall	Tentative date on the schedule. The concert was not advertised and no tickets went on sale
February 8, 1983	Asheville	United States	Asheville Civic Center	Tentative date on the schedule. The concert was not advertised and no tickets went on sale
February 9, 1983	Bristol, Tennessee	United States	Viking Hall Civic Center	Tentative date on the schedule. The concert was not advertised and no tickets went on sale
February 17, 1983	Duluth	United States	Duluth Arena	Poor ticket sales
March 31, 1983	San Diego	United States	San Diego Sports Arena	Poor ticket sales
June 20, 1983	Belo Horizonte	Brazil	Mineirão Stadium	Electrical outage during show, rescheduled for June 21; as a result only 30,000 of the expected 80,000 showed up.
June 24, 1983	São Paulo	Brazil	Morumbi Stadium	Reserved on the schedule for a second Sāo Paulo show
August 19–21, 1983	Buenos Aires	Argentina	Boca Juniors Stadium	Terrorist threat

=== Box office score data ===
List of box office score data with date, city, venue, attendance, gross, references
Date	City	Venue	Attendance	Gross	Ref(s)
December 29, 1982	Bismarck, United States	Civic Center	3,335 / 8,200	$30,011	
January 14, 1983	Toronto, Canada	Maple Leaf Gardens	9,565 / 10,000	$124,100	
January 15, 1983	Ottawa, Canada	Civic Centre	4,919 / 7,000	$59,028	
January 21, 1983	Portland, United States	Cumberland County Civic Center	4,338 / 4,500	$45,549	
January 22, 1983	Worcester, United States	The Centrum	10,147 / 11,000	$94,652	
January 27, 1983	Huntsville, United States	Von Braun Civic Center	5,025 / 10,106	$49,959	
January 29, 1983	Chattanooga, United States	UTC Arena	4,451 / 11,000	$43,533	
January 30, 1983	Nashville, United States	Municipal Auditorium	8,936 / 9,900	$92,841	
February 3, 1983	West Palm Beach, United States	Auditorium	5,202 / 6,200	$58,588	
February 14, 1983	New Orleans, United States	Louisiana Superdome	10,421 / 15,000	$107,866	
February 22, 1983	Richfield, United States	Coliseum	10,212 / 10,212	$10,120	

== Personnel ==
- Paul Stanley – vocals, rhythm guitar
- Gene Simmons – vocals, bass
- Eric Carr – drums, vocals
- Vinnie Vincent – lead guitar, backing vocals
