= Messe Sindelfingen =

Fair and convention center

Coordinates: 48.70529°N 9.03821°E

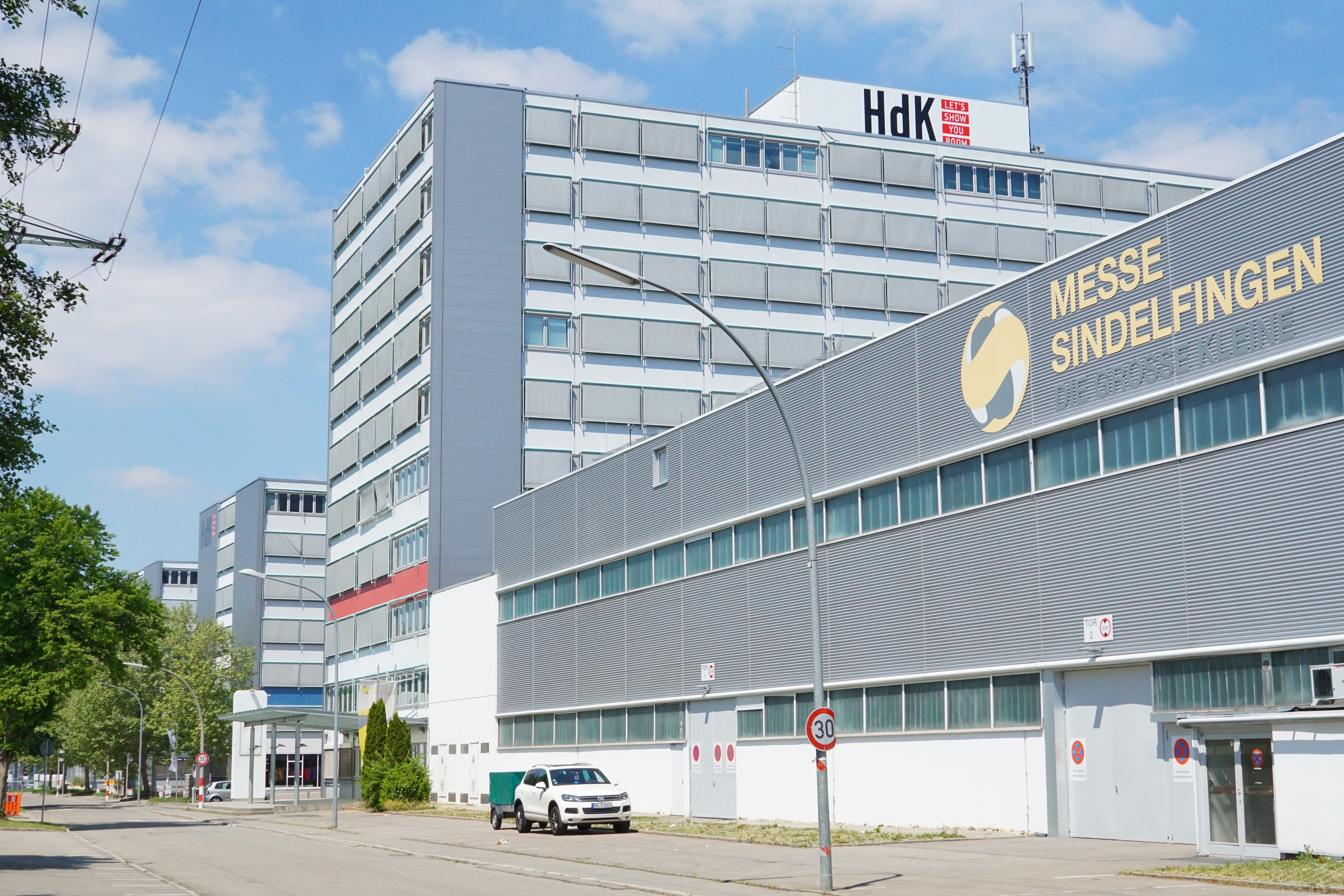
Messehalle Sindelfingen, Mahdentalstraße 116

Messe Sindelfingen, formerly known as Messehalle Sindelfingen, is a fair and convention center located in Sindelfingen, Germany, which was founded in 1973. It has one large hall with a 3,000-capacity and area of 8000 m² in total for exhibitions.

During the 1970s and 1980s it hosted concerts by many famous artists such as The Who, Deep Purple, Van Halen, Kiss and Whitesnake. Today the facility is mainly used for fairs and trade shows. During the covid-19 pandemic it was used as vaccination centre for Landkreis Böblingen.

Messe Sindelfingen got a large competitor in recent years, Messe Stuttgart, which is the 9th largest fair in Germany and only 15 km away at the airport in Stuttgart. However, the private owner has maintained its business by offering fairs on a smaller scale and budget and for a smaller and more local audience. It also has lost its former importance for music events, because Glaspalast Sindelfingen, which opened in 1977, is better equipped for large music events with a capacity of over 5,000. One of the biggest advantages was its quick accessibility from the nearby Bundesautobahn 81 and Bundesautobahn 8. During larger events the fair offered free shuttle service to the train station of Goldberg of the S-Bahn Stuttgart. I also has bus lines running to the city centres of Böblingen, Sindelfingen, and to Stuttgart-Vaihingen.

At the end of 2021 the management announced that the facility will have its last fair in March 2022 and close down after that. The area is about to undergo a major transformation from a commercial area to a more mixed area with large housing blocks, with new road connections and other developments that will deprive the facility from its few parking spaces and change the character of the quarter. The cul-de-sac at the location will be transformed into a main road and make loading and unloading of the trucks on the street impossible in the future.
