= Neunkirchen am Brand =

- Municipality
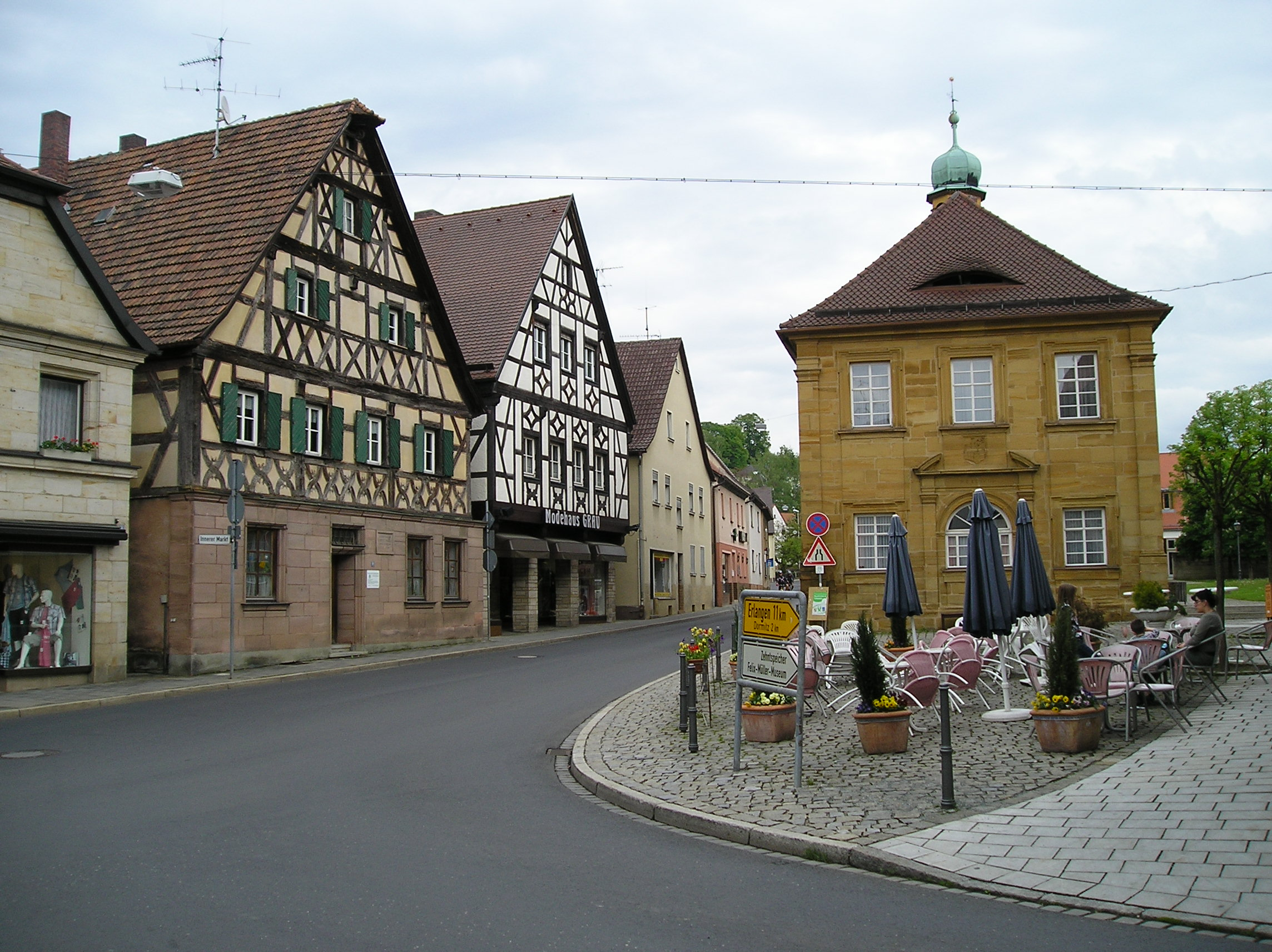
- Center of Neunkirchen with timbered houses and the old deanery near St.-Michaels Church (right side of the image)

- Coat of arms

- Location of Neunkirchen am Brand within Forchheim district
- Interactive map of Neunkirchen am Brand
- Location within Germany Location within Bavaria
- Coordinates: 49°37′N 11°08′E
- Country: Germany
- State: Bavaria
- Admin. region: Oberfranken
- District: Forchheim

Government
  - Mayor (2020–26): Martin Walz (CSU)

Area
  - Total: 26.39 km^{2} (10.19 sq mi)
- Elevation: 317 m (1,040 ft)

Population (2025-12-31)
  - Total: 8,052
  - Density: 305.1/km^{2} (790.2/sq mi)
- Time zone: UTC+01:00 (CET)
  - Summer (DST): UTC+02:00 (CEST)
- Postal codes: 91077
- Dialling codes: 09134
- Vehicle registration: FO
- Website: www.neunkirchen-am-brand.de

Neunkirchen am Brand (German pronunciation: [ˈnɔʏnkɪʁçn̩ ʔam ˈbʁant]) is a municipality in the district of Forchheim in Bavaria in Germany.

== History ==
Important dates are the founding of the Canons Regular of Saint Augustine monastery, Neunkirchen am Brand monastery, in 1314 and the conferment of the status as market town in 1410. In 1803 Neunkirchen along with the Prince-Bishopric of Bamberg became part of Bavaria. Between 1886 and 1963 Neunkirchen was located near a train route from Erlangen to Eschenau.

After the Second World War, refugees settled in Neunkirchen and after the establishment of Siemens AG in Erlangen the town experienced a dramatic increase in inhabitants. Numerous suburbs were built around the traditional center of the town.

Neunkirchen is also the home of a number of industrial and trade companies. The largest industrial employer is the axles factory, the Neunkirchener Achsenfabrik (NAF).

== Districts ==
There are the following districts (pop. statistics as of December 31, 2006):

- Neunkirchen (5995 inhabitants)
- Baad (85 inhabitants)
- Ebersbach (250 inhabitants)
- Ermreuth (921 inhabitants)
- Großenbuch (575 inhabitants)
- Rödlas (149 inhabitants)
- Rosenbach (261 inhabitants)
- Gleisenhof (near Ermreuth) and Wellucken (7 inhabitants)

Furthermore, there the farms Vogelhof, Erleinhof and Saarmühle.

== Sights and culture ==
The town is marked by well preserved gates, the former Neunkirchen am Brand Monastery, countless timbered houses and a Middle Age warehouse known as a Zehntscheune. In the district of Großenbuch, the Kugler family operates a restaurant that has existed in that location since the 1500s.

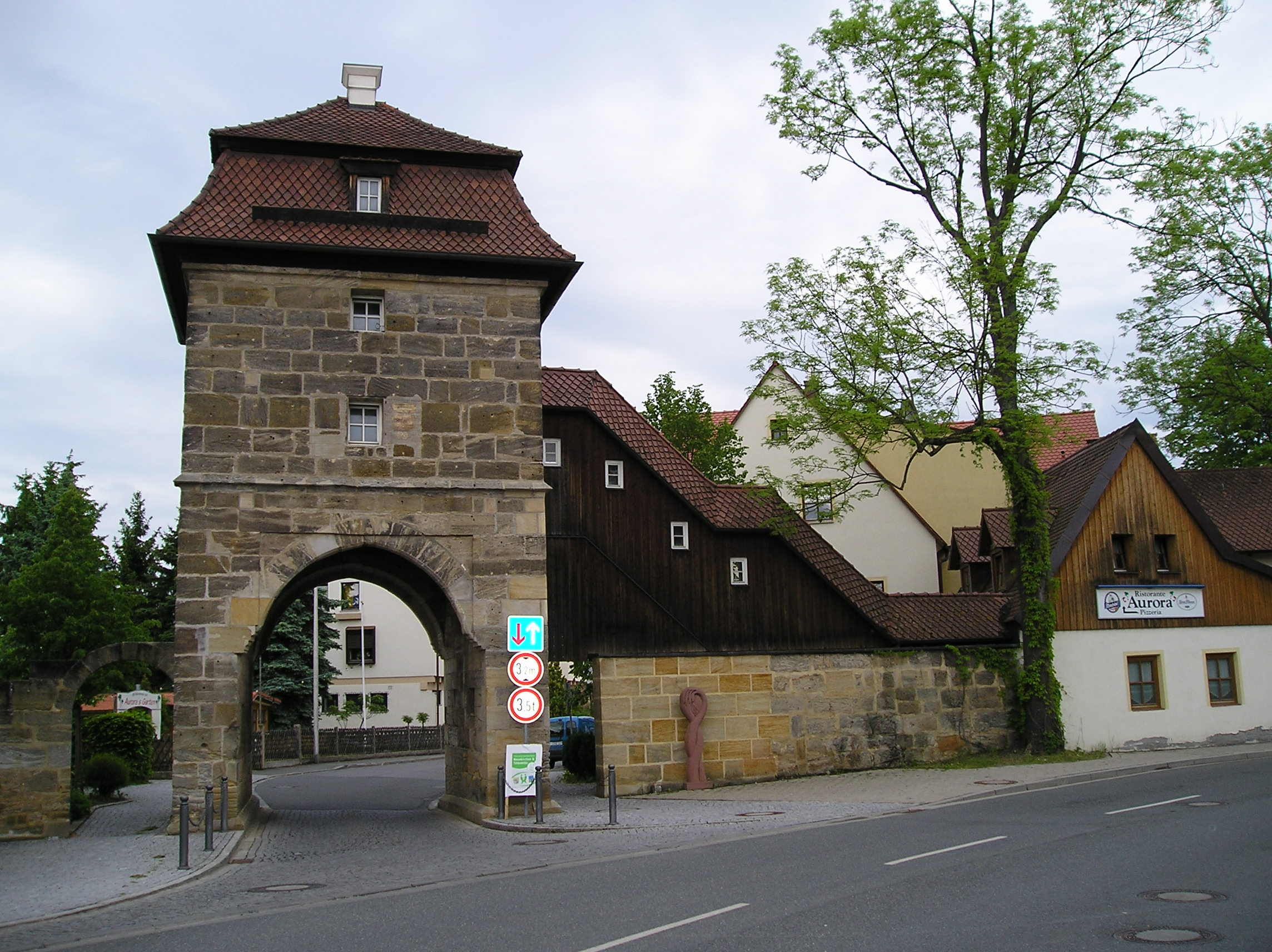
Erlanger Gate of the old defensive wall

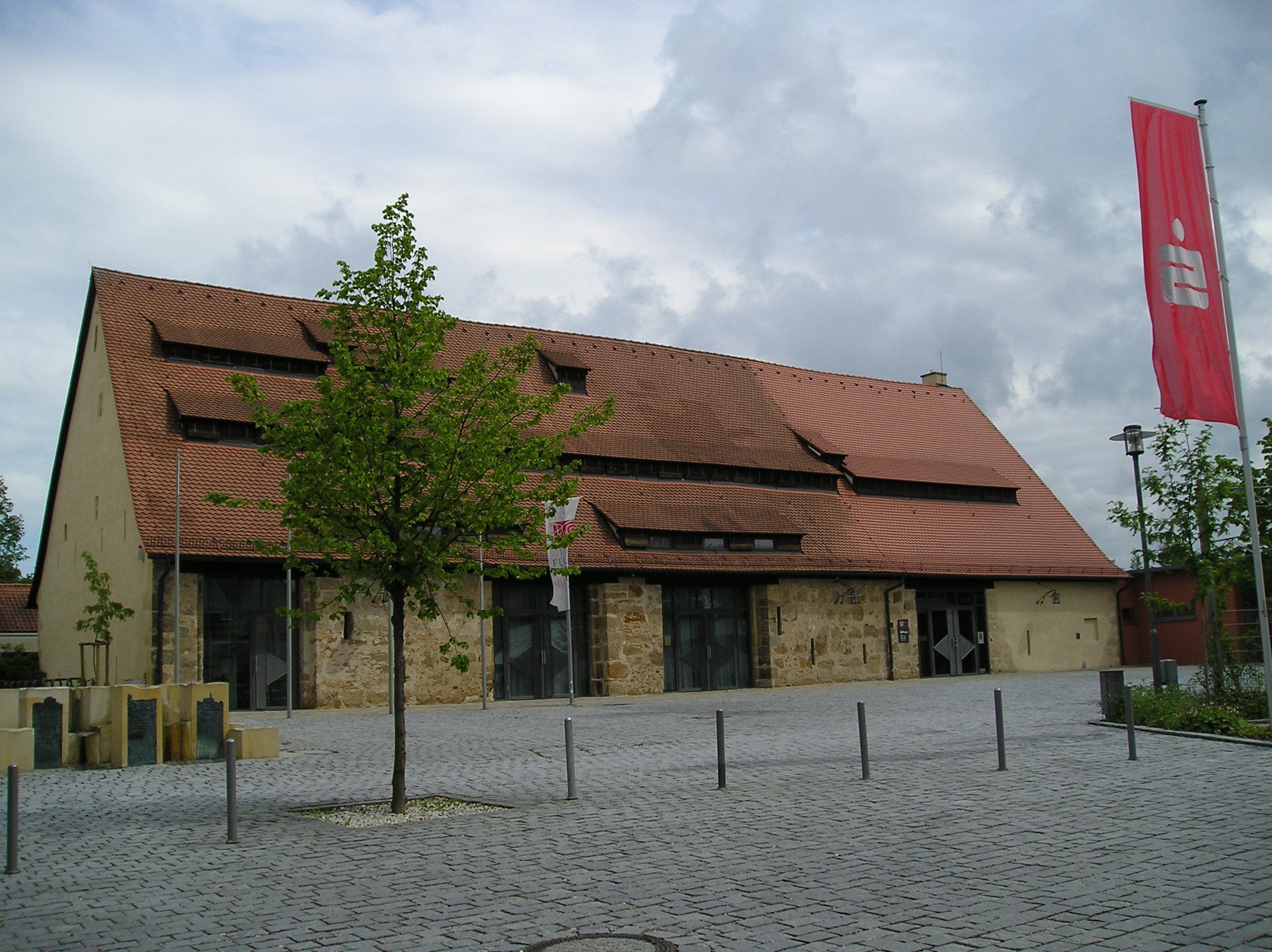
The Middle Age warehouse of the old monastery

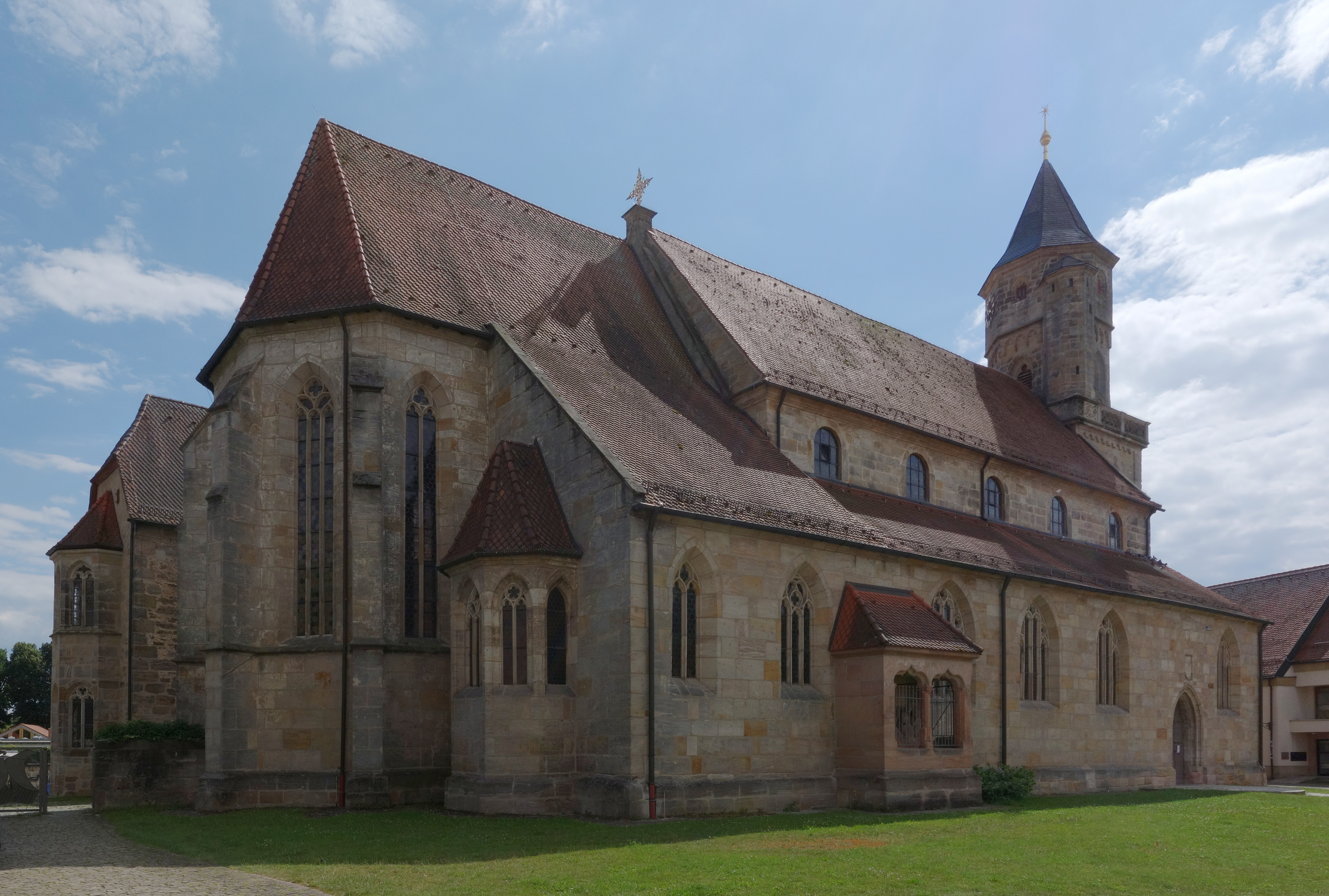
St. Michael's Church, part of the old monastery

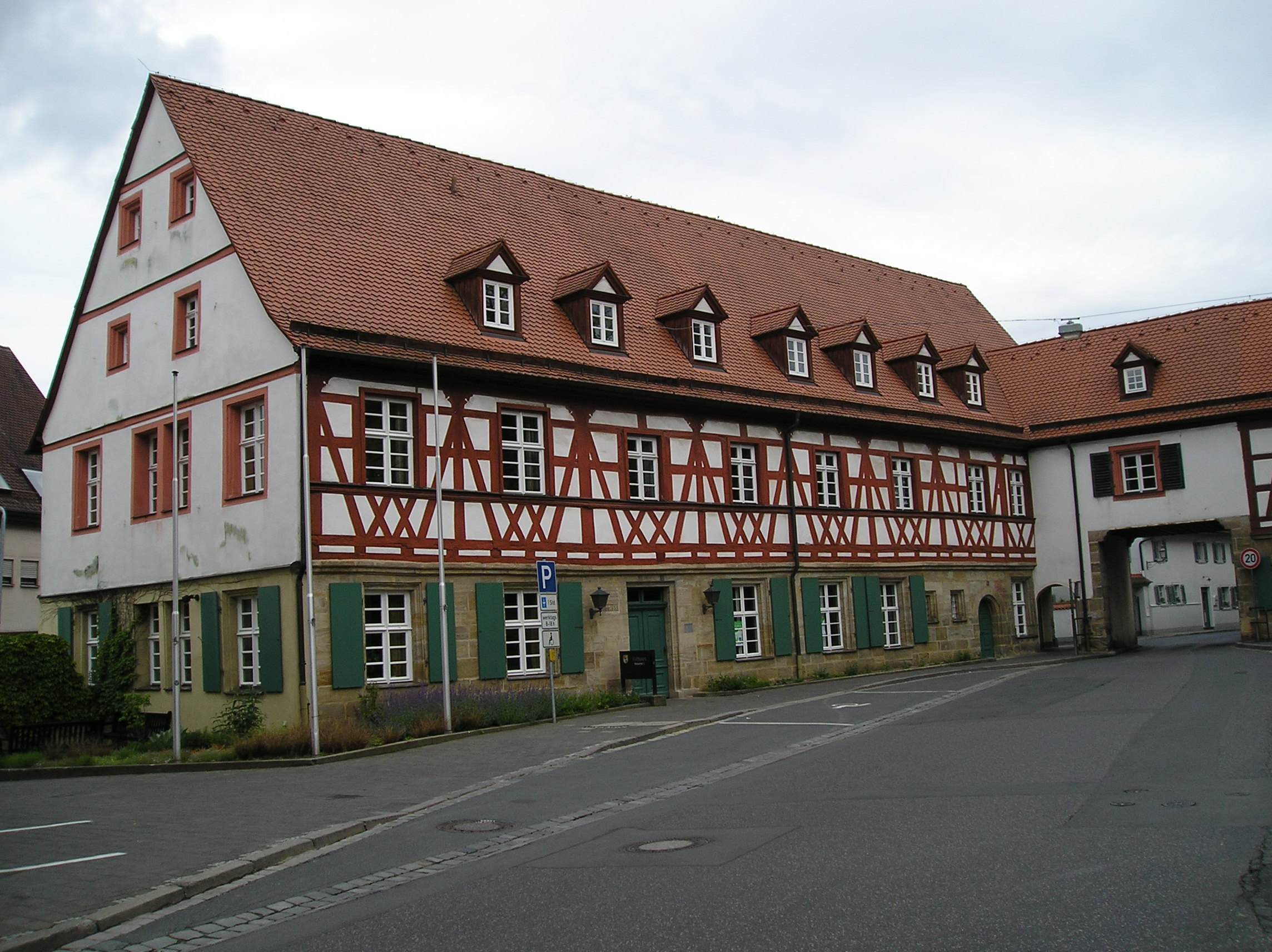
The new city hall in the old monastery school, to the right the gate to the monastery

=== Buildings ===
In the district of Ermreuth, the former synagogue was restored as a venue for various events. Worth seeing in this districts are also the church and the castle.

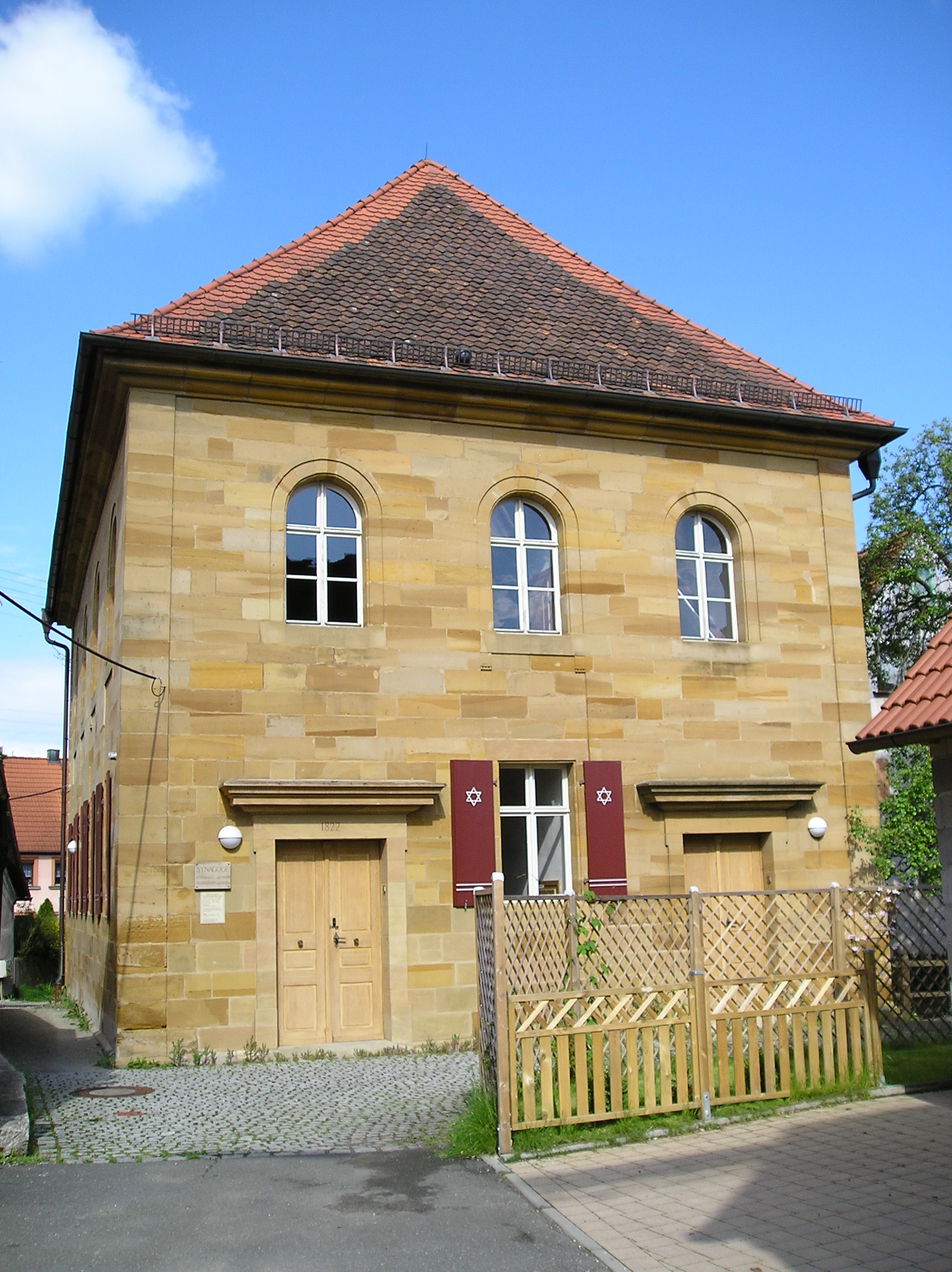
Ermreuth Synagogue

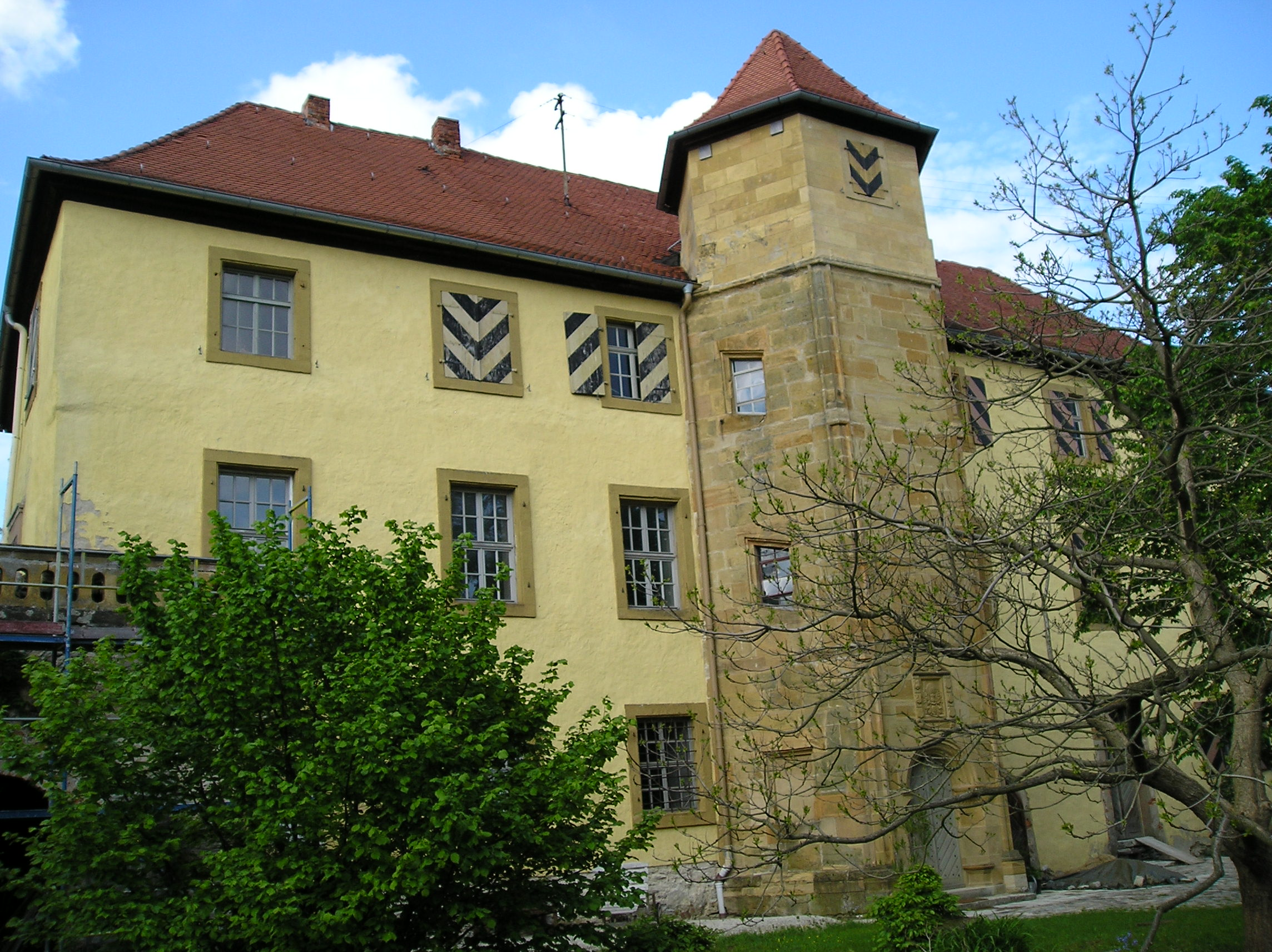
The front wall of the Ermreuth Castle

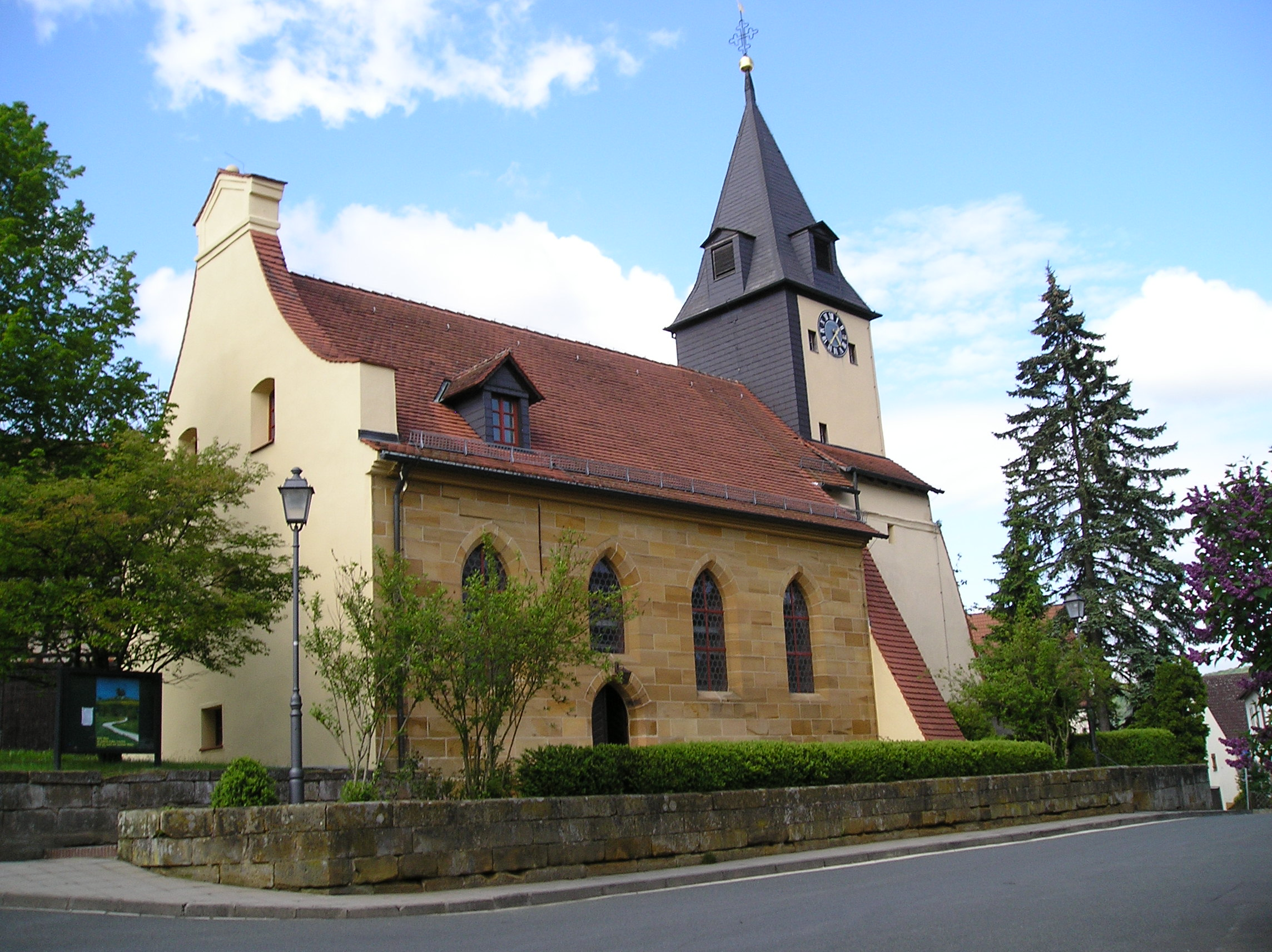
The village church in Ermreuth

=== Regular events ===
- On Good Friday, there is a famous and in this form very rare procession of holy figures
- On every second Saturday before St. Anna (July 26), everyone is invited to the local fair. Local clubs present themselves with their own stands and on a stage.
- The Neunkirchen church anniversary (Kirchweih or Kerwa) takes place on the weekend of the first Sunday in October.
- A Christmas market at St.-Michaels Church is always on the third weekend of Advent.

== Twin towns ==
- Deerlijk in Belgium
- Tótkomlós in Hungary
