= 12 Picks =

Greatest hits album by Ace Frehley
- Released: April 8, 1997
- Genre: Hard rock
- Length: 57:32
- Label: Megaforce
- Producer: Ace Frehley and John Regan

Ace Frehley chronology
Trouble Walkin' (1989)	12 Picks (1997)	Loaded Deck (1998)

Professional ratings
Review scores
Source	Rating
AllMusic	4/5 stars

12 Picks is a greatest hits album by American hard rock guitarist/singer Ace Frehley. Songs 7–12 were recorded live at the Hammersmith Odeon, London, England on March 19, 1988.

== Track listing ==
No.	Title	Writer(s)	Lead vocals	Length
1.	"Into the Night"	Russ Ballard	Ace Frehley	4:12
2.	"Words Are Not Enough"	Frehley, Jimmy Keneally	Frehley	3:25
3.	"Insane"	Frehley, Gene Moore	Frehley	3:46
4.	"Hide Your Heart"	Desmond Child, Holly Knight, Paul Stanley	Frehley	4:34
5.	"Trouble Walkin'"	Phil Brown, Bill Wray	Frehley	3:08
6.	"Rock Soldiers"	Frehley, Chip Taylor	Frehley	5:04
7.	"Rip It Out" (Live)	Frehley, Larry Kelly, Sue Kelly	Frehley	3:40
8.	"Breakout" (Live)	Eric Carr, Frehley, Richie Scarlet	Tod Howarth	3:30
9.	"Cold Gin" (Live)	Frehley	Frehley	6:48
10.	"Shock Me" (Live)	Frehley	Frehley	9:44
11.	"Rocket Ride" (Live)	Sean Delaney, Frehley	Frehley	4:54
12.	"Deuce" (Live)	Gene Simmons	Frehley	4:47
13.	"Calling to You" (Live; Japan Bonus Track)	Frehley, Tod Howarth, Kevin Russell, Jim McClarty	Howarth	5:15

== Personnel ==
- Ace Frehley – lead guitar on all tracks, lead vocals on tracks 1–7 and 9–12, backing vocals
- Tod Howarth – rhythm guitar on tracks 1–3 and 6–13, lead vocals on tracks 8 and 13, keyboards
- John Regan – bass guitar and backing vocals on all tracks
- Anton Fig – drums on tracks 1–2, 4 and 6
- Richie Scarlet – rhythm guitar and backing vocals on tracks 4–5
- Jamie Oldaker – drums on tracks 3 and all live tracks
- Sandy Slavin – drums on track 5
