= Greatest Hits Live (Ace Frehley album) =

Live album by Ace Frehley
- Released: January 24, 2006
- Recorded: 1987, 1988, 1997, 1998
- Genre: Hard rock
- Length: 60:00
- Label: Megaforce Records
- Producer: Eddie Kramer, Ace Frehley, John Regan

Ace Frehley chronology
Loaded Deck (1998)	Greatest Hits Live (2006)	Anomaly (2009)

Greatest Hits Live is a live album by Ace Frehley. The album contains ten live tracks and two studio recordings. Tracks 1–6, 8 and 10 were recorded in London, England. Tracks 7 and 9 were recorded in Chicago, Illinois. The final two studio recordings were outtakes from Frehley's previous greatest hits compilation, Loaded Deck.

Professional ratings
Review scores
Source	Rating
Allmusic	3.5/5 stars

== Track listing ==
No.	Title	Writer(s)	Lead vocals	Length
1.	"Rip It Out"	Ace Frehley, Larry Kelly, Sue Kelly	Frehley	3:42
2.	"Breakout"	Frehley, Eric Carr, Richie Scarlet	Tod Howarth	3:29
3.	"Cold Gin"	Frehley	Frehley	6:48
4.	"Shock Me"	Frehley	Frehley	9:43
5.	"Rocket Ride"	Frehley, Sean Delaney	Frehley	4:55
6.	"Deuce"	Gene Simmons	Frehley	4:20
7.	"Stranger in a Strange Land"	Frehley	Frehley	4:10
8.	"Separate"	Frehley, John Regan	Frehley	4:58
9.	"New York Groove"	Russ Ballard	Frehley	4:54
10.	"Rock Soldiers"	Frehley, Chip Taylor	Frehley	7:23
11.	"One Plus One (Studio Track)"	Anton Fig, Phil Galdstone	Frehley	3:25
12.	"Give It to Me Anyway (Studio Track)"	Frehley, Arthur Stead, Scarlett	Scarlett	4:18

== Personnel ==
- Ace Frehley - guitar, vocals, producer
- John Regan - bass, vocals
- Tod Howarth - guitar, vocals
- Jamie Oldaker - drums, percussion
- Anton Fig - drums, percussion
- Frank Simms - vocals
- David Spinner - vocals
- Richie Scarlet - guitar, vocals
- Peter Criss - drums, percussion
- Sebastian Bach - vocals
- Rachel Bolan - vocals
- Peppy Castro - vocals
- Al Frisch - vocals
- Pat Sommers - vocals
- Eddie Kramer - producer, mixer
- David Cook - mixer
- John Regan - mixer
