= Live+1 =

EP by Frehley's Comet
- Released: February 2, 1988
- Recorded: September 4, 1987, with Metro Mobile Location Recording
- Venue: Aragon Ballroom, Chicago, Illinois
- Genre: Hard rock; glam metal
- Length: 24:49
- Label: Atlantic; Megaforce
- Producer: Frehley's Comet; Eddie Kramer; Scott Mabuchi; (studio track)

Frehley's Comet chronology
| Frehley's Comet (1987) | Live+1 (1988) | Second Sighting (1988) |

Professional ratings
Review scores
| Source | Rating |
|---|---|
| AllMusic | 3/5 stars |
| Collector's Guide to Heavy Metal | 7/10 |

Live+1 is a 1988 EP by American hard rock band Frehley's Comet. It was meant to serve as a stopgap until the release of the group's second studio album, Second Sighting. The first four songs were recorded live at the Aragon Ballroom in Chicago on September 4, 1987. The last song, "Words Are Not Enough", is a shorter version of a demo recording the group made in 1985.

== Contemporary reviews ==
In the May 1988 issue of Circus magazine, music critic Paul Gallotta reviewed the hybrid live-studio release, describing it as a well-crafted stopgap measure designed to satisfy the frontman's fanbase during the preparation of his next full-length project. The publication noted that the tracklist featured four concert recordings—including a powerful cover version of Kiss's "Rocket Ride"—alongside a newly recorded studio track, "Words Are Not Enough." Gallotta observed that the overall material delivered exactly what audiences anticipated from the musician, characterizing it as solid, accessible hard rock. Furthermore, the reviewer highlighted the new studio composition as a significant surprise, arguing that its infectious commercial appeal possessed the potential to secure a position on the singles charts.

== Track listing ==
| No. | Title | Writer(s) | Lead vocals | Length |
|---|---|---|---|---|
| 1. | "Rip It Out" | Ace Frehley, Larry Kelly, Sue Kelly | Ace Frehley | 4:34 |
| 2. | "Breakout" | Frehley, Eric Carr, Richie Scarlet | Tod Howarth | 7:32 |
| 3. | "Something Moved" | Tod Howarth | Howarth | 3:57 |
| 4. | "Rocket Ride" | Frehley, Sean Delaney | Frehley | 4:34 |
| 5. | "Words Are Not Enough" (studio track) | Frehley, Jimmy Keneally | Frehley | 3:25 |

== Personnel ==
Frehley's Comet

- Ace Frehley – guitars, lead and backing vocals
- Tod Howarth – guitars, keyboards, lead and backing vocals
- John Regan – bass guitar and backing vocals
- Anton Fig – drums and percussion

Production

- Andy Johns – engineer
- Isa Helderman, Kathy Yore, Mark Harder, Timothy R. Powell – assistant engineers
- Scott Mabuchi – mixing, producer on track 5
- Danny Mormando, Jeff Abigzer – mixing assistants
- Eddie Kramer – producer on track 5
- Dennis King – mastering

== Charts ==
| Chart (1988) | Peak position |
|---|---|
| US Billboard 200 | 84 |
