= John Regan (bassist) =

American musician (1951–2023)

- John Regan in 1994

Background information
- Born: John Michael Regan; October 28, 1951; Poughkeepsie, New York, U.S.
- Died: April 7, 2023 (aged 71) Wappingers Falls, New York, U.S
- Genres: Hard rock; glam metal; pop rock
- Occupation: Musician
- Instrument: Bass Guitar
- Years active: 1964–2023
- Formerly of: Frehley's Comet; Four By Fate

John Michael Regan (October 28, 1951 – April 7, 2023) was an American musician, songwriter, producer, and bassist. He is notable for having been a member of ex-Kiss guitarist Ace Frehley's band Frehley's Comet from 1984 to 1990 and recorded and performed with Peter Frampton from 1979 to 2011. He also recorded with John Waite, The Rolling Stones, Stephen Stills, Dave Edmunds, Robin Trower, Scandal, Billy Idol, David Bowie, and David Lee Roth. He lived in Wappingers Falls, New York.

== Life and career ==
Regan was born in Poughkeepsie, New York, on October 28, 1951. In the early 1990s, Regan was a parks commissioner for the village of Wappingers Falls. In 2006, Peter Frampton played outdoors in Wappingers Falls with Regan for local residents.

Beginning in 2014, he co-hosted a Sunday morning radio show called Cafe Italia on 1450AM WKIP out of Poughkeepsie. "We kicked around the possibility of a weekly radio program that focused on these timeless artists, their connection to Italian music and culture, and generally a show that would pay homage to the songs that are the "soundtrack" to many of our lives."

Regan was part of the band Four By Fate, which saw him reunite with former Frehley's Comet co-frontman Tod Howarth. They recorded an album together, Relentless (2016). Regan also toured with Howarth, Richie Scarlet, and Steve "Budgie" Werner (celebrating their shared history with Frehley's Comet/Ace Frehley Band), as "Return of the Comet" in 2019.

Regan died at his home in Wappingers Falls, New York, on April 7, 2023, at the age of 71.

== Partial discography ==
=== Bass ===
- Dancing in the Street (1985) - Bowie & Jagger (Single version)
- Dirty Work (1986) ~ The Rolling Stones
- Whiplash Smile (1986) - Billy Idol
- Rover's Return(1987) - John Waite
- Hide Your Heart (1988) - Bonnie Tyler
- Not Fakin' It (1989) - Michael Monroe
- Black Tie White Noise (1993) - David Bowie
- Your Filthy Little Mouth (1994) - David Lee Roth
- Relentless (2016) - Four By Fate

Ace Frehley

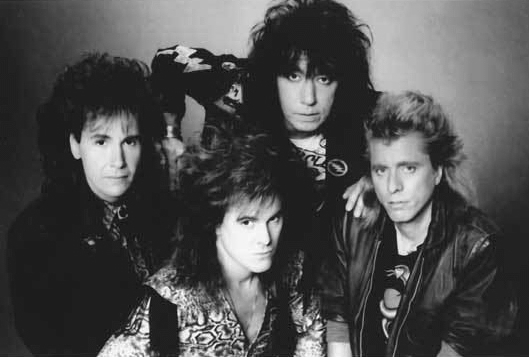
John Regan(far left) in 1988 as a member of Frehley's Comet

- Frehley's Comet (1987)
- Second Sighting (1988)
- Live+1 (1988)
- Trouble Walkin' (1989)
- 12 Picks (1997)
- Loaded Deck (1998)
- Greatest Hits Live (2006)

Peter Frampton

- Rise Up (1980)
- Breaking All the Rules (1981)
- Art of Control (1982)
- Frampton Comes Alive 2 - 1995

Richie Scarlet

- The Catman & The Emperor (2020)

Four By Fate

- Relentless (2016)

=== Production ===
- Blue, Dressed in Black (2000) - Eric Stuart Band

Ace Frehley

- Trouble Walkin' (1989)
- 12 Picks (1997)
- Loaded Deck (1998)
- Greatest Hits Live (Ace Frehley album) (2006)
