= Loaded Deck =

Compilation album by Ace Frehley
- Released: January 20, 1998
- Recorded: 1987–1997
- Genre: Hard rock
- Length: 58:29
- Label: Megaforce Records
- Producers: John Regan, Ace Frehley

Ace Frehley chronology
12 Picks (1997)	Loaded Deck (1998)	Greatest Hits Live (2006)

Loaded Deck is a greatest hits compilation of Ace Frehley's solo career released in 1997, after the widespread Kiss reunion tour. It includes some of Frehley's greatest hits such as "New York Groove", "Rock Soldiers", and a cover of The Move's "Do Ya".

Professional ratings
Review scores
Source	Rating
Allmusic	2.5/5 stars

== Track listing ==
No.	Title	Writer(s)	Lead vocals	Length
1.	"One Plus One"	Anton Fig, Phil Galdston	Ace Frehley	3:25
2.	"Give It to Me Anyway"	Frehley, Richie Scarlet, Arthur Stead	Richie Scarlet	4:16
3.	"Do Ya"	Jeff Lynne	Frehley	3:48
4.	"It's Over Now"	Tod Howarth	Howarth	4:41
5.	"Shot Full of Rock"	Frehley, Scarlet	Frehley	4:46
6.	"Stranger in a Strange Land" (live)	Frehley	Frehley	4:46
7.	"Separate" (live)	Frehley, John Regan	Frehley	4:58
8.	"New York Groove" (live)	Russ Ballard	Frehley	4:54
9.	"Rock Soldiers" (live)	Frehley, Chip Taylor	Frehley	7:22
10.	"Remember Me" (live)	Frehley, Carter Cathcart	Frehley	4:55
11.	"Fractured Too"	Frehley, Regan	instrumental	4:09
12.	"Fractured III"	Frehley, Regan	instrumental	6:48
13.	"Shock Me" (live, Japan bonus track)	Frehley	Frehley	9:10
