= Ace Frehley =

American guitarist (1951–2025)

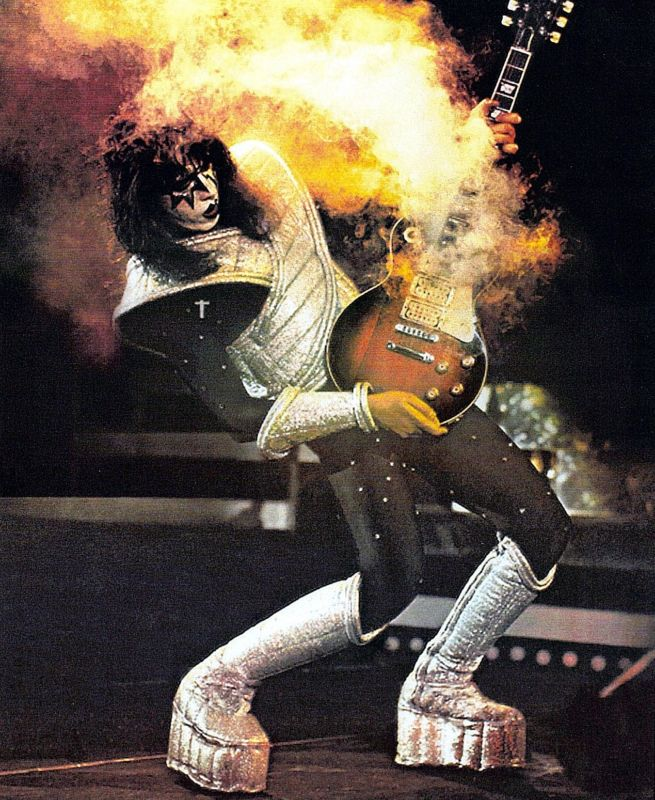
- Frehley with Kiss in 1977

Background information
- Also known as: Space Ace, SpaceMan
- Born: Paul Daniel Frehley; April 27, 1951; The Bronx, New York City, U.S.
- Died: October 16, 2025 (aged 74) Morristown, New Jersey, U.S.
- Genres: Hard rock; heavy metal
- Occupation: Musician
- Instruments: Guitar; vocals
- Years active: 1964–2025
- Formerly of: Kiss; Frehley's Comet
- Website: acefrehley.com

Paul Daniel "Ace" Frehley (/freɪliː/, FRAY-lee; April 27, 1951 – October 16, 2025) was an American musician. He was the original lead guitarist, an occasional vocalist, and a founding member of the hard rock band Kiss. He invented the persona of the Spaceman (a.k.a. Space Ace) and originally played with the group from its inception in 1973 until his departure in 1982, before later rejoining in 1996 until his final departure in 2002.

After leaving Kiss in 1982, Frehley formed his own band, Frehley's Comet, and released two albums with the group. He subsequently embarked on a solo career, which was put on hold when he rejoined Kiss in 1996 for a reunion tour. Frehley's second tenure with Kiss lasted until 2002, when he left at the conclusion of what was originally intended to be the band's farewell tour. Frehley's solo releases were commercially successful, with his 1978 debut studio album achieving platinum status. His most recent solo studio album, 10,000 Volts, was released in 2024. Frehley died in October 2025 after complications from a fall at his home.

Frehley was noted for his aggressive, atmospheric, and melodic guitar playing, and for the use of many "special effects" guitars, including a Gibson Les Paul guitar that emitted smoke from its DiMarzio neck humbucker pickup and produced spinning pyrotechnics and a custom Les Paul that emitted light based on the tempo of a song. Frehley was inducted into the Rock and Roll Hall of Fame in 2014 as a member of Kiss. Guitar World magazine ranked him among the greatest metal guitarists of all time.

== Early life, family and education ==
Paul Daniel Frehley was born on April 27, 1951, in The Bronx, New York City, the youngest of three children of Esther Anna (Hecht) and Carl Daniel 'Friebely' Frehley, an electrical engineer. His father, the son of Dutch immigrants, was from Pennsylvania. His mother was originally from North Carolina and of German and Cherokee descent.

External videos
- Kiss Legend Ace Frehley – Wikipedia: Fact or Fiction? (Part 1), Loudwire
- Kiss Legend Ace Frehley – Wikipedia: Fact or Fiction? (Part 2), Loudwire
- Kiss Legend Ace Frehley – Wikipedia: Fact or Fiction? (Part 3), Loudwire

The Frehleys were a musical family, and when he received an electric guitar as a Christmas present in 1964, Paul immersed himself in learning the instrument. "I never went to music school; I never took a guitar lesson, but everybody in my family plays an instrument. My mother and father both played piano, his father was the church organist, and my brother and sister both played piano and acoustic guitar." He was always surrounded by music, and started playing guitar at age 13. Jimi Hendrix, Albert Lee, Buddy Guy, Jeff Beck, B. B. King, Led Zeppelin, the Rolling Stones and The Who were his main influences.

Frehley had a troubled childhood. He joined a local street gang at age 13, although his interest in the gang waned as his interest in music grew. He was expelled from several high schools before eventually dropping out altogether. During that time he gained the nickname "Ace" because his friends believed that he was "a real ace" with his ability to get dates. Even though he dropped out of high school after his band Cathedral started getting gigs, his girlfriend and family convinced him to return to school, finish and get his diploma, which he did.

He described watching The Who and Cream live as a teenager as confirming his love of music as a professional pursuit, which he claimed "saved" him by deterring him from gang life.

== Music career ==
Frehley began playing in local bands during high school. At age 18, he worked as a roadie for Jimi Hendrix.

=== Early career ===
Frehley's earliest bands included the Outrage, the Four Roses, King Kong, Honey (a cover band), the Magic People, and Molimo, who signed with and recorded for RCA Records. When Frehley's later band, Cathedral, began getting paying gigs, he dropped out of high school, later returning to earn his diploma. After graduation, Frehley held a string of short-term jobs, including mail carrier, furniture deliverer, messenger, taxi driver, and liquor store delivery person.

=== Kiss ===
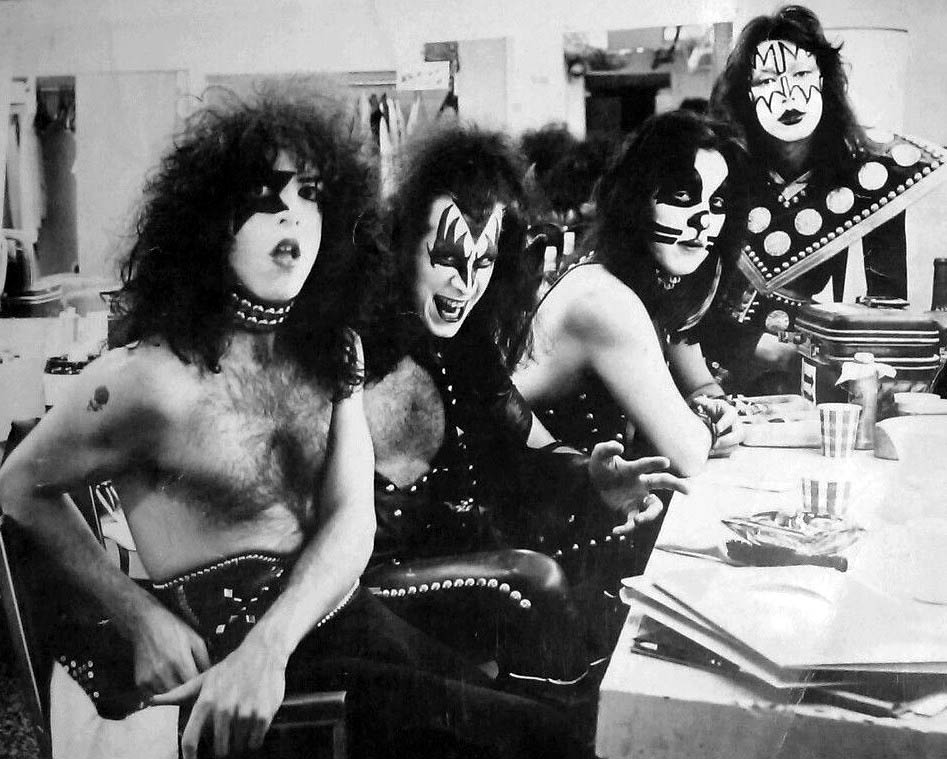
(L-R): Paul Stanley, Gene Simmons, Peter Criss, and Frehley in 1975

Frehley spent the early 1970s in a series of local bands including one called Molimo who recorded half an album for RCA in 1971. In late 1972, his friend, Chris Cassone, spotted an advertisement for a lead guitarist in The Village Voice and showed the ad to Frehley. Frehley went to 10 East 23rd Street above the Live Bait Bar and auditioned for Paul Stanley (rhythm guitar), Gene Simmons (bass guitar), and Peter Criss (drums). Frehley showed up wearing one red and one orange sneaker and was less than impressive visually, but the band liked what they heard from his playing. About three weeks later the band named Frehley as their lead guitarist. By January 1973 the band came up with the name Kiss. Frehley designed the band's double-lightning-bolt logo, which was polished up by Stanley. The band quickly decided to paint their faces for live performances and Frehley decided to start painting silver stars on his eyes. When the group eventually decided to adopt stage personas to match their makeup and costumes, Frehley became Space Ace. Later his stage persona was also known as The Spaceman. Frehley stated that this persona was inspired by his interest in science fiction and space travel.

"The Spaceman" was the make-up design used by Frehley during his years with Kiss (1973–1982, 1996–2002).

While Kiss spent their early days rehearsing and playing in empty clubs, Frehley worked as a part-time cab driver to pay bills. In September 1973, Kiss began to be managed by Bill Aucoin, and Frehley quit his cabbie job.

Kiss released their debut album, Kiss, in February 1974 – Frehley was credited for writing two songs, "Love Theme from Kiss" (the only song co-written by the four original members) and a fan classic, "Cold Gin". Due to Frehley's lack of confidence in his own singing voice, however, Simmons performed the vocals. Frehley wrote or co-wrote several of the band's songs over the next few years but did not record vocals on a song until "Shock Me" (inspired by his near-electrocution during a concert in Lakeland, Florida), which appeared on 1977's Love Gun.

As lead guitarist, Frehley was known for his frenetic, atmospheric playing, becoming one of the most popular guitarists in the 1970s and spawning a generation of new players. Frehley stated in the book Kiss: Behind the Mask that many guitarists have told him his playing on 1975's hit Alive! prompted them to pick up the instrument. Frehley is well recognized for having used Gibson Les Paul guitars, including his trademarked model conversion Les Paul Custom (that was designed and implemented by John Elder Robison, known as "Ampie", an audio engineer working with the band), which filled the stage with smoke during his live guitar solo.

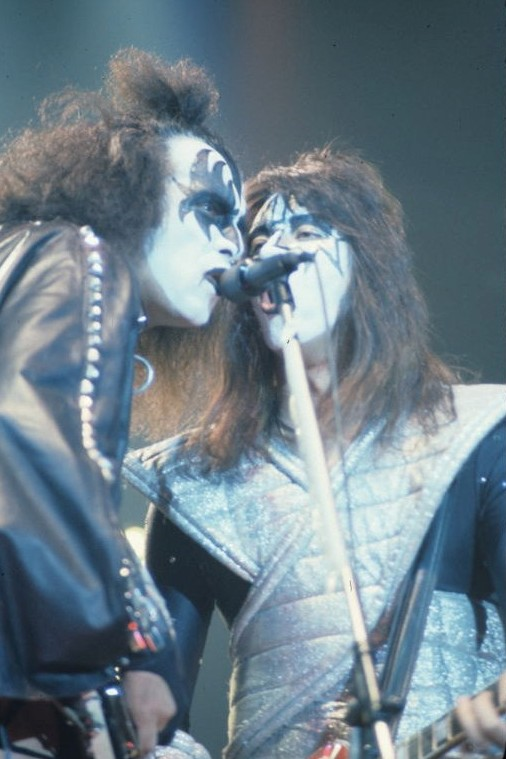
Frehley (right) and Gene Simmons during the Alive II Tour in 1978

Along with the three other Kiss members, Frehley released an eponymous solo album in 1978. His was the bestselling of the four, and the album's lone single—the Russ Ballard-written "New York Groove", originally recorded by Hello—reached the Top 20 in the United States. His songwriting presence within the group increased in 1979. He contributed three songs for 1979's Dynasty and three for 1980's Unmasked. While this was not the most commercially successful time for Kiss in the United States, the band was beginning to take off in other countries (mostly in Australia, where Dynasty and Unmasked are their biggest-selling albums). In 1981, a star was named after Frehley in the International Star Registry.

Even as his songwriting role within Kiss was increasing, Frehley found himself increasingly at odds with the musical direction of the band. After Peter Criss was voted out of Kiss in 1980, Frehley was often outvoted 2–1 in band decisions, as replacement drummer Eric Carr was not a partner in Kiss and had no vote. Frehley's participation in the recording of 1981's Music from "The Elder" was far more limited than with previous albums. This was in large part due to his unhappiness with the band's decision to create a concept album rather than a straightforward rock album.

By 1982, Frehley decided he wanted to leave the group, declining to sign a $15 million contract. He would later detail that “We were just constantly busy, and the drugs and the alcohol and all the partying in conjunction with that type of schedule just started to get to me. By the early ‘80s I just wanted to jump off the roller coaster because I thought I was going to crash.” He appeared on the covers for the 1982 releases Killers and Creatures of the Night, but he had no involvement with Killers, and minimal (no musical) input on Creatures of the Night. Frehley's last appearances with the band were in the music video for "I Love It Loud", a series of European promotional appearances in November 1982, and a band interview with MTV promoting their 10th anniversary world tour.

=== Solo career/Frehley's Comet ===
In December 1982, Kiss began the Creatures of the Night tour without Frehley: he was replaced by Vinnie Vincent. Frehley retained a one-quarter share in the Kiss partnership until 1985, however. He received one-quarter of the profits for both Lick It Up and Animalize although he had no involvement with either record. In 1984, Frehley began his post-Kiss solo career by assembling a band that included, among others, drummer Anton Fig (who had performed on Frehley's 1978 solo album and on two Kiss albums). Bassist John Regan (who had worked with Peter Frampton), whom Frehley met in 1980, was also an original member of the band as was vocalist/guitarist Richie Scarlet and keyboardist Arthur Stead. The group, whose name alternated between 'Ace Frehley' and Frehley's Comet, recorded a series of demos throughout 1984 and 1985. The band performed their first ever live show at S.I.R. Studios in New York City on November 30, 1984, and played a handful of shows in the Northeast United States in March 1985.

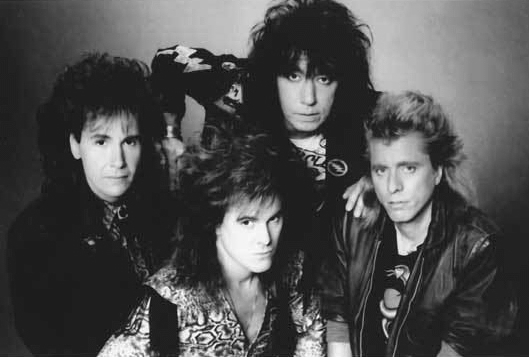
Frehley's Comet in 1988. L-R: John Regan, Tod Howarth, Frehley (on top), Jamie Oldaker

After a few unsuccessful attempts at securing a recording contract, the group eventually signed to Megaforce Records and released their first album, Frehley's Comet, on July 7, 1987. The album was co-produced by Eddie Kramer, who had produced not only a number of Kiss albums, but Frehley's 1978 album and some of his 1984–85 demos. Fig, now being the in-studio drummer for David Letterman's late-night television show, performed on the album but was unable to maintain a permanent commitment to touring. He played on the 1987 tour in the United States when Frehley's band played a double bill with Y&T, and White Lion opening the shows. By the time the band began recording this album, Scarlet had left the group to pursue other projects and was replaced by Tod Howarth. In addition, at some point between the initial Frehley's Comet shows in 1984–85 and their signing to Megaforce, the band had become a four-piece, with Stead no longer playing with the group.

Frehley's Comet, a mixture of hard rock and pop metal, was a successful return to the music scene for Frehley. The album peaked at No. 43 on the Billboard 200 (selling nearly 500,000 copies), and the single, a Russ Ballard cover "Into the Night", reached No. 27 on the Mainstream Rock Tracks chart. "Rock Soldiers" was an autobiographic song, written partially about Frehley's April 1982 police chase in White Plains, New York while driving a DeLorean with his friend. The music video for "Rock Soldiers" received moderate airplay on MTV, particularly on Headbangers Ball.

Despite the positive reviews and healthy album sales of Frehley's Comet, Frehley was unable to maintain much commercial momentum. Two 1988 Frehley's Comet albums—the live EP Live+1 and second studio album Second Sighting peaked at No. 84 and No. 81, respectively. A pair of tours in support of Alice Cooper and Iron Maiden ended prematurely, with the band claiming lack of payment in both cases. In order to reverse his band's declining commercial fortunes, Frehley dropped the Frehley's Comet moniker and issued 1989's Trouble Walkin' under his own name. Tod Howarth and Jamie Oldaker also decided to leave before recording started on the album, and were replaced by Scarlet and Sandy Slavin. Despite the return to a more traditional hard rock style, Trouble Walkin' continued the pattern of declining sales, and peaked at No. 102. After the tour for Trouble Walkin' ended prematurely with John Regan resigning after an April 1990 show in Las Vegas, Frehley did not perform live for two years, until July 1992.

One notable aspect of Trouble Walkin' was the guest appearance of Peter Criss, who provided backing vocals on several tracks, along with Sebastian Bach and other members of Skid Row. It was the first time Criss and Frehley had performed together on an album since Kiss' 1979 album, Dynasty, although Criss had shown up briefly at a Frehley's Comet show in Los Angeles in 1987, playing drums on a final encore of "Deuce". Frehley would return the favor by playing solos on Peter Criss' Cat 1 album on TNT Records, released in 1994. In contrast to the somewhat adversarial relationship Frehley had with Kiss (particularly Gene Simmons) throughout the 1980s, he and Criss had maintained good ties during the decade. In June 1995, Frehley's and Criss' bands embarked on the "Bad Boys Tour" with Scarlet on guitar, marking the end of Frehley's solo band for several years as Kiss shortly thereafter reunited and began touring together again.

=== Reunion with Kiss (1996–2002) ===
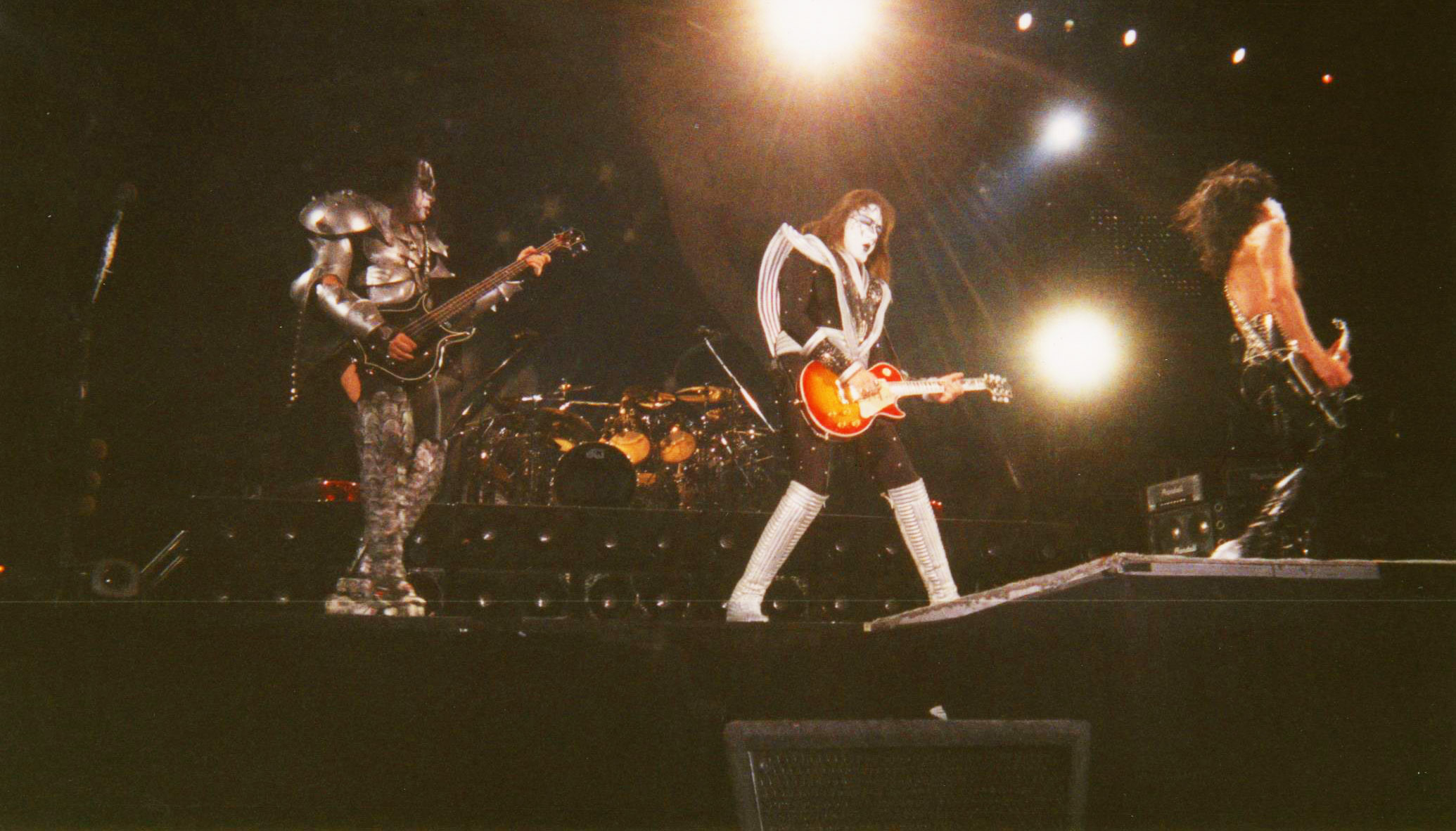
Frehley performing with Kiss in 1999

In 1996, Frehley rejoined Kiss for a successful reunion tour, on which all four original members of the band performed live for the first time since original drummer Peter Criss' departure in 1980. After the tour, they announced that the original lineup would return to the studio to record a new album. The resulting record, Psycho Circus, was promoted with a successful world tour, but it was later revealed that Frehley's and Criss' involvement on it was minimal. "Into The Void" and "You Wanted The Best" were Frehley's lone contributions to the record, with the former believed to be the only song that all four original members performed on. After completing the "Farewell Tour" with Kiss in late 2001, he would leave the band and resume his solo career.

=== Return to solo career (2003–2025) ===
In 2006, Frehley performed Kiss' "God of Thunder" with Rob Zombie, Slash, Gilby Clarke, Scott Ian, and Tommy Lee at the VH1 Rock Honors in Las Vegas on May 25, 2006.

In October 2018, Frehley and Bruce Kulick reunited with Kiss on the Kiss Kruise. The six musicians performed "2,000 Man", "New York Groove", "Nothin' to Lose", and "Rock and Roll All Nite". This was the first time Frehley and the band had performed together since 2002 for the closing ceremonies of the 2002 Winter Olympics and Kulick's first time performing with the band live since his departure in 1996.

Frehley did not participate in Kiss' final tour, which began on January 31, 2019, in Vancouver, British Columbia. Stanley and Simmons did not rule out the possibility of Frehley and Peter Criss making appearances during the final tour, with Stanley stating that he was "open to the idea". Simmons later invited Frehley to perform encores with the band for their final tour, but Frehley turned down the invitation, also ruling out the possibility of performing at the band's final show and expressing doubt that the band would stop touring. In June 2022, Simmons reportedly told the Finnish Chaoszine that he and Stanley had met with Frehley to try to convince him to make guest appearances with the band but that Frehley was making demands (regarding his makeup and having guitarist Tommy Thayer not play encores) that could not be satisfied. It was announced on December 15, 2020, that a Kiss biopic was in the works, with hopes to release it on time with the band's final concert. Deadline has reported that Netflix has nearly finalized a deal to produce the Kiss biopic titled Shout it Out Loud, which will be released in 2026. The film will be made with close cooperation from both Simmons and Stanley, and will focus on the formative years of the band.

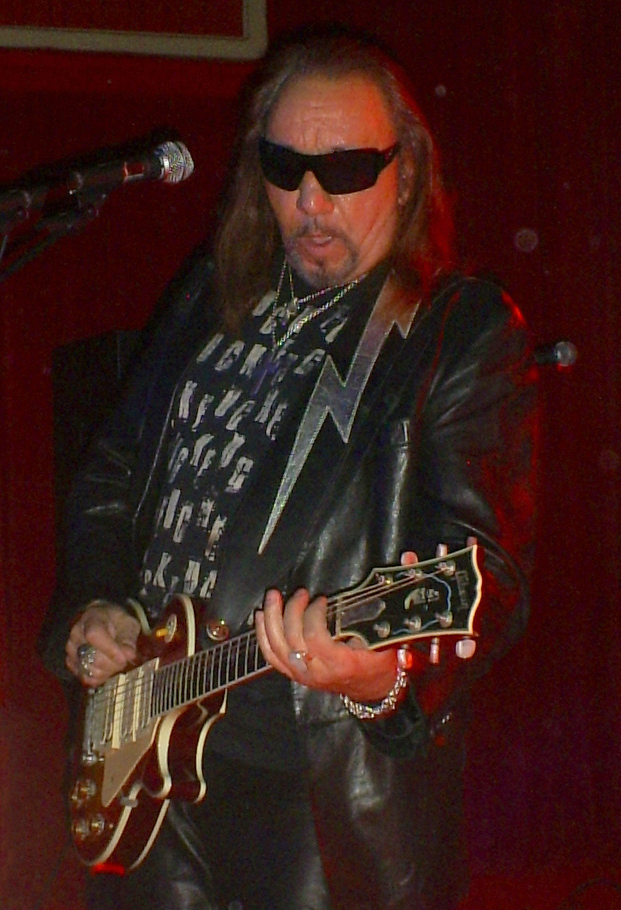
Frehley performing in 2011

After the announcement of the biopic, a two-part documentary on the band titled Biography: Kisstory was also announced and aired on A&E on both June 27 and 28, 2021, with an exclusive live performance following after its debut at the Tribeca Film Festival on June 11, 2021. Simmons claimed (in June 2022 when being interviewed by Chaoszine) that he and Stanley had invited Frehley and Criss to participate in the documentary but that Frehley and Criss told Simmons that "they might do it if they have complete control of the edit. I said, 'We can't do that, because even we don't have that. But I won't control what you say; you can say whatever you want.' The answer is no—both of them."

In the June 2022 interview with Chaoszine, Simmons also discussed Frehley and Criss' health and a Kiss fan convention in May 2022, Nashville, Tennessee, called the "Creatures Fest". Frehley, Criss, Vinnie Vincent, and Bruce Kulick all performed at the event. Criss joined Frehley for part of Frehley's set, and both Kulick and Frehley joined Vincent for part of his set. Simmons was asked if he had seen fan footage from the event, to which he responded "Somebody showed me about 30 seconds, yeah. It was very sad. I felt sad for Peter [Criss]…" He elaborated about Criss' health, claiming that "When I called to invite Peter to be in the documentary, his health isn't what it should be. I don't wanna get too specific because it's part of his private life. But no, physically, he wouldn't be able to do it. Neither would Ace." With regards to Frehley, Simmons said that "[he cared] about Ace [Frehley], but he's not in shape—he can't play that way and doesn't have the physical stamina to do that" and he felt that Frehley and Criss' actions had resulted in their poor relationship with himself and Stanley.

Shortly before Kiss' final two shows, and after the end of the tour, Frehley stated that he was not opposed to appearing at the final concerts in New York City. He also stated that he would have accepted such an offer, even if both he and Thayer were wearing his "Spaceman" makeup, for a $250,000 payment for each of the two final shows. Frehley also denied that he and Criss had been invited, claiming that "[Stanley and Simmons] just said that to sell tickets." 10,000 Volts was released in 2024, debuting at No. 72 on the Billboard 200 with first week sales of 13,000 units. The album has also topped both the Billboard Hard Music and Rock Album Charts. Additionally, it came in at No. 2 on the Independent Chart, No. 3 on the Internet Albums Charts, and No. 4 on the Vinyl, Album Sales, and Current Album Sales Charts. The album has charted internationally. Frehley's next album, Origins Vol. 3, was planned for release in 2025.

On December 7, 2025, Frehley was posthumously among the former Kiss band members who received a 2025 Kennedy Center Honors, with former Kiss bandmates Paul Stanley and Peter Criss openly paying tribute to him shortly before the event in interviews with People.

== Death ==
On September 25, 2025, Frehley suffered a minor fall in his home studio and was forced to cancel tour dates after being hospitalized. One week later on October 2, he fell down a flight of stairs at his home where he severely injured his head and was rushed to the hospital. Two weeks later on October 16, 2025, TMZ reported that Frehley was on life support with a ventilator and had brain bleeding. His family considered removing him from life support after his health failed to improve. Frehley died in Morristown, New Jersey, at the age of 74, several hours after life support was stopped.

His former Kiss bandmates paid tribute to him. In a joint statement, Paul Stanley and Gene Simmons described Frehley as an "essential and irreplaceable rock soldier during some of the most formative foundational chapters of the band and its history." Peter Criss stated that "Ace influenced and touched the hearts of millions of people."

In accordance with his wishes, Frehley was buried near his parents at Woodlawn Cemetery following a private memorial service at Sinatra Memorial Home in Yonkers on October 21. The service was attended by a small group of family and friends, including the three remaining original members of Kiss.

== Personal life ==
Frehley was married to Jeanette Trerotola from 1976 until his death, but they legally separated in 1985. The couple had a daughter, Monique, in 1980. During the 2000s and 2010s Frehley was in a relationship with musician Rachael Gordon, who contributed lyrics to his 2014 album Space Invader, and he in turn produced her album Paper Doll. After their breakup in 2019, Gordon filed a domestic violence restraining order against Frehley in San Diego County. His last relationship was with Lara Cove, whom he met in a Kiss fan convention in 2018, and would move in with her in New Jersey until they split up in 2024.

Frehley started drinking at the age of 13, and struggled with alcoholism and substance abuse for decades. He only became sober in 2006, after a worrying call from his daughter prompted Frehley to seek the help of his Alcoholics Anonymous sponsor.

Frehley released his autobiography, No Regrets – A Rock 'N' Roll Memoir, on November 1, 2011. The autobiography was authored by Frehley, Joe Layden, and John Ostrosky, and published through Gallery Books, a subdivision of Simon & Schuster. The book entered The New York Times Best Seller list in the hardcover non-fiction category at No. 10.

== Technique ==
In a 2009 interview with Rock N Roll Experience Magazine, Frehley said, "I'm an anomaly, I'm an un-schooled musician, I don't know how to read music, but I'm one of the most famous guitar players in the world, so go figure."

"I play guitar in such an unorthodox way," he told Guitar World in 1996. "I've never taken a guitar lesson. One of our assistants brought it to my attention a few months ago that, sometimes, when I play chords, my thumb is on the fretted side of the neck. I have no idea why or how I do it, but I do." Paul Stanley added, "I remember a time early on when Ace and I would play, and I would do vibrato with my hand, and Ace would get vibrato by shaking his whole arm against the neck of the guitar [laughs]."

== Discography ==
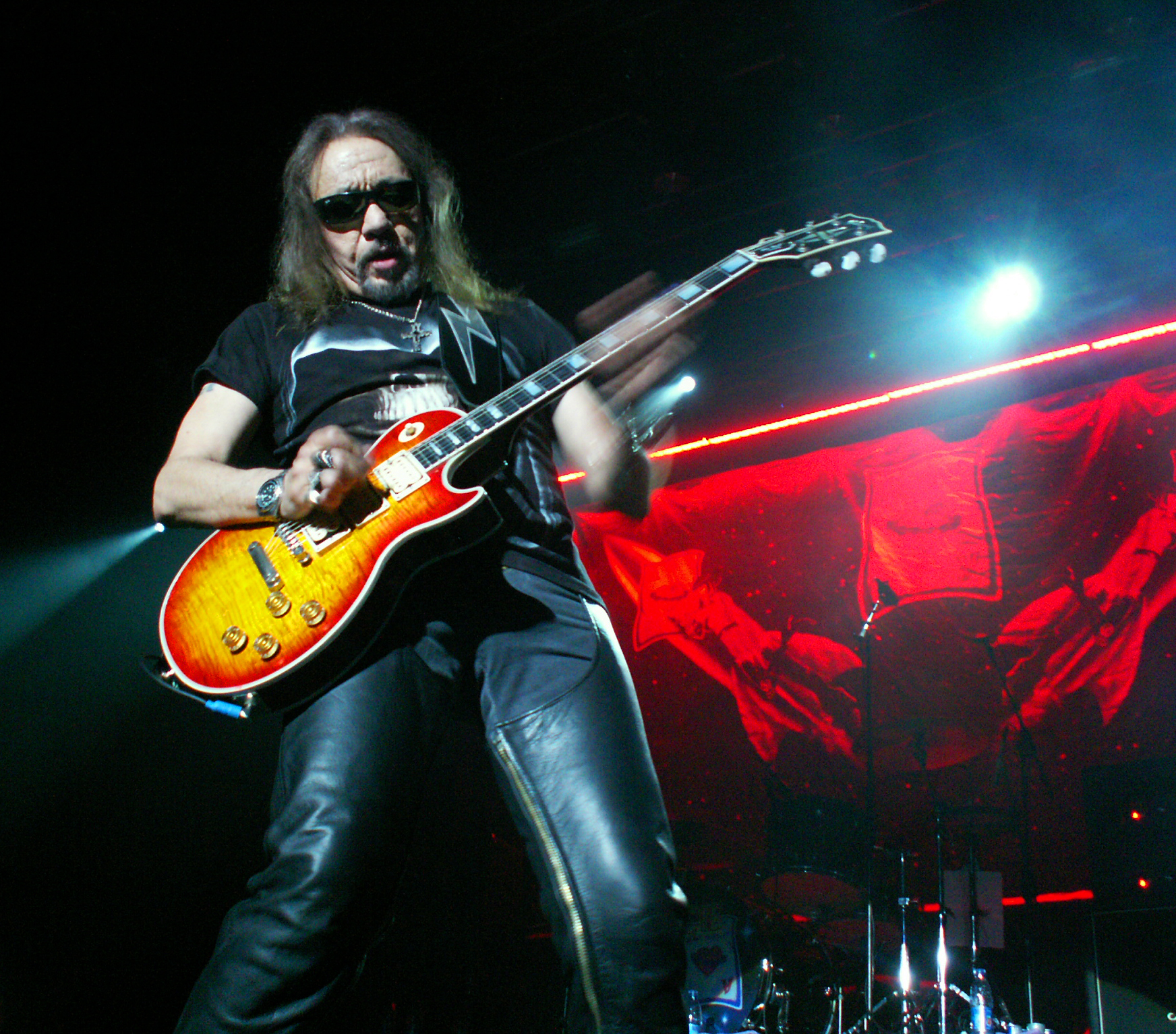
Frehley performing in 2008

=== Kiss ===
Studio albums

- Kiss (1974)
- Hotter than Hell (1974)
- Dressed to Kill (1975)
- Destroyer (1976)
- Rock and Roll Over (1976)
- Love Gun (1977)
- Dynasty (1979)
- Unmasked (1980)
- Music from "The Elder" (1981)
- Creatures of the Night (1982) (credited, but does not play)
- Psycho Circus (1998)

Live albums

- Alive! (1975)
- Alive II (1977)
- Kiss Unplugged (1996)
- You Wanted the Best, You Got the Best!! (1996)
- Alive! The Millennium Concert (2006)
- Off the Soundboard: Tokyo 2001 (2021)
- Off the Soundboard: Live at Donington 1996 (2022)
- Off the Soundboard: Des Moines 1977 (2022)
- Dressed to Kill 50th Anniversary Box Set (2025)
- Alive! 50th Anniversary Box Set (2025)
- Kiss Destroys Anaheim '76 (2026)

=== Solo and Frehley's Comet ===
Studio albums

- Ace Frehley (1978)
- Frehley's Comet (1987)
- Second Sighting (1988)
- Trouble Walkin' (1989)
- Anomaly (2009)
- Space Invader (2014)
- Origins Vol. 1 (2016)
- Spaceman (2018)
- Origins Vol. 2 (2020)
- 10,000 Volts (2024)

Live albums

- Live+1 (1988)
- Greatest Hits Live (2006)

Compilation albums

- 12 Picks (1997)
- Loaded Deck (1998)

Solo singles

- 1978: "New York Groove" – from the album Ace Frehley, his 1978 Kiss solo album. This is a cover of a song written by Russ Ballard, which was recorded by the band Hello, for their album Keeps Us Off the Streets, released in 1976.
- 1987: "Into the Night" – from the album Frehley's Comet.
- 1987: "Rock Soldiers" – from the album Frehley's Comet.
- 1988: "Words Are Not Enough" – (from the album Live+1).
- 1988: "Insane" – from the album Second Sighting.
- 1988: "It's Over Now" – from the album Second Sighting.
- 1989: "Do Ya" – from the album Trouble Walkin'. A cover of a Jeff Lynne song, written in 1971 whilst in The Move. The song was later recorded with Jeff Lynne's ELO, and included on their album A New World Record, released in 1976.
- 2009: "Outer Space" – from the album Anomaly.
- 2014: "Gimme a Feelin'" – from the album Space Invader.
- 2014: "The Joker" – from the album Space Invader. A cover of the Steve Miller song from his 1973 album The Joker.
- 2016: "White Room" – from the album Origins Vol. 1. A cover of the Cream song from their 1968 album Wheels of Fire.
- 2016: "Fire and Water" – from the album Origins Vol. 1. A cover of the Free song from their 1970 album, Fire and Water, featuring Paul Stanley of Kiss on vocals (promotional video).
- 2018: "Bronx Boy" – from the album Spaceman (released as a single on April 27, 2018, Ace Frehley's birthday).
- 2018: "Rockin' with the Boys" – from the album Spaceman. Released October 15, 2018 (promotional video).
- 2019: "Mission to Mars" – from the album Spaceman. Released May 28, 2019, with animated YouTube video.
- 2020: "Space Truckin'" – from the album Origins Vol. 2. A cover of the Deep Purple song. Released July 28, 2020, with animated YouTube video.
- 2020: "I'm Down" – from the album Origins Vol. 2. Released as a Visualizer on YouTube on September 3, 2020. The song "I'm Down" was originally recorded by the Beatles and was the B-side of their 1965 single "Help!".
- 2023: "10,000 Volts" – from the album 10,000 Volts. Released November 23, 2023 (promotional video).
- 2024: "Walkin' on the Moon" – from the album 10,000 Volts. Released February 2, 2024 (promotional video).
- 2024: "Cherry Medicine" – from the album 10,000 Volts. Released February 22, 2024 (promotional video).

=== Guest appearances ===
- "Eugene" – song on the 1981 self-titled album by Crazy Joe and the Variable Speed Band. Frehley co-wrote and co-produced the song with Joe Renda and played synth drums.
- "Bump and Grind" – song on the 1984 Wendy O. Williams album WOW, Frehley played lead guitar.
- "Bad Attitude", "Walk the Line", and "Blue Moon Over Brooklyn". Frehley played lead guitar on these three songs that feature on his former Kiss bandmate Peter Criss' album Cat 1 – the 1994 Criss album.
- "Cherokee Boogie" – song on the 1996 compilation album Smell the Fuzz: Guitars that Rule the World 2. The song was written, produced and engineered by Frehley, who also played all guitars on it.
- "Rocker Room Theme" – song on the 1998 Still Wicked album Something Wicked This Way Comes. Frehley played rhythm and lead guitar. CD also features Ron Leejack (Wicked Lester), Gordon G.G. Gebert, MaryAnn Scandiffio and Michael Sciotto.
- "Foxy Lady" – song on the 1998 ESP (Eric Singer Project) album Lost and Spaced. Frehley played lead guitar.
- "Freedom" – song on the 2000 Karl Cochran album Voodooland. Frehley played the guitar solo on the bonus demo version.
- Insanity of Life – on the 2002 Richie Scarlet album, Frehley played guitar on "Johnny's in Love" and lead guitar on "Too Far Gone", which he co-wrote with Scarlet.
- "Know Where You Go" – On the 2002 Anton Fig album Figments, Frehley played lead guitar.
- "Bad Choice" – on the 2005 Kathy Valentine album Light Years, Frehley played the lead guitar solos.
- "2,000 Man" (new version) – In 2005, Frehley played this new version on Eddie Trunk's Merry Kissmas special. Chris Cassone on acoustic guitar and harmony vocals. Chris suggested the song to Frehley for the Dynasty LP and recorded the demo at North Lake Sound.
- "God of Thunder" (live version) – In 2006, Frehley was a guest at the VH1 Rock Honors. He performed with a 'super-group' of Rob Zombie, Slash, Gilby Clarke, Scott Ian, and Tommy Lee. They performed the Kiss song "God of Thunder".
- "Black Diamond" (live version) – On June 25, 2008, Frehley appeared onstage at New York's Madison Square Garden with Pearl Jam for an encore performance of Kiss's "Black Diamond" sung by drummer Matt Cameron.
- "The Ride" – August 12, 2008 Black Pain Society by Jam Pain Society. Frehley played lead guitar on the song.
- "Highway to Hell" (live version) – On July 21, 2009, Frehley appeared on the Dark Horse Tour with members from each of the tour's participating bands in a rendition of AC/DC's "Highway to Hell". Frehley played lead guitar with Chad Kroeger of Nickelback on rhythm guitar and backing vocals—and Austin Winkler of Hinder and Jacoby Shaddix of Papa Roach sharing lead vocals.
- "Nothin' but a Good Time" – Frehley played lead guitar on a re-recorded version of this song, which features on Bret Michaels' 2013 album Jammin' with Friends. The song was originally recorded and released as a single by the rock band Poison.
- "Never Too Hot" – Ace recorded the lead for old friend, Chris Cassone, for his BBQ All Stars CD.
- "Rise Up (Back from the Grave)" – This is a collaboration between Kris Randall and Ace Frehley released in 2014. Written by Ace Frehley and Kris Randall. Co-produced by Kris Randall and Andy Bigan. Guitars/background vocals, Ace Frehley. Vocals/guitar/bass, Kris Randall; drums/bass, Andy Bigan.
- "Starman" – Ace Frehley played lead guitar on Joe Silva's cover of the David Bowie song, released in 2014. The recording also featured Anton Fig on drums and Will Lee on bass, both of whom featured on the Ace Frehley 1978 Kiss solo album.

== Filmography ==
- 1978: Kiss Meets the Phantom of the Park
- 1988: Frehley's Comet: Live + 4 (VHS)
- 1992: X-treme Close-Up
- 1994: Ace Frehley – Acevision Volume #1
- 1996: Kiss Unplugged
- 1998: Kiss: The Second Coming Documentary
- 1999: Detroit Rock City
- 2001: Family Guy: A Very Special Family Guy Freakin' Christmas
- 2004: Kiss Loves You
- 2005: Remedy
- 2006: Kissology Volume One: 1974–1977
- 2007: Kissology Volume Two: 1978–1991
- 2007: Kissology Volume Three: 1992–2000
- 2009: Let's Go Cobo (Documentary)
- 2009—2010: Metalocalypse: Dethhealth and Dethsiduals

=== Interviews ===
- Behind the Player: Ace Frehley DVD (2010)
- A Conversation with Ace Frehley on The Pods & Sods Network EM25 – Ace Frehley
- Ace Frickin’ Frehley (2023)

== Sources ==
- Giles, Jeff (July 10, 2014). "Ace Frehley Reveals 'Space Invader' Track Listing". Ultimate Classic Rock.
- Grow, Kory (May 29, 2014). "Hear Ace Frehley's Kiss-Like New 'Gimme a Feelin'' – Premiere". Rolling Stone.

Preceded by None	Lead guitarist of Kiss; 1973–1982	Succeeded by Vinnie Vincent
Preceded by Bruce Kulick	Lead guitarist of Kiss; 1996–2002	Succeeded by Tommy Thayer
