= Second Sighting =

Studio album by Frehley's Comet
- Released: May 24, 1988
- Recorded: 1988
- Studios: Mediasound, New York City
- Genre: Glam metal
- Length: 42:11
- Labels: Atlantic; Megaforce
- Producers: Frehley's Comet; Scott Mabuchi; Jon & Marsha Zazula; Eddie Trunk

Frehley's Comet chronology
Frehley's Comet (1987)	Second Sighting (1988)	Trouble Walkin' (1989)

Singles from Second Sighting
- 1. "It's Over Now" Released: 1988; 2. "Insane" Released: 1988

Professional ratings
Review scores
Source	Rating
AllMusic	2/5 stars
Collector's Guide to Heavy Metal	7/10

Second Sighting is the third solo album by Ace Frehley and the second and final to use the Frehley's Comet moniker. Due to Frehley's illness and substance abuse during the recording, Tod Howarth took a bigger role in singing and songwriting than on the previous album.

Second Sighting was recorded with new drummer Jamie Oldaker, who had previously worked with Bob Seger and Eric Clapton. He replaced Billy Ward, who was in the videos and part of the tour for the previous album replacing Anton Fig, who would return for 1989's Trouble Walkin'. This makes Second Sighting the only Frehley solo album or project (excluding compilations) to not feature Fig at this point.

"Dancin' with Danger" is a cover version of a song recorded by the Canadian band Streetheart, which had featured future Loverboy members Paul Dean and Matt Frenette. Although the songwriting credits list Frehley and Dana Strum, the music and lyrics are very similar to the original version.

"Insane" and "It's Over Now" were released as singles with corresponding music videos. Both singles failed to chart.

UK-based company Rock Candy Records reissued this album on CD in 2013.

== Track listing ==
No.	Title	Writer(s)	Lead vocals	Length
1.	"Insane"	Ace Frehley, Gene Moore	Frehley	3:45
2.	"Time Ain't Runnin' Out"	Tod Howarth	Howarth	3:52
3.	"Dancin' with Danger" (Streetheart cover)	Streetheart, Frehley, Dana Strum	Frehley	3:25
4.	"It's Over Now"	Howarth	Howarth	4:39
5.	"Loser in a Fight"	Howarth, John Regan	Frehley, Howarth	4:33
6.	"Juvenile Delinquent"	Frehley	Frehley	5:13
7.	"Fallen Angel"	Howarth	Howarth	3:44
8.	"Separate"	Frehley, Regan	Frehley	4:56
9.	"New Kind of Lover"	Howarth	Howarth	3:14
10.	"The Acorn Is Spinning"	Frehley, Regan	(Instrumental)	4:50

== Personnel ==
Frehley's Comet

- Ace Frehley – guitars, lead and backing vocals
- Tod Howarth – guitars, keyboards, lead and backing vocals
- John Regan – bass guitar, backing vocals
- Jamie Oldaker – drums, percussion, backing vocals

Additional musicians

- Gordon G.G. Gebert – sequencing assistance on "Dancin' with Danger"

Production

- Scott Mabuchi – producer, engineer, mixing at Right Track Recording, New York City
- Michael Reiter – assistant engineer
- Debi Cornish – mixing assistant
- George Marino – mastering at Sterling Sound, New York City
- Jon and Marsha Zazula, Eddie Trunk – executive producers

== Charts ==
Chart (1988)	Peak position
UK Albums (Official Charts)	79
US Billboard 200	81
