= Origins Vol. 2 =

2020 studio album by Ace Frehley

Studio album of cover songs by Ace Frehley
- Released: September 18, 2020
- Recorded: 2016–2020
- Studios: Ace in the Hole Studios, NY & CA; The Creation Lab, Turlock, CA; Sienna Studios, Nashville, TN
- Genre: Hard rock
- Length: 46:40
- Label: Entertainment One Music
- Producers: Ace Frehley; Alex Salzman (co.)

Ace Frehley chronology
Spaceman (2018)	Origins Vol. 2 (2020)	10,000 Volts (2024)

Singles from Origins Vol. 2
- 1. "Space Truckin'" Released: July 28, 2020; 2. "I'm Down" Released: September 3, 2020

Origins Vol. 2 is the ninth studio album by American guitarist Ace Frehley, released on September 18, 2020. The album was announced on July 4, 2020. It is a covers album which features guest appearances from Lita Ford, John 5, Robin Zander, Rob Sabino and former Kiss guitarist Bruce Kulick. It is the sequel to Frehley's 2016 covers album, Origins Vol. 1.

== Track listing ==
Origins Vol. 2 track listing
No.	Title	Writer(s)	Original artist/arranger	Length
1.	"Good Times Bad Times"	Jimmy Page, John Paul Jones, John Bonham	Led Zeppelin	3:22
2.	"Never in My Life"	Leslie West, Corky Laing, Felix Pappalardi, Gail Collins Pappalardi	Mountain	4:03
3.	"Space Truckin'" (featuring Rob Sabino)	Ritchie Blackmore, Ian Gillan, Roger Glover, Jon Lord, Ian Paice	Deep Purple	5:03
4.	"I'm Down" (featuring John 5)	Lennon–McCartney	The Beatles	2:57
5.	"Jumpin' Jack Flash" (featuring Lita Ford)	Jagger/Richards	The Rolling Stones	3:27
6.	"Politician" (featuring John 5)	Jack Bruce, Pete Brown	Cream	4:27
7.	"Lola"	Ray Davies	The Kinks	3:45
8.	"30 Days in the Hole" (featuring Robin Zander)	Steve Marriott	Humble Pie	3:27
9.	"Manic Depression" (featuring Bruce Kulick)	Jimi Hendrix	The Jimi Hendrix Experience	4:01
10.	"Kicks"	Barry Mann, Cynthia Weil	Paul Revere & the Raiders	2:58
11.	"We Gotta Get Out of This Place"	Barry Mann, Cynthia Weil	The Animals	3:39
12.	"She"	Gene Simmons, Stephen Coronel	Kiss	5:25

== Personnel ==
Musicians

- Ace Frehley – vocals (tracks 1–7, 9–11), guitars (all tracks), bass (tracks 3, 5 and 11),
- Jeremy Ashbrock – guitars (tracks 1, 12), vocals (track 12)
- Ryan Spencer Cook – guitars and vocals (track 12)
- Lara Cove – backing vocals (tracks 1, 7)
- Lita Ford – vocals (track 5)
- John 5 – guitars (tracks 4, 6)
- Bruce Kulick – guitars (track 9)
- Rob Sabino – organ (track 3)
- Alex Salzman – bass (tracks 1, 2, 4, 6–10), guitars (track 10)
- Philip Shouse – bass, guitars, and vocals (track 12)
- Paul Simmons – drums (track 12)
- Matt Starr – drums (tracks 1–11), percussion (tracks 5, 8)
- Robin Zander – vocals (track 8)

Production

- Ace Frehley – producer
- Alex Salzman – co-producer, engineer
- Michael Everett – additional engineering (tracks 3, 11)
- Tim Brennan – engineer (track 12)
- Ronnie Mancuso – lead vocal engineering (track 5)
- Anthony Focx – mixing, mastering
- Marti Frederiksen – mixing

== Charts ==
Chart performance for Origins Vol. 2
Chart (2020)	Peak position
Austrian Albums (Ö3 Austria)	61
German Albums (Offizielle Top 100)	34
Swedish Albums (Sverigetopplistan)	21
Swiss Albums (Schweizer Hitparade)	39
US Billboard 200	81
US Independent Albums (Billboard)	14
US Top Rock Albums (Billboard)	9
