= Space Invader (album) =

Studio album by Ace Frehley
- Released: August 18, 2014
- Recorded: 2014
- Studios: The Creation Lab, Turlock, CA; The Hideout, Las Vegas, NV; Ace in the Hole Studios West, San Diego, CA; The Green Room, Los Angeles, CA; Spitfire Studio, Los Angeles, CA
- Genre: Hard rock
- Length: 53:52
- Label: E1 Music
- Producer: Ace Frehley

Ace Frehley chronology
| Anomaly (2009) | Space Invader (2014) | Origins, Vol. 1 (2016) |

Professional ratings
Aggregate scores
| Source | Rating |
|---|---|
| Metacritic | 57/100 |
Review scores
| Source | Rating |
| AllMusic | 3.5/5 stars |
| Blabbermouth.net | 8/10 |
| Classic Rock | 8/10 |
| Paste | 7.8/10 |
| PopMatters | 4/10 stars |
| Record Collector | 3/5 stars |
| Rolling Stone | 2.5/5 stars |

Space Invader is the sixth solo album by former Kiss guitarist Ace Frehley, released in the UK on August 18, 2014, and in the US on August 19 via eOne Music. His first album of new studio material since 2009's Anomaly, it was produced by Frehley, and recorded at The Creation Lab in Turlock, California.

Reaching No.9 on the Billboard 200 chart, it is the only solo album by a past or current Kiss member to attain a US top ten position.

== Artwork ==
The cover art was by fantasy artist Ken Kelly, who painted covers for the Kiss albums Destroyer (1976) and Love Gun (1977). "It was very exciting when I was approached with the idea of doing an album cover for Ace," he said. "I am very pleased with the results and proud to play a part of Ace's continuing successful career!"

== Reception ==
"His music still has the raw edge and offbeat sensibility that he brought to early Kiss and the best of his subsequent work…" opined Classic Rock. "The title track is quintessential Frehley; 'Toys' reminiscent of Aerosmith circa Rocks. And on two other space odysseys – 'Past the Milky Way' and the seven-minute instrumental 'Starship' – Ace travels to places that Kiss could never reach."

== Track listing ==
All tracks are written by Ace Frehley, except where noted.

| No. | Title | Writer(s) | Length |
|---|---|---|---|
| 1. | "Space Invader" | | 4:17 |
| 2. | "Gimme a Feelin' " | Frehley, John Ostrosky | 4:05 |
| 3. | "I Wanna Hold You" | Frehley, Gen Rubin, Sebastian Basco | 3:32 |
| 4. | "Change" | Frehley, Rachel Gordon | 4:08 |
| 5. | "Toys" | | 4:09 |
| 6. | "Immortal Pleasures" | Frehley, Gordon | 5:05 |
| 7. | "Inside the Vortex" | | 4:40 |
| 8. | "What Every Girl Wants" | | 3:46 |
| 9. | "Past the Milky Way" | Frehley, Chris Cassone | 5:31 |
| 10. | "Reckless" | | 4:12 |
| 11. | "The Joker" (Steve Miller Band cover) | Steve Miller, Eddie Curtis, Ahmet Ertegün | 3:35 |
| 12. | "Starship" | | 7:03 |

Deluxe edition
| No. | Title | Length |
|---|---|---|
| 13. | "Gimme a Feelin'" (radio edit) | 3:55 |
| 14. | "Space Invader" (radio edit) | 3:18 |

== Personnel ==
Band members

- Ace Frehley – lead and backing vocals, guitars, bass, sound effects, producer, engineer
- Chris Wyse – bass
- Matt Starr – drums, percussion, backing vocals

Additional musicians

- Alex Salzman – keyboards
- Phil Allen, Chris Cassone, Rachael Gordon, Ken Gullic, Warren Huart, Ronnie Mancuso, Larry Russell – backing vocals

Production

- Warren Huart – engineer, mixing
- Mike Everett, Alex Salzman, Ronnie Mancuso, Mark Greene, Larry Russell – engineers
- Phil Allen – assistant engineer
- Adam Ayan – mastering
- Paul Grosso – creative director, design
- Ken Kelly – cover painting
- Jayme Thornton – photography

== Charts ==
| Chart (2014) | Peak position |
|---|---|
| Australian Albums (ARIA) | 59 |
| Canadian Albums (Billboard Canadian) | 16 |
| Finnish Albums (Suomen virallinen lista) | 42 |
| Japanese Albums (Oricon) | 88 |
| Swedish Albums (Sverigetopplistan) | 28 |
| UK Albums (Official Charts Company) | 158 |
| UK Rock Albums (Official Charts Company) | 15 |
| US Albums (Billboard 200) | 9 |
