= Frehley's Comet (album) =

Studio album by Frehley's Comet
- Released: April 27, 1987
- Recorded: 1984–1987
- Studios: Right Track Recording, New York City, NY; Master Sound Astoria, Astoria, NY; Sound Ideas Studio, New York City, NY; BearTracks Studios, Suffern, NY
- Genres: Hard rock, glam metal
- Length: 41:31
- Labels: Atlantic, Megaforce
- Producers: Eddie Kramer, Ace Frehley, Jon Zazula

Frehley's Comet chronology
Ace Frehley (1978)	Frehley's Comet (1987)	Second Sighting (1988)

Singles from Frehley's Comet
- 1. "Into the Night" Released: 1987; 2. "Rock Soldiers" Released: 1987

Frehley's Comet is the second solo album by former Kiss guitarist Ace Frehley, and the first under the moniker Frehley's Comet. It was also the first album that Frehley released after leaving Kiss in 1982.

== Background ==
Frehley formed his solo band in 1984. He went on tour to perform his Kiss classics and some new material, which was recorded with his new band. The original Frehley's Comet lineup consisted of Ace Frehley (lead guitar, lead and backing vocals), Richie Scarlet (rhythm and lead guitar, lead and backing vocals), John Regan (bass, backing vocals), Arthur Stead (keyboards), and Anton Fig (drums). Fig also played drums on Frehley's 1978 Kiss solo album, as well as Kiss's Dynasty and Unmasked albums. In 1985, Richie Scarlet left the band to focus on a solo career. Scarlet's departure led to another lineup change with Arthur Stead being dropped and briefly replaced by Rob Sabino before Tod Howarth joining the band, handling rhythm guitar, lead and backup vocals duties. The original Frehley's Comet lineup recorded various demos and songs around 1984 and 1985, and many of them were performed live; however, the songs from that era are still officially unreleased, and only a few of them made it to the final recording of Frehley's Comet. Notably, "Breakout", "Into the Night" (a Russ Ballard cover), "We Got Your Rock", "Love Me Right", "Dolls", & "Stranger in a Strange Land" are the only songs on the record which were previously performed live in the band's early career and finally made it to the album.

== Songs ==
"Rock Soldiers" Ace Frehley wrote this with Chip Taylor. Frehley explained to American Songwriter magazine March/April 1988 how their collaboration worked: "Chip wrote most of the lyrics and I wrote most of the music because I've known Chip for years and he was aware of the incident that went down in the summer of '83 when I had the car accident and he thought it would be a great idea to write a song around it."

"Breakout" was co-written with Kiss member Eric Carr around the Music from "The Elder" recording era. The song, however, was not used on the record and was later released by Kiss on their Revenge album, with the title "Carr Jam 1981". The instrumental part of the song was written by Frehley and Carr; however, the lyrics of the song were written by Richie Scarlet, as this was one of his vocal performances on the Ace Frehley shows before he left the band in 1985. Scarlet confirms this in a 2019 KISS book Partners in Crime, stating that Frehley's only lyrical contribution to "Breakout" was the line "The food here sucks, I am not about to wait". The band recorded a demo of the song with Richie Scarlet on lead vocals, and Frehley sharing the lead guitar solo parts with Scarlet. On the Frehley's Comet record lead vocals are handled by Tod Howarth with all the guitar solo parts handled by Frehley. Whenever Frehley performed this song live, he dedicated it to Carr.

"Into the Night" was a minor hit single for Frehley, reaching No. 27 on Billboard's Mainstream Rock Tracks chart in 1987. The song was originally written and recorded by Russ Ballard (on his 1984 album Russ Ballard), who also composed Frehley's Top 20 single "New York Groove".

"We Got Your Rock" was originally written in 1983 by Marty Kupersmith of Jay and the Americans (a band with ties to Paul Stanley's early band Uncle Joe via drummer Neal Teeman) as a follow-up to Joan Jett's "I Love Rock & Roll". It was previously recorded in 1985 by ex-Steeler bassist Rik Fox's band SIN. The SIN demo also had Kiss connections as it was produced by Dana Strum (who later played bass guitar with Vinnie Vincent in Vinnie Vincent Invasion, and whose post-Vinnie Vincent Invasion band Slaughter opened Kiss' 1990 Hot in the Shade Tour), and featured future Kiss guitarist Tommy Thayer on backing vocals.

"Calling to You" is a re-write of a song called "Mega Force", originally recorded by the band 707 in 1982. Tod Howarth had been a principal member and songwriter with 707 and likely brought the song with him when he joined Frehley's Comet. Originally recorded as the theme to the motion picture Megaforce, the song had been 707's biggest chart achievement (No. 12 on Billboard Rock Tracks). The "Calling to You" version by Frehley's Comet features altered lyrics, with Jonathan Cain's writing credit removed and Frehley's added. The Frehley's Comet album was released on Jon Zazula's apparently unrelated Megaforce Records.

== Videos ==
- "Into the Night" (filmed on location in San Francisco, California)
- "Rock Soldiers" (shot in Toronto, Canada)

== Reception ==
Professional ratings
Review scores
Source	Rating
AllMusic	3/5 stars
Collector's Guide to Heavy Metal	7/10
Kerrang!	3/5 stars

Greg Prato of AllMusic wrote that "Frehley's Comet is just as good (perhaps even better) than Kiss albums from the same era like Asylum and Crazy Nights but is a letdown when compared to 1978's far superior Ace Frehley", because "Ace was often swayed into replicating the then-flourishing keyboard-sweetened pop-metal (which) reigned supreme in 1987" instead of retaining his robust "guitar-fueled heavy metal" sound. Canadian journalist Martin Popoff judged positively the recording and described Frehley's Comet as "an extremely likable hard rock/metal album", "well-produced, big league, but warm and varied."

In 2016, Eddie Trunk selected the album as one of the albums that "changed his life", for the TeamRock website.

== Track listing ==
Side one
No.	Title	Writer(s)	Lead vocals	Length
1.	"Rock Soldiers"	Ace Frehley, Chip Taylor	Frehley	5:05
2.	"Breakout"	Frehley, Eric Carr, Richie Scarlet	Tod Howarth	3:38
3.	"Into the Night"	Russ Ballard	Frehley	4:12
4.	"Something Moved"	Howarth	Howarth	4:02
5.	"We Got Your Rock"	Frehley, Marty Kupersmith	Frehley	4:12

Side two
No.	Title	Writer(s)	Lead vocals	Length
6.	"Love Me Right"	Frehley, Ira Schickman	Frehley	3:54
7.	"Calling to You"	Frehley, Howarth, Kevin Russell, Jim McClarty	Howarth	4:20
8.	"Dolls"	Frehley	Frehley	3:28
9.	"Stranger in a Strange Land"	Frehley	Frehley	4:02
10.	"Fractured Too"	Frehley, John Regan	(instrumental)	4:14

== Personnel ==
Band members

- Ace Frehley – lead and rhythm guitars, lead and backing vocals
- Tod Howarth – rhythm and lead guitars, keyboards, lead and backing vocals
- John Regan – bass guitar, backing vocals
- Anton Fig – drums, percussion

Additional musicians

- Robert Sabino – keyboards
- Gordon G.G. Gebert – synthesizer, samples and sequences on "Breakout", "Something Moved", "Dolls"
- Chay Lentin, David Spinner, Frank Simms, Lara Kramer, Monique Frehley, Tom Ayers – background vocals

Production

- Produced by Eddie Kramer and Ace Frehley
- Additional production by Tod Howarth and John Regan
- Recorded by Eddie Kramer, Chris Bubacz, Corky Stasiak and Mario Rodriguez
- Mixed by Eddie Kramer and Scott Mabuchi and Rightrack Studios; assisted by Jeff Abisker
- Mastered at Atlantic Studios by Stephen Innocenzi
- Bob Defrin – art direction
- Jon Zazula – executive producer

== Charts ==
Chart (1987)	Peak position
Australian Albums (Kent Music Report)	100
Canada Top Albums/CDs (RPM)	38
Swedish Albums (Sverigetopplistan)	17
US Billboard 200	43
