= 10,000 Volts =

Studio album by Ace Frehley
- Released: February 23, 2024
- Recorded: 2021–2023
- Studios: Ace in the Hole Studios, NY & NJ; Mojo Vegas 6160, NJ; Lionshead Studio, NY; Beatlab Buffalo, NY; On Deck Sound Studios, Litchfield, CT
- Genres: Hard rock, heavy metal
- Length: 40:36
- Label: MNRK
- Producers: Ace Frehley, Steve Brown

Ace Frehley chronology
| Origins Vol. 2 (2020) | 10,000 Volts (2024) |

Singles from 10,000 Volts
- 1. "10,000 Volts" Released: November 28, 2023; 2. "Walkin' on the Moon" Released: February 2, 2024; 3. "Cherry Medicine" Released: February 22, 2024

Professional ratings
Review scores
| Source | Rating |
|---|---|
| AllMusic | 3.5/5 stars |
| metal.de | 6/10 |
| Metal Hammer Germany | 5.5/7 |
| Rock Hard | 7.5/10 |

10,000 Volts is the tenth and final studio album by American rock musician Ace Frehley, released on February 23, 2024. Frehley produced the album himself along with Trixter band member Steve Brown. It peaked at No. 72 on the Billboard 200 chart.

== Track listing ==
All tracks are written by Ace Frehley and Steve Brown, except where indicated.

| No. | Title | Writer(s) | Length |
|---|---|---|---|
| 1. | "10,000 Volts" | Frehley, Brown, David Julian | 3:24 |
| 2. | "Walkin' on the Moon" | | 3:44 |
| 3. | "Cosmic Heart" | Frehley, Brown, David Julian | 3:53 |
| 4. | "Cherry Medicine" | | 3:39 |
| 5. | "Back into My Arms Again" | Frehley, Arthur Stead | 3:36 |
| 6. | "Fightin' for Life" | | 3:20 |
| 7. | "Blinded" | | 3:53 |
| 8. | "Constantly Cute" | | 3:38 |
| 9. | "Life of a Stranger" (Nadia cover) | Nadia Fares, Matthew Wilder | 3:57 |
| 10. | "Up in the Sky" | | 4:27 |
| 11. | "Stratosphere" (instrumental) | | 3:05 |

== Personnel ==
- Ace Frehley – lead and backing vocals, guitars (all), bass guitar on track 9, producer, creative direction and design
- Steve Brown – guitars and backing vocals (all), bass guitar on tracks 2, 4, 6–8, 10–11, keyboards on tracks 3, 9–11, drums on track 11, overdubs, percussion, co-producer, engineer
- Anton Fig – drums on tracks 1, 4, 6
- Joey Cassata – drums on tracks 3, 5, 7–9
- Jordan Cannata – drums on track 2
- Matt Starr – drums on track 10
- Lara Cove – backing vocals on track 8
- David Julian – additional guitar, keyboards & percussion on tracks 1, 3 & 5
- PJ Farley – bass guitar on tracks 1, 5
- Chris Lester – bass guitar on track 3
- Eric Ragno – B3 organ, mellotron & string arrangement on track 9
- Alex Salzman – additional percussion on track 10

=== Production ===
- Ace Frehley – producer, engineer
- Steve Brown – co-producer, engineer
- Alex Salzman – engineer
- David Julian – engineer, mixing
- Bruno Ravel – mixing, mastering
- Anton Fig – additional engineering
- Sam Santos – cover design
- Jayme Thornton – photography

== Charts ==
Chart performance for 10,000 Volts
| Chart (2024) | Peak position |
|---|---|
| US Billboard 200 | 72 |
| US Top Album Sales (Billboard) | 4 |
| US Top Rock Albums (Billboard) | 10 |
| US Top Rock & Alternative Albums (Billboard) | 13 |
