= No Regrets (book) =

Memoir by Ace Frehley

No Regrets: A Rock 'n' Roll Memoir
- Author: Ace Frehley, Joe Layden, John Ostrosky
- Language: English
- Genre: Memoir
- Publisher: VH1 Books
- Publication date: November 1, 2011
- Publication place: United States
- Media type: Print (Hardback)
- Pages: 320
- ISBN: 978-1451613940

No Regrets: A Rock 'n' Roll Memoir is a memoir co-written by former Kiss lead guitarist Ace Frehley, Joe Layden and John Ostrosky. The book covers the period from the early days of his life, his tenure with Kiss, solo career up to today. The book also contains various pictures from Frehley's life. The design was done by Joe O'Meara. Frehley planned to write a follow-up to No Regrets.

== Release ==
No Regrets debuted at #10 on New York Times' list in the hardcover non-fiction category. Released on November 1, 2011, the book peaked at #1 at Amazon.com in the Music and Composers & Musicians categories. The release of the book was followed by Frehley's book signing at several book stores across the country.
