= Origins Vol. 1 =

Studio album of cover songs by Ace Frehley
- Released: April 13, 2016
- Recorded: 2015
- Studios: The Creation Lab, Turlock, CA; Signature Sound, San Diego, CA; Ace in the Hole Studios West, San Diego, CA; The Nook, Studio City, CA; Spitfire Studio, Los Angeles, CA; Mike's Home Studio, Seattle, WA
- Genre: Hard rock
- Length: 51:33
- Label: Entertainment One Music
- Producers: Ace Frehley, Warren Huart, Ken Gullic, Paul Stanley

Ace Frehley chronology
Space Invader (2014)	Origins Vol. 1 (2016)	Spaceman (2018)

Singles from Origins Vol. 1
- 1. "White Room" Released: February 11, 2016

Professional ratings
Review scores
Source	Rating
AllMusic	4/5 stars
Blabbermouth.net	8/10
Classic Rock	4/5 stars
New Noise	2.5/5 stars
PopMatters	5/10 stars

Origins Vol. 1 is the seventh studio album by American guitarist Ace Frehley, released on April 13, 2016 in Japan and April 15 in the United States. It is a covers album which features guest appearances from Slash, Lita Ford, John 5, Mike McCready, and Frehley's former Kiss bandmate Paul Stanley. The album was announced on February 11, 2016.

== Album information ==
In addition to covers of tracks by Cream and Thin Lizzy, Origins Vol. 1 features newly recorded versions of several Kiss songs which were written but not sung by Frehley, such as "Cold Gin" and "Parasite", as well as a new version of the Kiss song "Rock and Roll Hell" from the Creatures of the Night album, which he never performed on, as he was leaving the band at the time.

In a 2016 interview with The Pods & Sods Network, Frehley described other songs that were considered, recorded and about plans for Origins Vol. 2.

== Reception ==
The album entered the Billboard 200 chart at number 23 selling 16,113 in its first week, but totaling 16,386 copies including streams and tracks.

== Track listing ==
No.	Title	Writer(s)	Original artist/arranger	Length
1.	"White Room"	Jack Bruce, Pete Brown	Cream	5:04
2.	"Street Fighting Man"	Mick Jagger, Keith Richards	The Rolling Stones	4:01
3.	"Spanish Castle Magic" (featuring John 5)	Jimi Hendrix	The Jimi Hendrix Experience	3:35
4.	"Fire and Water" (featuring Paul Stanley)	Andy Fraser, Paul Rodgers	Free	4:11
5.	"Emerald" (featuring Slash)	Phil Lynott, Brian Robertson, Brian Downey, Scott Gorham	Thin Lizzy	4:29
6.	"Bring It On Home"	Willie Dixon	Led Zeppelin	4:26
7.	"Wild Thing" (featuring Lita Ford)	Chip Taylor	The Troggs	3:45
8.	"Parasite" (featuring John 5)	Frehley	Kiss	4:03
9.	"Magic Carpet Ride"	Rushton Moreve, John Kay	Steppenwolf	3:43
10.	"Cold Gin" (featuring Mike McCready)	Frehley	Kiss	5:18
11.	"Till the End of the Day"	Ray Davies	The Kinks	2:27
12.	"Rock and Roll Hell"	Gene Simmons, Bryan Adams, Jim Vallance	Kiss	6:31

== Personnel ==
Source: CD booklet

- Ace Frehley – lead vocals (all, except 4); rhythm, additional and lead guitars (all); bass guitar (1, 6–7, 9, 11–12), engineer (4), producer
- Chris Wyse – bass guitar (2–5, 8, 10)
- Scot Coogan – drums (1, 3, 5–11); lead vocals (1, 6)
- Matt Starr – drums (2, 4, 12)
- Ray Brandis – percussion (2, 6, 9, 11)
- Warren Huart – harmony lead guitar (5)

Special Guests

- John 5 – guitar solo and lead guitar (3, 8)
- Paul Stanley – lead vocals and co-producer (4)
- Slash – guitar solo and lead guitar (5)
- Lita Ford – lead guitar and lead vocals (7)
- Mike McCready – additional guitar (10)

Production

- Warren Huart – producer (3, 7, 12), engineer, mixing
- Ken Gullic – producer (12)
- Sam Martin – engineer, mixing assistant
- Alex Salzman – engineer
- Mike Everett – engineer (2)
- Josh Evans – overdubs engineer (10)
- Greg Collins – vocals engineer (4)
- Jonathan Burns – mixing assistant (4)
- Pablo Valda, Eric Gonzales – mixing assistants
- Adam Ayan – mastering

== Charts ==
Chart (2016)	Peak position
Austrian Albums (Ö3 Austria)	51
Belgian Albums (Ultratop Flanders)	111
Belgian Albums (Ultratop Wallonia)	99
Canadian Albums (Billboard)	35
Dutch Albums (Album Top 100)	58
Japanese Albums (Oricon)	96
Norwegian Albums (VG-lista)	15
Swedish Albums (Sverigetopplistan)	22
Swiss Albums (Schweizer Hitparade)	44
UK Albums (OCC)	170
US Billboard 200	23

The album reached No. 1 on the Billboard Hard Rock Albums Chart, and No. 4 on the Billboard Rock Album Charts.
