= Frehley's Comet =

American rock band

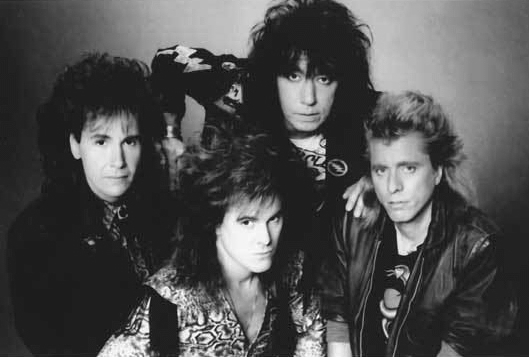
- Frehley's Comet in 1988. L-R: John Regan, Tod Howarth, Ace Frehley, Jamie Oldaker

Background information
- Also known as: Ace Frehley
- Origin: New York City, New York, US
- Genres: Hard rock; glam metal
- Years active: 1984–1988 (reunions: 2017, 2018)
- Labels: Atlantic; Megaforce
- Past members: Ace Frehley; John Regan; Anton Fig; Richie Scarlet; Arthur Stead; Rob Sabino; Tod Howarth; Billy Ward; Jamie Oldaker

Frehley's Comet was an American hard rock band formed and led by ex-Kiss lead guitarist Ace Frehley. The group released two studio albums and one live EP under the moniker, before Frehley released Trouble Walkin' in 1989 as a solo act. After the 1980s, Frehley would continue touring with many of the same musicians, sometimes referred to as the Ace Frehley Band. The group's name has been used in tribute bands such as Return of the Comet and Frehley's Vomit.

== Naming ==
The band name was a pun of a pun; Bill Haley & His Comets was a 1950s music group that derived its name as a pun of the typical mispronunciation of Halley's Comet (properly pronounced as "Hal-lee", rhyming with valley, but commonly mispronounced as "Hay-lee"), a comet which orbits the Sun near Earth about every 75 years. Frehley's surname is commonly mispronounced as well: rather than the most frequent pronunciation, "Free-lee", he has explained it is pronounced "Freh-lee" (using a soft 'e' sound) and not "Fray-lee" (using a long 'a' sound).

== History ==
Before forming a band for his post-Kiss career, Frehley had previously released a solo album in 1978 which was the most successful of the Kiss solo albums, and laid the groundwork for his solo career. Frehley left Kiss in 1982, but retained a one-quarter share in Kiss and could not release any solo projects until 1985 without losing that share.

During this time Ace put together a band for his solo work, the original lineup consisted of Richie Scarlet on guitar, John Regan on bass, Regan's Peter Frampton bandmate Arthur Stead on keyboards, and former Kiss and Spider drummer Anton Fig. This band played live for the first time on November 30, 1984, and demoed 20 songs in various sessions with producers Eddie Kramer, Tony Bongiovi, Chris Kimsey and Vini Poncia.

In May 1985, Frehley's friend from the Bronx, Rob Sabino, who also produced one of Scarlet's solo albums in 1984, replaced Stead (who went on to join Public Enemy) on keyboards. British label Bronze Records reportedly offered the band a deal in the summer of 1985 but withdrew it due to Frehley's "unreliability", before ultimately folding in early 1986.

In November 1986 Frehley signed a six-album deal with Megaforce Records. Sabino and Regan had left the band at that point but Regan returned from touring with John Waite and Patti Smith after the recording deal was signed. In December 1986, before they made their initial record, with producer Eddie Kramer, Scarlet was replaced by former Cheap Trick member Tod Howarth who played guitar and keyboards.

Frehley's Comet was supposed to simply be the title of Frehley's next solo album, but Frehley decided to use that as the name of the band rather than release the record as a solo artist. Fig did not tour for the album and was replaced by Billy Ward as touring drummer. Before the second album, Second Sighting, Ward was replaced on drums by veteran Eric Clapton Band member Jamie Oldaker who played his first show with the band on September 22, 1987, and also played on tour.

Two studio albums and one live album were released under the "Comet" moniker (Live+1 featured four songs performed live in concert and one original studio song). The last show under the Frehley's Comet name was in August 1988, opening for Iron Maiden, and Howarth and Oldaker left before the end of the year.

In 1989, for Trouble Walkin', his third studio release (produced by Eddie Kramer), Frehley dropped the Frehley's Comet name. The name change was partially due to concert promoters referring to the band as "Ace Frehley's Comet". Tod Howarth was replaced by a returning Richie Scarlet, and Jamie Oldaker by ex-Riot drummer Sandy Slavin (although Anton Fig and ex-Kiss Drummer Peter Criss did perform some of the percussion work on the album). According to Frehley, he offered then Kiss drummer Eric Carr a chance to be on a song. However, Paul Stanley and Gene Simmons dissuaded Carr from doing so. The album featured numerous guest vocalists including Peter Criss and Sebastian Bach. The tour ended and the band dissolved after John Regan resigned with immediate effect after a show in Las Vegas on April 11, 1990. Frehley did not perform live in any form until July 1992.

Frehley put his solo career on hold to rejoin Kiss in 1996. He has since resumed his solo career with Richie Scarlet back in his touring band. After touring Australia together with Gene Simmons and his solo band in 2018, Frehley fired his entire solo band including Scarlet with whom he had played on and off since 1984 and replaced them with Simmons's backing band.

In 2013, Richie Scarlet toured with a band Frehley's Vomit. In 2014, Regan and Howarth reunited in the band Four By Fate. The band played various one-off reunion shows in 2017 and 2018 with Frehley, Tod Howarth, John Regan, and Anton Fig together. As semi-tribute band, Return of the Comet was formed by members in 2018.

== Personnel ==
=== Members ===
- Ace Frehley – lead and rhythm guitar, lead vocals (1984–1988; died 2025)
- John Regan – bass, drums, backing vocals (1984–1988; died 2023)
- Anton Fig – drums, percussion (1984–1987, 1987)
- Richie Scarlet – rhythm and lead guitar, vocals (1984–1985)
- Arthur Stead – keyboards (1984–1985)
- Rob Sabino – keyboards (1985–1986)
- Tod Howarth – rhythm and lead guitar, keyboards, lead vocals (1986–1988)
- Billy Ward – drums, percussion (1987)(touring)
- Jamie Oldaker – drums, percussion, backing vocals (1987-1988; died 2020)

==== Line-ups ====
1984	1984–1985	1985–1986	1986
Ace Frehley – lead guitar, lead vocals; Anton Fig – drums, percussion; John Regan – bass guitar, drums, backing vocals; Richie Scarlet – rhythm guitar, vocals	Ace Frehley – lead guitar, lead vocals; Anton Fig – drums, percussion; John Regan – bass guitar, drums, backing vocals; Richie Scarlet – rhythm guitar, vocals; Arthur Stead – keyboards	Ace Frehley – lead guitar, lead vocals; Anton Fig – drums, percussion; John Regan – bass guitar, drums, backing vocals; Richie Scarlet – rhythm guitar, vocals; Rob Sabino – keyboards	Ace Frehley – guitars, lead vocals; Anton Fig – drums, percussion; John Regan – bass guitar, drums, backing vocals
1986–1987, 2017, 2018	1987	1987	1987-1988
Ace Frehley – lead guitar, lead vocals; Anton Fig – drums, percussion; John Regan – bass guitar, drums, backing vocals; Tod Howarth – rhythm guitar, lead vocals, keyboards	Ace Frehley – lead guitar, lead vocals; John Regan – bass guitar, drums, backing vocals; Tod Howarth – rhythm guitar, lead vocals, keyboards; Billy Ward – drums, percussion	Ace Frehley – lead guitar, lead vocals; John Regan – bass guitar, drums, backing vocals; Tod Howarth – rhythm guitar, lead vocals, keyboards; Anton Fig – drums, percussion	Ace Frehley – lead guitar, lead vocals; John Regan – bass guitar, drums, backing vocals; Tod Howarth – rhythm guitar, lead vocals, keyboards; Jamie Oldaker – drums, percussion, backing vocals

== Discography ==
=== Studio albums ===
Release date	Title	Billboard
July 7, 1987	Frehley's Comet	43
May 24, 1988	Second Sighting	81

=== Live albums/EPs ===
Release date	Title	Billboard
February 1988	Live+1	84

== Demos ==
- Sterling Sound tape June 12, 1984 – Back Into My Arms Again (Stead/Frehley), I Got the Touch (Stead/Frehley), I'm An Animal (Stead/Kimsey/Regan), I Will Survive (Stead/Frehley), Breakout (Carr/Scarlet/Frehley), We Got Your Rock (Kupersmith/Frehley). Produced by Chris Kimsey.
- Demo 2, 1984/85 – Audio/Video (Stead/Frehley), Give It to Me Anyway (Frehley/Stead/Scarlet), Dolls (Frehley). Produced by Eddie Kramer (unconfirmed)
- Summer 1985 demo – Stranger in a Strange Land (Frehley), Back on the Streets (Vincent/Friedman), I Heard an Angel (Scarlet), Rock or Be Rocked (Bob Halligan Jr.), Baby It's You (Mack David, Barney Williams, Burt Bacharach – The Beatles cover)
- Power Station studio demo 1985 – Dolls (Frehley), Into the Night (Ballard), Words Are Not Enough (Jim Keneally/Frehley), The Hurt is On (Frehley/Sabino), The Boys are Back in Town (Thin Lizzy cover). Produced by Tony Bongiovi.
- Vini Poncia demo 1985/86? – Remember Me (Frehley/Cathcart), Wired-Up (Jeff Paris (musician)), The Girl Can't Dance (Danny Tate/Taylor Rhodes). Produced by Vini Poncia.

== Filmography ==
- Live+4 (1988) (VHS)

== See also ==
- List of glam metal bands and artists
