= Ace Frehley (album) =

- Cover art by Eraldo Carugati

Studio album by Ace Frehley
- Released: September 18, 1978
- Recorded: June–July 1978
- Studios: The Mansion, Sharon, Connecticut; Plaza Sound Studios, New York City
- Genre: Hard rock
- Length: 36:44
- Label: Casablanca
- Producers: Eddie Kramer; Ace Frehley

Ace Frehley chronology
Ace Frehley (1978)	Frehley's Comet (1987)

Singles from Ace Frehley
- 1. "New York Groove" Released: 1978

Ace Frehley is the first solo album by American guitarist and former Kiss member Ace Frehley, released on September 18, 1978, by Casablanca Records. It was one of four albums released by each separate Kiss member as a solo act, but yet still under the Kiss label, coming out alongside Peter Criss, Paul Stanley, and Gene Simmons.

Ace Frehley contains the cover hit single "New York Groove", which was written by Russ Ballard and recorded by Hello in 1975. The song would prove to be a major hit for Frehley and boosted sales for its parent album. The album would also prove to be the most successful of the four Kiss solo albums.

== Background ==
The album was produced by Frehley and Eddie Kramer. It featured Anton Fig on drums. He later performed session work on the Kiss albums Dynasty and Unmasked, and later became a member of Ace Frehley's band Frehley's Comet. Fig and Will Lee, who played bass on three of the album's tracks, later gained prominence as members of the World's Most Dangerous Band and the CBS Orchestra along with Paul Shaffer on Late Night with David Letterman and Late Show with David Letterman. In an interview with Loudwire, Frehley stated that some of the songs from his solo album were originally slated for the fifth Kiss album, Rock and Roll Over. In an interview with Ultimate Guitar, Frehley also recalled being inspired by an incident at a band business meeting before work began on his solo album: "I remember Paul and Gene made a statement to me in front of everybody that was kind of a dig. They said, 'Oh Ace, by the way – if you need any help on your record, don't hesitate to call us.' In the back of my mind, I'm saying, 'I don't need their help.'"

== Critical reception ==
Professional ratings
Review scores
Source	Rating
AllMusic	4/5 stars
Collector's Guide to Heavy Metal	8/10
Pitchfork	(8.5/10)
Rolling Stone	2/5 stars
Spin Alternative Record Guide	3/10
Uncut	3/5 stars

In a retrospective review Greg Prato of AllMusic wrote that "of the four Kiss solo albums, the best of the bunch is Ace Frehley's", who "did not stray far from the expected heavy Kiss sound". Jason Josephes of Pitchfork concurred that it was the standout of the Kiss solo efforts, describing it as "a melange of riff rock, power pop, and just a little bit of soul". Canadian journalist Martin Popoff defined Ace Frehley as "the least pretentious, heaviest and best-selling platter of the Kiss' solo album quartet", describing the music as "solid, well-rounded simplified '70s metal".

== Commercial performance ==
"New York Groove", which was first recorded in 1975 by the glam rock band Hello, rose to No. 13 on the US Billboard Hot 100 singles chart. This was the highest chart placement for any of the singles released from the 1978 solo albums. The album reached No. 26 on the US Billboard 200 album chart. It was certified platinum on October 2, 1978, and shipped over 1,000,000 copies. It is the highest selling of the four Kiss solo albums in the Sound Scan era (1991 onwards).

== Track listing ==
All credits adapted from the original release.

All tracks are written by Ace Frehley, except where noted.

Side one
No.	Title	Writer(s)	Length
1.	"Rip It Out"	Frehley, Larry Kelly, Sue Kelly	3:40
2.	"Speedin' Back to My Baby"	Frehley, Jeanette Frehley	3:37
3.	"Snow Blind"		3:55
4.	"Ozone"		4:43
5.	"What's on Your Mind?"		3:28

Side two
No.	Title	Writer(s)	Length
6.	"New York Groove" (Hello cover)	Russ Ballard	3:03
7.	"I'm in Need of Love"		4:39
8.	"Wiped-Out"	Frehley, Anton Fig	4:13
9.	"Fractured Mirror" (instrumental)		5:26
Total length:			36:44

== Personnel ==
Artist

- Ace Frehley – lead and backing vocals, lead, rhythm and acoustic guitar, guitar synthesizer, bass

Additional personnel

- Anton Fig – drums, percussion
- Will Lee – bass on "Ozone", "I'm in Need of Love" and "Wiped-Out"
- Carl Tallarico – drums on "Fractured Mirror"
- David Lasley and Susan Collins – backing vocals on "Speedin' Back to My Baby", "What's on Your Mind?" and "New York Groove"
- Larry Kelly – backing vocals on "Rip It Out"
- Bill "Bear" Scheniman – bell on "Fractured Mirror"
- Bobby McAdams – power mouth (talkbox) on "New York Groove"

Production

- Eddie Kramer and Ace Frehley – producers
- Eddie Kramer and Rob Freeman – engineers
- Eric Block and Don Hunerburg – assistant engineers
- George Marino – mastered at Sterling Sound, New York
- Dennis Woloch – album design
- Eraldo Carugati – album artwork

== Charts ==
Chart (1978–1979)	Peak position
Australian Albums (Kent Music Report)	48
Canada Top Albums/CDs (RPM)	34
Japanese Albums (Oricon)	30
US Billboard 200	26

== Certification ==
Region	Certification	Certified units/sales
Canada (Music Canada)	Gold	50,000^{^}
United States (RIAA)	Platinum	1,000,000^{^}
^{^} Shipments figures based on certification alone.
