= Anomaly (Ace Frehley album) =

Studio album by Ace Frehley
- Released: September 15, 2009
- Recorded: 2007–2009
- Studios: Frehley's Home Studio, Westchester County, NY; Schoolhouse Studios, New York City, NY; Poppy Studios, Burbank, CA; Undercurrent Studios, Los Angeles, CA
- Genre: Hard rock
- Length: 54:13
- Label: Bronx Born Records
- Producers: Ace Frehley, Frank Munoz, Marti Frederiksen ("Fox on the Run")

Ace Frehley chronology
Trouble Walkin' (1989)	Anomaly (2009)	Space Invader (2014)

Anomaly is the fifth solo album by former Kiss guitarist Ace Frehley, released on September 15, 2009. It is his first album of new studio material since 1989's Trouble Walkin'. Frehley produced most of the album himself, with Marti Frederiksen producing the Sweet cover "Fox on the Run". The album was dedicated to Kiss drummer Eric Carr, Pantera guitarist Dimebag Darrell, and Les Paul. The album debuted at number 27 on the Billboard 200, number 20 on the Swedish album chart and number 52 on the German chart.

== Marketing ==
Frehley's official website and YouTube channel released a promo commercial for the album. In it, a boy is outside a sound studio, telling a girl that he has waited for the new album for over a year. Their uncle, sporting a mullet and a Trouble Walkin' T-shirt, tells them he has waited 20 years. Suddenly, from a thick cloud of smoke, Frehley appears on a Chopper. He makes a hitchhiking-like gesture (referencing the Kiss Meets the Phantom of the Park film, when using his transportation powers), magically giving the trio copies of the CD. He lets out an "Ack!" (another reference to the aforementioned film, in which it was his catch phrase), then rides out.

The CD cover folds into a pyramid. Another version of the CD included a temporary tattoo. Anomaly has also been pressed on limited copies of vinyl records.

The track "Outer Space" is a downloadable song for the Rock Band series.

== Reception ==
Professional ratings
Review scores
Source	Rating
AllMusic	4.5/5 stars
Blabbermouth.net	7.5/10
Classic Rock	8/10 stars
Metal Temple	7/10 stars

AllMusic reviewer stated that "the album remade a case for Frehley as one of rock's most potent, soulful axe slingers", who "surprised even longtime supporters with its forceful, confident performances and sharp songwriting." Anomaly, wrote longtime Kiss supporter Geoff Barton, "is full of the Spaceman's signature charms: guitar playing that teeters on the brink of disintegration; gobby Bronx attitude; shout-it-out-loud vocals; songwriting skills that veer between brilliant and blundering. If Kiss's new album Sonic Boom is a slickly realised summation of the band's heritage, then Anomaly is the exact opposite: it's Ace at his most idiosyncratic, vulnerable, prankish, calamitous and, yes, cataclysmic." Justin Crafton of Sleaze Roxx.com reminded how the release of this album marks Frehley's 3rd year of sobriety and "features Ace at the top of his game, mentally, physically and musically."

== Track listing ==
All tracks are written by Ace Frehley, except where indicated.

No.	Title	Writer(s)	Length
1.	"Foxy & Free"		3:43
2.	"Outer Space"	Jesse Mendez, David Askew, Frehley	3:48
3.	"Pain in the Neck"		4:18
4.	"Fox on the Run" (Sweet cover)	Andy Scott, Brian Connolly, Steve Priest, Mick Tucker	3:34
5.	"Genghis Khan"		6:08
6.	"Too Many Faces"		4:22
7.	"Change the World"		4:11
8.	"Space Bear" (Instrumental)		5:24
9.	"A Little Below the Angels"		4:17
10.	"Sister"		4:48
11.	"It's a Great Life"		4:00
12.	"Fractured Quantum" (Instrumental)		6:19

iTunes bonus track
No.	Title	Length
13.	"The Return of Space Bear"	5:44

Deluxe Edition (2017) bonus tracks
No.	Title	Writer(s)	Length
13.	"Hard for Me"	Frehley, Sebastian Bach	3:42
14.	"Pain in the Neck" (Slower Version)		4:46
15.	"The Return of Space Bear"		5:47

== Other songs ==
Tracks recorded and/or not on the album

1. "Laurado"
2. "Skels" - Became "Space Bear"
3. "Hard for Me" - Became "Foxy & Free"
4. "Steamroller"
5. "The Pursuit of Rock 'n' Roll" - Later released on Frehley's 2018 album Spaceman
6. "The King Is Kong" - Became "Genghis Khan"

== Personnel ==
Adapted from the liner notes of the limited edition CD Slipcase release by Bronx Born in 2009.

- Ace Frehley – lead and backing vocals, electric and acoustic guitars, bass on track 2, 5, 9, 11 and 12
- Anthony Esposito – bass
- Anton Fig – drums, percussion on all tracks except 4, 10, and 12
- Derrek Hawkins – rhythm guitar on track 2
- Scot Coogan – drums, percussion on track 10, background vocals on 3 and 10
- Marti Frederiksen – bass, keyboards and backing vocals on track 4; hammond organ and rhythm guitar on track 9; drums, percussion and strings on track 12, producer and engineer on track 4, mixing
- Brian Tichy – drums on track 4
- Steve Luongo – Drums & additional percussion
- Pearl Aday – backing vocals on track 5
- Kari Kimmel – backing vocals on track 5
- Monique Frehley – backing vocals on track 9
- Ashley Suppa – backing vocals on track 9
- Danielle Ciccimarra – backing vocals on track 9
- Dominique Ciccimarra – backing vocals on track 9

Production

- Frank Munoz – associate producer
- Jay Messina – engineer on tracks 1, 3, 5, 6, 7, 8, 11.
- Bruce Somers – engineer on track 5
- Tim Hatfield – engineer on track 10
- Alex Salzman – engineer on tracks 2, 9 and 12, overdubs engineer
- Rich Tozzoli – overdubs engineer on tracks 1, 3, 5, 6, 7, 8, 10, 11.
- Anthony Focx – mixing, digital editing, mastering

Mixed by Anthony Focx and Marti Frederiksen at Foxhole Underground Studios, Los Angeles, CA. Additional Digital editing by Anthony Focx. Mastered by Anthony Focx.

Tracks 1, 5, 6, 7, 8, 11 Recorded at Schoolhouse Studios, New York, NY. Tracks 2, 3, 9, 10, 12 Recorded at Ace In The Hole Studios, Westchester, NY. Track 4 Recorded and Track 12 Overdubs at Poppy Studios, Burbank, CA. Track 5 Additional Recording at Undercurrent Studios, Los Angeles, CA.

== Charts ==
Year	Chart	Position
2009	Independent Albums (US)	2
2009	Swedish Albums Chart	20
2009	Billboard 200 (US)	27
2009	Norwegian Albums Chart	34
2009	Dutch MegaCharts	99

"Fox on the Run" reached #30 on the Billboard Heritage Rock Chart.
