= Spaceman (Ace Frehley album) =

Studio album by Ace Frehley
- Released: October 19, 2018
- Recorded: 2017–2018
- Studios: Ace in the Hole Studios, Westchester, New York
- Genre: Hard rock
- Length: 37:07
- Label: Entertainment One Music
- Producers: Ace Frehley, Alex Salzman (co-producer 1–8), Warren Huart (co-producer track 9)

Ace Frehley chronology
Origins Vol. 1 (2016)	Spaceman (2018)	Origins Vol. 2 (2020)

Singles from Spaceman
- 1. "Bronx Boy" Released: April 27, 2018; 2. "Rockin' with the Boys" Released: August 9, 2018; 3. "Mission to Mars" Released: May 28, 2019

Professional ratings
Review scores
Source	Rating
AllMusic	3.5/5 stars
Brave Words & Bloody Knuckles	8.0/10
Classic Rock	3.5/5 stars
Metal Hammer (GER)	5/7
Spectrum Culture	3/5 stars

Spaceman is the eighth studio album by American guitarist Ace Frehley, released on October 19, 2018. It features a guest appearance from Frehley's former Kiss bandmate Gene Simmons who also co-wrote two tracks.

The album features three alternative covers.

== Album information ==
Spaceman features a reunion of sorts with Frehley's former Kiss bandmate Gene Simmons, who co-wrote and played bass on the opener "Without You I'm Nothing". He also co-wrote "Your Wish Is My Command", which Simmons intended for Kiss to record. Simmons named Spaceman.

"Rockin' with the Boys" was mentioned as a Frehley song title for the upcoming Kiss album (before Music from "The Elder") by Kerrang! magazine in 1981. In a 2018 interview with Ken Sharp, Frehley confirms that it is partly the same song: "I wrote the chorus for "Rockin' With The Boys" in the '70s. But I could never come up with a good enough verse and bridge to make it a viable tune. I experimented and had several versions of that."

== Track listing ==
No.	Title	Writer(s)	Length
1.	"Without You I'm Nothing"	Ace Frehley, Gene Simmons	4:06
2.	"Rockin' with the Boys"	Frehley	4:15
3.	"Your Wish Is My Command"	Frehley, Simmons	3:38
4.	"Bronx Boy"	Frehley, Ronnie Mancuso	2:50
5.	"Pursuit of Rock and Roll"	Frehley	4:32
6.	"I Wanna Go Back" (Billy Satellite cover)	Danny Chauncey, Monty Byrom, Ira Walker	4:01
7.	"Mission to Mars"	Frehley, Tom Kunzman, Kait DiBenedetto, Ken Gullic	3:39
8.	"Off My Back"	Frehley	3:38
9.	"Quantum Flux"	Frehley	6:28
Total length:			37:07

== Personnel ==
- Ace Frehley – vocals, guitars (all); bass guitar (track 2, 4–5, 7–8); creative direction and design
- Gene Simmons – bass guitar (track 1)
- Scot Coogan – drums (track 1, 3–4, 7); background vocals (track 3–4)
- Alex Salzman – co-producer/recording engineer (tracks 1–8); background vocals (track 2–4); bass guitar (track 3, 6)
- Rachael Gordon – background vocals (track 2–3)
- Matt Starr – drums (track 2, 6, 9)
- Ronnie Mancuso – additional guitar (track 4, 7)
- Anton Fig – drums (track 5, 8)
- Warren Huart – recording engineer (track 9); harmony lead guitar and bass (track 9), mix (all tracks)
- Eric Gonzalez – mixing assistant
- Andrew Perez – mixing assistant
- Hayden Cluff – assistant engineer for Warren Huart
- Jay Gilbett – photographer
- Paul Grosso – creative direction and design
- Adam Ayhan – mastering

== Charts ==
Chart (2018)	Peak position
Belgian Albums (Ultratop Flanders)	115
Belgian Albums (Ultratop Wallonia)	87
German Albums (Offizielle Top 100)	45
Japanese Albums (Oricon)	123
Scottish Albums (Official Charts)	73
Spanish Albums (PROMUSICAE)	56
Swedish Albums (Sverigetopplistan)	20
Swiss Albums (Schweizer Hitparade)	28
US Billboard 200	49
