= Kiss Loves You =

- KISS Loves You North American DVD
- Directed by: Jim Heneghan
- Produced by: 8th Grade Films & SVT
- Cinematography: Harry Clark
- Distributed by: MVD
- Release date: April 8, 2004
- Running time: 73 minutes (DVD)
- Country: United States
- Language: English

Kiss Loves You is a 2004 documentary film directed by Jim Heneghan and co-produced by 8th Grade Films and Sveriges Television. The documentary chronicles the triumphs, tragedies and absurdities of a select group of Kiss fans over a 10-year period beginning in 1994, during which the band reunited in original greasepaint and costumes.

Kiss Loves You is named after an affirmation the band has used to conclude most of their live concerts since 1974.
