= Tod Howarth =

American musician

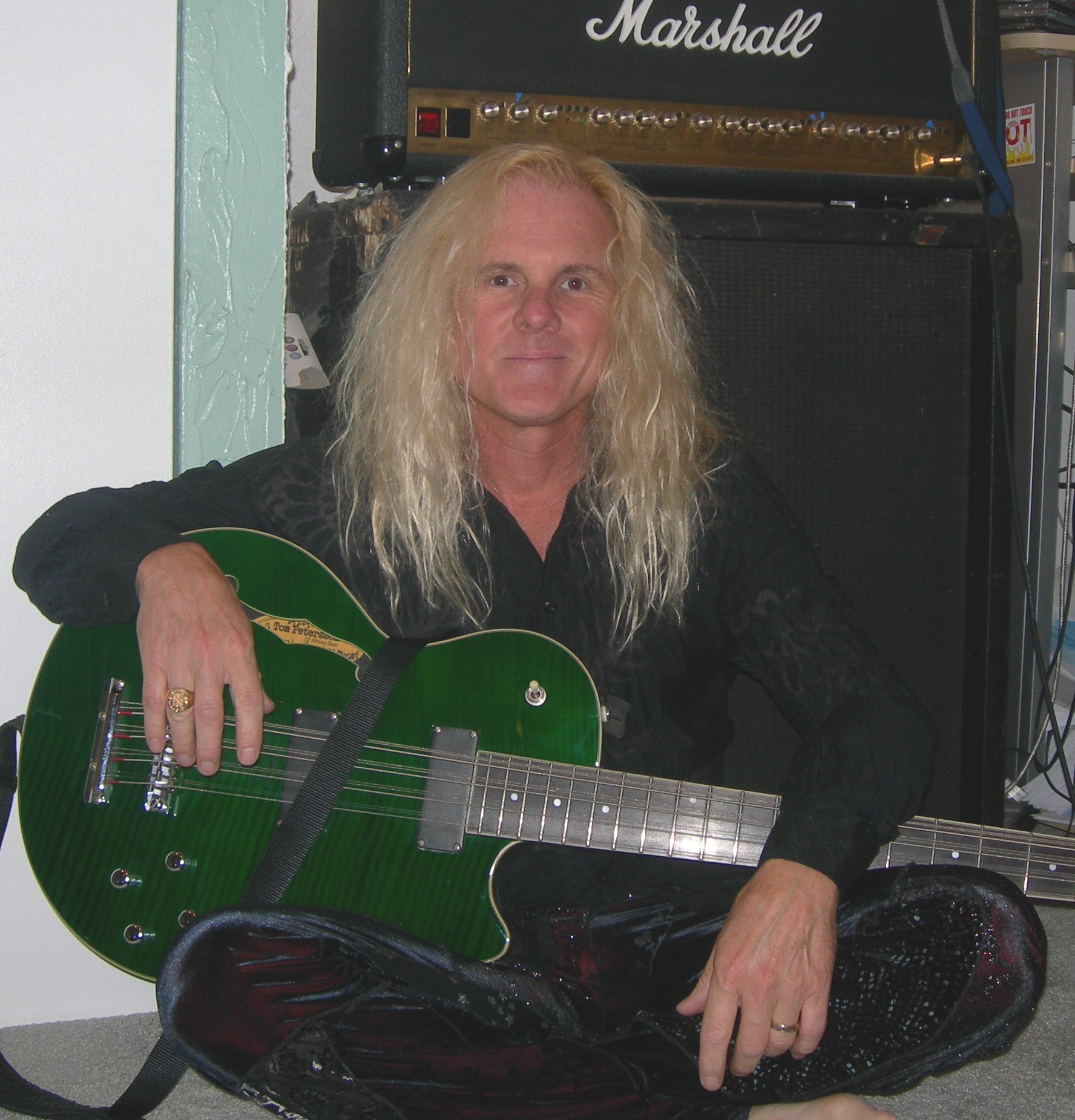
- Tod Howarth, 2009

Background information
- Born: September 24, 1957 (age 69); San Diego, California, U.S.
- Genres: Hard rock Heavy metal Power pop
- Occupations: Musician, songwriter, vocalist
- Instruments: Guitar, keyboards, vocals
- Years active: 1982–present
- Labels: Megaforce, Shock Records, Perris Records
- Website: www.todhowarth.com

Tod Howarth (born September 24, 1957) is an American rock musician from San Diego, California. He is best known as serving as a keyboardist, a guitarist, and second lead vocalist for the hard rock group Frehley's Comet, led by former Kiss guitarist Ace Frehley. The band recorded three albums and produced five music videos before the line-up ultimately dissolved, with Frehley moving back to solo efforts.

Howarth's music career began in the early 1980s with the group 707. He has also performed with Cheap Trick and Ted Nugent and released four solo albums, the first in 1995. He also provided background vocals for Nugent's Penetrator album in 1984, and Loudness' album Hurricane Eyes in 1987.

Howarth joined Cheap Trick again in 2008; at the 30th anniversary 2008 Budokan show, he was seen on stage playing the keyboard and supplying backing vocals. He was originally scheduled to participate in the 2008 Journey / Heart / Cheap Trick tour, but budget restrictions caused him to be unable to participate.

On December 14, 2008 Howarth released an acoustic version of the Frehley's Comet classic "Time Ain't Runnin' Out" exclusively on his MySpace page.

Howarth's latest solo album, Opposite Gods was released independently in April 2010. In June 2012, he released a video single on YouTube of his single "Cold Beach", filmed on location in the California desert. The video was shot and edited primarily by Vancouver producer Brian Sword.

In June, 2016, Howarth, along with ex-Frehley's Comet bassist, John Regan, ex-Skid Row drummer, Rob Affuso, and guitarist Pat Gasperini, released an album under the band name Four By Fate. Entitled Relentless, the album was released by The End Records.

Howarth also performs at charity events, such as Stand Down for veterans and their families.

== Solo discography ==
- Silhouette (1995)
- Cobalt Parlor (1997)
- West of Eight (2000)
- Winter (2002)
- Opposite Gods (2010)

=== Ace Frehley discography ===
- Frehley's Comet (July 7, 1987)
- Live+1 (February 1988)
- Second Sighting (May 24, 1988)
- 12 Picks (April 8, 1997)
- Loaded Deck (January 20, 1998)
- Greatest Hits Live (January 24, 2006)

== Four By Fate discography ==
- Relentless (June 3, 2016)

== 707 discography ==
- Mega Force (1982)
- The Bridge (2004)
- Greatest Hits Live (2005)

== Filmography ==
- Frehley's Comet Live+4 (1988) (VHS)
