= Jamie Oldaker =

American drummer (1951–2020)

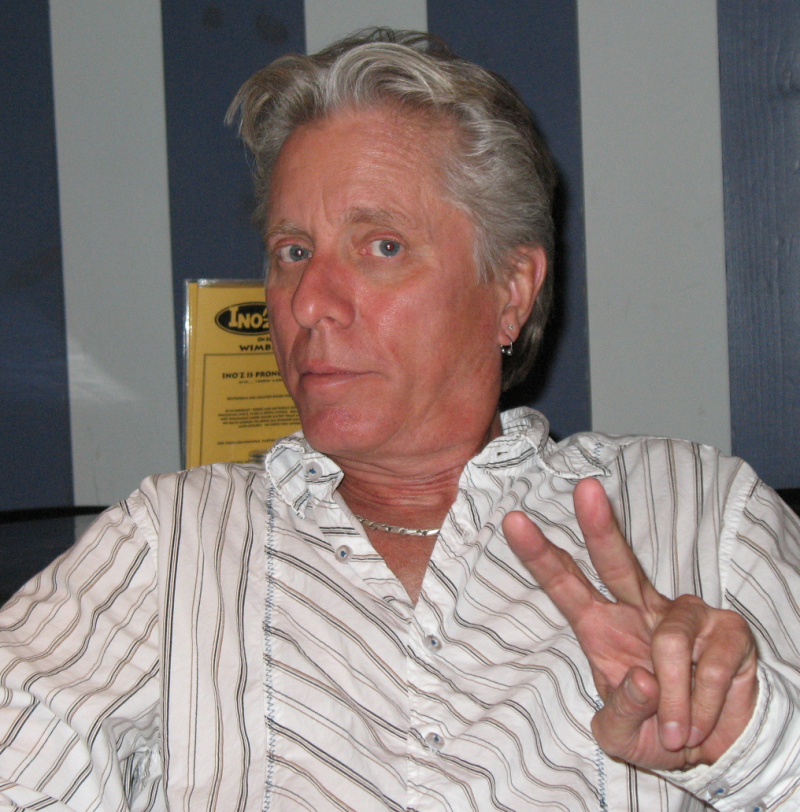
- Oldaker in 2006

Background information
- Born: September 5, 1951; Tulsa, Oklahoma, U.S.
- Died: July 16, 2020 (aged 68) Tulsa, Oklahoma, U.S.
- Genres: Alternative country; rock; blues; bluegrass
- Instruments: Drums, percussion
- Years active: 1971–2020
- Formerly of: Frehley's Comet, The Tractors
- Website: jamieoldaker.com

James Oldaker (September 5, 1951 – July 16, 2020) was an American rock music, blues rock and country music drummer and percussionist.

== Biography ==
James Oldaker was born in Tulsa, Oklahoma. One of the first bands that he was a member of was called the Rogues Five, who saw regional success in the mid-1960s and opened for other more popular bands such as the Doors at the Tulsa Convention Center. Oldaker and the Rogues Five were a regular band on local Tulsa television station KOTV's teen dance show: Dance Party.

After a stint in Bob Seger's band (on the album Back in '72), he then was with Leon Russell's band when he was asked by Eric Clapton to participate in the recording of 461 Ocean Boulevard. Oldaker remained a member of Clapton's studio and touring bands through 1979, when the entire band was dismissed. Oldaker would return to the Clapton band in 1983, playing on Clapton's Behind the Sun album, released in 1985, and performing with Clapton at Live Aid that same year, before leaving in 1986. Oldaker appears on the blues side of the live recording 24 Nights from 1990 and 1991. Not long after leaving Clapton's band, Oldaker briefly became a member of Kiss guitarist Ace Frehley's project, Frehley's Comet, appearing on the 1988 album Second Sighting. He was also a onetime member of the alt country band, The Tractors.

Oldaker recorded with musicians such as the Bellamy Brothers, Asleep at the Wheel, Peter Frampton, Stephen Stills, Leon Russell, Ace Frehley, Freddie King, and the Bee Gees. In August 2005, Oldaker released Mad Dogs & Okies on Concord Records, a collection celebrating the music and musicians of Oklahoma, which he produced. Collaborators include Eric Clapton, Vince Gill, J. J. Cale, Willie Nelson, Ronnie Dunn, and Bonnie Bramlett. Mad Dogs & Okies/Survivors was re-released in 2019 under Jamokie Productions.

== Personal life ==
Oldaker was involved in working with the organizers and the building of the OKPOP museum in Tulsa. He and his wife, Mary, were also hosts of an annual fundraiser, MOJO Fest, to raise money for the Tulsa Day Center for the Homeless.

Oldaker battled lung cancer in the 2010s, eventually becoming cancer-free by late-2019. However, the cancer had returned by the following year, and he died on July 16, 2020, in his hometown of Tulsa, Oklahoma, at age 68. In addition to his wife, he was survived by two children, Andrew and Olivia.

== Discography ==
- 1973 - Bob Seger - Back in '72
- 1974 - Eric Clapton - 461 Ocean Boulevard
- 1974 - The Gap Band - Magicians Holiday
- 1974 - Leon Russell - Stop All That Jazz
- 1974 - Freddie King - Burglar
- 1975 - Eric Clapton - E.C. Was Here
- 1975 - Eric Clapton - There's One in Every Crowd
- 1976 - Eric Clapton - No Reason to Cry
- 1977 - Eric Clapton - Slowhand
- 1977 - Freddie King - 1934-1976
- 1978 - Eric Clapton - Backless
- 1979 - Peter Frampton - Where I Should Be
- 1980 - Peter Frampton - Rise Up
- 1980 - Asleep At The Wheel - Framed
- 1982 - Marcy Levy - Marcella
- 1985 - Eric Clapton - Behind the Sun
- 1988 - Frehley's Comet - Second Sighting
- 1991 - Eric Clapton - 24 Nights
- 1994 - The Tractors - The Tractors
- 1995 - The Tractors - Have Yourself a Tractors Christmas
- 1995 - Peter Frampton - Frampton Comes Alive II
- 1998 - The Tractors - Farmers in a Changing World
- 2005 - Jamie Oldaker - Mad Dogs and Okies
