= Trouble Walkin' =

Studio album by Ace Frehley
- Released: October 13, 1989
- Recorded: 1988–1989
- Studios: Dreamland (Hurley, New York); Northlake Sound (New York)
- Genre: Hard rock
- Length: 44:27
- Labels: Atlantic; Megaforce
- Producers: Eddie Kramer; Ace Frehley; John Regan

Ace Frehley chronology
Second Sighting (1988)	Trouble Walkin' (1989)	Anomaly (2009)

Singles from Trouble Walkin'
- 1. "Do Ya" Released: 1989

Professional ratings
Review scores
Source	Rating
AllMusic	3/5 stars
Collector's Guide to Heavy Metal	8/10

Trouble Walkin' is the fourth solo album released by Ace Frehley. The album features guest performances by former Kiss drummer Peter Criss, as well as Skid Row members Sebastian Bach, Rachel Bolan and Dave Sabo.

The album peaked at number 102 on the Billboard 200 chart. The lone single, a cover of The Move's "Do Ya", did not chart. "Hide Your Heart", co-written by Paul Stanley, first appeared on Bonnie Tyler's Hide Your Heart album, and later appeared on Kiss' Hot in the Shade, which was released four days later. Lead vocals for "2 Young 2 Die" were provided by rhythm guitarist and backing vocalist Richie Scarlet. Former Kiss drummer Peter Criss was thanked for his contributions which were limited to backing vocals on "Hide Your Heart", "Trouble Walkin'", "2 Young 2 Die" and "Back to School".

The song "Trouble Walkin'" (which became the album's title) was written by Bill Wray and Phil Brown. Although it wasn't written for Ace Frehley, the song describes a character that is a dangerous "walking disaster" which seemed to fit the New York persona of the solo artist. The song didn't stem from Ace Frehley's then-humorous balance issues or a self-ascribed Spaceman "slowly getting used to [Earth's gravity]".

UK-based company Rock Candy Records reissued this album on CD in 2014.

== Track listing ==
All lead vocals by Ace Frehley, except where noted.

No.	Title	Writer(s)	Lead vocals	Length
1.	"Shot Full of Rock"	Frehley, Richie Scarlet		4:47
2.	"Do Ya"	Jeff Lynne		3:47
3.	"Five Card Stud"	Frehley, Marc Ferrari		4:01
4.	"Hide Your Heart"	Paul Stanley, Desmond Child, Holly Knight		4:33
5.	"Lost in Limbo"	Frehley, Scarlet		4:10
6.	"Trouble Walkin'"	Bill Wray, Phil Brown		3:08
7.	"2 Young 2 Die"	Frehley, Scarlet	Scarlet	4:29
8.	"Back to School"	Frehley, John Regan		3:43
9.	"Remember Me"	Frehley, James Carter Cathcart		5:01
10.	"Fractured III"	Frehley, Regan	(Instrumental)	6:48

== Personnel ==
Band members

- Ace Frehley - lead guitar, vocals, producer
- Richie Scarlet - rhythm guitar, vocals
- John Regan - bass guitar, synthesizer, producer
- Anton Fig - drums, percussion except on drums on "Trouble Walkin'"

Additional musicians

- Peter Criss - backing vocals and percussion on "Hide Your Heart", "Trouble Walkin'", "2 Young 2 Die" and "Back to School"
- Sandy Slavin - drums on "Trouble Walkin'"
- Sebastian Bach, Dave Sabo, Rachel Bolan, Peppi Castro, Al Fritsch, Pat Sommers - backing vocals

Production

- Eddie Kramer - producer, engineer, mixing at Bearsville Studios, Bearsville, NY
- David Cook, Mike Reiter, Eddie Solan, Chris Laidlaw - engineers
- Scott Mabuchi - mixing
- Ted Jensen - mastering at Sterling Sound, New York City
- Bob Defrin - art direction
- Larry Freemantle - cover design
- Brad Hitz - photography

== Charts ==
Album - Billboard (United States)

Year	Chart	Position
1989	The Billboard 200	102

== Releases ==
- Megaforce 82042-1 (LP)
- Megaforce 82042-2 (CD)
- Atlantic 82042 (CD re-release)
