= Richie Scarlet =

Guitarist (born 1955)

- Scarlet performing in 2026

Background information
- Also known as: The Emperor of Rock and Roll
- Born: 1955 (age 70–71); Katonah, New York, US
- Genre: rock and roll
- Occupations: musician; producer; songwriter
- Instrument: guitar
- Works: Trouble Walkin'; Leslie West Live!; Bring 'Em Bach Alive!; Masters of War
- Formerly of: Frehley's Comet; Mountain
- Website: www.richie-scarlet.com

Richie Scarlet (sometimes credited as Richie Scarlett [sic], b. 1955) is a musician from New York. Scarlet has written songs and recorded with both Ace Frehley and Peter Criss. Self-described as a "sort of hired gun", Scarlet is associated most with Frehley's Comet, but has recorded and toured with the likes of Sebastian Bach, members of the Alice Cooper group (like Dennis Dunaway), and Outlaws. Richie Scarlet also was a member of Mountain (in addition to Leslie West's and Corky Laing's solo groups). Scarlet has released many solo albums and produced records for several musical acts.

== Early years ==
Richie was born in Katonah, New York, in 1955 and was raised in the Kingsbridge section of the Bronx. He started on drums in various bands in school, and switched to guitar around age 13. After high school he formed Scarlet Fever, where he played guitar but did not sing. He legally changed his name to Scarlet at age 19. Then he started singing with the Richie Scarlet Band, then fronted a group called The Seducers (based out of Philadelphia). Scarlet played guitar for the Bonnie Parker Band in the late 1970s, where he learned about stagecraft and songwriting. Richie Scarlet performed in the late 1970s with a band around New York. Scarlet is nicknamed "The Emperor of Rock and Roll", as an homage to Elvis Presley (the King of Rock and Roll) who died in 1977. Scarlet was associated with Ed Roman and the East Coast Music Mall (Danbury, Connecticut) in the early 1980s.

== 1984–1989 ==
In 1984, Ace Frehley recruited Richie (aged 29 years) for a post-Kiss solo act. Scarlet and Frehley recorded demos for the Frehley's Comet including lyrics for "Breakout". He would also demo "Give it to Me Anyway", which wouldn't be officially recorded and released until 1997–98. Scarlet would be replaced by guitarist and vocalist Tod Howarth in December, 1986.

Richie Scarlet rejoined Ace Frehley's band in late 1988 for Trouble Walkin', contributing lead vocals to "2 Young 2 Die" (a reworked Scarlet song). He appeared with Ace Frehley in March 1989 on the TV show Headbangers Ball. Scarlet and Frehley would interact with members of Skid Row on that same show, building a long-lasting relationship.

== 1990–2001 ==
Scarlet toured with Frehley periodically from 1989 through 1995. In 1993, would begin a recording relationship with Leslie West and Mountain, starting with the recording of Leslie West Live! Richie Scarlet would be nicknamed "The Bat" on Mountain-related albums. In the late 1990s, Scarlet toured with the group Sebastian Bach & Friends, and contributed to Bring 'Em Bach Alive!.

Richie Scarlet released a solo album, Wise Guy from New York in 1997. That same year, Scarlet contributed to the Ace Frehley tribute album, Return of the Comet in 1997. In November, 2001, Scarlet joined Frehley's band for a September 11th benefit concert at the Hammerstein Ballroom.

== 2007–2019 ==
In 2007, Scarlet officially left Mountain after an eight-year stint. That same year, he recorded with Peter Criss, releasing the song "The Catman & the Emperor". In 2009, Scarlet performed with "supergroup" Blue, Scarlet, and Coupe; consisting of Albert Bouchard of Blue Oyster Cult and Dennis Dunaway of Alice Cooper Group. Scarlet recorded and performed with the group 5th Avenue Vampires from 2009 onward.

In 2012, Richie Scarlet released a solo album, I Plead the Fifth with Peter Gallinari. That same year, Scarlet collaborated with Dez Cadena. In 2016, Scarlet produced a metal album for The Chesterfield Kings. Also in 2016, Scarlet rejoined Ace Frehley on tour. Scarlet produced the 2018 Owl record, Things You Can't See. Richie Scarlet's wife, Joann Scarlet, suffered from ALS and died from the disease in 2018. Ace Frehley spoke at Joann's funeral.

Richie Scarlet, John Regan, Tod Howarth, and Steve "Budgie" Werner would perform under the banner of Return of the Comet in 2019. Starting that year, Scarlet joined Corky Laing's Mountain group and played through 2023.

== 2020–present ==
Scarlet in 2021

Richie Scarlet toured in 2022, 2025, and 2026 as the Richie Scarlet Band, with Louie Spagnola, Russ Wilson, and Peter Gallinari. In October, 2025, Scarlet attended the funeral of Ace Frehley. As of 2020, Richie Scarlet resides in Milbrook, New York.

== Partial discography ==
Solo albums

- Hit for Hit (1984)
- Wise Guy from New York (1997)
- Out of My Past (1999)
- The Insanity of Life (2002)
- Stage to Stage: Richie Scarlet Live (2003)
- Revelation Supreme (2006)
- Fever (2010)
- I Plead the Fifth (2012)
- Essentials Volume 1 (2015)
- Essentials Volume 2 (2024)

Solo singles and EPs

- "Eyes of an Angel" (1982)
- "The Catman & the Emperor" (with Peter Criss, 2021)

Videos

- Love in Tokyo Japan

Selected collaborations

- Trouble Walkin' (with Ace Frehley Band, 1989)
- Leslie West Live! (with Leslie West, 1993)
- Bring 'Em Bach Alive! (with Sebastian Bach, 1999)
- Mystic Fire (with Mountain, 2002)
- Masters of War (with Mountain, 2007)
