= Anton Fig =

South African drummer

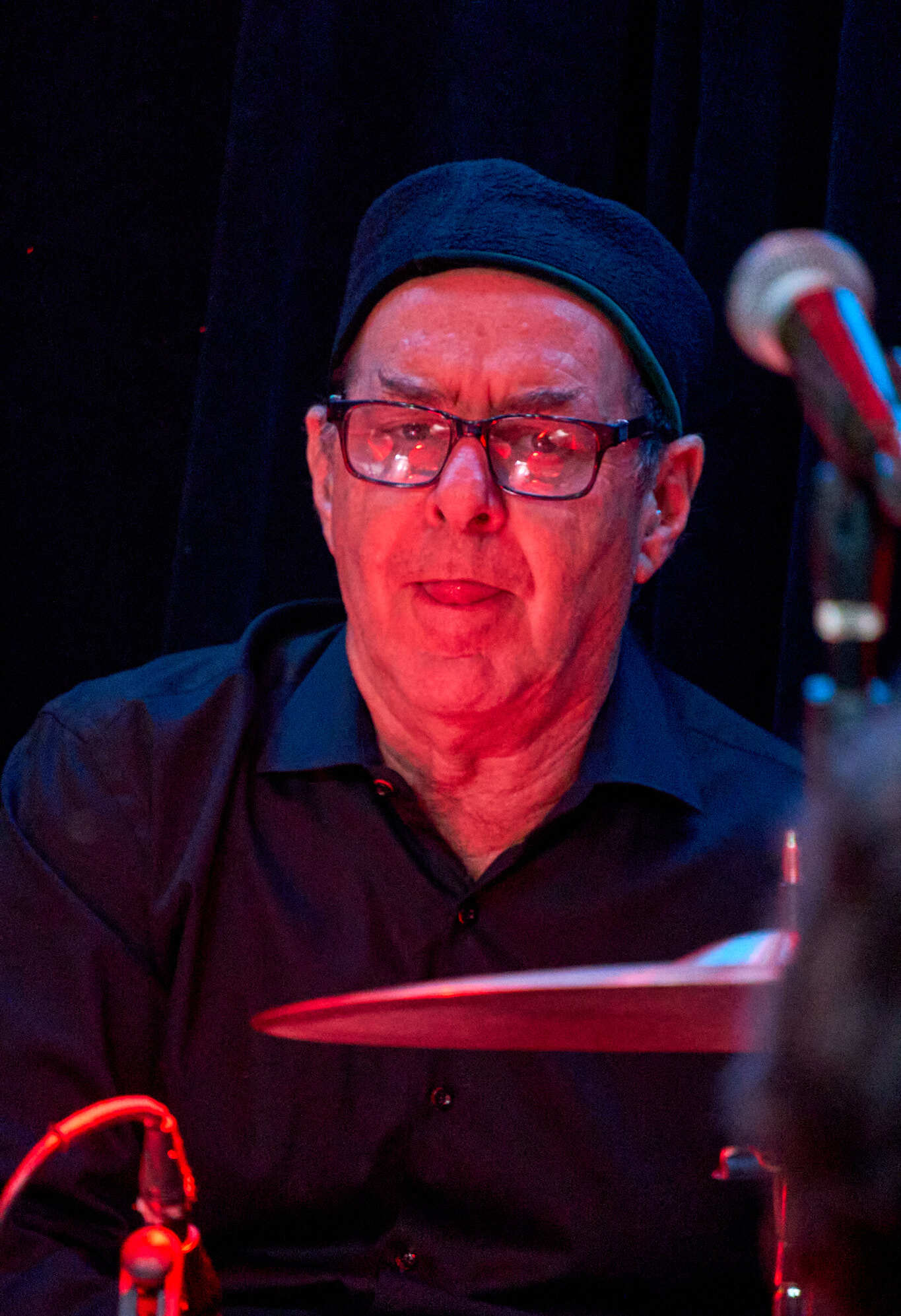
- Fig in 2014

Background information
- Born: 8 August 1952 (age 74); Cape Town, South Africa
- Occupation: Session musician
- Instruments: Drums; percussion
- Website: antonfig.com

Anton Fig (born 8 August 1952) is a South African session drummer and member of Paul Shaffer and the World's Most Dangerous Band. David Letterman, for whom the band served as house band on his late-night talk shows, often called Fig "Anton Zip" or "Buddy Rich Jr." Fig also worked with Kiss, Ace Frehley, and Joe Bonamassa.

== Early career ==
Fig was born in Cape Town, South Africa. He began playing drums at age four. After performing in numerous bands in Cape Town, becoming locally respected with bands like Hammak, he moved to Boston to further pursue his musical interests. His formal education included studies at the New England Conservatory of Music, where he studied jazz and classical music and graduated with honors in 1975. In 1976, he moved to New York City, where he began to work as a freelance musician.

Fig was a member of the band Spider during both its album releases in 1980 and 1981 as well as on its 1982 album under the name Shanghai, together with producer Beau Hill and songwriter Holly Knight.

Fig was the drummer on Ace Frehley's 1978 eponymous solo album and subsequently became a member of the then ex-Kiss lead guitarist's solo project Frehley's Comet from 1984 to 1987. Fig also played drums on all but one song on Kiss's 1979 album Dynasty and every song on its 1980 album Unmasked; the use of Fig to replace usual drummer Peter Criss (producers thought Criss, who had a drug problem, had seen a deterioration of his skills) upset Criss, to the point where, after appearing in promotional videos and tours through Unmasked, he left the band.

Other artists Fig has worked with include Bob Dylan, Warren Zevon, B. B. King, Booker T and The MGs, Peter Frampton, Joan Armatrading, Cyndi Lauper, Link Wray, John Waite, Robert Gordon, Eric Johnson, Beth Hart, Oz Noy, and Kix.

== David Letterman ==
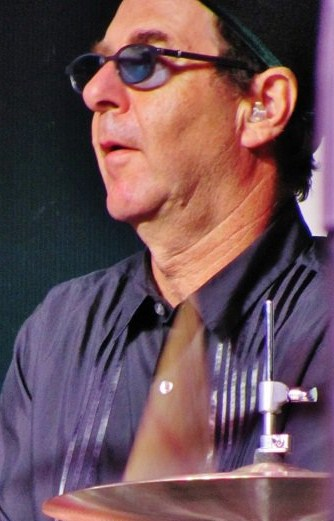
Fig in 2014

Fig became the drummer for the Paul Shaffer-led house band of David Letterman's late night television shows in 1986, when he debuted with "The World's Most Dangerous Band" on NBC's Late Night with David Letterman. When Letterman's show moved to CBS in 1993 and became Late Show with David Letterman, the band (and Fig) moved as well, adding a horn section and becoming known as the "CBS Orchestra".

During this tenure, Fig and the rest of the band played with artists including Miles Davis, James Brown, Bruce Springsteen, Steve Winwood, Bonnie Raitt, and Tony Bennett. Fig also played parts in several of the show's comic sketches, including the recurring gag "Anton Fig's Guess The Expiration Date", in which Fig would be blindfolded and fed a perishable food product and attempt to guess the expiration date on the item solely by tasting it. The CBS Orchestra also backed up artists in other venues, such as Stevie Wonder, Faith Hill, Little Richard, and, at the closing ceremonies of the 1996 Olympic Games in Atlanta, B. B. King. It also backed Al Green, Gloria Estefan, 'N Sync, and Eric Clapton for VH1's Save the Music concert at the White House.

The World's Most Dangerous Band is also the house band for the Rock and Roll Hall of Fame, and the backup band for The Concert for New York City, where it performed with David Bowie, Mick Jagger and Keith Richards, Eric Clapton and Buddy Guy, Macy Gray, and James Taylor.

On occasions when Shaffer was absent from The Late Show or guest-hosted, especially after previous substitute bandleader Warren Zevon died in 2003, Fig filled in as bandleader.

== Other projects ==
Some of the many recordings Fig has made include selections with Bob Dylan, Mick Jagger, Mr Scary, Cyndi Lauper, Madonna, Gary Moore, Shanghai, Ace Frehley, Joan Armatrading, Rosanne Cash, Joe Cocker, John Phillips, Warren Zevon, Sebastian Bach, Oz Noy, Jed Davis, Joe Satriani, Paul Butterfield, Link Wray, and Chris Spedding.

Fig replaced Peter Criss on the Kiss albums Dynasty (1979) and Unmasked (1980), playing drums on all tracks for both albums (except Criss's song on Dynasty, "Dirty Livin'"). Kiss's management attempted to cover up personnel problems within the band, so Fig was not credited until years later, and Criss appears in the video for "Shandi" from Unmasked.

As a freelance drummer, Fig has also played live with Paul Simon, Booker T and the MG's, The Thompson Twins at Live Aid, and Jim Keltner for Bob Dylan's 30th anniversary concert celebration. In 1996, he released a drum instructional video and book titled In the Groove and Late Night Drumming, respectively.

In 2002, Fig completed his first solo record, Figments. Produced and co-written by Fig, the record represents three years of work and includes Richie Havens, Brian Wilson, Ivan Neville, Sebastian Bach, Ace Frehley, Al Kooper, Chris Spedding, Donald "Duck" Dunn, Blondie Chaplin, Paul Shaffer, Chris Botti, Randy Brecker, and Richard Bona.

In 2006, Fig worked with Blackmore's Night on The Village Lanterne. In 2007, he worked with Joe Bonamassa on his album Sloe Gin, in 2009 on his Ballad of John Henry, and in 2014 on Different Shades of Blue.

On 4 May 2009, Fig joined Bonamassa's band for its debut appearance at the Royal Albert Hall in London, where Eric Clapton made a guest appearance. A DVD of the performance was released. Fig was featured on Ace Frehley's 2009 album Anomaly.

Since 2025, Fig has been the drummer in Bob Dylan's touring band, replacing Jim Keltner, playing on the Rough and Rowdy Ways World Wide Tour and on Willie Nelson's Outlaw Music Festival Tour.

== Discography ==
With Joan Armatrading

- Me Myself I (A&M, 1980)

With Mr Scary

- Haunted (2025)

With Frank Black

- Honeycomb (Black Porch, 2005)

With Joe Bonamassa

- Sloe Gin (J&R, 2007)
- The Ballad of John Henry (J&R, 2009)
- Black Rock (J&R, 2010)
- Dust Bowl (J&R, 2011)
- Driving Towards the Daylight (Provogue, 2012)
- Different Shades of Blue (Provogue, 2014)
- Blues of Desperation (J&R, 2016)
- Redemption (Provogue, 2018)
- Royal Tea (Provogue, 2020)
- Time Clocks (J&R, 2021)

With Martin Briley

- Dangerous Moments (Mercury, 1984)

With Paul Butterfield

- The Legendary Paul Butterfield Rides Again (Amherst, 1986)

With Rosanne Cash

- Rhythm & Romance (Columbia, 1985)

With The B. Christopher Band

- Surfing With A Vintage Lady (2021)

With Clarence Clemons

- Hero (Columbia, 1985)

With Joe Cocker

- Cocker (Capitol, 1986)

With Steve Cropper

- Fire It Up (Provogue, 2021)

With Rodney Crowell

- Street Language (CBS Records, 1986)

With Karla DeVito

- Is This a Cool World or What? (Epic, 1981)

With Bob Dylan

- Empire Burlesque (Columbia, 1985)
- Knocked Out Loaded (Columbia, 1986)

With Europe

- Bag of Bones (Edel, 2012)

With Peter Frampton

- Rise Up (A&M, 1980)

With Ace Frehley

- Ace Frehley (Casablanca, 1978)
- Frehley's Comet (Atlantic, 1987)
- Trouble Walkin' (Atlantic, 1989)
- Anomaly (Bronx Born, 2009)
- Spaceman (Entertainment, 2018)
- 10,000 Volts (MNRK Music Group, 2024)

With The Graces

- Perfect View (A&M Records, 1989)

With Josh Groban

- Awake (143, 2006)

With Beth Hart

- Bang Bang Boom Boom (Provogue, 2012)

With Beth Hart and Joe Bonamassa

- Don't Explain (J&R, 2011)
- Seesaw (J&R, 2013)
- Black Coffee (J&R, 2018)

With Mick Jagger

- She's the Boss (Columbia, 1985)

With Garland Jeffreys

- American Boy & Girl (A&M, 1979)

With Kiss

- Dynasty (Casablanca, 1979)
- Unmasked (Casablanca, 1980)
- Music from "The Elder" (Casablanca, 1981)(co-wrote Dark Light only)

With Al Kooper

- Rekooperation (Music Masters, 1994)
- Black Coffee (Favored Nations, 2005)
- White Chocolate (Sony, 2008)

With Cyndi Lauper

- She's So Unusual (Portrait, 1983)
- True Colors (Portrait, 1986)
- Hat Full of Stars (Epic, 1993)

With Andy LaVerne

- Severe Clear (SteepleChase, 1990)
- Standard Eyes (SteepleChase, 1990)

With Madonna

- Erotica (Warner Bros., 1992)

With Delbert McClinton

- Never Been Rocked Enough (Curb, 1992)

With Gary Moore

- After Hours (Charisma, 1992)

With Jennifer Rush

- Heart over Mind (Columbia, 1987)

With Joe Satriani

- Engines of Creation (Epic, 2000)

With Paul Shaffer

- Coast to Coast (Capitol, 1989)
- The World's Most Dangerous Party (SBK, 1993)

With Patty Smyth

- Never Enough (Columbia, 1987)

With Ronnie Spector

- Unfinished Business (Columbia, 1987)

With Chris Spedding

- Enemy Within (New Rose, 1986)

With Billy Squier

- Hear & Now (Capitol, 1989)

With Michael Monroe

- Not Fakin' It (1989)

With The Rolling Stones

- Dirty Work (Columbia, 1986)

With Henry Lee Summer

- Henry Lee Summer (Epic, 1988)

With Joanne Shaw Taylor

- Heavy Soul (Journeyman, 2024)

With Chris Thompson

- High Cost of Living (Atlantic Records, 1986)

With John Waite

- Rover's Return (EMI, 1987)

With The Williams Brothers

- Two Stories (Warner Bros., 1987)

With Warren Zevon

- My Ride's Here (Artemis, 2002)
