= Kiss Meets the Phantom of the Park =

1978 film

- Cover of the film's 1988 VHS release
- Genre: Fantasy; Horror; Musical
- Written by: Jan-Michael Sherman; Don Buday
- Directed by: Gordon Hessler
- Starring: Kiss; Anthony Zerbe; Deborah Ryan
- Music by: Hoyt Curtin
- Country of origin: United States
- Original language: English

Production
- Executive producer: Joseph Barbera
- Producers: Terry Morse, Jr.
- Production locations: Santa Clarita, California; Six Flags Magic Mountain - 26101 Magic Mountain Parkway, Valencia, California
- Cinematography: Robert Caramico
- Editor: Peter E. Berger
- Running time: 96 minutes
- Production companies: Hanna-Barbera Productions; KISS/Aucoin Productions
- Budget: $3 million (US)

Original release
- Network: NBC
- Release: October 28, 1978

Kiss Meets the Phantom of the Park (also known as Attack of the Phantoms in Europe and Kiss Phantoms in Italy) is a 1978 American television film starring American hard rock band Kiss and produced by Hanna-Barbera Productions. The movie's plot revolves around Kiss, who use their superpowers to battle evil inventor Abner Devereaux (Anthony Zerbe) and to save a California amusement park from destruction.

NBC aired the film at the height of Kiss's popularity in the United States. Due to the film's poor acting and semi-comedic script, most Kiss fans disliked the film. Despite the film's poor quality, it has attained cult film status. Most members of Kiss despised the film for making them appear buffoonish, despite Ace Frehley enjoying the production of the film. For years after its airing, no one who worked for the group was permitted to mention the film in their presence.

== Plot ==
At Magic Mountain, Abner Devereaux, the park's engineer and the creator of a series of animatronic attractions, is not pleased that his works are being overshadowed by an upcoming concert by Kiss. Calvin Richards, the park's owner, explains that the concert will generate much-needed revenue to make up for the quality control problems that have plagued Deveraux's creations. Melissa, a park guest, becomes concerned when her boyfriend Sam Farrell, a park employee and assistant to Devereaux, has gone missing. Meanwhile, three punks sabotage one of the rides and Deveraux is blamed for the incident.

Melissa goes to Devereaux's underground laboratory, which was the last place Sam was seen. Devereaux dismisses her after explaining that he has not seen Sam, but after she leaves the lab, he reveals that Sam has been placed under mind-control through the use of an electronic device on the back of his neck. The three punks enter the Chamber of Thrills, where they fall into traps set by Devereaux. Richards fires Devereaux for his erratic behavior and disregard for the guests' safety; because of this, Devereaux swears revenge upon Richards, the park, and Kiss—all of whom he blames for his misfortune.

Shortly after Kiss's first concert at the park, Devereaux attempts to discredit them by unleashing a robotic copy of Gene Simmons to wreak havoc on the park and the security guards. The band is questioned the next day, but no action is taken, causing the park's officials, including the police and Richards to apologize to them by pardoning Gene of sabotage. Melissa seeks help from the band to find Sam, unaware that the security pass she received from Devereaux is a tracking device. Devereaux has Sam break into the band's lair to try and steal their talismans, but the plan is foiled due to the force field on the talismans' case. Kiss sneak into the park to confront Devereaux, fighting off Devereaux's animatronic white monkeys in the process. Meanwhile, Sam manages to steal the talismans and delivers them to Devereaux, who then neutralizes Kiss with a ray gun. Kiss, having lost their powers, are imprisoned in the underground lab. Devereaux then sends his robotic Kiss copies in place of the real Kiss in order to ruin their concert and incite a riot. The real Kiss manages to retrieve their talismans, thereby regaining their powers. They escape and quickly head to the stage where they defeat the imposters and save the concert.

After the show, Kiss, Melissa and Richards confront Devereaux in the underground laboratory, only to discover that he has frozen in a catatonic state, seemingly revealing himself as the namesake "phantom" of the park. Paul Stanley removes the mind-control device from Sam's neck, turning him back to normal. Richards laments Devereaux's demise by saying, "He created Kiss to destroy Kiss...and he lost." An alternate take used the final dialogue "He created KISS...to defeat KISS...and in the end, it destroyed him."

== Cast ==
=== Members of Kiss ===
- Ace Frehley as himself/the Spaceman
- Gene Simmons as himself/the Demon
- Paul Stanley as himself/the Starchild
- Peter Criss as himself/the Catman

=== Others ===
- Anthony Zerbe as Abner Devereaux
- Carmine Caridi as Calvin Richards
- Deborah Ryan as Melissa
- John Dennis Johnston as Chopper
- John Lisbon Wood as Slime
- Lisa Jane Persky as Dirty Dee
- John Chappell as Sneed
- Terry Lester as Sam Farell
- Don Steele as himself
- Brion James as guard
- Michael Bell (Voice on screen of Peter Criss)

== Development ==
Kiss's commercial popularity was at its peak by 1978. The group's gross income in 1977 totaled $10.2 million. Creative manager Bill Aucoin felt, however, that the cycle of album releases and touring had taken Kiss as far as they could go, and that it was time to elevate the group's image to the next level. He formulated a plan to cast Kiss as superheroes, a process that began with the 1977 release of a Kiss comic book. The band agreed, and plans were developed for a Kiss film. Paul Stanley said, "It was sold to us as a cross between Star Wars and A Hard Days Night."

== Production ==
Filming for Kiss Meets the Phantom of the Park began in May 1978, and it was produced by Hanna-Barbera, known primarily for animation. Most of the picture was filmed at Magic Mountain in California, with additional filming taking place in the Hollywood Hills. Much of the production was rushed, and the script underwent numerous rewrites. All four members of Kiss were given crash courses on acting.

Before completing the script, screenwriters Jan Michael Sherman and Don Buday spent time with each Kiss member, to get a feel for how they each acted and spoke. Frehley, known for his eccentric behavior, said little to the pair but "Ack!" As a result, Frehley was not originally given any lines, except to interject "Ack!" at various points. In the first draft of the script, Frehley was described as "monosyllabic and super-friendly. Communicating largely through gestures and sounds, Ace might be best described as an other-galactic Harpo Marx." Upon learning of his lack of dialogue, Frehley threatened to leave the project. Soon after, lines other than his catchphrase "Ack!" were written for him.

The band, none of whom had any prior acting experience, had difficulty adjusting to the demands of filming. Frehley and Criss, in particular, became increasingly frustrated with the long periods of downtime normally associated with filmmaking. They were both also dealing with increasing levels of substance abuse.

Criss's dialogue had to be dubbed by voice actor Michael Bell (who had worked with producer Joseph Barbera on a number of past projects) because he refused to participate in post-production. The only time Criss's actual voice is heard is during an acoustic performance of "Beth". Criss denied this story, stating that he "went to all the looping".

On May 27, the last day of filming, Criss and tour manager Fritz Postlethwaite were involved in a serious car accident. Postlethwaite suffered burns but soon returned to work for Kiss. Criss's injuries were minor. On a few occasions, Frehley left the set during filming due to arguments with the film's director. In one scene that Frehley abandoned, his stunt double — African American Alan Oliney, who would later go on to stunt double for Eddie Murphy and Wesley Snipes, among others — can clearly be seen instead.

The concert depicted in the film was recorded in the parking lot of Magic Mountain on May 19, 1978, in front of a crowd of 8,000 people. Tickets for the concert were given out by local AM radio station KTNQ, where "The Real" Don Steele was a disc jockey. This is also the same radio station where Kiss made an appearance as DJs on Steele's radio program the previous year while in town to record Alive II at The Forum. The group performed a full concert, followed by lip-synched performances of some songs. "Rip and Destroy", an altered version of "Hotter than Hell" that was featured in the film, was not performed during the concert.

== Music ==
The music in the European release was performed by Kiss.

No.	Title	Writer(s)	Original release	Length
1.	"Radioactive"	Simmons	Gene Simmons (1978)	3:50
2.	"Almost Human"	Simmons	Love Gun (1977)	2:49
3.	"Mr. Make Believe"	Simmons	Gene Simmons (1978)	4:00
4.	"Man of 1,000 Faces"	Simmons	Gene Simmons (1978)	3:16
5.	"Rip and Destroy" ("Hotter Than Hell" with different lyrics)	Stanley	Hotter Than Hell (1974)	3:30
6.	"Rock 'n' Roll All Nite"	Simmons, Stanley	Dressed to Kill (1975)	2:49
7.	"Shout It Out Loud"	Stanley, Simmons, Ezrin	Destroyer (1976)	2:49
8.	"Easy Thing"	Criss, Stan Penridge	Peter Criss (1978)	3:53
9.	"That's the Kind of Sugar Papa Likes"	Criss, Penridge	Peter Criss (1978)	2:59
10.	"Beth"	Criss, Penridge	Destroyer (1976)	2:45
11.	"Love in Chains"	Stanley	Paul Stanley (1978)	3:34
12.	"I Stole Your Love"	Stanley	Love Gun (1977)	3:04
13.	"Hold Me, Touch Me"	Stanley	Paul Stanley (1978)	3:40
14.	"Fractured Mirror"	Frehley	Ace Frehley (1978)	5:25
15.	"New York Groove"	Ballard	Ace Frehley (1978)	3:01
16.	"Hooked on Rock 'n' Roll"	Criss, Penridge, Poncia	Peter Criss (1978)	3:37
17.	"Classical Guitar Segue"	John Shane Howell	Gene Simmons (1978)	-
18.	"It Must Be That Look in Her Eyes"	The Golden Staters	The Golden Staters (1972)	1:56

== Release and reception ==
Before the film's airing, a private screening was held for Kiss, as well as their management and friends. Despite the positive reactions from all in attendance, Kiss hated the film for the buffoonish way it made them appear. For years after its airing, no one who worked for the group was permitted to mention the film in their presence.

In 1979, AVCO Embassy Pictures released Kiss Meets the Phantom of the Park in cinemas outside the United States, with translations of the title Attack of the Phantoms. In some countries—Italy, in particular—the film was titled Kiss Phantoms. The theatrical release featured a vastly different version, with several scenes that did not appear in the original television airing added to the cut.

The overseas film's overall soundtrack also differed from the original—much of the Hanna-Barbera fight music was replaced by music from the band's catalog, primarily from their four solo albums. In some edits, the promotional videos for "I Was Made for Lovin' You" and "Sure Know Something" were also edited into the film.

In recent years, Kiss's public statements concerning the film have been a mixture of bemusement and disgust. On VH1's When Kiss Ruled the World, Simmons stated that "It's a classic movie [. . .] if you're on drugs," and Frehley said that "I couldn't stop laughing from the beginning of the movie to the end". In an early-1990s interview, Simmons compared the film to Plan 9 from Outer Space, joking that the two films would make a perfect drive-in double feature.

In the years since its initial airing, Kiss Meets the Phantom of the Park has achieved cult status, mainly among Kiss fans. The European edit of the film (which removes most of Ace Frehley's dialogue) is available on DVD as part of Kissology Volume Two: 1978–1991, a collection of concerts and television appearances. Previously, availability was limited to two brief VHS releases in the 1980s and a laserdisc release in 1991. In 2005, distributor Cheezy Flicks attempted to release the original TV version of the film on DVD, but due to legal issues, the disc was quickly pulled; copies purchased during the release are rare.

In Australia, the film, titled Kiss and the Attack of the Phantoms, was initially popular. The most noticeable difference in the Australian release was the inclusion of "New York Groove" as background music during the rampage through the park.

Frehley later stated that he had tons of fun while shooting the film, although he has also claimed that both he and Peter Criss were "loaded" on alcohol and cocaine during production of the film.

== See also ==
- Scooby-Doo! and Kiss: Rock and Roll Mystery, a 2015 animated movie that shares similar plot points
