= Tomorrow (Kiss song) =

- cover art from Japanese release

Single by Kiss

from the album Unmasked
- Released: October 31, 1980
- Recorded: The Record Plant, New York City: 1980
- Genre: Power pop
- Length: 3:16
- Label: Casablanca NB-2299 AS (US)
- Songwriter(s): Paul Stanley, Vini Poncia
- Producer(s): Vini Poncia

Kiss singles chronology
"Talk to Me" (1980)	"Tomorrow" (1980)	"Is That You?" (1980)

"Tomorrow" is a song by the American rock band Kiss, released on their eighth studio album, Unmasked. It was released as the third single of the album on November 1, 1980. The song was never performed live.

== Background ==
"Tomorrow" was written by the band's rhythm guitarist Paul Stanley and the album producer Vini Poncia. Although Gene Simmons is the bass guitarist in the band, Stanley played bass guitar on the track (he also played bass on "Easy As It Seems"). The song was in most countries released as third single, after "Shandi" and "Talk to Me", but in the U.S. it was released as second single ("Talk to Me" wasn't released there). It only managed to chart in Germany, reaching number 70.

Record World said that "tight harmony vocals and power-laden, throbbing guitars deliver a triumphant hook."

== Track listing ==
=== International single ===
- A-side - "Tomorrow"
- B-side - "Naked City"

=== Austrian and German single ===
- A-side - "Tomorrow"
- B-side - "Is That You?"

=== Mexican single EP ===
Side 1:

- "Tomorrow"
- "Sure Know Something"

Side 2:

- "Christine Sixteen"
- "She"

== Personnel ==
- Paul Stanley – lead vocals, all guitars, bass
- Anton Fig – drums
- Vini Poncia – keyboards, clapping, backing vocals

== Charts ==
Chart (1980)	Peak position
West Germany (GfK)	70
