= Talk to Me (Kiss song) =

Single by Kiss

from the album Unmasked
- Released: August 24, 1980
- Recorded: The Record Plant, New York City: 1980
- Genre: Hard rock, power pop
- Length: 4:00
- Label: Casablanca
- Songwriter(s): Ace Frehley
- Producer(s): Vini Poncia

Kiss singles chronology
"Shandi" / "She's So European" (1980)	"Talk to Me" / "Naked City" (1980)	"Tomorrow" / "Naked City" (1980)

"Talk to Me" is a song by American hard rock band Kiss, released in 1980 on their eighth studio album Unmasked. The song, never released as a single in the US, was released as a single worldwide on November 1, 1980. The song broke the top 40 in several countries, reaching the highest position in Switzerland, at #10. "Talk to Me" was played only when Ace Frehley was a member of the band.

American glam punk band Peppermint Creeps covered "Talk to Me" for their Cover Up album in 2007.

== Background ==
"Talk to Me" is one of three songs from the album that Ace Frehley wrote and sings on. The album also features most of Frehley's material, who got more involved in songwriting after his solo album was released. Although Paul Stanley and Gene Simmons decided to make a pop-rock album (unusual for Kiss), Frehley's compositions remained hard rock, as much as they could be. After Peter Criss' departure, Frehley would be often out-voted 2-1 by Simmons and Stanley (Eric Carr was not a partner in the band as others were, but rather an employee), who then decided to make a pop-rock album. "Talk to Me" is one of only two songs from the album not to be co-written by producer Vini Poncia, with other being another Frehley song "Two Sides of the Coin". Frehley also played bass guitar on the song, instead of Simmons, who is the bassist in the band. Simmons did not play bass guitar on any of Frehley's compositions, as well as on some of Stanley's. This song is in Open G tuning for guitar.

"Talk to Me" was never released as a single in the US, but was a top 40 hit in Australia, the Netherlands, Germany, and Switzerland (#10). The song would be usually released with "Naked City" as a B-side. In Japan, it was released with "Easy As It Seems" as a B-side because "Naked City" was already released as a B-side for "Tomorrow". The band filmed a lip-synched performance video for West German television. On November 21, the band performed at Sydney Showground. The concert was filmed and broadcast as "The Inner Sanctum". Although the concert was never released as a live album, performances of "Talk to Me" and "New York Groove" have appeared on Kiss albums ("Talk to Me" on The Box Set and "New York Groove" on You Wanted the Best, You Got the Best!!).

== Live performances ==
"Talk to Me" was performed during the Unmasked Tour and, like the whole album, was ignored by the band during the 1980s. During the Asian and Australian leg of the Kiss Farewell Tour, Kiss performed the song. The song has not been performed since. Frehley also performed the song while on a tour across Australia.

== Appearances ==
"Talk to Me" has appeared on following albums:

- Unmasked - studio version
- The Box Set - live version
- Gold - studio version
- Ikons - studio version

Covers:

== Track listing ==
=== UK and Irish single ===
- A-side - "Talk to Me"
- B-side - "She's So European"

=== International single ===
- A-side - "Talk to Me"
- B-side - "Naked City"

=== Japan single ===
- A-side - "Talk to Me"
- B-side - "Easy As It Seems"

== Personnel ==
- Ace Frehley – lead vocals, all guitars, bass
- Anton Fig – drums
- Vini Poncia – keyboards, backing vocals
- Paul Stanley – backing vocals

== Charts ==
Chart (1980)	Peak position
Australian Singles (Kent Music Report)	39
Netherlands (Single Top 100)	39
Switzerland (Schweizer Hitparade)	10
West Germany (GfK)	32
