= Dynasty (Kiss album) =

1979 studio album by Kiss

Studio album by Kiss
- Released: May 23, 1979
- Recorded: January–February 1979
- Studios: Electric Lady and Record Plant, New York City
- Genres: Hard rock; disco
- Length: 39:19
- Label: Casablanca
- Producer: Vini Poncia

Kiss chronology
| Double Platinum (1978) | Dynasty (1979) | Unmasked (1980) |

Singles from Dynasty
- 1. "I Was Made for Lovin' You" Released: May 1979; 2. "Sure Know Something" Released: August 1979; 3. "Dirty Livin'" Released: 1979; 4. "Magic Touch" Released: January 1980; 5. "2,000 Man" Released: February 1980

Dynasty is the seventh studio album by American rock band Kiss, produced by Vini Poncia and released on May 23, 1979 by Casablanca Records. A departure from the band's hard rock style, the album incorporates pop and disco. Drummer and founding member Peter Criss only performs on "Dirty Livin'", his last recording with the band until Psycho Circus (1998). While a commercial success, going platinum in five countries, the album's critical reception was mixed, and the supporting "Return of Kiss" tour saw a marked decline in attendance.

== Background ==
The album and the following tour were billed as the "Return of Kiss", as the band had not released a studio album since Love Gun in 1977. Instead, the band released their second live album, Alive II, that same year, and each member had recorded eponymous solo albums, which were simultaneously released on September 18, 1978.

Before recording the album, the Kiss members were working separately on various demos:

- Peter Criss recorded and submitted a four-track demo with the songs "Out of Control", "Rumble", "Dirty Livin' " and "There's Nothing Better". "Dirty Livin' " made it to Dynasty, while "Rumble" remains unreleased officially by the band but has surfaced on the internet as a bootleg. The other two songs ended up on his 1980 solo album Out of Control.
- Ace Frehley recorded and submitted a five-track demo with "Hard Times", "Save Your Love", a cover of "2000 Man", "Backstage Pass" and "Insufficient Data". Three of the songs are on Dynasty, while the last two remain unreleased.
- Gene Simmons wrote and recorded a large number of demos, including five songs with members of the band Virgin, drummer Chuck Billings and guitarist Tommy Moody. Billings has identified the songs "I Have Just Begun to Fight", "Reputation" and "Bad Bad Lovin" as from the demo he played on, in addition to the two songs credited to Simmons on "Dynasty".
- Paul Stanley wrote songs with Desmond Child: one called "The Fight" was released on a Desmond Child & Rouge album; and one called "Tonight" formed the verses of "I Was Made for Lovin' You", combined with a chorus written by Stanley and Vini Poncia. "Sure Know Something" was written after Poncia had joined the project and a recording shows how the song was developed from a basic homemade demo in the studio with the band (except Frehley) and Poncia contributing.

Criss's disco influenced demo of his song "Dirty Livin'" (written in 1971) set the direction for the album project and Simmons and Stanley were briefly in contact with disco producer Giorgio Moroder, a friend of the band's manager Bill Aucoin, before deciding on Vini Poncia.

== Recording ==
After pre-production and rehearsals were completed, Poncia (who had produced Peter Criss) decided that Criss's drumming was substandard, an opinion shared by Stanley and Simmons. Criss was hindered by injuries to his hands that he had suffered in a 1978 car accident. Kiss hired the South African-born studio drummer Anton Fig, who played on Ace Frehley, to play on the Dynasty sessions. "On Dynasty, Peter was pretty much out of commission through drugs and alcohol, and he was not being nice to most people. I wouldn't point to it as a classic Kiss album." Except for his song "Dirty Livin'" (a rewrite of a song of the same title demoed during his pre-Kiss days in Lips), Criss does not play drums on the album, and he did not perform on another Kiss album until he played one song on Psycho Circus in 1998. Fig was again hired to replace Criss during recording sessions for the following album, Unmasked. Eric Carr was hired as Criss's permanent replacement before the Unmasked Tour began.

Frehley, who himself left the band three years later, played a bigger role than Simmons on Dynasty, singing three songs, "Hard Times", "Save Your Love" and a cover version of the Rolling Stones' song "2000 Man". Frehley is the only Kiss member to appear on those three songs, except for occasional backing vocals by Stanley. Although Frehley had frequently sung backing vocals and had written the Kiss classics "Cold Gin" and "Parasite", he had only previously been lead singer on his songs "Shock Me" on Love Gun, and "Rocket Ride" on the studio side of Alive II, as he lacked confidence in his ability as a lead singer.

Stanley's "I Was Made for Lovin' You" was one of the band's most successful singles, peaking at No. 11 on the American Billboard Hot 100 chart. In eleven countries around the world, it reached the No. 1 or No. 2 spot. It was the first Kiss single to have a disco remix, as a 7-minute and 54-second version was released on a 12-inch single. He also sang on "Sure Know Something" and "Magic Touch", where he also plays all guitars and bass. In contrast, Simmons sings lead vocals on only two songs: "Charisma" (which became a major hit in Mexico) and "X-Ray Eyes".

== Release ==
Dynasty went on sale May 23, 1979 through Casablanca Records, becoming the band's sixth best selling album, and the last certified platinum by the RIAA until the release of Lick It Up four years later. Also earning platinum status in Australia, the Netherlands and New Zealand, the album was even more popular in Canada, selling over 200,000 copies. It reached the top ten on the US Billboard 200, and in Australia, France and New Zealand, also topping the charts in the Netherlands.

Five singles were released from the album, tied with Unmasked as the most in the band's discography. The aforementioned "I Was Made for Lovin' You" was the lead single, and became a smash hit on the pop singles chart. The second single, "Sure Know Something" wasn't as successful, but still reached No. 47 on the US Billboard Hot 100, and was a top ten hit in Australia and the Netherlands. The third and fifth singles, "Dirty Livin'" and "2,000 Man" respectively, weren't released in the United States and failed to chart, but the fourth single "Magic Touch" was another hit in the Netherlands, peaking at No. 20.

Including a colorful jacket cover which is a collage of photos taken from the photo session and not a group shot as it appears, the label of Dynasty shows a portrait of all four members instead of the usual Casablanca label. Inserts included a merchandise order form and a full-color poster. The album artwork was reused on the German release of the single "Sure Know Something", but with a green border instead of gray.

== Critical reception ==
Professional ratings
Review scores
| Source | Rating |
|---|---|
| AllMusic | 3/5 stars |
| Collector's Guide to Heavy Metal | 4/10 |
| The Daily Vault | C− |
| Encyclopedia of Popular Music | 2/5 stars |
| Pitchfork | 2.0/10 |
| The Rolling Stone Album Guide | 1/5 stars |
| Uncut | 1/5 stars |

Dynasty received generally mixed reviews from contemporary and modern critics. According to David Fricke of Rolling Stone, most of the album's problems come from Poncia's production, which "has smothered most of the fire in the classic Kiss sound, reducing the guitars, drums and even Gene Simmons’ bloody howl to a pseudosophisticated whimper." He notes the disco influence on songs like "I Was Made for Lovin' You" and "Dirty Livin'" and gives the band credit for trying something new, but insists "only Stanley's "Sure Know Something" is salvaged — and that by one of the [new] record’s few memorable hooks." Stephen Thomas Erlewine of AllMusic pinpoints the album for beginning the band's transition away from heavy metal toward pop. He also criticized the glossy production, adding the songs "Charisma", "Magic Touch", "Hard Times" and "2,000 Man" suffer from it. Erlewine concludes that it's "not a horrible album (that distinction would go to 1981's Music from "The Elder"), but certainly not on par with such classics as Hotter than Hell, Destroyer, or Love Gun." Christopher Thelen of The Daily Vault goes against the common opinion that Dynasty is disco, declaring aside from "I Was Made for Lovin' You", it's more of an AOR album with softer-rock numbers like "Sure Know Something". He critiques "Magic Touch" and "Save Your Love" for lacking the bite Kiss had in their early material. Thelen concludes that "in a way, you can’t help but feel sorry for Kiss, personal problems aside," with the popularity of disco and punk rock making the band's anthemic hard rock stick out like a sore thumb.

Some modern reviews of Dynasty are more positive, with Ultimate Classic Rock claiming "many of the tracks are worth a re-listen" especially "Sure Know Something" which is described as "moving and melodic." Also praised is Ace Frehley's guitar work, who "riding high after releasing by far the most creatively successful of the solo albums, keeps his streak intact with some strong tunes" such as "2,000 Man" and the life on the streets tale "Hard Times". American-Japanese guitarist Marty Friedman, formerly of Megadeth, ranked all Kiss records on his social media, putting the album at #12 and stating "if you ignore the first two songs and the blank back cover, the album is a pretty enjoyable and accurate time capsule of that time period." Still, he wishes there was more "harder rock" songs.

Gene Simmons was asked for his thoughts on Dynasty during an interview with Good Day Sacramento. "Well, when people talk about that record [being] hit-or-miss, it was a multi-platinum record, so that's called a hit," he continues "there are some songs that are pop[-flavored] — yeah, by definition it's called a hit." Despite this, he hates performing "I Was Made For Lovin' You" because he is forced to sing like his grandmother, referring to his part, "do, do, do, do, do, do, do, do, do."

== Track listing ==
All credits adapted from the original release.

Side one
| No. | Title | Writer(s) | Lead vocals | Length |
|---|---|---|---|---|
| 1. | "I Was Made for Lovin' You" | Paul Stanley, Vini Poncia, Desmond Child | Stanley | 4:29 |
| 2. | "2,000 Man" (The Rolling Stones cover) | Mick Jagger, Keith Richards | Ace Frehley | 4:54 |
| 3. | "Sure Know Something" | Stanley, Poncia | Stanley | 4:00 |
| 4. | "Dirty Livin'" | Peter Criss, Stan Penridge | Criss | 4:27 |

Side two
| No. | Title | Writer(s) | Lead vocals | Length |
|---|---|---|---|---|
| 5. | "Charisma" | Gene Simmons, Howard Marks | Simmons | 4:25 |
| 6. | "Magic Touch" | Stanley | Stanley | 4:41 |
| 7. | "Hard Times" | Frehley | Frehley | 3:30 |
| 8. | "X-Ray Eyes" | Simmons | Simmons | 3:46 |
| 9. | "Save Your Love" | Frehley | Frehley | 4:41 |
| Total length: | | | | 39:19 |

== Personnel ==
=== Kiss ===
- Paul Stanley – vocals, rhythm guitar; lead guitar on "Sure Know Something" and "Magic Touch"; bass on "Magic Touch"
- Gene Simmons – vocals, bass except on "Magic Touch", "2,000 Man", "Hard Times", and "Save Your Love"; rhythm guitar on "X-Ray Eyes"
- Ace Frehley – vocals, lead guitar; all guitars and bass on "2,000 Man", "Hard Times" and "Save Your Love"
- Peter Criss – vocals and drums only on "Dirty Livin'"

=== Additional personnel ===
- Anton Fig – drums (except "Dirty Livin'")
- Vini Poncia – keyboards, percussion, backing vocals

=== Technical personnel ===
- Vini Poncia – producer
- Jay Messina – engineer, mixing
- Jon Mathias, Jim Galante – assistant engineers
- George Marino – mastering
- Francesco Scavullo – cover and poster photo
- Howard Marks Advertising Inc. – design

== Charts ==
=== Weekly charts ===
| Chart (1979–80) | Peak position |
|---|---|
| Australian Albums (Kent Music Report) | 2 |
| Austrian Albums (Ö3 Austria) | 13 |
| Canada Top Albums/CDs (RPM) | 6 |
| Dutch Albums (Album Top 100) | 1 |
| Finnish Albums (The Official Finnish Charts) | 29 |
| French Albums (SNEP) | 2 |
| German Albums (Offizielle Top 100) | 13 |
| Italian Albums (Musica e Dischi) | 16 |
| Japanese Albums (Oricon) | 21 |
| New Zealand Albums (RMNZ) | 2 |
| Norwegian Albums (VG-lista) | 34 |
| Swedish Albums (Sverigetopplistan) | 17 |
| UK Albums (Official Charts) | 50 |
| US Billboard 200 | 9 |

=== Year-end charts ===
| Chart (1979) | Position |
|---|---|
| German Albums (Offizielle Top 100) | 32 |
| New Zealand Albums (RMNZ) | 14 |
| Australian Albums (Kent Music Report) | 3 |

| Chart (1980) | Position |
|---|---|
| German Albums (Offizielle Top 100) | 19 |
| Australian Albums (Kent Music Report) | 15 |

== Certifications ==
| Region | Certification | Certified units/sales |
|---|---|---|
| Australia (ARIA) | Platinum | 50,000^{^} |
| Canada (Music Canada) | 2× Platinum | 200,000^{^} |
| Germany (BVMI) | Gold | 250,000^{^} |
| United States (RIAA) | Platinum | 1,000,000^{^} |
| Mexico (AMPROFON) | Gold | 100,000^{^} |
| Netherlands (NVPI) | Platinum | 100,000^{^} |
| New Zealand (RMNZ) | Platinum | 15,000^{^} |
^{^} Shipments figures based on certification alone.
