= Let Me Rock You =

Studio album by Peter Criss
- Released: June 1, 1982
- Recorded: 1982
- Studios: Conway (Hollywood, California)
- Genre: Soft rock
- Length: 37:30
- Label: Casablanca Records
- Producer: Vini Poncia

Peter Criss chronology
Out of Control (1980)	Let Me Rock You (1982)	Cat #1 (1994)

Singles from Let Me Rock You
- 1. "Tears" Released: 1982

Alternative cover
- Japanese album cover

Professional ratings
Review scores
Source	Rating
Allmusic	2.5/5 stars

Let Me Rock You is the third solo studio album released by American musician and former Kiss drummer Peter Criss. Due to poor sales for his previous album, Out of Control, Let Me Rock You was not released in the United States until 1998, when it was reissued on CD. The album was produced by Vini Poncia, who previously produced Criss's 1978 solo album (officially released as a Kiss album). Let Me Rock You features the song "Feels Like Heaven", written by Criss' former Kiss bandmate, Gene Simmons. The album cover features Peter Criss for the first time without his Kiss makeup, as he did not appear on the cover of Out of Control. One year later, Kiss also decided to take off their makeup for their Lick It Up album.

Only one single from the album was released— "Tears" (with a cover of John Lennon's "Jealous Guy" as the B-side). Vinnie Cusano co-wrote the song; the same year the album was released, Cusano became known as Vinnie Vincent, replacing Kiss guitarist Ace Frehley in time for the Lick It Up album. Singer-songwriter John Waite later covered "Tears" on his 1984 Gold-certified album, No Brakes, turning the song into a top-40 hit in the U.S.

The album charted for two weeks in Norway, peaking at #29.

== Track listing ==
No.	Title	Writer(s)	Length
1.	"Let It Go"	Tommy Faragher, Davey Faragher, Brie Howard	4:05
2.	"Tears"	Vinnie Cusano, Adam Mitchell	3:36
3.	"Move on Over"	Peter Criss, Vini Poncia	3:48
4.	"Jealous Guy"	John Lennon	3:58
5.	"Destiny"	Charlie Midnight, Kash Monet, Jeff Schoen	4:11
6.	"Some Kinda' Hurricane"	Russ Ballard	4:04
7.	"Let Me Rock You"	Ballard	3:37
8.	"First Day in the Rain"	Steve Stevens	3:32
9.	"Feels Like Heaven"	Gene Simmons	3:43
10.	"Bad Boys"	Criss, Jim Roberge	3:28
Total length:			37:30

== Personnel ==
- Peter Criss – vocals, drums
- Michael Landau – guitars
- Steve Stevens – guitars
- Steve Lukather – guitars
- Caleb Quaye – guitars
- Bobby Messano – guitars, backing vocals
- Phil Grande – guitars
- John "Cooker" Lo Presti – bass
- Davey Faragher – bass
- Michael Braun – guest drums
- Dennis Conway – guest drums
- James Newton Howard – keyboards, synthesizer
- Jai Winding – keyboards
- Jim Roberge – keyboards
- Ed Walsh – synthesizer
- Vini Poncia – backing vocals
- Gene Simmons – backing vocals
- Rory Dodd – backing vocals
- Eric Troyer – backing vocals
- Mark Kreider – backing vocals
- Suzanne Fellini – backing vocals
