= Dynasty Tour =

1979 concert tour by Kiss

- Tour by Kiss
- Poster to the concert in Springfield, USA
- Associated album: Dynasty
- Start date: June 15, 1979
- End date: December 16, 1979
- Legs: 2
- No. of shows: 82

Kiss concert chronology
- Alive II Tour (1977–1978); Dynasty Tour (1979); Unmasked Tour (1980)

The Dynasty Tour was a concert tour by the rock band Kiss. It was also the final tour with original member Peter Criss until the Alive/Worldwide Tour in 1996.

== Background ==
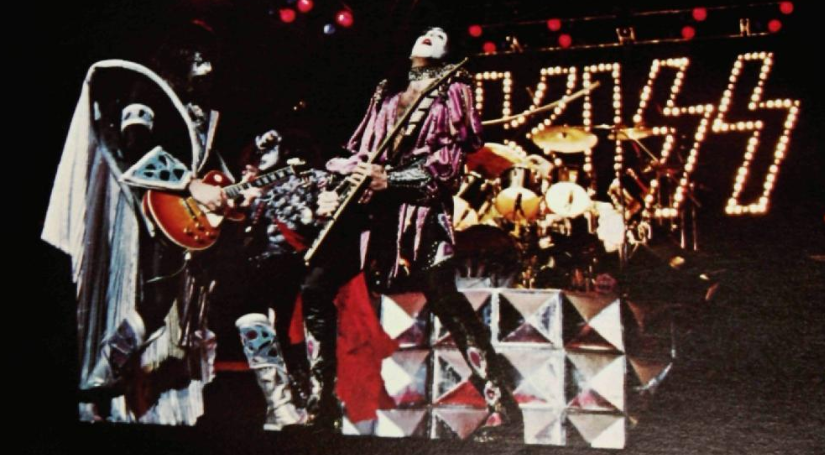

The Dynasty Tour, also known as "The Return of Kiss", was the first tour to feature the famous flying stunt by Gene Simmons. This was also the first tour to feature Ace Frehley's "lighted guitar" and his rocket-shooting guitar, where after his smoke-spewing guitar solo, the still-smoking guitar would float up. As it was floating upward, he would appear with another guitar, aim the neck at the floating guitar, shoot the rockets, and blow it up. John Elder Robison, who served as a technician for the band during the late 1970s, documented the lengths he went to create the elaborate effects for the tour. A trick was designed for Paul Stanley that involved his putting on a headset and shooting a laser out of his left eye to mock the effect seen in Kiss Meets the Phantom of the Park the year before. After several runthroughs, both Stanley and manager Bill Aucoin canceled the idea, citing the danger involved.

The tour, dubbed "The Return Of Kiss", also saw a decline in audience. Additional dates at the Pontiac Silverdome were cancelled. Reviews and recordings have confirmed the tour was also of poor musical quality. This was the last tour with Peter Criss on drums until 1996. He would later admit he would intentionally stop playing during shows just to upset the rest of the band.

This is the only tour to feature songs from all four members' solo albums. Simmons performed "Radioactive", Criss performed "Tossin' and Turnin'", Frehley performed "New York Groove", and Stanley performed "Move On". Simmons' and Criss's songs were replaced with more familiar songs early in the tour. Criss's song "Dirty Livin" was reportedly rehearsed, but never performed.

Frehley stated in various interviews that Kiss was becoming a youth-oriented band. It was because kids were showing up dressed in costume and make-up for their shows along with their parents.

In the tour program for the band's final tour, Stanley reflected on the tour:

I designed the stage while I was in the studio in 1978 producing a band called New England. Kiss was selling a lot of behind-the-stage seats, and I wanted everyone in the audience to feel that they weren't forgotten, so I came up with a multi-level hexagon where we were free to roam and sing from many vantage points. Most of our stages have been dark overall and I thought we would stand out a lot more on a white stage. Because we had reached iconic proportions as a band and I knew the anticipation for us at the shows would be huge I thought rising from inside the stage and holding a frozen pose would make us that larger than life by our presence alone setting off the crowd. In hindsight I think had we stayed in classic black and silver outfits it would have contrasted the stage and been much more powerful. The multi colored outfits made it all look a bit too Vegas for me and it took away the edge. The stage was really unique in that it almost looked like a massive monument rather that your typical one level flat rectangular stage. I loved it.

== Reception ==
Roman Kozak from Billboard opened his review, stating that there was nothing quite like a Kiss concert. He noted on the addition of audiences who were in their preteens and teens, adding that they were quite pleased by the extravagant performance. Kozak pointed out that while the band had done little to its basic formula, they played a "thunderous heavy metal music" and said they were as good as they needed to be, in which there was hardly a dull moment with the usage of special effects, as well as the new addition of Gene Simmons levitating 30 feet (10 m) to the top of the lighting truss, which had impressed the audience.

== Tour dates ==
Date	City	Country	Venue	Opening Act(s)
June 15, 1979	Lakeland	United States	Lakeland Civic Center	Nantucket
June 17, 1979	Pembroke Pines	United States	Hollywood Sportatorium	Nantucket
June 19, 1979	Savannah	United States	Savannah Civic Center	The Sweet
June 22, 1979	Columbia	United States	Carolina Coliseum	Whiteface
June 24, 1979	Charlotte	United States	Charlotte Coliseum	Nantucket
June 26, 1979	Greenville	United States	Greenville Memorial Auditorium	Nantucket
June 28, 1979	Asheville	United States	Asheville Civic Center	Nantucket
June 30, 1979	Atlanta	United States	The Omni Coliseum	New England
July 3, 1979	Greensboro	United States	Greensboro Coliseum	Nantucket
July 5, 1979	Hampton	United States	Hampton Coliseum	New England
July 7, 1979	Landover	United States	Capital Centre	New England
July 8, 1979	Landover	United States	Capital Centre	New England
July 10, 1979	Roanoke	United States	Roanoke Civic Center	New England
July 13, 1979	Pontiac	United States	Pontiac Silverdome	Cheap Trick; New England
July 16, 1979	Lexington	United States	Rupp Arena	New England
July 18, 1979	Richfield	United States	Richfield Coliseum	New England
July 19, 1979	Richfield	United States	Richfield Coliseum	New England
July 21, 1979	Pittsburgh	United States	Pittsburgh Civic Arena	New England
July 24, 1979	New York City	United States	Madison Square Garden	New England
July 25, 1979	New York City	United States	Madison Square Garden	New England
July 28, 1979	Portland	United States	Cumberland County Civic Center	New England
July 31, 1979	Providence	United States	Providence Civic Center	New England
August 1, 1979	Providence	United States	Providence Civic Center	New England
August 4, 1979	Toronto	Canada	Maple Leaf Gardens	New England
August 6, 1979	Montreal	Canada	Montreal Forum	New England
August 8, 1979	Buffalo	United States	Buffalo Memorial Auditorium	New England
August 10, 1979	Indianapolis	United States	Market Square Arena	The Michael Stanley Band
August 12, 1979	Memphis	United States	Mid-South Coliseum	New England
August 14, 1979	Nashville	United States	Nashville Municipal Auditorium	New England
August 16, 1979	Birmingham	United States	BJCC Coliseum	New England
August 18, 1979	Baton Rouge	United States	Riverside Centroplex Arena	New England
August 20, 1979	Mobile	United States	Mobile Municipal Auditorium	Eli
September 1, 1979	Uniondale	United States	Nassau Veterans Memorial Coliseum	Judas Priest
September 3, 1979	New Haven	United States	New Haven Coliseum	Judas Priest
September 5, 1979	Springfield	United States	Springfield Civic Center	Judas Priest
September 7, 1979	Philadelphia	United States	The Spectrum	Judas Priest
September 10, 1979	Huntington	United States	Huntington Civic Center	Judas Priest
September 12, 1979	Knoxville	United States	Knoxville Civic Coliseum	Judas Priest
September 14, 1979	Cincinnati	United States	Riverfront Coliseum	Judas Priest
September 16, 1979	Louisville	United States	Freedom Hall	Judas Priest
September 18, 1979	Fort Wayne	United States	Allen County War Memorial Coliseum	Judas Priest
September 20, 1979	Evansville	United States	Roberts Municipal Stadium	Judas Priest
September 22, 1979	Chicago	United States	International Amphitheater	Judas Priest
September 24, 1979	Milwaukee	United States	MECCA Arena	Judas Priest
September 26, 1979	Madison	United States	Dane County Coliseum	Judas Priest
September 28, 1979	Bloomington	United States	Metropolitan Sports Center	Judas Priest
September 30, 1979	Kansas City	United States	Kansas City Municipal Auditorium	Judas Priest
October 2, 1979	St. Louis	United States	The Checkerdome	John Cougar and the Zone
October 4, 1979	Des Moines	United States	Iowa Veterans Memorial Auditorium	John Cougar and the Zone
October 6, 1979	Duluth	United States	Duluth Arena-Auditorium	John Cougar and the Zone
October 8, 1979	Omaha	United States	Omaha Civic Auditorium	John Cougar and the Zone
October 10, 1979	Cedar Rapids	United States	Five Seasons Center	John Cougar and the Zone
October 12, 1979	Valley Center	United States	Britt Brown Arena	John Cougar and the Zone
October 14, 1979	Pine Bluff	United States	Pine Bluff Convention Center	John Cougar and the Zone
October 17, 1979	Norman	United States	Lloyd Noble Center	Breathless
October 19, 1979	San Antonio	United States	HemisFair Arena	John Cougar and the Zone
October 21, 1979	Houston	United States	The Summit	Breathless
October 23, 1979	Fort Worth	United States	Tarrant County Convention Center	Breathless
October 27, 1979	Abilene	United States	Taylor County Coliseum	Breathless
October 29, 1979	Tulsa	United States	Tulsa Assembly Center	Breathless
October 31, 1979	Lubbock	United States	Lubbock Municipal Coliseum	Breathless
November 4, 1979	Denver	United States	McNichols Sports Arena	Breathless
November 6, 1979	Anaheim	United States	Anaheim Convention Center	Breathless
November 7, 1979	Inglewood	United States	The Forum	Breathless
November 10, 1979	Phoenix	United States	Arizona Veterans Memorial Coliseum	Breathless
November 19, 1979	Vancouver	Canada	Pacific Coliseum	Loverboy
November 21, 1979	Seattle	United States	Seattle Center Coliseum	The Rockets
November 25, 1979	Daly City	United States	Cow Palace	The Rockets
November 27, 1979	Fresno	United States	Selland Arena	The Rockets
November 29, 1979	San Diego	United States	San Diego Sports Arena	The Rockets
December 1, 1979	Albuquerque	United States	Tingley Coliseum	The Rockets
December 3, 1979	Amarillo	United States	Amarillo Civic Center	The Rockets
December 6, 1979	Lake Charles	United States	Sudduth Coliseum	The Rockets
December 8, 1979	Shreveport	United States	Hirsch Memorial Coliseum	The Rockets
December 10, 1979	Jackson	United States	Mississippi Coliseum	The Rockets
December 12, 1979	Biloxi	United States	Mississippi Coast Coliseum	The Rockets
December 14, 1979	Huntsville	United States	Von Braun Civic Center	The Rockets
December 16, 1979	Toledo	United States	Toledo Sports Arena	The Rockets

=== Cancelled / postponed dates ===
Date	City	Country	Venue	Reasoning
June 14, 1979	Lakeland	United States	Lakeland Civic Center	Hand injury to Peter Criss and or low ticket sales
June 20, 1979	Savannah	United States	Savannah Civic Center	Low ticket sales
July 1, 1979	Atlanta	United States	The Omni Coliseum	Low ticket sales
July 14, 1979	Pontiac	United States	Pontiac Silverdome	Temp hold date; tickets never put on sale
July 22, 1979	Pittsburgh	United States	Pittsburgh Civic Arena	Low ticket sales
July 27, 1979	New York City	United States	Madison Square Garden	Tour rerouting and or low ticket sales
July 28, 1979	New York City	United States	Madison Square Garden	Tour rerouting and or low ticket sales
July 29, 1979	New York City	United States	Madison Square Garden	Tour rerouting and or low ticket sales
August 2, 1979	Providence	United States	Providence Civic Center	Temp hold date, tickets never put on sale
September 8, 1979	Philadelphia	United States	The Spectrum	Low ticket sales
September 28, 1979	Bloomington	United States	Metropolitan Sports Center	Temp hold date
October 25, 1979	Beaumont	United States	Beaumont Civic Center	Low ticket sales
November 2, 1979	Midland	United States	Al G. Langford Chaparral Center	Illness to Paul Stanley
November 23, 1979	Portland	United States	Portland Memorial Coliseum	Oregon fire Marshalls refused to issue a permit for use of pyrotechnics

== Box office ==
Date (1979)	City	Venue	Attendance	Gross	Ref(s)
July 16	Lexington	Rupp Arena	9,480	$92,500	
July 21	Pittsburgh	Civic Arena	13,873	$142,352	
August 14	Nashville	Municipal Auditorium	9,900	$113,148	
August 16	Birmingham	Jefferson Coliseum	12,213	$112,341	
November 19	Vancouver, Canada	Pacific Coliseum	14,271	$145,399	
November 21	Seattle	Seattle Center Coliseum	14,000	$133,000	

== Personnel ==
- Paul Stanley – vocals, rhythm guitar
- Gene Simmons – vocals, bass
- Peter Criss – drums, vocals
- Ace Frehley – lead guitar, vocals
