= Sure Know Something =

Single by Kiss

from the album Dynasty
- B-side: "Dirty Livin'"
- Released: August 1979
- Recorded: 1979
- Studio: Electric Lady Studios, New York City; Record Plant Studios, New York City
- Genre: Hard rock; pop rock; disco
- Length: 3:58
- Label: Casablanca NB-2205 (US)
- Songwriters: Paul Stanley, Vini Poncia
- Producer: Vini Poncia

Kiss singles chronology
"I Was Made for Lovin' You" (1979)	"Sure Know Something" (1979)	"Dirty Livin'" (1980)

"Sure Know Something" is a song by American rock, band Kiss, released in 1979 as the second single off their seventh studio album Dynasty. While not as successful as the album's previous single, "I Was Made for Lovin' You", the song reached No. 47 on the U.S. Billboard Hot 100 chart, and was another top ten hit (No. 4) for the band in Australia.

== Composition ==
"Sure Know Something" is a hard rock and pop rock ballad written by vocalist and rhythm guitarist Paul Stanley and producer Vini Poncia. Along with "Strutter '78", "I Was Made for Lovin' You" and "Dirty Livin'", the song is one of four disco flirtations by Kiss. One of the more sophisticated songs written by Stanley, it's heavily carried by a bass guitar line that follows a close melody to the vocals. Musically and lyrically darker than most Kiss tracks, it's played in a minor key with lyrics referring to being overwhelmed by loss of virginity.

== Reception ==
Cash Box declared the song has "a rock-anthemic quality with just the right pop hook to take it straight to the top." Record World called it a "megarocker that bowls you over with sheer power and enthusiasm." A personal favorite of Castleton Spartan writer Jack Aicher, he claims the "retro sounds from the vinyl pull the listener deeper into this song."

A promotional video, directed by John Goodhue, features the band on a mock-up of what was their Dynasty-era stage show.

== Appearances ==
"Sure Know Something" has appeared on the following Kiss albums:

- Dynasty - studio version
- Killers - studio version
- Kiss Unplugged - live version
- Greatest Kiss - studio version
- The Box Set - studio version
- Kiss Symphony: Alive IV - live version
- Gold - studio version

Other appearances:

- B-side of the "Dirty Livin'" single
- B-side of the "2,000 Man" single
- Double A-Side of the "Tomorrow" single in Mexico

== Track listing ==
No.	Title	Writer(s)	Length
1.	"Sure Know Something"	Paul Stanley, Vini Poncia	3:38
2.	"Dirty Livin'"	Peter Criss, Stan Penridge	3:45
Total length:			7:23

== Personnel ==
- Paul Stanley – lead vocals, rhythm and lead guitar
- Gene Simmons – bass, backing vocals
- Ace Frehley – additional guitar, backing vocals
- Anton Fig – drums
- Vini Poncia – keyboards, backing vocals

== Charts ==
=== Weekly charts ===
Chart (1979–1980)	Peak position
Australian Singles (Kent Music Report)	4
Canada Top Singles (RPM)	48
Netherlands (Dutch Top 40)	3
New Zealand (Recorded Music NZ)	11
US Billboard Hot 100	47
West Germany (GfK)	28

=== Year-end charts ===
Year-end chart performance for "Sure Know Something"
Chart (1979)	Position
Australian Singles (Kent Music Report)	45

Chart (1980)	Position
Australian Singles (Kent Music Report)	76
