= Peter Criss (2025 album) =

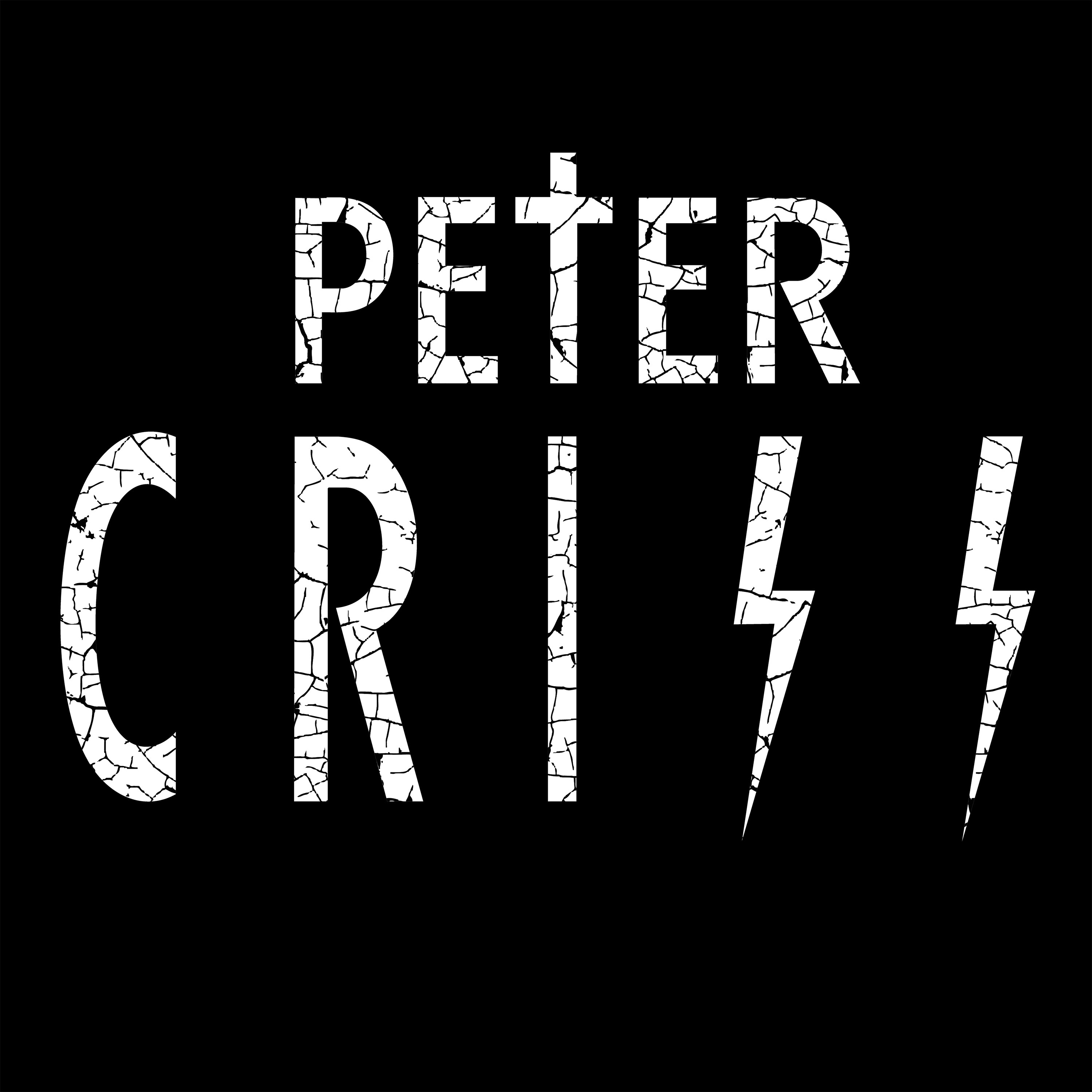

Studio album by Peter Criss
- Released: December 19, 2025
- Genre: Rock
- Length: 42:51
- Label: Silvercat Records
- Producer: Barry Pointer

Peter Criss chronology
One for All (2007)	Peter Criss (2025)

Singles from Peter Criss
- 1. "Creepy Crawlers" Released: October 31, 2025

Peter Criss is the sixth solo studio album by former Kiss drummer Peter Criss. The album is his first studio album since 2007's One for All and his second self-titled album following his debut solo album in 1978. Criss announced the album in April 2025, revealing an all-star lineup including John 5, Piggy D, Mike McLaughlin, Billy Sheehan, and Paul Shaffer. On October 31, 2025, Criss announced a release date of December 19, 2025, which was one day before his 80th birthday.

== Reception ==
In a positive review, Sakis Nikas of Rock Pages called the album "a very good rock album" and concluded the review by saying, "I think, or rather I am sure, that most people out there did not expect Peter Criss to release such a high-quality album. The fact that it comes after 18 years of recording inactivity gives it extra points. And if it turns out that this is the last full length album by a member of Kiss, then Peter’s eponymous work takes on an additional symbolic significance."

Rock The Joint magazine said of the album that it is "solid, often enjoyable late-career record that comfortably outperforms One For All and shows Peter still has swing, soul, and something to say," but criticized the album's "baffling" release strategy.

Writing for Sleaze Roxx, John Stoney Cannon called it a "pretty solid album from start to finish" and singled out "Creepy Crawlers", "Rock, Rockin', Rock & Roll", "Murder", "Hard Rock Knockers", "In The Dark", and "Justice" as standout tracks.

== Track listing ==
Track list from Apple Music:

All lyrics are written by Peter Criss; all music is composed by Peter Criss and Mike McLaughlin.

No.	Title	Length
1.	"Rock, Rockin', Rock & Roll"	4:16
2.	"In the Dark"	4:10
3.	"For the Money"	4:06
4.	"Murder"	3:17
5.	"Walking on Water"	4:56
6.	"Creepy Crawlers"	3:42
7.	"Justice"	3:18
8.	"Cheaper to Keep Her"	4:00
9.	"Sugar"	4:45
10.	"Rubberneckin'"	2:58
11.	"Hard Rock Knockers"	3:23

== Personnel ==
=== Musicians ===
- Peter Criss – Lead and backing vocals, drums, percussion
- Mike McLaughlin – rhythm and lead guitar
- Billy Sheehan – bass
- Paul Shaffer – keyboards
- John 5 – rhythm and lead guitar (tracks 6, 7, 10)
- Piggy D – bass (track 8)
- Dennis Collins – backing vocals
- Sharon Collins – backing vocals
- Cat Manning – backing vocals

=== Production ===
- Barry Pointer – producer, engineering, mixing
- Ryan Smith – mastering
- Matt Montgomery – graphic design

== Charts ==
Chart (2025)	Peak position
iTunes Rock Charts	1
