= Awaken (band) =

Belgian musical group

AWAKEN
- Also known as: 泡件, Trường Hợp Bong Bóng
- Origin: Belgium; also Japan, Vietnam, France, Australia, England
- Genres: Disco, rock, funk, hard rock, Hi-NRG, soul, reggae, J-pop, art rock
- Years active: 1988–present
- Label: It's Oh! Music
- Members: various (see "Musicians" section of this page).
- Past members: various (see "Musicians" section of this page).
- Website: gilles-snowcat.com

Awaken is an underground rock band / indie music project based in Belgium. They have released two official albums, numerous demo tapes and web-only singles since their early days in 1988.

Not related to the modern Belgian scene at all (such as dEUS, Eté 67, Girls in Hawaii), Awaken gained interest from Vietnamese people, after the release of Vietnamese song, "Chú Mèo Ngủ Quên", and in Japan with the virtual EP "別府NIGHTS". Recently, a cover of Vietnamese children song "Rửa Mặt Như Mèo" has been recorded and heard on the Vietnamese internet, though not officially released. Since 2005, Awaken is part of the team on the indie Japanese label It's Oh! Music, based in Miyazaki city.

== Name ==
The name AWAKEN means "a matter of bubbles", according to the Japanese translation:

- 泡件 (awaken) or アワケン in Japanese
- 泡件 (pàojiàn) in Chinese
- "Trường Hợp Bong Bóng" in Vietnamese

== Genre ==
AWAKEN's style mixes disco beats and progressive structures, karaoke arrangements and heavy sounds, Belgian new beat rhythms and romantic new wave. The instrumentation is often focussed on keyboards and electronic sounds though electric guitar and bass guitar are more audible in recent songs. AWAKEN's latest songs have been influenced by various places in Japan, Vietnam and the rest of the world : "The Train Is Leaving Kokura" mentions Kokura (小倉) and Usa (宇佐), "Beppu Nights" happens in Beppu (別府), known for its hot springs, "Wasabi Kiss" describes the peninsula of Shuzenji, "Yanagigaura" (柳ヶ浦) evoques the feeling of loneliness in the small city of Yanagigaura and "As A Start : Cà Phê And Pizza" is an imaginary trip from Italy, Vietnam and Japan. The 2009 single "My Last Evening In 大分" / "Chase Around 大分駅" is based on Gilles Snowcat's own memories of the city of Ôita, Japan.

== Musicians ==
Being a project more than a band, different musicians appear following the recordings of the band, some as members and some as guests.

=== Present musicians (members and guests) ===
- Irène Csordas: lead voice
- Hakim Rahmouni: guitars
- Nicolas Leroy: bass
- Sébastien Bournier: voice and drums
- Trustno1: keyboards
- Jean-Paul Hupé: synthesizer programming
- PatLap: lead voice and Electro-acoustic guitar
- Paul G: electric guitar and lead voice
- Trịnh Thanh Duyên: lead voice
- 日向逸夫先生 (Mr. Hyuga): programming
- トゥイちゃん (Tui-Chan): harmony voice and FX
- Gilles Snowcat (雪猫ジル): lead voice, synthesizers, keyboards, programming, electric guitar, bass guitar, percussion, add.flute

=== Past musicians (members and guests) ===
- Fabien Remblier : lead voice and bass guitar
- Ced Mattys : bass guitar
- Zoé de York, Cedric Hamelrijck, Mike Wolf and Yves Larivierre : guitar
- Karo VR : guitar and voice
- 小西順子さん, Ptit Bout, Julie Absil, Lionel Meessen, Amy Kay, Jenny Quinn, Gautier Elocman, Joëlle Yana, Ambre and Bridge : lead voice
- Gina Mainardi, 猪瀬悠理さん, みゆさん, 五味田敬子さん, 福地麗さん, 森紀和子さん, Sophie de York, Evelyne, Anna-Maria and Orely : harmony voice
- Floris VDV, Laetitia VDV and Carla : spoken voice
- Socre : rap voice
- Greg Revel : programming
- Hervé Gilles : keyboards
- Aurélia Thirion : keyboards and harmony voice
- Vincent Trouble : accordion
- Philippe Tasquin : violin
- Elke P : drums
- Pol X : guitar, drums and drum machine

== Collaboration ==
- Though independent, AWAKEN is collaborating with Japanese label It's Oh! Music and appears on J-pop singer Koiko's CD Vitamin!.
- In 1999, AWAKEN was invited twice on stage to perform the song "Last Days Of The Century" with its creator Al Stewart.
- French TV actor Fabien Remblier recorded several songs with AWAKEN in 2000 and was supposed to be part of the 20th anniversary single in 2008.

== Repertoire (original songs and covers) ==
AWAKEN mixes original songs and covers, a similar attitude to Manfred Mann and Vanilla Fudge earlier. Artists that have been covered by AWAKEN include:

- Dick Annegarn
- Tony Banks
- Bee Gees
- David Bowie
- Georges Brassens
- Captain Beyond
- Cerrone
- Alain Chamfort
- Cold Chisel
- Peter Criss
- Deep Purple
- Depeche Mode
- Earth Wind & Fire
- Fish
- Matthew Fisher
- Genesis
- Ian Gillan / Roger Glover
- Philip Glass
- Michael Jackson
- Jackson 5
- Jacksons
- Quincy Jones
- Patrick Juvet
- Kiss
- Jon Lord
- Paul McCartney
- Manfred Mann's Earth Band
- Metallica
- Rufus
- Frank Sinatra
- Sparks
- Al Stewart
- Donna Summer
- Supremes
- Tangerine Dream
- Toto
- Uriah Heep
- Vanilla Fudge
- Neil Young

== Nekokawa (猫川 - Dòng Sông Mèo) ==
AWAKEN has a side-project named NEKOKAWA since 2002, focussing on the ambient side of its music. NEKOKAWA is 猫川 in Japanese and Dòng Sông Mèo in Vietnamese.

== Discography ==
=== LPs ===
- Tales Of Acid Ice Cream (1 January 1996)
- Party In Lyceum's Toilets (14 February 2001)
- Moko-Moko Collection (『モコモコ・コレクション』) (22 February 2012, Gilles Snowcat solo release)
- Nama Time! (『生タイム!』) (9 December 2015, Gilles Snowcat solo release, live album)

=== EPs ===
- Beppu Nights (『別府NIGHTS』) (2006)
- This Mouth... (nhạc cho Em Mèo) (2008, Gilles Snowcat solo release)
- How Many L Were In Your Name? / My Last Evening In 大分 (Awaken version) / How Many L Were In Your Name? (hi-NRG mix) (2010)
- Yanagigaura (『柳ヶ浦』) (2010, Gilles Snowcat solo release)

=== Singles (non-exhaustive listing) ===
- "One Wild War" (2002)
- "山葵KISS" (read: Wasabi Kiss) (2003)
- "五本木の星" (read: Gohongi No Hoshi) (2003)
- "DRUNKEN熊" (read: Drunken Kuma) (2004)
- "When Alena Entered The Quiet Room" (2004)
- "Chú Mèo Ngủ Quên" (2005)
- "As A Start : Cà Phê & Pizza" (2006)
- "Áo Dài Màu Hồng" / "Xúp Sô-Cô-La" (2007)
- "I Know Time Is Passing By..." / "別府NIGHTS" -disco take- (2008)
- "Riding The Yellow Line Gives Vibrations" (2008, Gilles Snowcat solo release)
- "The Blue Hanger" (pink disco yellow mix) / "Don't Worry Em Mèo (on the pops)" / "Riding The Yellow Line Gives Vibrations" (still shaking mix) (2009, Gilles Snowcat solo release)
- "My Last Evening In 大分" / "Chase Around 大分駅" (2009, Gilles Snowcat solo release)
- "Mardi Gras Station" (2017, Gilles Snowcat solo release)
- "バレた！" / "エレガントに" / "Three Kinds Of Milk (live)" (2017, Gilles Snowcat solo release)

=== Tapes ===
- Numb (March 1993)
- Phase 2 : Scrappy (September 1993)
- Zéro Sur Dix, Encore Raté ! (Gilles Snowcat solo, August 1994)
- Awaken 3 : Blurp ! (January 1995)

=== Vintage and rare songs (non-exhaustive listing) ===
- "Polygonal Mirror" (February 1988)
- "Sandrine" (rough piano version) (July 1988)
- "Interlude 6" (June 1988)
- "Memories Of A Teenage Cat" (original studio version) (March 1989)
- "Misty Conclusion" (live in studio, Beppu, Japan) (May 2007)

=== Contribution to tribute albums ===
- You Should Have Listened To AsmL, tribute albums to Al Stewart, 1997 and 2001.
- Lost In The Looking Glass, tribute album to Procol Harum, 2002

== Party In Lyceum's Toilets ==
Party In Lyceum's Toilets

Studio album by Awaken
- Released: 2001
- Recorded: 1999–2001, some bits in 1988
- Genre: Pop, disco, hard rock, progressive rock, hi-NRG
- Length: 140 minutes
- Producer: Gilles Snowcat, Lionel Meessen, John Sellekaers

Awaken chronology
Tales Of Acid Ice Cream (1996)	Party In Lyceum's Toilets (2001)	Beppu Nights (別府NIGHTS) (2006)

Party In Lyceum's Toilets is the second album by the music project Awaken, released in 2001. This double CD features original songs (volume 1) and covers (volume 2).

=== History ===
While its predecessor, Tales Of Acid Ice Cream, was completed in one studio only, Party In Lyceum's Toilets was recorded in a portable studio that was brought along to meet several musicians in Belgium and France. The first takes come from 1999, as the album was recorded rather slowly.

=== Controversy ===
Despite his efforts to introduce the new Awaken as a band, leader Gilles Snowcat fails, as the booklet details show that the quartet hardly plays together on more than six of the 41 tracks. The main band is then dubbed by 12 additional musicians. In some songs Snowcat plays alone or only with guest musicians, which caused anger from the main singer and the lead guitarist. Apart from the keyboardist, none of the musicians had played on the previous album Tales Of Acid Ice Cream.

=== Other information ===
- The album was due to be released in September 2000, then as more songs were added it was postponed to January 2001 but then technical problems made its actual release happen on Valentine's Day.
- Being influenced by the 33 rpm era, Awaken divided the two CDs into virtual sides. As a tribute to Earth Wind & Fire, each "side" of the volume 1 starts with a short piece as interlude, except the side 4 (for timing reasons).
- The sides 1 and 2 were dedicated to regular songs, side 3 to more experimental pieces and side 4 to early Awaken songs from 1988 but recorded properly in 2000.
- The song "Bonnie Parker Rêve" was written by a French composer whose family name was the same as Snowcat's first name, which induced some confusion from listeners. It is the only original Awaken song on this album that does not feature Gilles Snowcat in the writing credit.
- The song "Four Dreams Suite" starts with the noise of a Porsche 911's engine and ends with musical bits recorded in 1988. The song itself is a new take from 2000, since no studio version had been recorded before.
- The CD2 is only made of covers, some of them being interludes and into a conceptual shape named "Dark Dream Opera".

=== Track listing CD 1 (original songs) ===
- side 1
1. Interlude: "Misty Conclusion"
2. "I'll Disagree"
3. "Cold As My Heart"
4. "Carla's Dream"
5. "Neons Of Lyceum's Toilets"
- side 2
1. Interlude: "'The True Story Of Maïté D.H."
2. "Down The Drain"
3. "Dead In A Subway"
4. "Cutting My Loved One"
5. "Spleen Fourteen"
- side 3
1. Interlude: "Ellen's Orange Room"
2. "Lycée Nase" (featuring 1030)
3. "Bonnie Parker Rêve" (featuring Hervé Gilles)
4. "Britney and Barry"
- side 4
1. "Electric Time"
2. "Four Dreams Suite": i. Günz (a) Overture; b) Over The 'A'; c) Nine Elements Of Life) ii. Polygonal Mirror iii. Rising Forest iv. The Test v. Sweet Wave Of Ice Cream vi. Out Of The Flowerwall vii. Tygersmile viii. Interlude 6 ix. Sandrine x. 8888 xi. Subliminal Mountain xii. The World Where Bears Never Lock The Door xiii. Cucumber Phone xiv. Picture From An April's Dream xv. Lady S xvi. The Last Escape Of Lady S xvii. Dark Spring xviii. Four Dreams Epilogue

=== Track listing CD 2 (covers) ===
- side 1
1. "One Caress" (cover from Depeche Mode)
2. "Eesom" (cover from Quincy Jones)
3. "Send My Body Home" (cover from Dick Annegarn)
4. "One Thing" (cover from Neil Young) / "Best Kept Lies" (cover from Cold Chisel)
- side 2
1. "L.A. Is My Lady" (cover from Frank Sinatra)
2. "Run Out Of Time" (cover from Genesis)
3. "You're Really Out Of Line" (cover from Rufus) / "Golden Age Dreams" (cover from Vanilla Fudge) / "I'm Gonna Love You" (cover from Peter Criss) / "Heart of Me" (cover from Cerrone)
- side 3
1. "Nothing Else Matters" (cover from Metallica)
2. "Chrysalide" (cover from Patrick Juvet) / "Open The Kingdom" (cover from Philip Glass) / "The Dance" (cover from Uriah Heep)
3. "Sweet Thing" (cover from David Bowie)
- side 4 : "A dark dream opera in 12 acts"
1. "Koyaanisqatsi" (cover from Philip Glass) / "Shandi" (cover from Kiss) / "This Is Love" (cover from Tony Banks)
2. Interlude: "Clouds And Rain" (cover from Gillan & Glover)
3. "In Search Of England" (cover from Barclay James Harvest)
4. "Tyger" (cover from Tangerine Dream) / "Everybody" (cover from Jacksons)
5. "Sweet Dream Machine" / "Come Into My Life" / "Love I Never Knew You Could Feel So Good" (covers from Supremes)
6. "Something I Should Have Known" (cover from Matthew Fisher)
7. "Taking It Back" (cover from Toto)
8. Interlude: "Jazzy" (cover from Renaud Lhoest)
9. "Young Girls" (cover from Sparks)
10. Interlude: "(Theme) Once Upon A Time" (cover from Donna Summer)
11. "Only The Fool Survives" (cover from Donna Summer)
12. "Hearts To Heart" / "Moonwalk" (covers from Earth Wind & Fire)
13. "Here Today" (cover from Paul McCartney)
14. "The Candidate" (cover from Al Stewart)
15. "Until..." (cover from Bee Gees)

=== Musicians ===
- Lionel Meessen : voice
- Cedric Hamelrijck : guitar, additional drum programming
- Julie 'Cunégonde' Absil : voice
- Gilles Snowcat : keyboards, machines, bass guitar, voice, additional acoustic guitar, drum programming, tapes

=== Guest musicians ===
- Carla : dream voice
- Fabien Remblier : voice, bass guitar
- Paul G : guitar, voice
- Socre : rap voice
- Patrick Laplagne : guitar
- Mike Wolf : guitar
- Orely : voice
- Anna-Maria : voice
- Evelyne : voice
- Hervé Gilles : keyboards and programming
- Laetitia Van der Vennet : spoken voice
- Floris Van der Vennet : spoken voice

=== Design ===
Gilles Snowcat, Awaken, Patrick Laplagne, 1030 (Socre), Peter Clasen.

=== Availability ===
Online. Catalog number : awalp-002

=== Outtakes ===
Three songs had been completely recorded but finally dumped :

- "Dream Shapes On A Night Movie" : a progressive dance track.
- "Interlude : Still Today / I'm 9" : an interlude that was supposed to open the side 4 of CD1, but rejected for timing reasons.
- "Electric Time" : an alternate version, played and sung by Snowcat only, that was rejected to make place for a totally different take played by the whole group.

Other songs have been worked but never fully recorded : a cover version of Marillion's "The Party" and Yes' "Big Generator" being on the list. Other Awaken songs were planned to appear but not chosen on the final list and not even recorded at all. Most of the tapes have been deleted, which means a future remix without the songs fading out has become impossible to do.
