= Hold Me, Touch Me (Think of Me When We're Apart) =

1978 single by Paul Stanley

Single by Paul Stanley

from the album Paul Stanley
- Released: September 1978 (US)
- Recorded: Electric Lady Studios (New York City, New York); The Record Plant Studios, The Village Recorder (Los Angeles, California)
- Length: 3:40
- Label: Casablanca
- Songwriter: Paul Stanley
- Producer: Paul Stanley

Paul Stanley singles chronology
"Strutter '78 (Edit)" / "Shock Me" (1978)	"Hold Me, Touch Me (Think of Me When We're Apart)" / "Goodbye" (1978)	"Radioactive" / "See You in Your Dreams" (1978)

"Hold Me, Touch Me (Think of Me When We're Apart)" is a song written by Paul Stanley, the rhythm guitarist and lead vocalist of the American hard rock band Kiss. It is the only single released from his eponymous solo debut album. Paul Stanley was one of four solo albums released simultaneously by the band members of Kiss on September 18, 1978.

== Background ==
"Hold Me, Touch Me (Think of Me When We're Apart)" reached the top 50 on the U.S. Billboard Hot 100 chart, peaking at number 46 on November 4, 1978. The song charted for 12 weeks and was the second most successful single from the four solo albums, after the Ace Frehley cover of Russ Ballard's "New York Groove" reached number 13 and charted for 21 weeks on the Hot 100. Gene Simmons' "Radioactive" was the third most successful single from the Kiss solo albums, reaching number 47 on the Billboard Hot 100 with an 8-week run on the charts, while the two Peter Criss singles, "You Matter to Me" and "Don't You Let Me Down", failed to chart.

== Personnel ==
- Paul Stanley - lead vocals, all guitars
- Doug Katsaros – piano, omni string ensemble and backing vocals
- Eric Nelson – bass guitar
- Craig Krampf – drums
- Peppy Castro – backing vocals

== Chart ==
Chart (1978)	Peak position
Canada Top Singles (RPM)	64
US Billboard Hot 100	46
