= Victor Stabin =

American painter

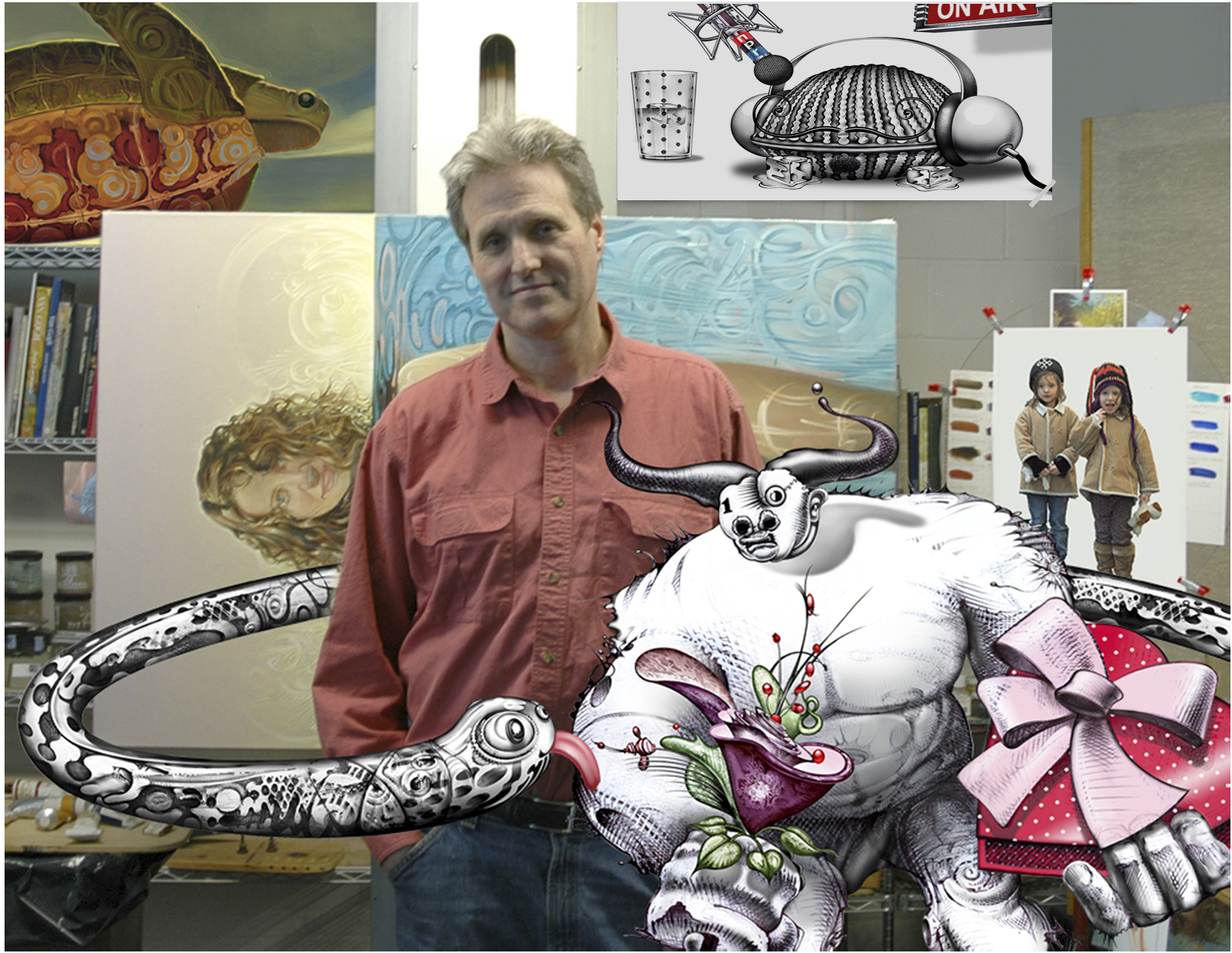
- Victor Stabin
- Born: March 5, 1954 (age 72); Brooklyn, New York, U.S.
- Known for: Artist
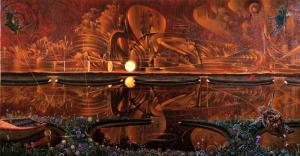
- Notable work: Book: Daedal Doodle; Paintings: Hatchlings; Getting Ready; Keep Your Eye on the Ball
- Movement: Eco-Surrealist
- Website: www.victorstabin.com

Victor Stabin (born March 5, 1954) is an American artist, "eco-surrealist" painter, author and illustrator. He is noted for his work in education and has used his book Daedal Doodle as a teaching tool in several schools, an endeavor sponsored by the National Endowment for the Arts.

== Early life and education ==
Stabin was born in Brooklyn. His, father, Jack Stabin worked on the Manhattan Project. His mother Florence was a piano teacher in Brooklyn.
Stabin began his formal education as an artist at the Art Students League of New York attending summers from age 13 to 17. He also attended the High School of Art and Design from which he graduated in 1972. He then studied at Los Angeles' Art Center College of Design before continuing his education at the School of Visual Arts in New York City.

== Early career ==
Stabin began his career as an illustrator. He worked for numerous different publications including Newsweek, The New York Times, Time Magazine and Rolling Stone as well as designing book covers for publishers Penguin Books, Random House and others. Some of his most well-known work as an illustrator includes painting nine stamps for the United States Postal Service, the cover for KISS' album Unmasked, and a mural for RCA/BMG's headquarters.

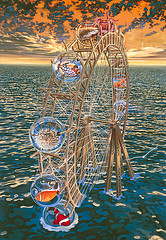
Fish Ferris Wheel (part of The Turtle Series)

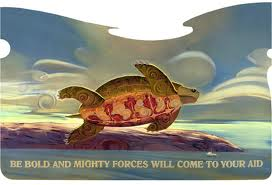
Tom Over Manana (part of The Turtle Series)

=== Stamps ===
The United States Postal Service has hired Stabin to design a number of stamps. He created a Henry Mancini stamp in 2003 which led to him being hired again in 2005 this time to create four of the American scientists series stamps: physicist Richard Feynman, thermodynamicist Willard Gibbs, geneticist Barbara McClintock and mathematician John von Neumann. He was again hired by the USPS in 2008 and created the artwork for stamps depicting four more American scientists—theoretical physicist John Bardeen, biochemist Gerty Cori, astronomer Edwin Hubble and chemist Linus Pauling.

== Later projects ==
At age 44 Stabin was diagnosed with cancer and told he had a 50% chance of survival. In the years since his recovery Stabin has moved from illustration to focus on his own work.

=== The Turtle Series ===
Stabin has created a number of paintings entitled The Turtle Series which includes Keep Your Eye on the Ball, Fish Ferris Wheel, and his most recent work, Hatchlings.

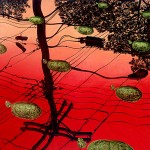
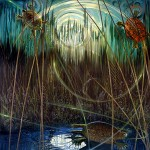
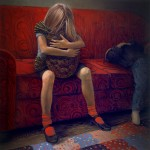
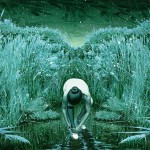
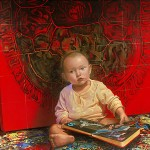

=== Daedal Doodle ===
Stabin has also authored a book called Daedal Doodle which features illustrations and alliterations created by the artist. This work, published in 2011, has been used by Stabin as a teaching tool in a number of schools. Susan Orlean of The New Yorker described it as "original and sly", while Leonard Lopate of WNYC Radio called it, "a visual stunner with delightful definitions". NPR commentator and University of Pennsylvania professor Jeremy Siegel said that looking at the book reminded him of the first time he saw the work of M.C. Escher." A monthly version of ''Daedal Doodle is published in ICON under the title "Alliteration of the Month".

=== Stabin Morykin Building ===
Stabin and his wife, Joan Morykin, renovated a 15,000-square-foot, 170-year-old, former factory building in Jim Thorpe, Pennsylvania. Now called the Stabin Morykin Building, it includes the Victor Stabin Gallery, an art workshop space, and Cafe Arielle restaurant. The galleries currently house the work of Stabin as well as that of his students.
