= Shandi (song) =

Single by Kiss

from the album Unmasked
- B-side: "She's So European"
- Released: May 1980 (US)
- Recorded: The Record Plant, New York City: 1980
- Genre: Soft rock
- Length: 3:36
- Label: Casablanca NB-2282 AS (US)
- Songwriters: Paul Stanley, Vini Poncia
- Producer: Vini Poncia

Kiss singles chronology
"Sure Know Something" / "Dirty Livin'" (1979)	"Shandi" / "She's So European" (1980)	"Talk to Me" / "Naked City" (1980)

Music video
- Shandi on YouTube

"Shandi" is a hit single by American hard rock band Kiss. Released on their 1980 album, Unmasked, the song was popular in Australia, where it spent 8 weeks in the top 10 and peaked at number five on the charts. The song would prove to be a hit in other countries as well, making the top ten in three other countries. "Shandi" peaked at number 47 on the U.S. Billboard Hot 100 Chart.

Written by vocalist/guitarist Paul Stanley and producer Vini Poncia, the song was inspired by the Hollies cover of the Bruce Springsteen song "4th of July, Asbury Park (Sandy)".

The song was performed solo by Stanley on guitar when the band toured Australia and New Zealand. A live version with the Melbourne Symphony Orchestra appears on their 2003 album, Kiss Symphony: Alive IV.

An Eric Carr-sung version appears on his second posthumous album, Unfinished Business.

== Reception ==
Cash Box said that with "arching strings and guitar glissandos," Kiss acts as "closet crooners" rather than producing "fiery heavy metal [or] pounding rock disco." Record World said that "A sweltering lyrical guitar gives Paul Stanley's passionate lead vocal an appropriate introduction."

== Music video ==
A promotional video was made for the song, which proved to be the final appearance of Peter Criss with the band before he left to pursue a solo career in 1980. Although all four original band members appear in the video, only Paul Stanley and Ace Frehley were involved in the recording of the track. Session drummer Anton Fig plays drums, Kiss roadie Tom Harper plays bass and professional songwriter Holly Knight plays keyboards, while Stanley sings lead vocals and plays lead guitar, and Frehley plays acoustic guitars. Vini Poncia provided backing vocals to the track.

The video follows a similar storyline to the cartoon on the cover of Unmasked. A woman stalks the band from outside their dressing room, anxious to see them without their makeup. After their concert, they return to their dressing room to change to their street clothes. Upon exiting the room, the woman calls them out; they turn around, revealing that they still have their makeup on.

== Personnel ==
- Paul Stanley – lead vocals, lead guitar
- Ace Frehley – acoustic guitar, backing vocals
- Anton Fig – drums
- Tom Harper – bass
- Holly Knight – keyboards
- Vini Poncia – backing vocals

== Charts ==
=== Weekly charts ===
Chart (1980-1981)	Peak position
Argentinan Singles (CAPIF)	1
Australian Singles (Kent Music Report)	5
Austria (Ö3 Austria Top 40)	10
Belgium (Ultratop 50 Flanders)	24
Canada Top Singles (RPM)	69
Italy (Musica e dischi)	33
Netherlands (Dutch Top 40)	34
Netherlands (Single Top 100)	20
New Zealand (Recorded Music NZ)	6
Norway (VG-lista)	4
US Billboard Hot 100	47
West Germany (GfK)	28

=== Year-end charts ===
Chart (1980)	Peak position
Australian Singles (Kent Music Report)	23
