= Cat 1 (album) =

Cat #1

Studio album by Criss
- Released: August 16, 1994
- Recorded: Track Records and Cherokee Studios, Los Angeles, California
- Genres: Rock, hard rock
- Length: 46:37
- Label: Tony Nicole Tony Records
- Producers: Dito Godwin, Peter Criss, Mark Montague

Criss chronology
| Let Me Rock You (1982) | Cat #1 (1994) | One for All (2007) |

Professional ratings
Review scores
| Source | Rating |
|---|---|
| AllMusic | 3/5 stars |

Cat #1 is the fourth solo studio album released by former Kiss drummer Peter Criss, and first under the band name Criss. Criss re-recorded the Kiss song "Beth" for the album. Unlike the orchestrated original version, the new recording was an acoustic version. The album also features former-Kiss bandmate Ace Frehley playing guitar on three tracks ("Bad Attitude", "Walk The Line" & "Blue Moon Over Brooklyn").

== Background ==
In 1993, Criss released a special limited edition preview EP compact disc entitled Criss for the forthcoming album. Three tracks were eventually released on the 1994 CD while two tracks were only available on the limited edition CD.

== Release and legacy ==
For the cover art, it was Criss' idea to paint half of his face in his original Kiss makeup, while leaving the other half plain. The idea was to link past and present.

A CD single was released in Europe in 1998 which included three tracks from the album, including "Beth". A promotional video was produced for "Show Me", which was aired on MTV. The album did not chart in any territory.

The album was re-released on colored vinyl in 2019 and included the two tracks from the limited edition CD.

== Track listing ==
| No. | Title | Writer(s) | Length |
|---|---|---|---|
| 1. | "Bad Attitude" | Peter Criss, Mark Montague, Ray Carrion | 4:33 |
| 2. | "Walk the Line" | Criss, Montague | 3:47 |
| 3. | "The Truth" | Montague, Criss, Tosetti | 4:53 |
| 4. | "Bad People Burn in Hell" | Criss, Phil Naro | 3:46 |
| 5. | "Show Me" | Montague, Mike Stone, Criss, Philip Bardowell | 4:03 |
| 6. | "Good Times" | Criss, Kirk Miller, Montague | 4:37 |
| 7. | "Strike" | Criss, Montague | 4:45 |
| 8. | "Blue Moon over Brooklyn" | Criss, Naro | 5:22 |
| 9. | "Down With the Sun" | Criss, Montague | 4:37 |
| 10. | "We Want You" | Carrion, Montague | 3:47 |
| 11. | "Beth" | Stan Penridge, Criss, Bob Ezrin | 2:27 |
| Total length: | | | 37:30 |

== Criss EP track listing ==
| No. | Title | Writer(s) | Length |
|---|---|---|---|
| 1. | "The Cat" | Criss, Montague, Miller, Stone | 4:36 |
| 2. | "Show Me" | Montague, Stone, Criss, Bardowell | 4:03 |
| 3. | "Good Times" | Criss, Miller, Montague | 4:37 |
| 4. | "What You're Doin'" | Criss. Montague, Stone, Miller | 3:09 |
| 5. | "Beth" | Penridge, Criss, Ezrin | 2:27 |
| Total length: | | | 18:18 |

== Credits ==
=== Band ===
- Peter Criss – lead vocals, drums, percussion
- Mark Montague – bass guitar, backing vocals, vocals on tracks 7 and 10.
- Mike Stone – rhythm guitar, vocals on track 5.
- Mike McLaughlin – lead guitar

=== Guest musicians ===
- Ace Frehley – lead guitar on "Bad Attitude", "Walk the Line", and "Blue Moon over Brooklyn"
- Wayne Johnsen – acoustic guitar on "Beth"
- Kirk Miller – guitar
- Dito Godwin – piano on "Blue Moon over Brooklyn", slide guitar on "The Cat", backing vocals
- Doug Shawe – piano
- Stephen Presley – keyboards
- Ed Kanon – cymbals
