= Out of Control (Peter Criss album) =

- Cover art by Todd Schorr

Studio album by Peter Criss
- Released: September 8, 1980
- Recorded: March – July 1980
- Genre: Soft rock
- Length: 38:15
- Label: Casablanca Records
- Producers: David Wolfert, Peter Criss

Peter Criss chronology
Peter Criss (1978)	Out of Control (1980)	Let Me Rock You (1982)

Singles from Out Of Control
- 1. "By Myself" Released: 1980

Out of Control is the second solo studio album by American musician Peter Criss. Recording for the album began in March 1980, when Criss was still officially a member of Kiss. The album sold poorly, and was not re-released on CD until 1997, as the Kiss reunion tour was underway.

The lone single from the album, "By Myself", failed to chart. The album features a hidden bonus track of a cover of "As Time Goes By". The album also included a cover of the song "You Better Run" by The Young Rascals.

Professional ratings
Review scores
Source	Rating
Allmusic	link
Billboard	(mixed)
Record Mirror	3/5 stars
Record Mirror	2/5 stars

== Track listing ==
All songs were written by Peter Criss and Stan Penridge, except where noted.

No.	Title	Writer(s)	Length
1.	"By Myself"	Criss, Penridge, David Wolfert	3:36
2.	"In Trouble Again"		3:22
3.	"Where Will They Run?"		3:54
4.	"I Found Love"	Criss, Penridge, Wolfert	3:30
5.	"There's Nothing Better"		3:34
6.	"Out of Control"		4:03
7.	"Words"		4:44
8.	"You Better Run"	Eddie Brigati, Felix Cavaliere	2:42
9.	"My Life"	Criss, Wolfert, David Buskin	3:42
10.	"Feel Like Letting Go"		5:11
11.	"As Time Goes By" (Intro only)	Herman Hupfeld	0:14

== Personnel ==
- Peter Criss – lead and backing vocals, drums, percussion
- Stan Penridge – guitars, backing vocals
- Steve Lukather – guitars
- David Wolfert – guitars, synthesizer
- Tony Mercandante – bass guitar, backing vocals
- Stu Woods – bass guitar
- Benny Harrison – synthesizer, keyboards, backing vocals
- Ed Walsh – synthesizer, synthesizer programming
- Greg Zanthus Winter – synthesizer programming
- David Buskin – backing vocals
- George Young – saxophone on "Where Will They Run?"

== Album cover ==
The album artwork was created by Todd Schorr from an idea by Criss. Criss' wife at the time, Debra Jensen, served as the inspiration for the blonde woman in the foreground, toward the left side, of the front cover.

== Charts ==
Chart (1980)	Peak position
Australian Albums (Kent Music Report)	48
