= Peter Criss (1978 album) =

- Cover painting by Eraldo Carugati

Studio album by Peter Criss
- Released: September 18, 1978
- Recorded: April–July 1978
- Studios: Electric Lady, New York City; Burbank, Burbank; Sunset Sound, Hollywood
- Genres: Pop rock; soul; R&B; blues
- Length: 34:39
- Label: Casablanca
- Producer: Vini Poncia

Peter Criss chronology
Chelsea (1970)	Peter Criss (1978)	Out of Control (1980)

Singles from Peter Criss
- 1. "Don't You Let Me Down" Released: 1978; 2. "You Matter to Me" Released: 1978

Peter Criss is the debut solo studio album by Peter Criss, the drummer of American rock band Kiss. It was one of four solo albums released by the members of Kiss on September 18, 1978, but yet under the Kiss label, coming out alongside Ace Frehley, Gene Simmons and Paul Stanley. The album was produced by Vini Poncia, who went on to produce Dynasty (1979) and Unmasked (1980) for Kiss.

== Composition ==
Peter Criss, in contrast to the anthemic hard rock of Kiss, was described as "pop rock, sung in the style of Rod Stewart," by Daly Andrew of MusicRadar. "My album reflected my musical taste," Criss explained in his 2012 autobiography Makeup to Breakup. "Motown-inspired R&B with horns and backup singers." Producer Vini Poncia aimed for emotional and relatable songs to Criss, recalling "he was able to do some white R&B, and bluesy kind of things that he grew up with. He was able to show the world a different side to him."

Four of the tracks ("I'm Gonna Love You", "Don't You Let Me Down", "That's the Kind of Sugar Papa Likes" & "Hooked on Rock 'n' Roll") were originally written in 1971 for Criss's pre-Kiss band, Lips. Criss also covers "Tossin' and Turnin'", which was a No. 1 hit for Bobby Lewis in the U.S. during the summer of 1961. The song was subsequently covered by Kiss on their 1979 tour.

== Reception ==
Professional ratings
Review scores
Source	Rating
AllMusic	2/5 stars
Collector's Guide to Heavy Metal	1/10
Pitchfork	0.0/10
The Rolling Stone Album Guide	1/5 stars
Spin Alternative Record Guide	1/10
Uncut	1/5 stars

Reviews for Peter Criss were mostly negative. In a retrospective assessment AllMusic called it "the most undistinguished of the bunch, lacking hooks on either the pop-metal rockers or the power ballads, as well as personality throughout." The album was the lowest charting of all the Kiss solo albums of 1978, reaching No. 43 on the US Billboard album chart. Of the four solo albums, Peter Criss was the only album to have two singles released from it: "Don't You Let Me Down" and "You Matter to Me", neither of which charted. In an interview in Goldmine magazine, Stanley and Simmons dismissed the record as being completely opposite of the aims of what Kiss music was about.

In rankings of Kiss' albums, Peter Criss was named the worst Kiss record by Eduardo Rivadavia of Loudwire, Paul Elliott of Classic Rock, and Matthew Wilkening of Ultimate Classic Rock. Rivadavia interpreted it as "a cry for help, after years trapped in the relentlessly charging Kiss machine, but it was nothing like the chorused cries of 'HELP!' issued by all the fans who bought this sub-yacht-rock debacle." He added that while the 1978 Kiss solo albums were meant as spaces for each member to "just be himself", Criss "clearly misread the memo and decided to 'just be Barry Manilow' instead." Wilkening commented that Criss was "clearly running as far from the band's hard rock sound as possible", instead creating an album that "leans heavily on ballads and the R&B sound of his previous groups. Even considering that, he simply doesn't have the songwriting talent or charisma to front an entire album." Elliott wrote that Criss, a fan of pop and soul music, "turned MOR crooner on lightweight toe-tapping tunes" such as "Don't You Let Me Down" and "That's the Kind of Sugar Papa Likes"; he deemed the ballad "I Can't Stop the Rain" the best song for how it suits Criss' raspy voice, but dismissively added that, overall, Peter Criss contained music that Kiss fans' parents would like. Nonetheless, he wrote that the title of "worst solo album made by a drummer" belonged to Keith Moon's Two Sides of the Moon (1975).

== Track listing ==
All credits adapted from the original release.

All tracks are written by Peter Criss and Stan Penridge, except where noted.

Side one
No.	Title	Writer(s)	Length
1.	"I'm Gonna Love You"		3:18
2.	"You Matter to Me"	Vini Poncia, John Vastano, Michael Morgan	3:15
3.	"Tossin' and Turnin'"	Ritchie Adams, Malou Rene	3:58
4.	"Don't You Let Me Down"		3:38
5.	"That's the Kind of Sugar Papa Likes"		2:59

Side two
No.	Title	Writer(s)	Length
6.	"Easy Thing"		3:53
7.	"Rock Me, Baby"	Sean Delaney	2:50
8.	"Kiss the Girl Goodbye"		2:46
9.	"Hooked on Rock 'n' Roll"		3:37
10.	"I Can't Stop the Rain"	Delaney	4:25
Total length:			34:39

== Cover versions ==
- Harvey Milk covered "Easy Thing" for their compilation album The Singles.
- Awaken covered "I'm Gonna Love You" on their double album Party in Lyceum's Toilets.
- The Slam covered "Hooked on Rock 'n Roll" on their album Hit It!.

== Personnel ==
- Peter Criss – lead vocals, drums on all songs except tracks 6–7 and 10, percussion on track 8, backing vocals

Additional personnel

- Allan Schwartzberg – drums on tracks 6–7 and 10
- Bill Bodine – bass guitar on tracks 1–5 and 9
- Neil Jason – bass guitar on tracks 6–7 and 10
- Art Munson – guitars on tracks 1–5 and 9
- Stan Penridge – guitars on 1–5 and 8–9, backing vocals
- Elliot Randall – guitars on "Easy Thing" and "I Can't Stop the Rain"
- John Tropea – guitars on tracks 6–7 and 10
- Brendan Harkin – guitars on "Easy Thing"
- Steve Lukather – guitar solo on "That's the Kind of Sugar Papa Likes" and "Hooked on Rock and Roll"
- Bill Cuomo – keyboards 1–5 and 9
- Richard Gerstein – keyboards on tracks 6–7, and 10
- Davey Faragher, Tommy Faragher, Danny Faragher, Jimmy Faragher, Maxine Dixon, Maxine Willard, Julia Tillman, Vini Poncia, Annie Sutton, Gordon Grody – backing vocals
- Tom Saviano – Horns arranged
- Michael Carnahan – saxophone solo on "Tossin' and Turnin'", baritone sax on "Hooked on Rock 'n' Roll"
- Lenny Castro – percussion on "Tossin' and Turnin'" and "Don't You Let Me Down"

Production

- Mike D. Stone – engineer at the Record Plant, New York City
- Eraldo Carugati – album artwork

== Charts ==
Chart (1978–1979)	Peak position
Australian Albums (Kent Music Report)	59
Canada Top Albums/CDs (RPM)	52
Japanese Albums (Oricon)	40
US Billboard 200	43

== Certification ==
Region	Certification	Certified units/sales
Canada (Music Canada)	Gold	50,000^{^}
United States (RIAA)	Platinum	1,000,000^{^}
^{^} Shipments figures based on certification alone.

== Release history ==
- Casablanca NBLP-7122 (September 18, 1978): 1st LP issue (with poster)
- Casablanca NBPIX-7122 (September 18, 1978): US picture disc
- Casablanca 826 917-2 (1988): US 1st CD release.
- Mercury 314 532 386-2 (September 16, 1997): Remastered CD (with poster)
- Universal Music B0020537-01 (2014): Remastered LP (with poster)
