= One for All (Peter Criss album) =

Studio album by Peter Criss
- Released: July 23, 2007
- Recorded: 2004–2007
- Studio: Nutmeg Studio
- Genre: Rock
- Length: 50:37
- Label: Megaforce
- Producer: Peter Criss

Peter Criss chronology
Cat#1 (1994)	One for All (2007)	Peter Criss (2025)

One for All is the fifth solo studio album by former Kiss drummer and vocalist Peter Criss, released through Megaforce Records on July 23, 2007. It reached #36 on the Billboard Top Independent Album list. A special hand-signed gold label version was released that day at Best Buy stores in limited quantities.

In his autobiography, Makeup to Breakup: My Life In and Out of Kiss, Criss mentioned that the song "Space Ace" was written about his Kiss bandmate Ace Frehley. He wrote, "I even wrote a song about Ace for the album, "Space Ace". You might think it was a tribute, but I was really writing about Ace’s betrayal of me."

== Track listing ==
No.	Title	Writer(s)	Length
1.	"One for All"	Mike McLaughlin, Peter Criss	4:47
2.	"Doesn't Get Better Than This"	Charles Kipps, McLaughlin, Criss	5:08
3.	"Last Night"	McLaughlin, Criss	4:27
4.	"What a Difference a Day Makes"	Stanley Adams, María Grever	4:25
5.	"Hope"	McLaughlin, Criss	2:47
6.	"Faces in the Crowd"	McLaughlin, Criss	3:36
7.	"Send in the Clowns"	Stephen Sondheim	3:52
8.	"Falling All Over Again"	McLaughlin, Criss	4:42
9.	"Whisper"	McLaughlin, Criss	4:16
10.	"Heart Behind These Hands"	Mark Schoenfeld, Barri McPherson	3:39
11.	"Memories"	McLaughlin, Criss	3:48
12.	"Space Ace"	Criss, Mark Montague	5:10
Total length:			50:37

== Personnel ==
=== Musicians ===
- Peter Criss – lead vocals, drums, percussion, art direction, design
- Will Lee – bass
- Mark Montague – bass, vocals
- Mike McLaughlin – guitar, vocals
- Paul Shaffer – keyboards
- Clifford Carter – keyboards arranger
- All Boys Choir and Jen Johnson – backing vocals

=== Technical ===
- Douglas Heusser – design
- Tom Perkins – engineer
- Chris Jennings, Reed Taylor – assistant engineers
- George Marino – mastering
- Eric Stephen Jacobs – photography

== Charts ==
Chart (2007)	Peak position
U.S. Billboard Top Independent Albums	36
