= Paul Stanley (album) =

- Cover painting by Eraldo Carugati

Studio album by Paul Stanley
- Released: September 18, 1978
- Recorded: February–July 1978
- Studios: Electric Lady and The Record Plant, New York City; The Village Recorder, Los Angeles
- Genre: Hard rock
- Length: 35:10
- Label: Casablanca
- Producers: Paul Stanley, Jeff Glixman

Paul Stanley chronology
| Paul Stanley (1978) | Live to Win (2006) |

Singles from Paul Stanley
- 1. "Hold Me, Touch Me (Think of Me When We're Apart)" Released: 1978

Paul Stanley is the first solo album from American musician Paul Stanley, the singer-songwriter best known for serving as the rhythm guitarist and lead vocalist of hard rock band Kiss. It was one of four solo albums released by the members of Kiss on September 18, 1978, yet still under the Kiss label, and coming out alongside Peter Criss, Ace Frehley, and Gene Simmons. It is the only release out of the four Kiss solo albums to feature all original songs, as Simmons, Criss and Frehley each recorded one cover song on their albums.

== Reception ==
Professional ratings
Review scores
| Source | Rating |
|---|---|
| AllMusic | 3/5 stars |
| Collector's Guide to Heavy Metal | 6/10 |
| Pitchfork | 2.0/10 |
| The Rolling Stone Album Guide | 1/5 stars |
| Spin Alternative Record Guide | 1/10 |
| Uncut | 1/5 stars |

The album reached No. 40 on the US Billboard album chart. AllMusic gave the album 3 stars out of 5 and said that it is the most "Kiss-like" out of all the Kiss solo albums.

== Track listing ==
All credits adapted from the original release.

All tracks are written by Paul Stanley, except tracks 2, 3 and 5, co-written by Mikel Japp.

Side one
| No. | Title | Length |
|---|---|---|
| 1. | "Tonight You Belong to Me" | 4:41 |
| 2. | "Move On" | 3:12 |
| 3. | "Ain't Quite Right" | 3:34 |
| 4. | "Wouldn’t You Like to Know Me" | 3:16 |
| 5. | "Take Me Away (Together as One)" | 5:26 |

Side two
| No. | Title | Length |
|---|---|---|
| 6. | "It's Alright" | 3:38 |
| 7. | "Hold Me, Touch Me (Think of Me When We're Apart)" | 3:40 |
| 8. | "Love in Chains" | 3:34 |
| 9. | "Goodbye" | 4:09 |
| Total length: | | 35:10 |

== Personnel ==
- Paul Stanley – lead and backing vocals, rhythm guitar, lead guitar, acoustic guitar, EBow, all guitars on track 7, producer, mixing

Additional personnel

- Bob Kulick – lead guitar, acoustic guitar
- Steve Buslowe – bass guitar on tracks 1–5
- Eric Nelson – bass guitar on tracks 6–9
- Richie Fontana – drums on tracks 1–4
- Carmine Appice – drums on track 5
- Craig Krampf – drums on tracks 6–9
- Diana Grasselli – backing vocals on track 2
- Miriam Naomi Valle – backing vocals on track 2
- Maria Vidal – backing vocals on track 2
- Peppy Castro – backing vocals on tracks 3 and 7
- Doug Katsaros – piano, Omni string ensemble and backing vocals on track 7
- Steve Lacey – electric guitar on track 8

Production

- Jeff Glixman – engineer, producer (tracks 5, 6, 8, 9)
- Paul Grupp – engineer
- Barbara Isaak – assistant engineer
- Mike D. Stone – mixing at the Record Plant, New York City
- Karat Faye – OD engineer
- George Marino – remastering
- Eraldo Carugati – album artwork

== Charts ==
| Chart (1978–1979) | Peak position |
|---|---|
| Australian Albums (Kent Music Report) | 58 |
| Canada Top Albums/CDs (RPM) | 43 |
| Japanese Albums (Oricon) | 18 |
| US Billboard 200 | 40 |

== Certification ==
| Region | Certification | Certified units/sales |
|---|---|---|
| Canada (Music Canada) | Gold | 50,000^{^} |
| United States (RIAA) | Platinum | 1,000,000^{^} |
^{^} Shipments figures based on certification alone.
