= Stan Penridge =

American musician and producer (1951–2001)

- Stan Penridge in 1984

Background information
- Born: Stanley L. Penridge; January 9, 1951
- Origin: Port Chester, New York
- Died: May 11, 2001 (aged 50)
- Genres: soft rock; hard rock; jazz; country music; Pop rock
- Occupations: Songwriter; musician; producer
- Instruments: Guitar; bass guitar; vocals
- Years active: 1964-2001
- Formerly of: Chelsea; Lips; The Criss-Penridge Alliance

Stanley L. Penridge, better known as Stan Penridge, Stan Doc Penridge or Doc Penridge was an American musician and producer best known for co-writing songs with former Kiss drummer Peter Criss, including Beth.

== Early years ==
Stan Penridge was born in Port Chester, New York on January 9, 1951.

== Music career ==
=== Early work ===
Penridge starting playing music for money since he was 13 in 1964. In 1970, he joined a band called Chelsea which included drummer Peter Criss who would eventually join Kiss. Chelsea released a self-titled album(not with Penridge) in 1970 and never recorded a second album despite having a two-album deal with Decca Records. In August 1971, Chelsea evolved in Lips, a trio consisting of Penridge, and his Chelsea bandmate Peter Criss and Michael Benvenga. By the spring of 1972, Lips was reduced to just the duo of Penridge and Criss. After Peter Criss to join Kiss, Penridge moved on to work with other bands, both rock and country.

=== Work with Kiss ===
In 1976, after Peter Criss introduced Beck (a song he and Penridge wrote together while still in Chelsea and Lips) to the rest of band, he was invited to record and re-write the song with Criss and producer Bob Ezrin into the ballad Beth for the album Destroyer . Afterwards, he co-wrote songs with Criss on every studio album until Dynasty including Criss' 1978 solo album Peter Criss which included four tracks ("I'm Gonna Love You", "Don't You Let Me Down", "That's the Kind of Sugar Papa Likes" & "Hooked on Rock 'n' Roll") that were also originally written in 1971-1972 during their tenure in Lips. .

=== Later years ===
In 1980, after Criss left Kiss, Penridge worked with him on his next solo album, Out of Control, contributing song writing, guitar and backing vocals. In 1983, Penridge and Criss formed The Criss-Penridge Alliance which later turned into The Desperate Man.

=== Solo work ===
After they broke up 1984, Penridge moved to Texas and became an independent musician/producer for acts in the Austin, Texas, area, concentrating mainly on Jazz and Country acts. He also continued to work on his own recordings and was finishing work on a solo album at the time of his death.

=== Royalties issues ===
Little was heard from Penridge publicly until April 2000, when he filed a lawsuit against the KISS Company and Universal (amongst others) for back payment of royalties he claimed to have never received on over 30 songs. The case is was continuing, with a court date set for early 2002, which never happened due to his death.

== Personal life ==
Stan Penridge was married to Nell Penridge for almost 30 years until his death. They had a son named Jesse Penridge.

== Death ==
On May 11, 2001, Stan Penridge died in his sleep at his home in Austin, Texas at the age of 50, though no official public cause of death was specified.

== Discography ==
=== With Peter Criss ===
Studio albums

- Peter Criss (1978)
- Out of Control (1980)
- Cat No. 1 (1994) (Co-wrote Beth)

=== With Kiss ===
Studio albums

- Destroyer (1976) (Co-wrote Beth)
- Rock and Roll Over (1976) (Co-wrote Baby Driver)
- Love Gun (1977) (Co-wrote Hooligan)
- Dynasty (1979) (Co-wrote Dirty Livin')
