= Debra Jensen =

American model (born 1958)

Playboy centerfold appearance
- January 1978
- Preceded by: Ashley Cox
- Succeeded by: Janis Schmitt

Personal details
- Born: March 12, 1958 (age 68) Orange County, California, United States
- Height: 5 ft 8 in (1.73 m)

Debra Jensen (born Debra Svensk on March 12, 1958, in Orange County, California) is an American model. She was Playboy magazine's Playmate of the Month for its January 1978 issue. Her centerfold was photographed by Phillip Dixon. Jensen was also on the cover of the March, 1978 issue of Playboy magazine. After her time as a Playboy model, she began modeling for Coppertone. More recently, Jensen has appeared on a couple of episodes of the reality TV series The Girls Next Door.

== Personal ==
Jensen grew up in Southern California. As a teenager she worked at a Baskin-Robbins Ice Cream shop. She was Kiss drummer Peter Criss's second wife. Criss started dating Jensen while still married to his first wife, Lydia. During her marriage to Peter Criss, she again used her birth name Debra Svensk. She has a daughter with Criss, Jennilee Criss. As of 2011 she was married to Robert McMurry.

== See also ==
- List of people in Playboy 1970–1979
- List of Playboy Playmates of 1978

Debra Jensen	Janis Schmitt	Christina Smith	Pamela Bryant	Kathryn Morrison	Gail Stanton
Karen Morton	Vicki Witt	Rosanne Katon	Marcy Hanson	Monique St. Pierre	Janet Quist
