= Unmasked (Kiss album) =

1980 studio album by Kiss

- Cover art by Victor Stabin

Studio album by Kiss
- Released: May 20, 1980
- Recorded: January–March 1980
- Studios: The Record Plant, New York City
- Genres: Hard rock; pop rock; power pop
- Length: 39:46
- Label: Casablanca
- Producer: Vini Poncia

Kiss chronology
Dynasty (1979)	Unmasked (1980)	Music from "The Elder" (1981)

Singles from Unmasked
- 1. "Shandi" Released: June 1, 1980; 2. "Talk to Me" Released: August 24, 1980; 3. "Tomorrow" Released: November 1, 1980; 4. "Is That You?" Released: 1980; 5. "What Makes The World Go 'Round" Released: 1980

Unmasked is the eighth studio album by American rock band Kiss, released on May 20, 1980, by Casablanca Records. Continuing the band's departure from hard rock, the album has a more pop-friendly sound, but with less disco influence. Drummer and founding member Peter Criss (largely absent from the preceding Dynasty, only performing on the song "Dirty Livin'") is not present on any tracks. Despite having no involvement in its production, Criss features in the album's artwork, the video for "Shandi" and receives credit.

Unmasked is often considered a "flop" or at least a commercial disappointment compared to the band's earlier success, with the dubious distinction of being the first non-platinum Kiss album since Dressed to Kill (1975), only reaching No. 35 on the Billboard 200, the worst position for the band since Hotter Than Hell (1974), and only one of the singles, "Shandi", charting in the U.S. Still, it was certified gold by the RIAA on July 30, 1980, reached the top five in several countries, and was one of the band's most successful albums in Oceania.

Critical reception of Unmasked was equally poor, with even bassist Gene Simmons opining "it's a shitty album," and vocalist and rhythm guitarist Paul Stanley calling it "wimpy" and a "pretty crappy album" but defended "Tomorrow" as "really a great song." In recent years, the album has garnered some positive reappraisal, with Ultimate Classic Rock considering it a "highly underrated power-pop gem," but is still unpopular with Kiss fans, and blamed for the band's early 1980s slump, due to alienating their loyal hard rock audience.

== Background ==
After each member of Kiss had recorded eponymous solo albums, which were simultaneously released on September 18, 1978, the band reunited with the goal of further expanding its audience by incorporating elements of pop and the then massively popular disco genre into their hard rock sound. "We thought that it wasn’t enough to be just a rock ‘n’ roll band, which is a big mistake actually," Gene Simmons confessed in Behind the Mask.

The resulting album was 1979's Dynasty, which earned platinum certification in five countries, with the disco-influenced "I Was Made for Lovin' You" becoming a smash hit on the pop singles chart. Despite this, the loyal hard rock audience Kiss had spent half a decade building felt betrayed, and neither they nor the band's new found pop crowd turned up in large enough numbers to make the expensive "Return of Kiss" tour a success. To make matters worse, the popularity of disco had plummeted after July 12, 1979, otherwise known as "the day disco died", but hard rock was still unpopular, leaving the next album's musical style up in the air.

Simmons and Paul Stanley wanted to go in a pop rock and power pop direction on the band's next album, but Ace Frehley hoped for a return to their hard rock roots. As a compromise, the album has a slick, contemporary sound with elements of new wave, but Frehley's three songs ("Talk to Me", "Two Sides of the Coin" and the Vini Poncia co-written "Torpedo Girl") are heavier. Peter Criss, who the band considered firing, had no input in Unmasked's musical direction. Contrary to its name, the album is part of the band's "makeup era", with a true unmasking not coming until three years later on Lick It Up.

== Recording ==
Why did we do poppier songs on Unmasked? Well, those were the kind of songs that Paul was writing. It wasn't my idea to come in and change anything. They were taking advantage of my pop sensibilities in those areas and I was taking advantage of certain songwriting talents that Paul and Gene had in those areas. Paul and Gene have never done anything that they didn't want to do. They wanted to find out if they could work in that pop area and be effective.

— Vini Poncia, producer

The album features substantial contributions from producer Vini Poncia, who had been Ringo Starr's post-Beatles songwriting partner. All tracks bar Ace Frehley's "Talk to Me" and "Two Sides of the Coin" were written or co-written by someone outside the band. Anton Fig is the drummer on all songs, and six out of 11 songs feature only one member of the band Kiss: Ace Frehley performs all guitars, bass and vocals on his three songs, Paul Stanley does the same on "Tomorrow" and "Easy as it Seems", and on "Shandi", Stanley and Fig are joined by Tom Harper on bass. Future hit songwriter and Spider member Holly Knight plays keyboards on most songs but was uncredited.

Unmasked is the first Kiss album without all four original members, as drummer and founding member Peter Criss, largely absent from the preceding Dynasty, only performing on the song, "Dirty Livin'", is not present on any tracks. Despite this, he's featured in the artwork, the video for "Shandi", and receives credit. Anton Fig fills his role, but is uncredited for doing so, while Vini Poncia is producer, going for a slicker, poppier sound, with less disco influence. It also continues the trend of Kiss placing more trust on its producers, which Gene Simmons later regreted, and possibly led to the album's "overproduction."

A promotional video for "Shandi" proved Criss's final performance with Kiss until a cameo at a Kiss Convention on June 17, 1995. In the band's authorized biography, the drummer revealed that he was the last one in the band's dressing room after filming and he broke down crying. The album cover and poster insert, designed by artist Victor Stabin, featured a winking Criss. "Unmasked was like the tail end of a comet," reflected Stanley, "and I don't mean Frehley's."

== Release ==
Unmasked went on sale on May 20, 1980, through Casablanca Records and reached number 35 on the Billboard 200, the worst position for the group since Hotter Than Hell in 1974. It was certified gold by the RIAA on July 30, 1980, but failed to reach platinum status. However, the album topped the charts in Norway and New Zealand, and reached the top five in Australia, Austria, Germany and the Netherlands.

Five singles were released from Unmasked, the most of any Kiss album. The first, "Shandi", was released on June 1, 1980, reaching only No. 47 in the United States, but peaking at No. 1 in Argentina. In Australia, New Zealand and Norway, it reached the top 10. "Talk to Me" was the next single outside the United States. It went on sale on August 24 and its highest position was number ten in Switzerland. "Tomorrow" was the third single – the second in the United States – going on sale November 1, and only charting in Germany, where it reached No. 70. "Is That You?" was only released in the Netherlands and failed to chart, as did "What Makes The World Go 'Round", the fifth and final single.

== Critical reception ==
Professional ratings
Review scores
Source	Rating
AllMusic	2/5 stars
Collector's Guide to Heavy Metal	4/10
The Encyclopedia of Popular Music	2/5 stars
Pitchfork	0.8/10
The Rolling Stone Album Guide	1/5 stars
Uncut	1/5 stars

According to David Fricke of Rolling Stone, it "lacks the madness and amplified delusions of Love Gun and Alive!" while "Shandi" "suggests the Doobie Brothers with kabuki makeup". Fricke described songs such as "She's So European", "Easy as It Seems" and "You're All That I Want" as "disappointingly boring" and wrote that Vini Poncia's "sterile production" left "in the background the guitars and the harrowing voices of yesteryear."

Jason Josephes of Pitchfork wrote that, until he heard it, he could not discern "how bad it was" and that he preferred to remain in ignorance for the rest of his life. Rustyn Rose of Examiner.com concluded that Unmasked "is Kiss's adaptation to the new wave movement [and] far from the classic Kiss sound." Martin Popoff described Unmasked as "a contrived mess of the most gutless and badly written tracks from the boys' middling solo albums." Stephen Thomas Erlewine of AllMusic commented that the songs are unmemorable, the group uninspired and "the music made it clear that it was time for Kiss to make a change."

Matthew Wilkening of Ultimate Classic Rock hailed it as "an underrated gem of power pop" and wrote that "Frehley manages to eclipse everyone by adding enough distorted guitars to bring together a sound comparable to the Rolling Stones [in] 'Two Sides of the Coin', 'Talk to Me' and the wonderfully insane 'Torpedo Girl'."

"It's a shitty album," Gene Simmons remarked of Unmasked in 1993. "I'd be ashamed to play it for [my mother] or anybody else!" "My least favourite Kiss albums are probably the disco-era ones – probably Unmasked," he said in 2004. "I took my eye off the ball and started to trust producers."

== Legacy ==
A lip-synched German television performance of "Talk to Me" and "She's So European" featured the debut of Eric Carr, who became the band's permanent drummer until he died in 1991. The band played a single concert in the US to officially introduce Carr as Criss's replacement at the Palladium Theatre in New York City. Kiss then toured Europe and Australia (where their popularity was at an all-time high) and played "Is That You?", "Talk to Me", "Shandi" and for a short time, "You're All That I Want". Otherwise, the album's songs have been largely ignored in following live performances, bar "Shandi", which is sometimes played, particularly in Australia (where the song became a top ten hit in 1980). "Talk to Me" was played in 2001 during Australian and Japanese legs of the Farewell Tour, but has not been performed since Frehley's second exit. More recently, "Is That You?" was performed on Kiss Kruise VII in November 2017.

In 1999, German label Aor Heaven released Undressed – An Unmasked Tribute To Kiss, with various artists covering the entire album.

== Track listing ==
On the rear cover of the original release as well as the vinyl reissues, the songs are listed alphabetically rather than the order they appear on the album.

All credits adapted from the original release.

Side one
No.	Title	Writer(s)	Lead vocals	Length
1.	"Is That You?"	Gerard McMahon	Paul Stanley	3:59
2.	"Shandi"	Stanley, Vini Poncia	Stanley	3:36
3.	"Talk to Me"	Ace Frehley	Frehley	4:00
4.	"Naked City"	Gene Simmons, Poncia, Peppy Castro, Bob Kulick	Simmons	3:49
5.	"What Makes the World Go 'Round"	Stanley, Poncia	Stanley	4:14

Side two
No.	Title	Writer(s)	Lead vocals	Length
6.	"Tomorrow"	Stanley, Poncia	Stanley	3:18
7.	"Two Sides of the Coin"	Frehley	Frehley	3:16
8.	"She's So European"	Simmons, Poncia	Simmons	3:30
9.	"Easy as It Seems"	Stanley, Poncia	Stanley	3:24
10.	"Torpedo Girl"	Frehley, Poncia	Frehley	3:44
11.	"You're All That I Want"	Simmons, Poncia	Simmons	3:04

== Personnel ==
=== Kiss ===
- Paul Stanley – vocals, guitar solo on "You're All That I Want"; lead guitar on "Shandi", "Is That You?" and "What Makes the World Go 'Round"; all guitars and bass on "Tomorrow" and "Easy as It Seems"
- Gene Simmons – vocals, bass; rhythm guitar on "You're All That I Want"
- Ace Frehley – vocals, lead guitar, acoustic guitar, guitar solo on "Naked City", all guitars & bass on "Talk to Me", "Two Sides of the Coin" and "Torpedo Girl"
- Peter Criss – drums (credited, but does not play)

=== Additional personnel ===
- Anton Fig – drums
- Vini Poncia – keyboards, percussion, backing vocals, producer
- Tom Harper – bass on "Shandi"
- Holly Knight – keyboards

=== Production ===
- Jay Messina – engineer, mixing
- Gray Russell – assistant engineer
- George Marino – mastering at Sterling Sound, New York

== Charts ==
=== Weekly charts ===
Chart (1980)	Peak position
Australian Albums (Kent Music Report)	3
Austrian Albums (Ö3 Austria)	3
Canada Top Albums/CDs (RPM)	12
Dutch Albums (Album Top 100)	13
German Albums (Offizielle Top 100)	4
Italian Albums (Musica e Dischi)	11
Japanese Albums (Oricon)	15
New Zealand Albums (RMNZ)	1
Norwegian Albums (VG-lista)	1
Spain (AFYVE)	11
Swedish Albums (Sverigetopplistan)	17
UK Albums (Official Charts)	48
US Billboard 200	35

==== Year-end charts ====
Chart (1980)	Position
German Albums (Offizielle Top 100)	25
Australian Albums (Kent Music Report)	11

== Certifications ==
Region	Certification	Certified units/sales
Australia (ARIA)	Platinum	50,000^{^}
Canada (Music Canada)	Gold	50,000^{^}
New Zealand (RMNZ)	Platinum	15,000^{^}
Norway (IFPI Norway)	Gold	50,000
United States (RIAA)	Gold	500,000^{^}
^{^} Shipments figures based on certification alone.
