= Vini Poncia =

American musician, songwriter and producer

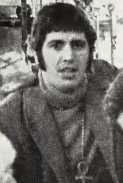

Background information
- Birth name: Vincent Poncia Jr.
- Born: April 29, 1942 (age 82); Providence, Rhode Island, U.S.
- Occupations: Musician; songwriter; record producer

Vincent "Vini" Poncia Jr. (born April 29, 1942) is an American musician, songwriter and record producer.

== Life and career ==
=== Early life ===
Poncia was born in Providence, Rhode Island. He is of Italian ancestry.

=== The 1960s ===
In the 1960s, Poncia formed a songwriting team with Peter Anders (né Peter Andreoli). An album of songs co-written by these childhood friends, The Anders & Poncia Album, was produced by Richard Perry and released in 1969. Their songs were recorded by artists including the Ronettes, Bobby Bloom, and Darlene Love. Anders and Poncia were also members of the Trade Winds (later called The Innocence). The Trade Winds' debut single "New York is a Lonely Town" reached #32 on the Billboard Hot 100 chart in 1965.

In 1968, with Frankie Meluso (aka Mell) and Peter Anders, Poncia founded MAP (Mell Anders Poncia) City Records in New York City. Their company included a small recording studio brought from a 3 track studio to four tracks (on a Scully Machine) by their chief engineer, Peter H. Rosen, who recorded sixteen albums before the company dissolved in 1970.

=== The 1970s ===
During the 1970s, Poncia became Ringo Starr's co-writer, and appeared on several of his solo albums: Ringo (1973), Goodnight Vienna (1974), Ringo's Rotogravure (1976), Ringo the 4th (1977), and Bad Boy (1978). He also produced albums for Melissa Manchester and Lynda Carter's 1978 album Portrait. As a songwriter, he wrote songs for Jackie DeShannon, Martha Reeves, and Tommy James. Poncia is also listed as co-writer on "You Make Me Feel Like Dancing" with Leo Sayer. He was also the producer for The Faragher Brothers albums, Open Your Eyes (1978) and The Faraghers (1979).

In 1978, he produced Peter Criss' 1978 solo album. At Criss's prompting, Poncia was brought in to produce Kiss's 1979 album Dynasty and co-wrote their hit song "I Was Made for Lovin' You" from that album.

=== The 1980s ===
Poncia also produced another Kiss album, 1980's Unmasked. He sang backup vocals and helped with songwriting on both albums, having eight co-writing credits on Unmasked.

In 1981, he produced the album Turn Out The Lights for the band Tycoon.

Poncia also produced the Detroit rock band Adrenalin and their song "Road of the Gypsy", from the film Iron Eagle in 1985. He also produced DC Drive and their self-titled album in 1991. Poncia produced Criss's second post-Kiss solo album, 1982's Let Me Rock You, and he was credited as co-writer for five songs on Kiss's 1989 release, Hot in the Shade.
