= Peter Criss =

American drummer and singer (born 1945)

- Criss in 2025

Background information
- Also known as: "The Catman"
- Born: Peter George John Criscuola; December 20, 1945 (age 80); New York City, New York, U.S.
- Genres: Hard rock; heavy metal; jazz; swing
- Occupation: Musician
- Instruments: Drums; percussion; vocals
- Years active: 1964–2017; 2025
- Formerly of: Kiss; Chelsea; Lips; Barracudas; The Sounds Of Soul; Balls Of Fire; The Keep; The Criss-Penridge Alliance; Criss
- Website: petercriss.net

Peter George John Criscuola (born December 20, 1945), better known by his stage name Peter Criss, is an American musician, best known as a co-founder, original drummer, and a vocalist of the hard rock band Kiss. Criss established the Catman character for his Kiss persona. In 2014 he was inducted into the Rock and Roll Hall of Fame as a member of Kiss.

== Early years ==
Criss was born in Brooklyn, New York, to Loretta and Joseph Criscuola, who raised their five children (of whom Peter was the eldest) as Roman Catholics. Joseph Criscuola's family came from Scafati, Salerno, Italy. Criss grew up in the Williamsburg section of Brooklyn and was a childhood friend of Jerry Nolan, who would later find success as the drummer of the New York Dolls. He was an avid art student and a swing aficionado. While playing with bandleader Joey Greco, Criss ended up studying under his idol, Gene Krupa, at the Metropole Club in New York.

== Music career ==
=== Early bands ===
Criss was involved with several bands through the mid-to-late 1960s, starting with the Barracudas from 1962 to 1966 and including Chelsea, who had a two-album deal with Decca Records. The group released their self-titled debut in 1970, and never recorded a second album. In August 1971, Chelsea evolved into Lips (a trio consisting of Criss and his Chelsea bandmates Michael Benvenga and Stan Penridge). By the spring of 1972, Lips was reduced to just the duo of Criss and Penridge.

Around 1973, ex-Chelsea members Pete Shepley and Mike Brand recorded an unreleased album which included post-Chelsea Michael Benvenga, and pre-Kiss Peter Criss and Gene Simmons as session musicians. It was titled Captain Sanity.

Another early band featuring Criss was The Sounds of Soul, notable for also featuring Nolan on drums and The Elegants guitarist Joe Lucenti, whom Criss met in his previous band The Barracudas. The core of the band - Criss, Lucenti and keyboardist Peppi Genarelli - played together from 1966 to 1969. In the summer of 1968, they performed as Brotherhood, and from late 1968 under the name The Vintage. Criss and Genarelli then continued to the band Nautilus which existed until late 1970. In 1972-73 Criss and Lucenti were playing together again in Infinity.

=== Kiss ===
The Catman

After the demise of his band Lips, Criss placed an advertisement in the East Coast edition of Rolling Stone Magazine, which read:

EXPD. ROCK & roll drummer looking for orig. grp. doing soft & hard music. Peter, Brooklyn.

The advertisement was answered by Paul Stanley and Gene Simmons, who were looking for new members for their band. Ace Frehley was added to the lineup in December 1972, and the band was named Kiss later that month. Simmons describes first meeting Criss in his book Kiss And Make-Up thus:

One afternoon I ran across an ad in Rolling Stone Magazine that said "Drummer available – Will do anything." I called the guy on the telephone, and even though he was in the middle of a party, he took my call. I introduced myself and said we were starting a band and that the band was looking for a drummer, and was he willing to do anything to make it? He says that he was, right away.

Simmons later in the chapter describes going to a small Italian club in Brooklyn to meet the drummer: "The drummer started to sing, and this Wilson Pickett-style voice came out of him. Paul and I said, 'That's it, that's our drummer.' His name was Peter Criscuola."

Kiss released their self-titled debut in February 1974. Throughout the band's initial lineup, Paul and Gene would sing the majority of the songs on each studio album, with Peter, and later Ace, contributing vocals for one or two songs. Throughout his Kiss career, in his original tenure and on the Reunion-era album Psycho Circus, Criss was the lead singer on several songs which turned out to be radio-hit and/or live favorites, including "Black Diamond", "Hard Luck Woman", and "Beth".

Criss had collaborated on a demo originally titled "Beck", a ballad that was eventually reworked to become "Beth" (a demo exists of the song from 1971). The song was actually written while Criss was still a member of Chelsea. Criss came up with the melody for the song while on a train to New York City from New Jersey where the band practiced. He and Penridge wrote the song together. "Beth" became a Top 10 hit for Kiss on the U.S. Billboard Hot 100 chart, peaking at No. 7 in 1976. It remains the highest-charting song for Kiss in the United States and earned them a People's Choice Award for "Young People's Favorite New Song" in 1977 (tied with "Disco Duck").

=== Departure from Kiss ===
On the 1979 release Dynasty, he played only on his own composition, "Dirty Livin'", and did not play at all on Unmasked (1980) but was seen on the album covers and music videos for songs from those albums. Anton Fig, who also played on Ace Frehley's 1978 solo album, was hired as session drummer for Dynasty and Unmasked, but did not tour; Criss performed on the Dynasty tour and Eric Carr on the tour for Unmasked. At the time, the reasons Criss was fired from Kiss were never made public, although it was obvious that his relationship with his bandmates Gene Simmons and Paul Stanley was not good at the time.

Simmons has said Criss was fired; Stanley has discussed Criss's departure in several interviews, including the commentary on Kissology 2. Ace Frehley in his 2011 book, No Regrets, stated that Criss was fired during a band meeting in which Frehley, Simmons, Stanley and Kiss' first manager Bill Aucoin voted Criss out of the band. A spoken word CD released in 1999 titled 13 Classic Kiss Stories features Aucoin, who also discusses Criss being "let go". Criss, however, has maintained that he quit the band.

The video for "Shandi" (a song Criss did not play on; the only Kiss member featured on the studio recording was Stanley) was shot in one day, and Criss was out of the band at that time; Stanley said of the shoot, "We shot a video for the song 'Shandi' after the decision to let Peter go had been confirmed. He came to the video shoot knowing it was the last time he would appear with KISS. At the end of the day, he took his makeup case with him and left. It wasn't tearful, but it was a big moment. Peter was leaving. We had fired him, and this was the last time we were going to see him in the band".

Criss officially left Kiss on May 18, 1980. As a result, Kiss postponed the European tour until the end of August, thus giving the band enough time to find a replacement drummer, who they found in Brooklyn-born Eric Carr.

=== Beginning of solo career ===
In March 1980 Criss began recording his second solo album, Out of Control. Released later in the year, the album was a commercial failure, despite remaining a favorite with Criss fans. The follow-up album, 1982's Let Me Rock You, which contained one song written by Gene Simmons, was a similar failure. The album cover featured Criss without his Kiss makeup, but was not released in the U.S. at the time.

For the rest of the 1980s and early 1990s Criss was involved with a number of bands, each usually lasting less than a year. One of them was The Keep (1988-1990), which featured ex-Kiss guitarist Mark St. John and ex-Black Sabbath and White Tiger frontman David Donato. Criss also played with Los Angeles Balls of Fire from the spring of 1986 to December 1986, with Jane Booke on lead vocals, Bobby Raylove on bass, and on guitar, John Pakalenka, who currently plays for Buckner Funken Jazz in Denver, Colorado. Balls of Fire played only seven shows before Criss left the band (reportedly to enjoy his daughter Jenilee growing up). Another relatively short-lived band was the Criss Penridge Alliance, essentially Peter Criss and Stan Penridge with the 1970s jazz rock fusion band Montage: Mike Hutchens – guitar, Allen Woody – bass (Govt Mule, Allman Brothers Band), John Moss – drums and Tony Crow – keyboards. The band rehearsed 39 songs, including from the first three Peter Criss solo albums, and played around 10 shows in total.

While Kiss was promoting their upcoming release Crazy Nights, Criss appeared on the syndicated radio program Metal Shop and discussed his time in Kiss from a more positive perspective than before; he promoted the book he was writing at the time, an autobiography to be titled A Face without a Kiss. He also mentioned his dream of one day opening his own recording studio and starting a Catman Records label.

In 1989, Criss appeared on Ace Frehley's solo album, Trouble Walkin' , providing percussion and backing vocals on 4 tracks.

In the early 1990s Criss assembled a band named "Criss", featuring among others future Queensrÿche guitarist Mike Stone. This band went through frequent lineup changes, toured extensively and released the Criss EP in December 1993 and the Cat #1 album in August 1994, which also featured Ace Frehley on three tracks, providing lead guitar.

=== Christopher Dickinson ===
In 1991 a man named Christopher Dickinson began publicly impersonating Peter Criss. Dickinson did an interview as Criss with the tabloid Star magazine, in which he claimed that he was now a "homeless alcoholic panhandling for change". Phil Donahue had both men on his show where the real Criss confronted the impostor.

=== Return to Kiss ===
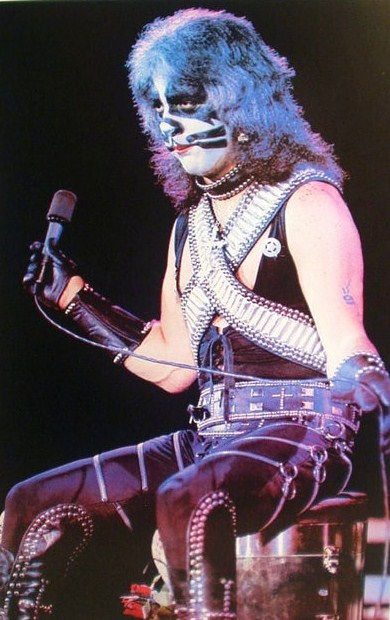
Criss performing with Kiss in 1977

In 1995, Criss appeared at the official Kiss Konvention in Los Angeles that led to the Kiss live performance that was recorded for MTV Unplugged. On February 28, 1996, the original members of Kiss made a surprise appearance at the 38th Annual Grammy Awards in full makeup and costumes for the first time together since 1979 to present an award with Tupac Shakur. Subsequently, in April 1996, Kiss held a press conference to announce a reunion tour with all four original members. The 1996–97 Alive/Worldwide Tour was an enormous success, and the reunited Kiss released a studio album, 1998's Psycho Circus.

Criss played drums on only one track on the album ("Into the Void", Ace Frehley's one lead vocal track), although Criss did have one lead vocal (a track called "I Finally Found My Way", written by guitarist/vocalist Paul Stanley and Bob Ezrin) and a co-vocal taking turns in the verses with the rest of the band for the song "You Wanted the Best".

=== Second and third departures ===
Criss left over a contract dispute and was replaced by Eric Singer in 2001. He rejoined the band in late 2002 and appeared on the Kiss Symphony: Alive IV DVD and CD before departing from Kiss again in March 2004. The band had opted not to renew his contract following the Rocksimus Maximus Tour. He was once again replaced by Singer, who assumed the "Catman" persona. He said of Kiss performing with replacements for Ace Frehley and himself:

No matter who they get to put stuff on their face, it ain't us. You can take the mask off the Lone Ranger and put it on someone else, but it ain't the Lone Ranger.

=== After 2004 ===
Since 2004 Criss has kept his public appearances to a minimum. He now resides in Wall Township, New Jersey. He released a solo album, titled One for All, in July 2007 on Silvercat Records, and performed his last solo show on June 17, 2017, in New York City at the Cutting Room.

In April 2025 it was announced that Criss would release a hard rock solo album produced by Barry Pointer and featuring performances by Billy Sheehan, Piggy D., John 5, Mike McLaughlin and Paul Shaffer. It was originally set to be released in the fall. On October 31, 2025, Criss revealed his second self-titled album, which was released on December 19 that year.

Despite leaving Kiss in 2004, Criss would publicly reunite with former Kiss band members Gene Simmons and Paul Stanley when they received a 2025 Kennedy Center Honors on December 7, 2025.

== Personal life ==
As of November 2008 Criss has been married three times: Lydia Di Leonardo (1970–79); fashion model Debra Jensen (1979–94); and Gigi Criss (since May 1998). Criss has a daughter, born in 1981, Jenilee Criss.

Criss was diagnosed with breast cancer in 2008. While working out, he noticed a lump on his chest that prompted him to visit a doctor. He was successfully treated with a lumpectomy.

Criss released his autobiography, Makeup to Breakup: My Life In and Out of Kiss, co-written with author Larry Sloman, in late 2012. In 2017, Criss retired from touring at the age of 71.

== In media ==
In addition to playing himself in 1978's Kiss Meets the Phantom of the Park and 1999's Detroit Rock City, Criss has appeared on two television programs in minor roles.

In 2002 he appeared in two episodes of the HBO prison drama Oz as inmate Martin Montgomery. He played the role of Mike in the motion picture about the JFK assassination, Frame of Mind.

Criss played himself, as well as the cameo role of "Nice Cop", in "...Thirteen Years Later", the 1998 third-season Halloween episode of Millennium.

== Discography ==
Studio albums

- Peter Criss (1978)
- Out of Control (1980)
- Let Me Rock You (1982)
- Cat No. 1 (1994)
- One for All (2007)
- Peter Criss (2025)

=== Chelsea ===
Studio albums:

- Chelsea (1970)

=== Kiss ===
Studio albums:

- Kiss (1974)
- Hotter than Hell (1974)
- Dressed to Kill (1975)
- Destroyer (1976)
- Rock and Roll Over (1976)
- Love Gun (1977)
- Dynasty (1979)
- Unmasked (1980) (credited, but does not play)
- Psycho Circus (1998)

Live albums:

- Alive! (1975)
- Alive II (1977)
- Kiss Unplugged (1996)
- You Wanted the Best, You Got the Best!! (1996)
- Kiss Symphony: Alive IV (2003)
- Alive! The Millennium Concert (2006)
- Off the Soundboard: Donington 1996 (2022)
- Off the Soundboard: Des Moines 1977 (2022)
- Dressed to Kill 50th Anniversary Set (2025)
- Alive! 50th Anniversary Box Set (2025)
- Kiss Destroys Anaheim '76 (2026)

=== Guest appearances ===
- Black 'n Blue – Nasty Nasty (1986)
- Ace Frehley – Trouble Walkin' (1989)
- Ace Frehley – Greatest Hits Live (2006)
- Richie Scarlet – "The Catman & the Emperor" (2021)
- John 5 and The Creatures – Sinner (2021)

Preceded by Original	Drummer for Kiss; 1973–1980	Succeeded by Eric Carr
Preceded by Eric Singer	Drummer for Kiss; 1996–2001	Succeeded by Eric Singer
Preceded by Eric Singer	Drummer for Kiss; 2002–2004	Succeeded by Eric Singer
