= Psycho Circus World Tour =

1998–1999 concert tour by Kiss

- Tour by Kiss
- Tour program cover
- Associated album: Psycho Circus
- Start date: October 31, 1998
- End date: April 24, 1999
- Legs: 3
- No. of shows: 68 scheduled, 6 cancelled

Kiss concert chronology
- Alive/Worldwide Tour (1996–1997); Psycho Circus World Tour (1998–1999); The Farewell Tour (2000–2001)

The Psycho Circus World Tour was a concert tour by the American rock band Kiss that started on October 31, 1998 and concluded on April 24, 1999.

== Background ==
This concert tour was the first to implement 3D imagery and effects with glasses included, as well as a big video screen.

In the tour program for the band's final tour, Simmons reflected on the tour:

The Psycho Circus tour was far and above anything that people have ever seen. It started with a concept called "Psycho Circus" our manager Doc McGhee was talking about. He goes, "Wouldn't it be great if the tour was like a 'Psycho Circus' thing and anything was possible?" On that tour we utilized spectacular 3-D technology. There were certain parts of the show where the fans put on their 3D glasses to experience the full spectrum of the visual effects. With that tour, we wanted to bring back the fun to rock and roll with a kick-ass rock and roll show.

== Reception ==
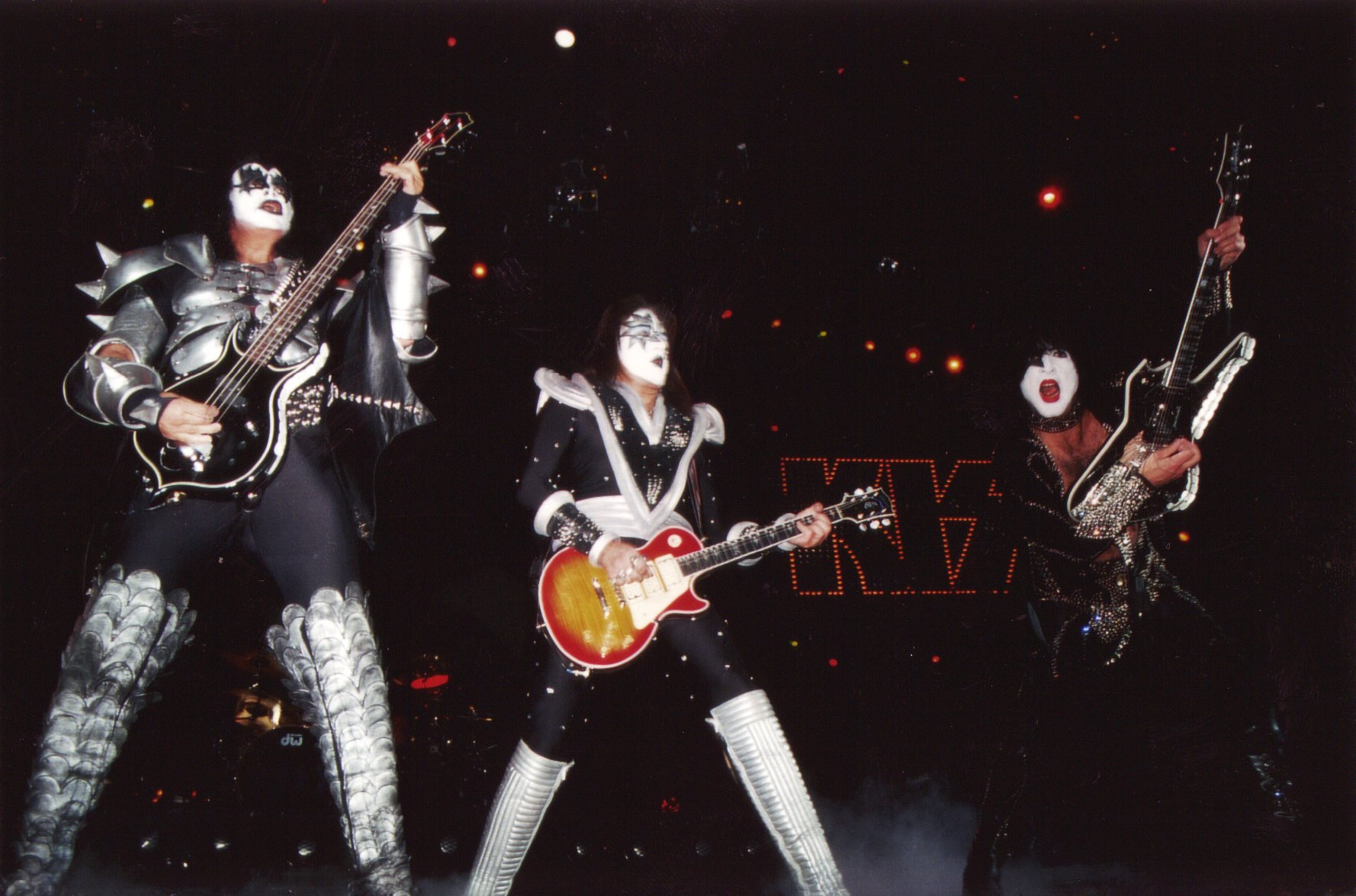
Kiss performing in Paris on March 22, 1999

A local reporter from the Los Angeles Times, gave the first show at Dodger Stadium a mixed review. The reporter noted on the wrinkles of the aging superstars 'creasing their Kabuki-style makeup' and the attraction of the over-the-top, 70s-vintage rock sound. Concluding the review, the reporter stated that what mattered the most to the band and the fans was 'preserving the sweetest essence of rock 'n' roll: attitude'.

A reviewer from the Milwaukee Journal Sentinel, gave the December 20, 1998 performance a positive review, stating: "The Kiss Army was treated to more than two hours of fireworks, 30-foot-high columns of flame, lascivious tongue-wriggling, pelvic gyrations, confetti blizzards, levitating drum risers, fake blood spitting, synchronized high-kicking, fire-breathing, and 3-D imagery splashed across several jumbo screens. There was music too, of course: fuzzy monster chords, throbbing bass, and anthem after anthem in praise of rocking all night and partying every day... the 3-D gimmick was a one-trick pony and not nearly as entertaining as the band's other shenanigans."

One reporter from Nashville, reported on Frehley during the show at the Nashville Arena on January 2, 1999, stating that the lead guitarist was smoking, noting on the special effects that his guitar's body had with the white smoke and Roman candle blasts fired to the arena's roof. The reporter concluded their review, stating on how every song was about how neato it is to rock and roll all night and party every day.

== Set list ==
1. "Psycho Circus"
2. "Shout It Out Loud"
3. "Deuce"
4. "Do You Love Me?"
5. "Firehouse"
6. "Shock Me"
7. "Let Me Go, Rock 'n' Roll"
8. "Calling Dr. Love"
9. "Into the Void"
10. "King of the Night Time World"
11. "God of Thunder"
12. "Within"
13. "Cold Gin"
14. "Love Gun"
15. "100,000 Years"
16. "Rock and Roll All Nite"

Encore

17. "Beth"
18. "Detroit Rock City"
19. "Black Diamond"
- "She" and "Nothin' to Lose" only played in Dodger Stadium of Los Angeles.
- "Makin' Love" was added from the second show onwards but was dropped after a few performances.
- "Cold Gin" was dropped after Gothenburg show on March 5.
- "I Was Made for Lovin' You" was played early in the tour but was dropped after a few performances. It was played again on the European and Latin American tour.

== Tour dates ==
List of concerts, showing date, city, country, venue, and opening acts
Date	City	Country	Venue	Opening Act(s)
North America
October 31, 1998	Los Angeles	United States	Dodger Stadium^{1}	The Smashing Pumpkins
November 12, 1998	Boston	United States	FleetCenter	Econoline Crush
November 13, 1998	Boston	United States	FleetCenter	Econoline Crush
November 15, 1998	Albany	United States	Pepsi Arena	Econoline Crush
November 16, 1998	Portland	United States	Cumberland County Civic Center	Econoline Crush
November 18, 1998	University Park	United States	Bryce Jordan Center	Econoline Crush
November 19, 1998	Washington, D.C.	United States	MCI Center	Econoline Crush
November 21, 1998	Philadelphia	United States	First Union Center	Econoline Crush
November 22, 1998	East Rutherford	United States	Continental Airlines Arena	Ozone Monday
November 23, 1998	New York City	United States	Madison Square Garden	Econoline Crush
November 25, 1998	Hartford	United States	Hartford Civic Center	Econoline Crush
November 27, 1998	Uniondale	United States	Nassau Veterans Memorial Coliseum	Econoline Crush
November 28, 1998	Rochester	United States	Blue Cross Arena	Econoline Crush
November 29, 1998	Buffalo	United States	Marine Midland Arena	Econoline Crush
December 1, 1998	Montreal	Canada	Molson Centre	Econoline Crush
December 2, 1998	Toronto	Canada	SkyDome	Econoline Crush
December 4, 1998	Pittsburgh	United States	Pittsburgh Civic Arena	Econoline Crush
December 5, 1998	Columbus	United States	Schottenstein Center	Econoline Crush
December 6, 1998	Cleveland	United States	Gund Arena	Econoline Crush
December 8, 1998	Charleston	United States	Charleston Civic Center	Econoline Crush
December 9, 1998	Lexington	United States	Rupp Arena	Econoline Crush
December 11, 1998	Fairborn	United States	Ervin J. Nutter Center	Econoline Crush
December 12, 1998	Terre Haute	United States	Hulman Center^{2}	Econoline Crush
December 13, 1998	Indianapolis	United States	Market Square Arena^{2}	Econoline Crush
December 15, 1998	Minneapolis	United States	Target Center	Econoline Crush
December 16, 1998	Omaha	United States	Omaha Civic Auditorium	Econoline Crush
December 18, 1998	Rockford	United States	Rockford MetroCentre	Econoline Crush
December 19, 1998	Cedar Rapids	United States	Five Seasons Center	Econoline Crush
December 20, 1998	Milwaukee	United States	Bradley Center	Econoline Crush
December 27, 1998	Madison	United States	Dane County Expo Coliseum	Caroline's Spine
December 29, 1998	Rosemont	United States	Rosemont Horizon	Caroline's Spine
December 30, 1998	Grand Rapids	United States	Van Andel Arena	Caroline's Spine
December 31, 1998	Auburn Hills	United States	The Palace of Auburn Hills	Caroline's Spine
January 2, 1999	Nashville	United States	Nashville Arena	Ozone Monday
January 31, 1999	Miami Gardens	United States	Pro Player Stadium (Super Bowl XXXIII)	—N/a
Europe
February 26, 1999	Helsinki	Finland	Hartwall Areena	Buckcherry
February 28, 1999	Oslo	Norway	Oslo Spektrum	Buckcherry
March 2, 1999	Stockholm	Sweden	Globen Arena	Buckcherry
March 3, 1999	Stockholm	Sweden	Globen Arena	Buckcherry
March 4, 1999	Gothenburg	Sweden	Scandinavium	Buckcherry
March 5, 1999	Gothenburg	Sweden	Scandinavium	Buckcherry
March 7, 1999	Berlin	Germany	Velodrom	Buckcherry
March 8, 1999	Cologne	Germany	Kölnarena	Buckcherry
March 9, 1999	Frankfurt	Germany	Festhalle Frankfurt	Buckcherry
March 11, 1999	Erfurt	Germany	Messehalle	Buckcherry
March 12, 1999	Bremen	Germany	Bremen Stadthalle^{3}	Buckcherry
March 13, 1999	Utrecht	Netherlands	Prins van Oranjehal	Buckcherry
March 15, 1999	Milan	Italy	Filaforum	Buckcherry
March 17, 1999	Vienna	Austria	Wiener Stadthalle	Buckcherry
March 18, 1999	Prague	Czech Republic	Sportovní hala	Buckcherry
March 19, 1999	Munich	Germany	Olympiahalle	Buckcherry
March 20, 1999	Stuttgart	Germany	Hanns-Martin-Schleyer-Halle	Buckcherry
March 22, 1999	Paris	France	Palais Omnisports de Paris-Bercy	Buckcherry
March 23, 1999	Brussels	Belgium	Forest National	Buckcherry
March 25, 1999	London	England	Wembley Arena	Buckcherry
March 27, 1999	Dortmund	Germany	Westfalenhalle	Justice
March 28, 1999	Kiel	Germany	Ostseehalle	Natural Born Hippies
Latin America
April 10, 1999	Buenos Aires	Argentina	River Plate Stadium	Rammstein
April 15, 1999	Porto Alegre	Brazil	Hipódromo do Cristal	Rammstein
April 17, 1999	São Paulo	Brazil	Autódromo de Interlagos	Rammstein
April 21, 1999	San Juan	Puerto Rico	Roberto Clemente Coliseum	Puya
April 24, 1999	Mexico City	Mexico	Foro Sol	Rammstein

- ^Note 1The first show of the tour was broadcast on Fox TV's Halloween special and on the radio.
- ^Note 2These shows were recorded and released as a live bonus EP, which was in support of the European leg.
- ^Note 3Kiss was banned from performing from the venue, after setting off the pyrotechnics despite the warnings of the local fire marshal.

=== Postponed and cancelled dates ===
Date	City	Country	Venue	Reasoning
January 29, 1999	Fort Lauderdale, Florida	United States	National Car Rental Center	Poor ticket sales due to the Super Bowl
March 1, 1999	Copenhagen	Denmark	Forum Copenhagen	Low ticket sales / added dates in Sweden which would have forced the band to play 6 days in a row
April 1, 1999	Moscow	Russia	Olimpiyskiy	Russian political and security issues
April 2, 1999	Moscow	Russia	Olimpiyskiy	Russian political and security issues
April 4, 1999	St. Petersburg	Russia	SKK Peterburgskiy	Russian political and security issues
April 13, 1999	Santiago	Chile	Velódromo del Estadio Nacional	Logistical issues

=== Box office score data ===
List of box office score data with date, city, venue, attendance, gross, references
Date	City	Venue	Attendance	Gross	Ref(s)
November 21, 1998	Philadelphia	First Union Center	12,927 / 15,690	$566,130	
November 22, 1998	East Rutherford	Continental Airlines Arena	14,858 / 14,858	$748,945	
November 23, 1998	New York City	Madison Square Garden	15,173 / 15,173	$797,900	
November 25, 1998	Hartford	Civic Center	7,715 / 11,809	$300,820	
November 27, 1998	Uniondale	Nassau Veterans Memorial Coliseum	12,773 / 14,007	$626,730	
December 11, 1998	Fairborn	Ervin J. Nutter Center	8,877 / 11,754	$337,457	
December 31, 1998	Auburn Hills	The Palace of Auburn Hills	14,431 / 14,431	$936,625	

== Personnel ==
- Paul Stanley – vocals, rhythm guitar
- Gene Simmons – vocals, bass
- Peter Criss – drums, vocals
- Ace Frehley – lead guitar, vocals
