= Psycho Circus (disambiguation) =

Psycho Circus may refer to:

- Psycho Circus, a 1998 album by the American hard rock/heavy metal band Kiss
  - "Psycho Circus" (song), a track on this album
- Kiss: Psycho Circus, a comics title published by Image comics from 1997 to 2000
- Kiss: Psycho Circus: The Nightmare Child, a first person shooter computer game developed by Third Law Interactive
- Los Psycho Circus, a Mexican wrestling group
- The American title of the 1966 film Circus of Fear
