= Kiss Farewell Tour =

2000–2001 concert tour by Kiss

The Farewell Tour
- Tour by Kiss
- Poster with the Australian tour dates
- Start date: March 11, 2000
- End date: April 13, 2001
- Legs: 5
- No. of shows: 142

Kiss concert chronology
- Psycho Circus World Tour (1998–1999); The Farewell Tour (2000–2001); World Domination Tour (2003)

The Farewell Tour was a concert tour performed by the American rock band Kiss. It started on March 11, 2000, and concluded on April 13, 2001. It was the last tour to feature original member Ace Frehley.

== Background ==
It was intended to be Kiss' last tour, however, in late 2002 they announced that they were not going to retire as planned. Although Kiss continued performing after the conclusion of the tour, this was the final tour with the original, reunited lineup. Paul Stanley later revealed the tour was an attempt to "put Kiss out of its misery" following the legal troubles during production of Psycho Circus, and the reunited band having underwhelming live performances and "being virtually prisoners to doing the same songs every tour." The tour began on March 11, 2000, in Phoenix, Arizona at the Blockbuster Desert Sky Pavilion.

During the show in Irvine, California, Frehley had missed his flight and ended up having to fly via helicopter to the show, where the band's then-tour manager Tommy Thayer was dressed in his makeup, ready to fill in for him.

Peter Criss had effectively left the band following the final show in North Charleston, in October 2000; however, this was not publicly known at the time. His reunion contract had essentially expired and he and Kiss were unable to come to terms for him continuing with the band, resulting in Criss destroying his drum set out of frustration at the end of the show. He was replaced by Eric Singer for the Japan and Australian legs. Frehley left the band following the farewell tour, intending to focus on his solo career.

In the tour program for the band's final tour, Stanley reflected on the tour:

The Reunion tour made us the number one band again. We played to about two million people in one year. Then we did the Psycho Circus tour and after that we thought, "been there, done it." We're the champs again, let's retire on top and we felt there is nothing worse than having someone go away and you don't get to say goodbye so this tour really is for the fans and to celebrate the whole history of the band.

== Set lists ==
=== North American set list ===
1. "Detroit Rock City"
2. "Deuce"
3. "Shout It Out Loud"
4. "I Love It Loud"
5. "Shock Me"
6. "Firehouse"
7. "Do You Love Me"
8. "Calling Dr. Love"
9. "Heaven's on Fire"
10. "Let Me Go, Rock 'n' Roll"
11. "2,000 Man"
12. "Psycho Circus"
13. "Lick It Up"
14. "God of Thunder"
15. "Cold Gin"
16. "100,000 Years"
17. "Love Gun"
18. "I Still Love You" (performed by Paul Stanley)
19. "Black Diamond"

Encore

20. "Beth"
21. "Rock and Roll All Nite"

=== Japanese and Australian set list ===
1. "Detroit Rock City"
2. "Deuce"
3. "Shout It Out Loud"
4. "Talk to Me"
5. "I Love It Loud"
6. "Firehouse"
7. "Do You Love Me"
8. "Calling Dr. Love"
9. "Heaven's on Fire"
10. "Let Me Go, Rock 'n' Roll"
11. "Shock Me"
12. "Psycho Circus"
13. "Lick It Up"
14. "God of Thunder"
15. "Cold Gin"
16. "100,000 Years"
17. "Love Gun"
18. "I Still Love You" (performed by Paul Stanley)
19. "Black Diamond"

Encore

20. "I Was Made for Lovin' You"
21. "Rock and Roll All Nite"

== Tour dates ==
List of concerts, showing date, city, country, venue, and opening acts
Date	City	Country	Venue	Opening Act(s)
North America
March 11, 2000	Phoenix	United States	Blockbuster Desert Sky Pavilion^{1}	Ted Nugent
March 12, 2000	Tucson	United States	Tucson Convention Center	Ted Nugent
March 14, 2000	Las Cruces	United States	Pan American Center	Ted Nugent; Skid Row
March 17, 2000	Paradise	United States	Mandalay Bay Events Center	Ted Nugent; Skid Row
March 18, 2000	Anaheim	United States	Arrowhead Pond of Anaheim^{2}	Ted Nugent; Skid Row
March 19, 2000	San Diego	United States	San Diego Sports Arena	Ted Nugent; Skid Row
March 21, 2000	Bakersfield	United States	Bakersfield Centennial Garden	Ted Nugent; Skid Row
March 23, 2000	Oakland	United States	The Arena in Oakland	Ted Nugent; Skid Row
March 25, 2000	Reno	United States	Lawlor Events Center	Ted Nugent; Skid Row
March 27, 2000	West Valley City	United States	E Center	Ted Nugent; Skid Row
March 28, 2000	Denver	United States	Pepsi Center	Ted Nugent; Skid Row
March 29, 2000	Lubbock	United States	United Spirit Arena	Ted Nugent; Skid Row
March 31, 2000	San Antonio	United States	Alamodome	Ted Nugent; Skid Row
April 1, 2000	The Woodlands	United States	Cynthia Woods Mitchell Pavilion	Ted Nugent; Skid Row
April 2, 2000	Dallas	United States	Starplex Amphitheatre	Ted Nugent; Skid Row
April 4, 2000	Oklahoma City	United States	Myriad Convention Center	Ted Nugent; Skid Row
April 5, 2000	North Little Rock	United States	Alltel Arena	Ted Nugent; Skid Row
April 6, 2000	Pensacola	United States	Pensacola Civic Center	Ted Nugent; Skid Row
April 8, 2000	West Palm Beach	United States	Mars Music Amphitheater	Ted Nugent; Skid Row
April 9, 2000	Estero	United States	TECO Arena	Ted Nugent; Skid Row
April 11, 2000	Orlando	United States	TD Waterhouse Centre	Ted Nugent; Skid Row
April 12, 2000	Tampa	United States	Ice Palace	Ted Nugent; Skid Row
April 14, 2000	Birmingham	United States	BJCC Arena	Ted Nugent; Skid Row
April 15, 2000	Atlanta	United States	Philips Arena	Ted Nugent; Skid Row
April 16, 2000	New Orleans	United States	New Orleans Arena	Ted Nugent; Skid Row
April 18, 2000	Columbia	United States	Carolina Coliseum	Ted Nugent; Skid Row
April 20, 2000	Charlotte	United States	Charlotte Coliseum	Ted Nugent; Skid Row
April 21, 2000	Greenville	United States	Bi-Lo Center	Ted Nugent; Skid Row
April 22, 2000	Greensboro	United States	Greensboro Coliseum	Ted Nugent; Skid Row
April 24, 2000	Chattanooga	United States	UTC Arena	Ted Nugent; Skid Row
April 25, 2000	Memphis	United States	Pyramid Arena	Ted Nugent; Skid Row
April 28, 2000	Nashville	United States	AmSouth Amphitheater	Ted Nugent; Skid Row
April 29, 2000	Louisville	United States	Freedom Hall	Ted Nugent; Skid Row
April 30, 2000	Knoxville	United States	Thompson–Boling Arena	Ted Nugent; Skid Row
May 2, 2000	Charleston	United States	Charleston Civic Center	Ted Nugent; Skid Row
May 3, 2000	Roanoke	United States	Roanoke Civic Center	Ted Nugent; Skid Row
May 5, 2000	Cleveland	United States	Gund Arena	Ted Nugent; Skid Row
May 6, 2000	Cleveland	United States	Gund Arena	Ted Nugent; Skid Row
May 7, 2000	Grand Rapids	United States	Van Andel Arena	Ted Nugent; Skid Row
May 9, 2000	Toledo	United States	John F. Savage Hall	Ted Nugent; Skid Row
May 11, 2000	Rosemont	United States	Allstate Arena	Ted Nugent; Skid Row
May 12, 2000	Rosemont	United States	Allstate Arena	Ted Nugent; Skid Row
May 13, 2000	Columbus	United States	Polaris Amphitheater	Ted Nugent; Skid Row
May 15, 2000	Peoria	United States	Peoria Civic Center	Ted Nugent; Skid Row
May 16, 2000	Moline	United States	MARK of the Quad Cities	Ted Nugent; Skid Row
May 18, 2000	Minneapolis	United States	Target Center	Ted Nugent; Skid Row
May 19, 2000	Milwaukee	United States	Marcus Amphitheatre	Ted Nugent; Skid Row
May 21, 2000	Noblesville	United States	Deer Creek Music Theater	Ted Nugent; Skid Row
May 22, 2000	Cincinnati	United States	Riverbend Music Center	Ted Nugent; Skid Row
May 24, 2000	Auburn Hills	United States	The Palace of Auburn Hills	Ted Nugent; Skid Row
May 25, 2000	Auburn Hills	United States	The Palace of Auburn Hills	Ted Nugent; Skid Row
May 26, 2000	Burgettstown	United States	Post-Gazette Pavilion	Ted Nugent; Skid Row
North America
June 6, 2000	Richmond	United States	Richmond Coliseum	Ted Nugent; Skid Row; Slash's Snake Pit
June 9, 2000	Wantagh	United States	Jones Beach Amphitheater	Ted Nugent; Skid Row; Slash's Snake Pit
June 10, 2000	Wantagh	United States	Jones Beach Amphitheater	Ted Nugent; Skid Row; Slash's Snake Pit
June 12, 2000	Mansfield	United States	Tweeter Center	Ted Nugent; Skid Row; Slash's Snake Pit
June 13, 2000	Mansfield	United States	Tweeter Center	Ted Nugent; Skid Row; Slash's Snake Pit
June 15, 2000	Portland	United States	Cumberland County Civic Center	Ted Nugent; Skid Row; Slash's Snake Pit
June 16, 2000	Camden	United States	Blockbuster Sony Entertainment Center	Ted Nugent; Skid Row; Slash's Snake Pit
June 19, 2000	Erie	United States	Erie Civic Center	Ted Nugent; Skid Row; Slash's Snake Pit
June 20, 2000	Saratoga Springs	United States	Saratoga Performing Arts Center	Ted Nugent; Skid Row; Slash's Snake Pit
June 22, 2000	Montreal	Canada	Molson Centre	Ted Nugent; Skid Row; Slash's Snake Pit
June 23, 2000	Toronto	Canada	Air Canada Centre	Ted Nugent; Skid Row; Slash's Snake Pit
June 24, 2000	Buffalo	United States	HSBC Arena	Ted Nugent; Skid Row; Slash's Snake Pit
June 27, 2000	East Rutherford	United States	Continental Airlines Arena	Ted Nugent; Skid Row; Slash's Snake Pit
June 28, 2000	East Rutherford	United States	Continental Airlines Arena	Ted Nugent; Skid Row; Slash's Snake Pit
June 30, 2000	Raleigh	United States	Alltel Pavilion at Walnut Creek	Ted Nugent; Skid Row; Slash's Snake Pit
July 1, 2000	Bristow	United States	Nissan Pavilion	Ted Nugent; Skid Row; Slash's Snake Pit
July 2, 2000	Virginia Beach	United States	GTE Virginia Beach Amphitheater	Ted Nugent; Skid Row; Slash's Snake Pit
July 5, 2000	Hershey	United States	Hersheypark Stadium	Ted Nugent; Skid Row; Slash's Snake Pit
July 7, 2000	Scranton	United States	Coors Light Amphitheatre	Ted Nugent; Skid Row; Slash's Snake Pit
July 8, 2000	Hartford	United States	Meadows Music Theater	Ted Nugent; Skid Row; Slash's Snake Pit
July 11, 2000	Madison	United States	Kohl Center	Ted Nugent; Skid Row; Slash's Snake Pit
July 13, 2000	Minneapolis	United States	Target Center	Ted Nugent; Skid Row; Slash's Snake Pit
July 14, 2000	Fargo	United States	Fargodome	Ted Nugent; Skid Row; Slash's Snake Pit
July 16, 2000	Winnipeg	Canada	Winnipeg Arena	Ted Nugent; Skid Row; Slash's Snake Pit
July 17, 2000	Saskatoon	Canada	Saskatchewan Place	Ted Nugent; Skid Row; Slash's Snake Pit
July 19, 2000	Calgary	Canada	Canadian Airlines Saddledome	Ted Nugent; Skid Row; Slash's Snake Pit
July 20, 2000	Edmonton	Canada	Skyreach Centre	Ted Nugent; Skid Row; Slash's Snake Pit
July 22, 2000	George	United States	The Gorge Amphitheatre	Ted Nugent; Skid Row; Slash's Snake Pit
July 24, 2000	Portland	United States	Rose Garden Arena	Ted Nugent; Skid Row; Slash's Snake Pit
July 26, 2000	Nampa	United States	Idaho Center	Ted Nugent; Skid Row; Slash's Snake Pit
July 28, 2000	Mountain View	United States	Shoreline Amphitheatre	Ted Nugent; American Pearl
July 29, 2000	Sacramento	United States	Sacramento Valley Amphitheatre	Ted Nugent; American Pearl
July 30, 2000	Concord	United States	Chronicle Pavilion	Neve; Ted Nugent
August 1, 2000	Fresno	United States	Selland Arena	Neve; Ted Nugent
August 2, 2000	Paradise	United States	Mandalay Bay Events Center	Neve; Ted Nugent
North America
August 11, 2000	Irvine	United States	Irvine Meadows Amphitheatre^{3}	Ted Nugent; Skid Row
August 12, 2000	San Bernardino	United States	Blockbuster Pavilion	Ted Nugent; Skid Row
August 14, 2000	Greenwood Village	United States	Fiddler's Green Amphitheater	Ted Nugent; Skid Row
August 15, 2000	Albuquerque	United States	Tingley Coliseum	Ted Nugent; Skid Row
August 17, 2000	Austin	United States	Frank Erwin Center	Ted Nugent; Skid Row
August 18, 2000	Lafayette	United States	Cajundome	Ted Nugent; Skid Row
August 19, 2000	Jackson	United States	Mississippi Coliseum	Ted Nugent; Skid Row
August 21, 2000	Biloxi	United States	Mississippi Coast Coliseum	Ted Nugent; Skid Row
August 22, 2000	The Woodlands	United States	Cynthia Woods Mitchell Pavilion	Skid Row; Beautiful Creatures
August 23, 2000	Fort Worth	United States	Fort Worth Convention Center	Ted Nugent; Skid Row
August 25, 2000	Bonner Springs	United States	Sandstone Amphitheater^{4}	Ted Nugent; Skid Row
August 26, 2000	Maryland Heights	United States	Riverport Amphitheatre	Ted Nugent; Skid Row
August 28, 2000	Valley Center	United States	Kansas Coliseum	Ted Nugent; Skid Row
August 29, 2000	Omaha	United States	Omaha Civic Auditorium	Ted Nugent; Skid Row
August 30, 2000	Ames	United States	Hilton Coliseum	Ted Nugent; Skid Row
September 1, 2000	Carbondale	United States	SIU Arena	Ted Nugent; Skid Row
September 2, 2000	Cedar Rapids	United States	Five Seasons Center	Ted Nugent; Skid Row
September 5, 2000	Rockford	United States	Rockford MetroCentre	Ted Nugent; Skid Row
September 6, 2000	East Lansing	United States	Breslin Center	Skid Row; Beautiful Creatures
September 8, 2000	Lexington	United States	Rupp Arena	Ted Nugent; Skid Row
September 9, 2000	Indianapolis	United States	Conseco Fieldhouse	Ted Nugent; Skid Row
September 10, 2000	Evansville	United States	Roberts Municipal Stadium	Ted Nugent; Skid Row
September 12, 2000	Clarkston	United States	Pine Knob Music Theatre	Skid Row; Beautiful Creatures
September 13, 2000	Dayton	United States	Ervin J. Nutter Center	Ted Nugent; Skid Row
September 15, 2000	Binghamton	United States	Broome County Veterans Memorial Arena	Ted Nugent; Skid Row
September 16, 2000	Syracuse	United States	Onondaga County War Memorial	Ted Nugent; Skid Row
September 18, 2000	Providence	United States	Providence Civic Center^{5}	Ted Nugent; Skid Row
September 20, 2000	Quebec City	Canada	Colisée de Québec	Skid Row; Serial Joe
September 21, 2000	Ottawa	Canada	Corel Centre	Skid Row; Serial Joe
September 23, 2000	Hamilton	Canada	Copps Coliseum	Skid Row; Serial Joe
September 26, 2000	Trenton	United States	Sovereign Bank Arena	Skid Row
September 27, 2000	University Park	United States	Bryce Jordan Center	Skid Row
September 29, 2000	Columbus	United States	Nationwide Arena	Skid Row
September 30, 2000	Tinley Park	United States	New World Music Theatre	Skid Row
October 1, 2000	Champaign	United States	Assembly Hall	Skid Row
October 3, 2000	Uncasville	United States	Uncas Pavilion at Mohegan Sun	Skid Row
October 4, 2000	Columbia	United States	Merriweather Post Pavilion	Skid Row; Brickfoot
October 6, 2000	Charlotte	United States	Charlotte Coliseum	Skid Row
October 7, 2000	North Charleston	United States	North Charleston Coliseum^{6}	Skid Row
Japan
March 9, 2001	Yokohama	Japan	Yokohama Arena^{7}	—N/a
March 10, 2001	Yokohama	Japan	Yokohama Arena^{7}	—N/a
March 13, 2001	Tokyo	Japan	Tokyo Dome	—N/a
March 16, 2001	Fukuoka	Japan	Kokusai Center	—N/a
March 18, 2001	Nagoya	Japan	Nagoya Rainbow Hall	—N/a
March 21, 2001	Osaka	Japan	Osaka-jō Hall	—N/a
March 22, 2001	Osaka	Japan	Osaka-jō Hall	—N/a
Australia
March 29, 2001	Perth	Australia	Burswood Dome	The Screaming Jets
April 1, 2001	Adelaide	Australia	Adelaide Entertainment Centre	The Screaming Jets
April 3, 2001	Melbourne	Australia	Rod Laver Arena	The Screaming Jets
April 4, 2001	Melbourne	Australia	Rod Laver Arena	The Screaming Jets
April 5, 2001	Melbourne	Australia	Rod Laver Arena	The Screaming Jets
April 7, 2001	Sydney	Australia	Sydney Super Dome	The Screaming Jets
April 8, 2001	Sydney	Australia	Sydney Super Dome	The Screaming Jets
April 13, 2001	Gold Coast	Australia	Carrara Stadium^{8}	The Screaming Jets

- ^Note 1The band rehearsed at this venue several days before their debut show.
- ^Note 2This show was troubled by major production errors. During the opening to the song "Love Gun" each night, Paul Stanley would ride on wire with foot sling to a small second stage in the arena floor where he performed the song. At this show, he became stalled a few rows out from the main stage and hung over the audience, helpless for quite a while before the road crew were able to reverse the wire and edge him back to the main stage. Many other errors occurred as well.
- ^Note 3Ace Frehley was so late arriving to this show, the band was preparing to dress up Tommy Thayer to fill in. Frehley traveled by helicopter to make it.
- ^Note 4The band and manager Doc McGhee presented Gene Simmons with a surprise, a giant birthday cake in the shape of a woman's breasts. He turned 51 that day.
- ^Note 5Peter Criss had added a tear to his facepaint to signal his dissatisfaction with the band. He left the stage before the band took its group bow, so only Stanley, Simmons and Frehley joined hands and bowed.
- ^Note 6After failed contract negotiations over what he was being paid, Criss destroyed his drum kit at the show's conclusion in frustration, Criss' last show with Kiss until 2003.
- ^Note 7Eric Singer's first show, after a five-year absence. Donned Catman makeup and outfit for the very first time.
- ^Note 8Ace Frehley's last show.

=== Postponed and cancelled dates ===
Date	City	Country	Venue	Reason
May 17, 2000	Minneapolis	United States	Target Center	The band was unable to fly out of Chicago due to poor weather conditions, rescheduled to May 18
September 24, 2000	Lake Placid	United States	Olympic Center	Poor ticket sales
November 13, 2000	Hiroshima	Japan	Sun Plaza Hall	Cancelled due to ongoing contract issues with Peter Criss, all dates except Hiroshima rescheduled to March 2001
November 15, 2000	Osaka	Japan	Osaka Castle Hall	Cancelled due to ongoing contract issues with Peter Criss, all dates except Hiroshima rescheduled to March 2001
November 16, 2000	Osaka	Japan	Osaka Castle Hall	Cancelled due to ongoing contract issues with Peter Criss, all dates except Hiroshima rescheduled to March 2001
November 17, 2000	Nagoya	Japan	Nagoya Rainbow Hall	Cancelled due to ongoing contract issues with Peter Criss, all dates except Hiroshima rescheduled to March 2001
November 19, 2000	Tokyo	Japan	Tokyo Dome	Cancelled due to ongoing contract issues with Peter Criss, all dates except Hiroshima rescheduled to March 2001
November 20, 2000	Yokohama	Japan	Yokohama Arena	Cancelled due to ongoing contract issues with Peter Criss, all dates except Hiroshima rescheduled to March 2001
April 1, 2001	Adelaide	Australia	Hindmarsh Stadium	Due to soccer match between Adelaide and Marconi at the stadium on March 30

=== Box office score data ===
List of box office score data with date, city, venue, attendance, gross, references
Date (2000)	City	Venue	Attendance	Gross	Ref(s)
March 18	Anaheim, United States	Arrowhead Pond	14,009 / 14,009	$826,365	
March 23	Oakland, United States	Oakland-Alameda County Arena	14,494 / 15,885	$860,759	
March 25	Reno, United States	Lawlor Events Center	9,935 / 10,465	$408,340	
March 31	San Antonio, United States	Alamodome	20,760 / 20,760	$908,025	
April 29	Louisville, United States	Freedom Hall	14,467 / 14,868	$689,265	
May 2	Charleston, United States	Civic Center	7,711 / 10,000	$361,745	
May 5–6	Cleveland, United States	Gund Arena	26,698 / 35,000	$1,685,210	
May 7	Grand Rapids, United States	Van Andel Arena	11,791 / 12,420	$621,589	
May 15	Peoria, United States	Civic Center	9,130 / 9,130	$419,795	
May 19	Milwaukee, United States	Marcus Amphitheatre	17,172 / 22,828	$670,177	
May 20	Noblesville, United States	Deer Creek Music Center	22,633 / 24,210	$1,030,697	
May 22	Cincinnati, United States	Riverbend Music Center	11,209 / 20,474	$500,750	
May 24–25	Auburn Hills, United States	Palace	27,493 / 27,493	$1,728,300	
May 26	Burgettstown, United States	Post-Gazette Pavilion	14,946 / 23,212	$614,934	
June 9–10	Wantagh, United States	Jones Beach Theatre	23,542 / 28,200	$1,292,865	
June 27–28	East Rutherford, United States	Continental Airlines Arena	27,910 / 30,000	$1,565,100	
July 5	Hershey, United States	Hersheypark Arena	18,232 / 28,824	$844,177	
July 22	George, United States	The Gorge	17,676 / 20,000	$955,339	

== Personnel ==
- Paul Stanley – vocals, rhythm guitar
- Gene Simmons – vocals, bass
- Peter Criss – drums, vocals (North American legs)
- Ace Frehley – lead guitar, vocals

Additional musicians

- Eric Singer – drums, vocals (Japan and Australia legs)
- Tommy Thayer – lead guitar, vocals
