= Psycho Circus =

Studio album by Kiss
- Released: September 22, 1998
- Recorded: January–April 1998
- Studios: One on One (Los Angeles); A&M (Hollywood, California)
- Genres: Hard rock; heavy metal
- Length: 44:24
- Label: Mercury
- Producer: Bruce Fairbairn

Kiss chronology
Carnival of Souls (1997)	Psycho Circus (1998)	The Very Best of Kiss (2002)

Singles from Psycho Circus
- 1. "Psycho Circus" Released: August 1998; 2. "We Are One" Released: 1998; 3. "I Finally Found My Way" Released: 1998; 4. "You Wanted the Best" Released: November 23, 1998

Psycho Circus is the eighteenth studio album by American rock band Kiss, released on 22 September 1998 by Mercury Records as the band's final album on the label. It is also their first and only album to involve all four original members since 1979's Dynasty. While touted as a band effort, the album was recorded using largely session players and Kiss associates. Peter Criss only played drums on the Ace Frehley-penned track, "Into the Void", and guitarist Frehley only played on two regular album tracks, the one he wrote plus "You Wanted the Best". He also played on a bonus track called "In Your Face", penned by Simmons. All four band members, however, sang lead vocals on the album.

== Background ==
Following the highly successful 1996–97 reunion tour, Psycho Circus was marketed as the first new studio album by the band's original lineup since 1979's Dynasty (as Peter Criss did not participate on the 1980s Unmasked, although Criss' drum work is limited to only one of the eleven songs on Psycho Circus). As with Dynasty and Unmasked, however, many of the songs were recorded by uncredited players.

== Composition and recording ==
Ace Frehley and Criss' contribution was used sparingly in the production of the album, with Criss playing drums only on "Into the Void". Criss stated in his book Makeup to Breakup: My Life in and Out of Kiss that Paul Stanley was so determined not to work with him and Frehley in the studio that they were paid $850,000 each not to participate in the recording.

In 2011, in Frehley's book No Regrets, he says that he wrote a lot of songs for the album, one of those songs being titled "Life, Liberty, and the Pursuit of Rock 'n' Roll". He mentions that the title and lyrics of the song were deemed very similar to the song "I Pledge Allegiance to the State of Rock 'n' Roll". Frehley would record the song under the title "Pursuit of Rock and Roll" for his 2018 solo album Spaceman.

Frehley's "Into the Void" was co-written with Karl Cochran and originally titled "Shakin' Sharp Shooter", but Gene Simmons and Stanley were unhappy with the lyrics and title. Frehley then went up to a separate room and rewrote the lyrics to his song in 30 minutes. Despite Simmons claiming he and Stanley needed to provide substantial help arranging the song, Cochran stated, "as far as the basic song structure, almost nothing was changed from what Ace and I wrote. I have the original demos that were cut in Ace's studio, and basically, it's the same song. Ace just changed the title of the song after the demo was done, which Gene had mentioned to him". Even with the changes the song very nearly did not happen for the album with producer Bruce Fairbairn being unsure that Frehley could get the song fixed in time to record it the next day. He was still finishing the final verse in the studio as the recording commenced. Once recorded, Frehley was unhappy with the mix and insisted on remixing the track himself to make the song more raw, with the guitars and drums higher in the mix.

The song "Within" was originally written and demoed for Kiss's previous album Carnival of Souls: The Final Sessions and contains the original backwards guitar intro from the demo by previous Kiss member Bruce Kulick.

Bruce Fairbairn was brought in to produce the album, and stated that he wanted to stay away from gimmicks and trends such as guest appearances, just "tried to stay true to what Kiss does best and people remember them for." The album was mostly recorded at Los Angeles's A&M Studios and One on One Recording Studios, with the performances being first recorded with analogue equipment, and then digitized for mixing and overdubs. Afterwards, it was mixed by Mick Guzauski in his New York studio, and mastered by Fairbairn and Kiss' longtime partner George Marino at Sterling Sound, New York. Fairbairn complimented the band for being collaborative, declaring that "it had the potential to be a nightmare because they're all disparate and strong characters, musically and as people."

In a radio interview with Eddie Trunk following his departure, Criss stated that only "Into the Void" featured instrumental contributions from all four members. Regarding the lack of cohesion in the group at the time of recording, Stanley stated, "We tried to do a Kiss album, and it was an ill-fated attempt because there was no real band," and continued by adding, "For a band to make a great album, it has to share a common purpose...and we didn't have it." In 2014, Stanley changed stories yet again, claiming that Criss and Frehley were trying to renegotiate deals and get to compose more songs when he and Simmons thought that "Why would they be equal partners? The band had existed [for many years without them]." There were also stories that the producer didn't think Ace and Peter were good enough players to contribute to the album, despite them being apparently good enough for some songs.Although the subsequent Kiss Farewell Tour was meant to "put Kiss out of its misery", Stanley eventually decided to continue playing because "I don't want Psycho Circus to be our last album. It's not a good memory."

"You Wanted the Best" is the only Kiss song in which lead vocals are shared by the entire lineup.

== Release ==
Some pressings featured a lenticular cover that alternates between a black Kiss logo and the album title with pictures of a clown and the band members, while the Japan initial first pressing featured a pop-up cover which had three foam spring-loaded panels of a clown face and two others with band members faces that popped out when the doors were opened.

It is sometimes assumed that Psycho Circus is based on the comic-book series Kiss: Psycho Circus, which debuted the year before the album was released; however, while it is true that the album had not been conceived at the time the comic book was first published, Simmons claims that the Psycho Circus concept was originally created as a Kiss tour theme.

== Reception ==
Professional ratings
Review scores
Source	Rating
AllMusic	2/5 stars
Collector's Guide to Heavy Metal	4/10
Encyclopedia of Popular Music	3/5 stars
Entertainment Weekly	A−
Kerrang!	3/5 stars
Metal Rules	4.0/5
Now	3/5 Ns
Rock Hard	8.0/10
Rolling Stone	3/5 stars
The Rolling Stone Album Guide	1/5 stars

Psycho Circus debuted at No. 3 on the Billboard 200, selling 110,000 copies in its first week of release, and was certified gold by the RIAA on October 22, 1998.

Contemporary critical reactions were mixed. Rolling Stone reviewer wrote that Psycho Circus is "an album of platform-stomping rhythms, roller-coaster guitar riffs and sing-along choruses — is far more respectable than any of the awkward flops from the no-makeup years." The Rolling Stone Album Guide was less positive, giving the album their lowest rating. Matt Diehl, in his review for Entertainment Weekly stated that "this is rock with a capital R, captured in all its cheesy glory... This new effort proves that in the circus of hard-rock dinosaurs, Kiss remains its Barnum & Bailey." "Well up to the band's usual standards of corny hoopla," wrote Clark Collis in The Daily Telegraph. "Typical of the beast is 'I Pledge Allegiance to the State of Rock & Roll' — three and a half minutes of hilariously bombastic pomp-rock that simply crushes thoughts of all post-glam musical developments beneath a silver-painted stack-heel boot." Metal Rules reviewer wrote that "Psycho Circus sounds so much like the KISS of old that you’d almost think the release date was 1979" and the song "'Psycho Circus' is the best arena-rock anthem KISS have put their names to since "Love Gun".

Modern reviews are less positive. AllMusic's Stephen Thomas Erlewine called the album's music "sleazy, big, dumb pop-metal", played by a band which "no longer sound young, hungry, or sleazy -- they sound like professional dirty old men." Canadian journalist Martin Popoff defined Psycho Circus "a sick, sick joke", containing "a couple of songs that will sound OK live... with about half hour of miserable filler".

=== Accolades ===
The album was voted Album of the Year in the 1998 Metal Edge Readers' Choice Awards, while the title track won Song of the Year and Best Video Clip.

=== Plagiarism ===
The song "Dreamin'" bears some resemblance to Alice Cooper's 1970 hit "I'm Eighteen". A month after the release of Psycho Circus, Cooper's publisher filed a plagiarism suit, which was settled out of court in Cooper's favor.

The hip hop duo Insane Clown Posse took issue with the album, feeling it copied their style, particularly their Dark Carnival mythology. Violent J, a member of Insane Clown Posse, referenced this in their song "Everybody Rize" with the line 'Fuck Gene Simmons you make me sick, psycho circus you stole my shit! Spit your blood out and do your dance but I'ma kick that ass through your leather pants.'

== Track listings ==
No.	Title	Writer(s)	Lead vocals	Length
1.	"Psycho Circus"	Paul Stanley, Curtis Cuomo	Stanley	5:30
2.	"Within"	Gene Simmons	Simmons	5:10
3.	"I Pledge Allegiance to the State of Rock & Roll"	Stanley, Cuomo, Holly Knight	Stanley	3:32
4.	"Into the Void"	Ace Frehley, Karl Cochran	Frehley	4:22
5.	"We Are One"	Simmons	Simmons	4:41
6.	"You Wanted the Best"	Simmons	Simmons, Stanley, Peter Criss, Frehley	4:15
7.	"Raise Your Glasses"	Stanley, Knight	Stanley	4:14
8.	"I Finally Found My Way"	Stanley, Bob Ezrin	Criss	3:40
9.	"Dreamin'"	Stanley, Bruce Kulick	Stanley	4:12
10.	"Journey of 1,000 Years"	Simmons	Simmons	4:47
Total length:				44:24

Japanese Edition bonus track
No.	Title	Writer(s)	Lead vocals	Length
11.	"In Your Face"	Simmons	Frehley	3:35

Limited Edition bonus disc
No.	Title	Writer(s)	Lead vocals	Length
1.	"Psycho Circus" (live)	Stanley, Cuomo	Stanley	5:34
2.	"Let Me Go, Rock 'n' Roll" (live)	Stanley, Simmons	Simmons	5:33
3.	"Into the Void" (live)	Frehley, Karl Cochran	Frehley	9:10
4.	"Within" (live)	Simmons	Simmons	7:57
5.	"100,000 Years" (live)	Stanley, Simmons	Stanley	5:17
6.	"Black Diamond" (live)	Stanley	Criss, intro by Stanley	6:12

== Personnel ==
Kiss

- Paul Stanley – vocals, rhythm guitar, bass and additional solos on track 3, acoustic guitar on tracks 5, 8 and 10
- Gene Simmons – vocals, bass on tracks 2, 4, 6, 10 and 11, rhythm guitar on track 5
- Ace Frehley – vocals and lead guitar on tracks 4, 6, and 11
- Peter Criss – vocals on tracks 6 and 8, drums on track 4

Additional musicians

- Kevin Valentine – drums (except track 4)
- Tommy Thayer – lead guitar on tracks 1, 3, 5, 8 and 10; bass on track 5
- Bruce Kulick – bass on tracks 1, 7, 8 & 9; lead guitar on tracks 2, 7; all guitars on track 9
- Shelly Berg – acoustic piano, orchestration and conductor on tracks 8 and 10
- Bob Ezrin – Fender Rhodes on track 8

Production

- Bruce Fairbairn – producer
- Mike Plotnikoff – engineer
- Jason Mauva – second engineer
- Quentin Dunn, Scott Camarota – assistant engineers
- Tom Halm (credited as Tom Halen) – copyist for tracks 8 and 10
- Mick Guzauski – mixing
- George Marino – mastering at Sterling Sound, New York

== Charts ==
Chart (1998)	Peak position
Australian Albums (ARIA)	1
Austrian Albums (Ö3 Austria)	25
Canada Top Albums/CDs (RPM)	3
Dutch Albums (Album Top 100)	51
European Albums Charts	13
Finnish Albums (Suomen virallinen lista)	5
French Albums (SNEP)	71
German Albums (Offizielle Top 100)	5
Japanese Albums (Oricon)	20
Norwegian Albums (VG-lista)	4
Scottish Albums (Official Charts)	61
Swedish Albums (Sverigetopplistan)	1
Swiss Albums (Schweizer Hitparade)	30
UK Albums (Official Charts)	47
UK Rock & Metal Albums (Official Charts)	2
US Billboard 200	3

== Certifications ==
Region	Certification	Certified units/sales
Canada (Music Canada)	Gold	50,000^{^}
Sweden (GLF)	Gold	40,000^{^}
United States (RIAA)	Gold	500,000^{^}
^{^} Shipments figures based on certification alone.
