= Román Fresnedo Siri =

Uruguayan architect (1903–1975)

Roman Fresnedo Siri
- Born: Roman Fresnedo Siri; February 4, 1903; Salto, Uruguay
- Died: June 26, 1975 (aged 72); Montevideo, Uruguay
- Education: University of the Republic
- Occupation: Architect

Román Fresnedo Siri (February 4, 1903 – June 26, 1975) was a Uruguayan architect. He is best known for designing major civic buildings throughout South America and the United States, including the Pan American Health Organization (PAHO) headquarters in Washington, D.C., and the Palacio de la Luz in Montevideo.

== Biography ==
=== Early life ===
Román Fresnedo Siri was born in 1903 in Salto, Uruguay, a small river city about 300 miles northwest of Montevideo on the border with Argentina. He left behind no autobiography or significant writings, so little is known of his early life. He spent his primary and secondary school years a few hundred miles upriver from Salto in Asunción, Paraguay. In 1920, he received certification in Paraguay as a surveyor—background that surely informed the deep integration of site, landscape and building that would inform his later architectural work. At the age of 20, Fresnedo Siri returned to Montevideo to pursue a degree in architecture.

=== Education (1923-1930) ===
Fresnedo Siri trained at Uruguay's University of the Republic in Montevideo between 1923 and 1930. The university's architecture school was then dominated by professor Joseph Paul Carré, a French architect who lived and taught in Uruguay from 1907 until his death in 1941. Carré had graduated in 1900 from the École des Beaux-Arts in Paris, influenced by the eclectic neo-classicism of the Paris school but also the emerging rationalist rejection of historicism and excessive ornamentation. Carré was not captive to any specific doctrine, in fact worrying that the new ideas could represent a stifling “new form of academism as troubling as the one that preceded it.” He believed that good architecture needed to combine functional imperatives with the emotion of art: “architecture, like the other arts, should adhere to the qualities of composition. Scale, contrasts, rhythm, proportion, the combinations of forms and volumes—all the qualities that define a work of art cannot be arbitrarily grouped; they must co-exist in intimate and harmonious relation. To do otherwise results in things of no artistic interest—rigid, cold, dead.” Fresnedo Siri seems to have absorbed a similar point of view, and throughout his career his projects evinced a keen attention to not only exterior and interior building design, but also to building systems, the site and landscape, furnishings and art. He was himself a multi-faceted artist, with avid interests ranging from painting, photography and music to boat and furniture design.

== Career ==
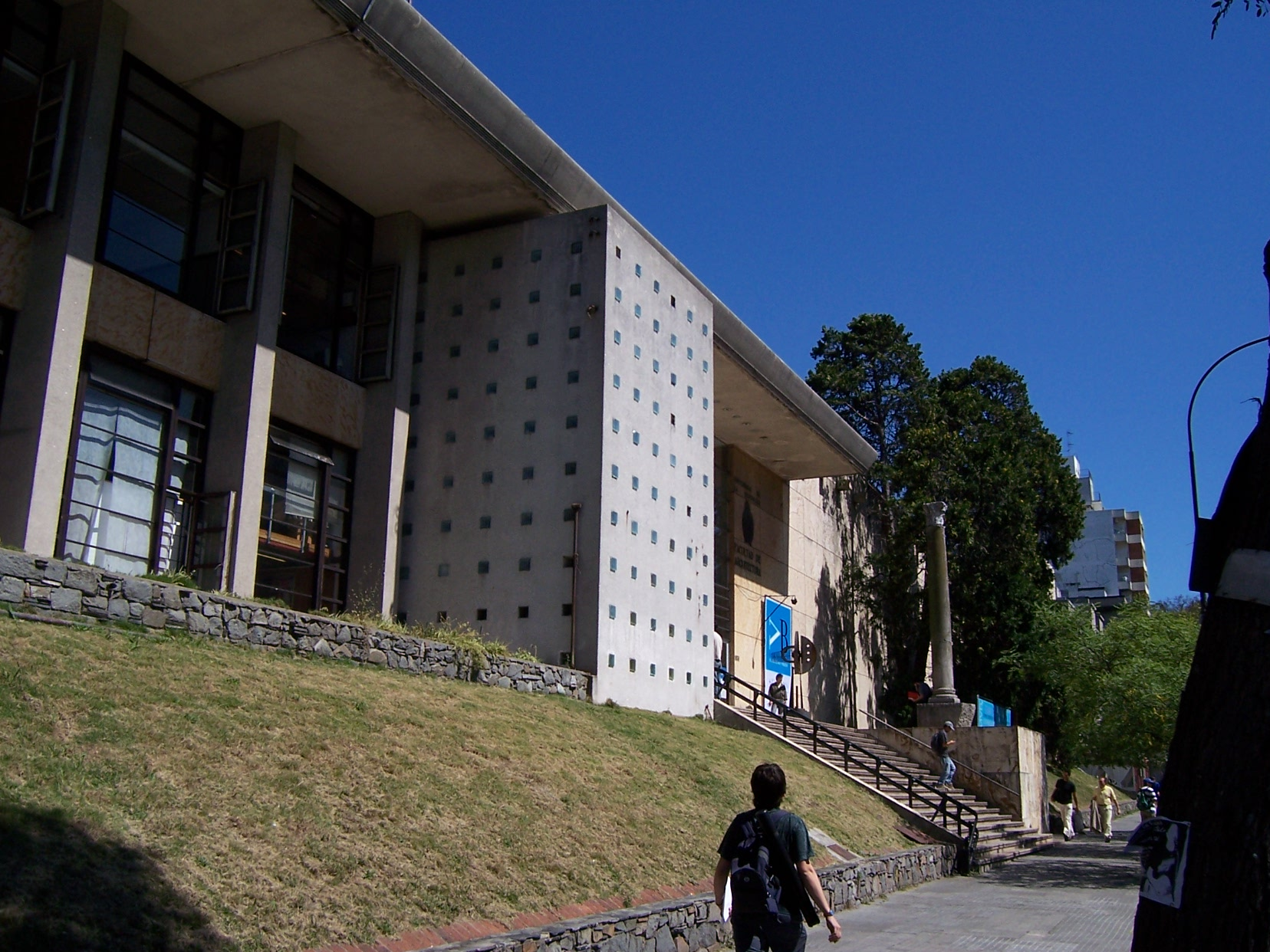
The School of Architecture building in Montevideo, designed by Fresnedo as his first major commission

Uruguay's architectural community closely followed emerging trends in Europe and the U.S. In his essay for the New York Museum of Modern Art (MOMA)’s catalogue for its 1955 exhibition “Latin American Architecture since 1945,” Henry-Russell Hitchcock described Montevideo's national university architecture faculty as “the most advanced in Latin America.” Amid these flourishing intellectual currents, Fresnedo Siri would have been impacted by the 1929 visit of famed modernist architect Le Corbusier to Montevideo. Modernist architectural ideas were fast moving from theory to implementation in the region, as Latin American governments backed ambitious expressions of the new ideas earlier than did their counterparts in Europe and elsewhere. An iconic early example of the movement was Brazil's Ministry of Education and Health building (1937), designed by Lucio Costa and Oscar Niemayer with Le Corbusier as consultant. A decade later, Niemayer and Julio Vilamajo of Uruguay (who had joined the architecture faculty in Montevideo during Fresnedo Siri's final year of study) would be the sole Latin American representatives on the design team for the United Nations headquarters building in New York. Another decade beyond that, Costa and Niemayer's design for Brazil's new capital city of Brasilia, now a UNESCO world heritage site often cited as an exemplar of modernist architecture, would be inaugurated just months before PAHO launched its design competition in Washington.

In 1938, together with fellow Uruguayan architect Mario Muccinelli, Fresnedo gained his first major commission by winning the competition to build a new complex for his alma mater's School of Architecture in Montevideo. The ambitious project spread over several city blocks and today stands alongside the early work of Costa and Niemayer as one of the important early examples of Latin American modernist architecture. The Government of Uruguay declared it a national historical monument in 2000. The graceful curve of its main faculty building would be echoed later in Fresnedo Siri's design for PAHO.

During his period of study in the 1920s, Fresnedo Siri was an enthusiast of Frank Lloyd Wright's work, embracing the ideas of “organic architecture”, or the harmonious integration of the built environment with its natural setting so that a building's design and placement, its furnishings and landscaping together comprised a unified whole. In 1940, New York's Museum of Modern Art (MOMA) sponsored a contest challenging designers from the United States and Latin America to submit furniture, lamps, and textiles of “Organic Design,” which curator Elliot Noyes described as a “harmonious organization of the parts within the whole, according to structure, material, and purpose... with no vain ornamentation or superfluity, but the part of beauty is none the less great in ideal choice of material, in visual refinement, and in the rational elegance of things intended for use.” Fresnedo Siri was one of the five Latin American winners for his design of chairs using Uruguayan leather and skins on a steel frame. Fresnedo Siri and the other winning designers had their work exhibited in the 1941 MOMA exhibition, Organic Design in Home Furnishings, and several were also awarded contracts for manufacture and distribution with major department stores. It was this landmark exhibition that introduced the world to Eero Saarinen and Charles Eames, who worked together as a team and won in both the chair design (the now-iconic Organic Chair) and living room categories.

Thanks to the MOMA's $1,000 prize and an invitation to its award event in New York, Fresnedo Siri was able to make his first trip to the U.S. in 1941. He was at the time serving as chief architect of Uruguay's national power and telephone utility company (UTE), which was developing plans to build a new company headquarters complex. He spent the next five months touring the country to study examples of modern office buildings. In addition to New York City, his stops included Boston, Chicago, San Francisco, and Washington, as well as the Cranbrook Academy of Art in Michigan—the first building designed in the U.S. by fellow modernist Eliel Saarinen.

Returning to Uruguay, Fresnedo Siri worked on the UTE project between 1942 and 1948. It entailed the development of what was essentially an entirely new “company town” in Montevideo's Arroyo Seco district, with worker housing and schools, retail spaces, company workshops, service centers and warehouses, a thermo-electric plant, and a company headquarters building. For the latter, he was inspired by the example of the Rockefeller Center complex in New York. The centerpiece of his own design was known as the Palacio de la Luz (Palace of Light, a play on words denoting not only the light-filled building but also the power company itself - “luz” is the word commonly used by Uruguayans to refer to electricity in general). The 11-story Palacio de la Luz fills a full city block with its rectangular form of perfect symmetry, marked by soaring white vertical columnar ribs evenly separating dark vertical columns of glass – a design that Fresnedo would repeat in the main PAHO building. The Palacio de la Luz was an early example in Uruguay of a large, centrally air conditioned building with hermetically sealed windows. Fresnedo Siri located the mechanical systems in a central core to maximize natural light in all of the building's functional space, and engaged leading Uruguayan artists to contribute monumental mural and sculpture elements to the building. The building was awarded a gold medal in 1948 at the VI Pan American Congress of Architecture in Lima, Peru.

=== Sanatorio Americano ===
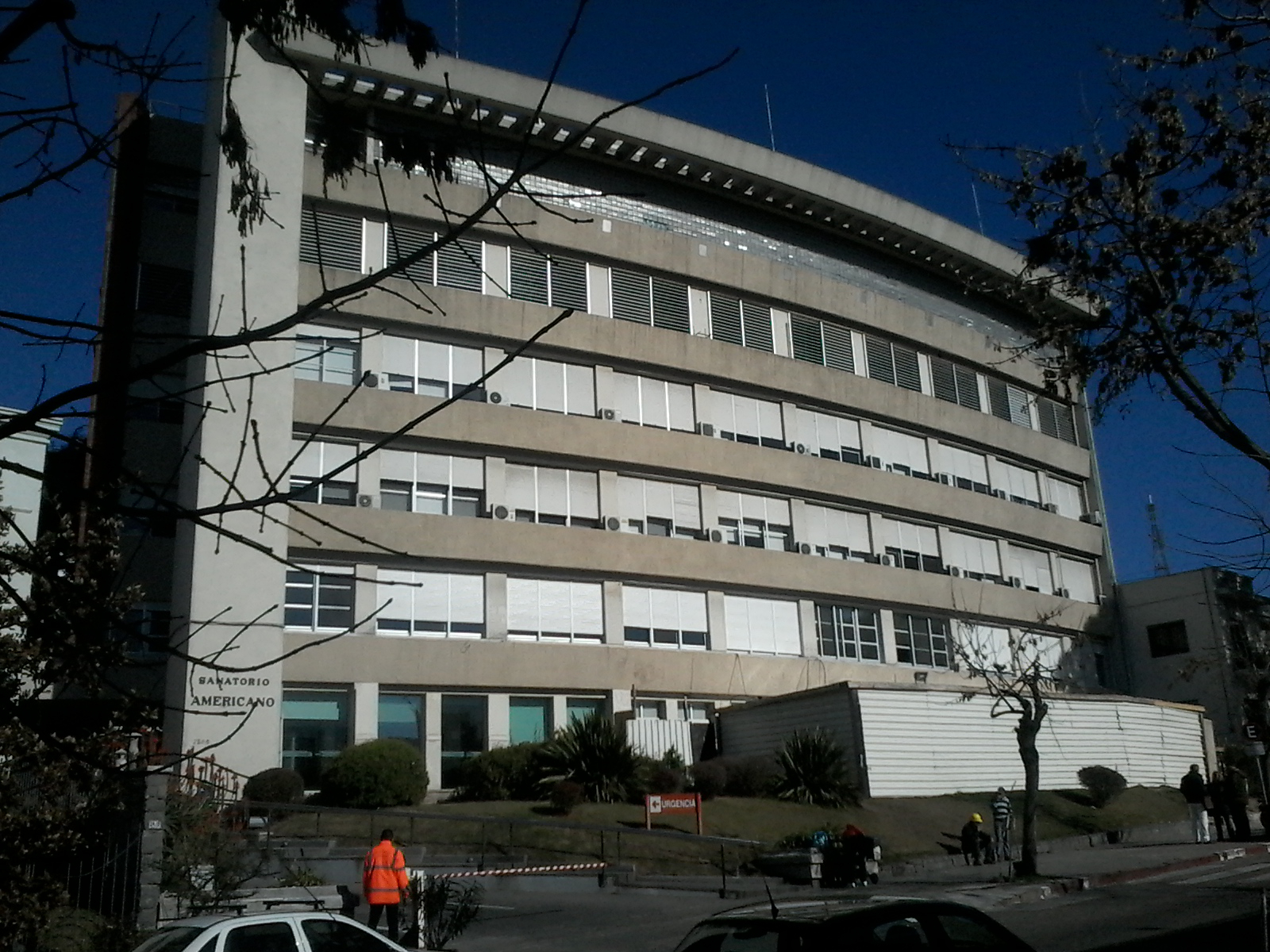
Sanatorio Americano

Another signature Fresnedo Siri building from the same period, Montevideo's Sanatorio Americano (American Hospital) of 1946 represented a new approach to hospital design, inverting the traditional model through which the patients were isolated inside within buildings that formed a barrier between the healthy outside and the sick inside. Fresnedo Siri wanted patients to be in visual contact with green spaces, and to feel integrated into the city around them. As with the earlier Architecture School main faculty building and the later PAHO design, his use of a long curve in the Sanatorio Americano building exemplified his consistent interest in blending expressionist elements into his architecture, just as his attention to the integration of landscape and building in the project reflected his enduring commitment to principles of organic architecture. The success of the Sanatorio Americano project won him recognition as a regional leader of hospital design. He would devote much of the 1950s to work in this area, including several large hospital facilities in Uruguay, another in São Paulo, Brazil and the National Hospital of Asuncion, Paraguay.

=== Hipodromo do Cristal ===
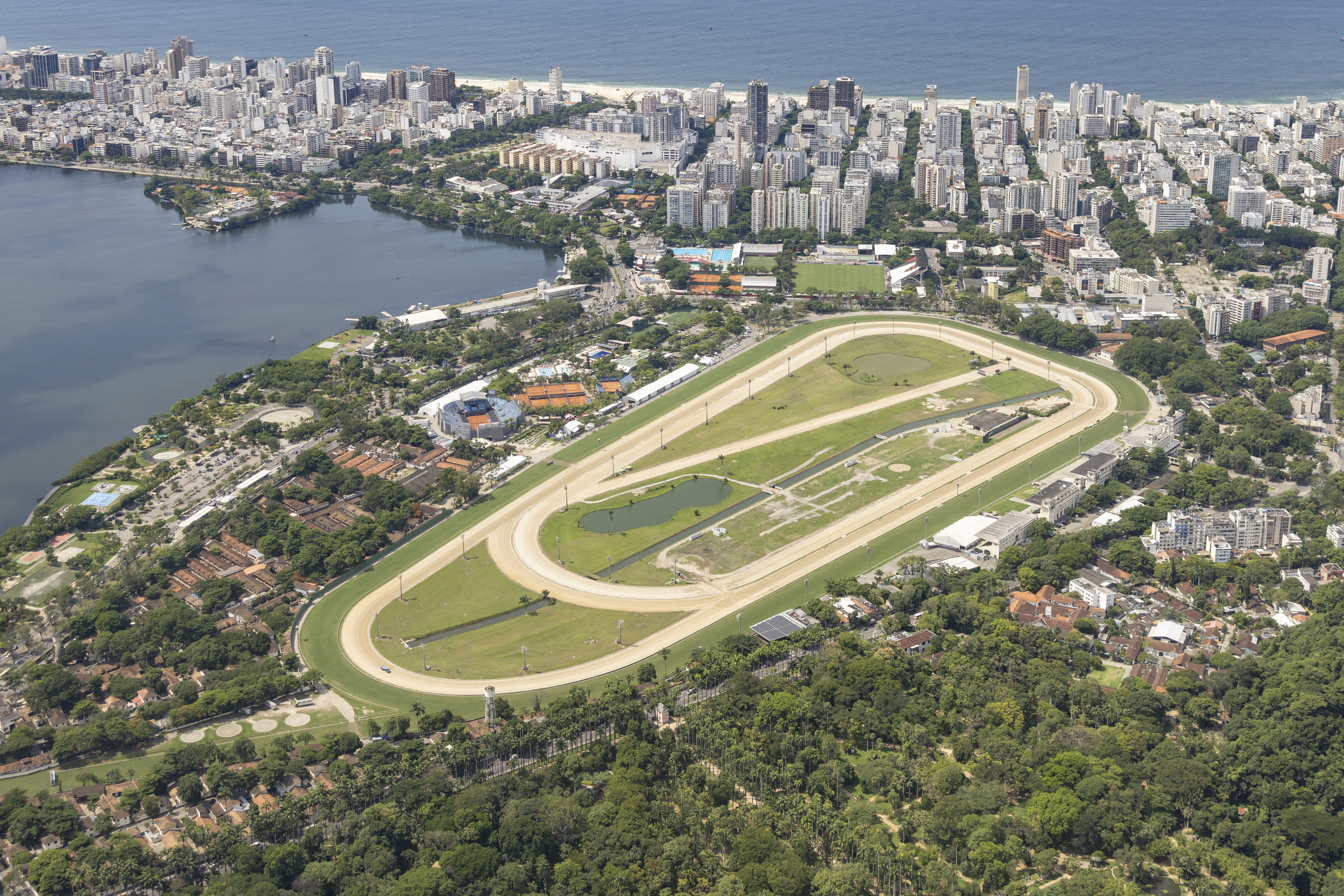
Hipodromo do Cristal

Sporting clubs and arenas formed another side specialty for the versatile architect, with projects dating back to 1930. Horseracing was then among the most popular sports in the region, with thousands crowding the tribunes from all social classes. The arenas were also important centers for elites, offering a weekend fresh-air outing with private club dining and social areas, and usually linked to an exclusive downtown “Jockey Club” location. In 1951, Fresnedo Siri won an international competition to design a horse racing complex in Porto Alegre, a major city of southern Brazil. The resulting Hipodromo do Cristal's flamboyant modern design and engineering innovations make it one of his most notable achievements. Brazilians today regard it as a landmark example of South American modernist architecture; the municipal government of Porto Alegre listed it as protected cultural historical patrimony in 2003.

=== Later life and death ===
Following the success of the PAHO building in Washington, the organization again commissioned him in 1971 to design its regional headquarters in Brazil. PAHO requested a similar design, seeking a sort of organizational “branding” through architecture. The resulting Brasilia complex is similarly anchored by a curved main office building with an attached cylindrical annex containing the main meeting hall. He supervised an additional PAHO project in Lima Peru in 1973, the PAHO Center for Sanitary Engineering and Environmental Sciences. Fresnedo Siri died in 1975.

== Selected works ==
Siri won acclaim for designing major civic buildings throughout South America, including offices and hospitals. He also had a passion for the ocean, and even used his talents to design racing yachts.

=== PAHO Headquarters Project ===
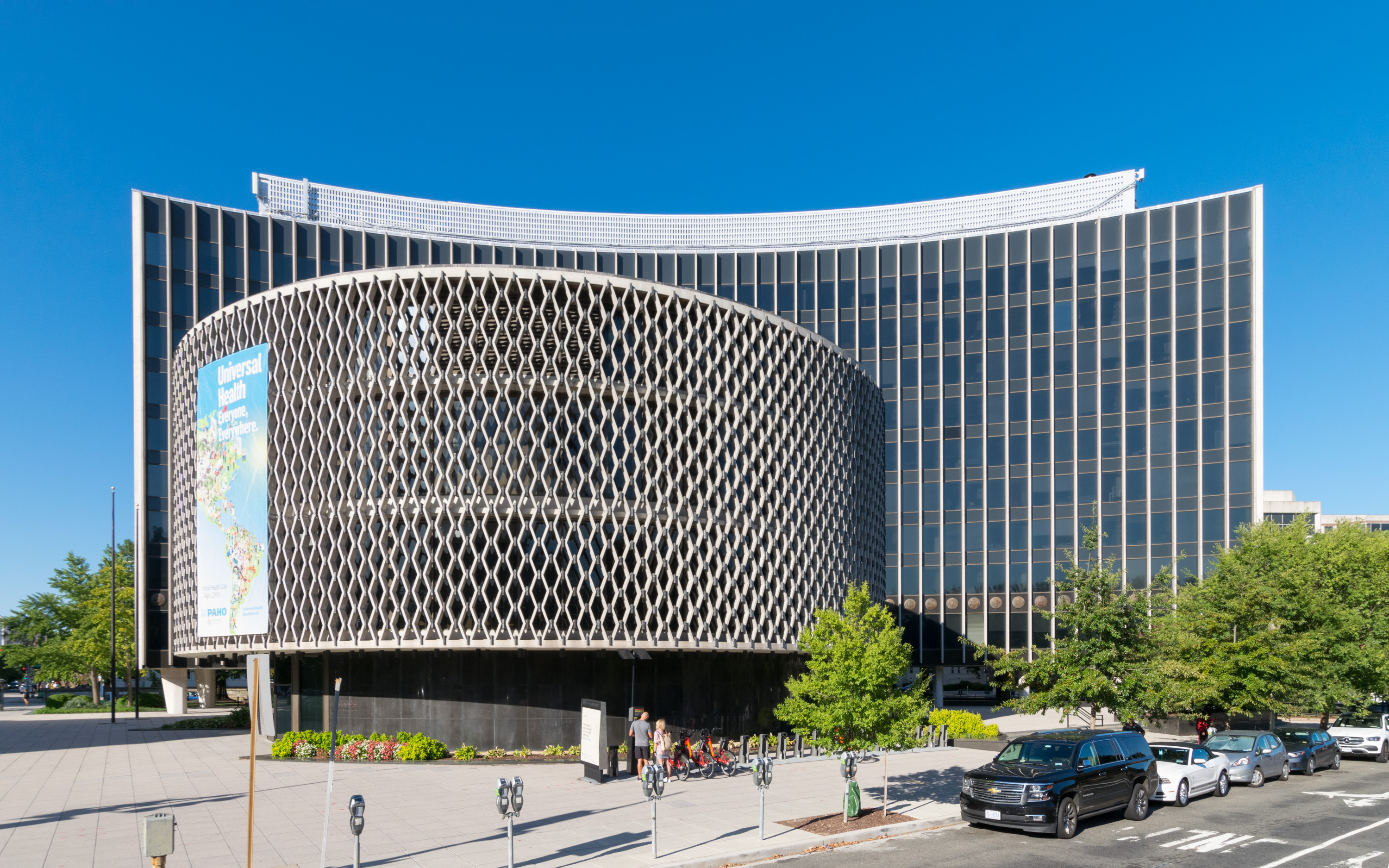
Pan American Health Organization building, Washington, DC

An international competition to choose the most original design had been won in 1961 by Siri. Just over two years after work began, the completed secretariat was ready to house hundreds of staff members in approximately 170,000 square feet (16,000 m^{2}) of space, furnished with marble, paintings, sculptures, and other gifts from PAHO member nations. The council chamber alone could accommodate 400 delegates within its circular walls. The new PAHO headquarters was officially opened on September 27, 1965.

=== Other works ===
Some of his prolific and significant architectural production are:

- Tribune Folle Ylla(1938) and Local Tribune(1945) in Hipodromo Nacional de Maroñas;
- Building of the Faculty of Architecture, Montevideo, opened in 1947 (in collaboration with his colleague Mario Muccinelli);
- Palace of Light, the headquarters of UTE in the neighborhood Arroyo Seco, Montevideo;
- Luis Batlle Berres monument, Montevideo, opened in 1967;
- American Hospital in the area of Parque Batlle, Montevideo;
- Hipodromo do Cristal, in Porto Alegre, Brazil;
- Headquarters of the Pan American Health Organization in Washington, D.C., United States, opened in 1965.
