= Grande Prêmio Bento Gonçalves =

- Class: Group 2
- Location: Hipodromo do Cristal; Porto Alegre, Brazil
- Inaugurated: 1909
- Race type: Thoroughbred - Flat racing

Race information
- Distance: 1 1/2 Miles (12 Furlongs)
- Surface: Dirt
- Track: left-handed
- Qualification: Three-year-olds and up
- Weight: Assigned

The Grande Prêmio Bento Gonçalves is a Group II left-handed flat race for three-year-olds and up in Brazil. It is the most important race in the state of Rio Grande do Sul.

Currently disputed over 2400 meters, every November at Hipodromo do Cristal.

The Grande Prêmio Bento Gonçalves is the oldest horse race in Brazil, having first been run in 1909.

== History ==
The Grande Prêmio Bento Gonçalves was created to promote horse racing with support from the government. It was first run in 1909 at Prado Riograndense. The 1910 edition was held at Hipódromo Moinhos de Vento, which continued to host the race until 1959 when it was moved to its current location of Hipódromo do Cristal.

The Grande Prêmio Bento Gonçalves is named in honor of General Bento Gonçalves.

Over the years, the Grande Prêmio Bento Gonçalves has been run over multiple distances:

- 2100 meters: 1909
- 2400 meters: 1972–
- 3000 meters: 1959–1971
- 3100 meters: 1910–1932
- 3200 meters: 1933–1958

== Records ==
Speed record:

- 2400 meters (current distance): 2:28.5 – Jack Grandi (1998)
- 2100 meters: 2:22 2/5 – Aguapehy (1909)
- 3000 meters: 3:13 – Vizcaino (1962)
- 3100 meters: 3:21 2/5 – Tic Tac (1919) & Glasgow (1920)
- 3200 meters: 3:28 1/5 – Estensoro (1958)

Most wins:

- 3 – El Asteroide (1964, 1965, 1966)
- 3 – Zirbo (1981, 1982, 1983)
- 3 – Hiper Gênio (1985, 1986, 1988)
- 3 – Ilustre Senador (2017, 2018, 2019)
- 2 – Duroc (1915, 1916)
- 2 – Pertinaz (1923, 1924)
- 2 – Chrysanthemo (1927, 1930)
- 2 – Scorpio (1929, 1931)
- 2 – Maritain (1937, 1939)
- 2 – Cravete (1950, 1951)
- 2 – Lord Antibes (1952, 1953)
- 2 – Uleanto (1975, 1976)
- 2 – Hero's Son (2002, 2003)
- 2 – Starman (2007, 2008)

Jockeys with multiple wins:

- 3 - Jorge Ricardo (2007, 2008, 2026)
- 2 - C. Albernaz (1975, 1976)
- 2 - Francisco Leandro (2010, 2012)
- 2 - Claudinei Farias (2019, 2025)

Most wins by a trainer:

- 6 – Paulo Rosa (1909, 1910, 1911, 1913, 1917, 1939)
- 5 – Artur Fernandes (1922, 1923, 1924, 1926, 1928)
- 4 – Antonio P. da Silva (1964, 1965, 1966, 1980)

Most wins by an owner:

- 4 – Breno Caldas (1958, 1964, 1965, 1966)
- 4 – Alberto J. Tiellet Miorim (2017, 2018, 2019, 2026)
- 3 – Antônio F. Martins (1981, 1982, 1983)
- 3 – Luis Antonio Pinheiro Machado (1985, 1986, 1988)

Most wins by a breeder:

- 6 – Fazenda da Mondesir (1981, 1982, 1983, 1984, 2004, 2005)
- 4 – Breno Caldas (1958, 1964, 1965, 1966)
- 4 – Haras São José da Serra (2007, 2008, 2011, 2012)

== Results ==
Winners of Grande Prêmio Bento Gonçalves
Year	Winner	Age	Jockey	Trainer	Owner	Breeder	Distance (meters)	Time	Group	Ref
1909	Aguapehy	6	A. Soares	Paulo Rosa	Ezequiel Ubatuba	Cabanha Santa Ecilda	2100	2:22 1/2		
1910	Pharamond	4		Paulo Rosa	Antenor Abreu	M. Boucherot	3100	3:38		
1911	Le Menillet	7		Paulo Rosa	M. H. de Araujo	M. Georges Rosenlecker	3100	3:32 2/5		
1912	Bochita ƒ	5		J. Rodrigues	Oswaldo Smith	Rufino Coll	3100	3:36 2/5		
1913	Ideal	3		Paulo Rosa	Jorge Carvalho	J. G. Elsey	3100	3:30		
1914	Condor	5		Elisio Feijo	Jorge Carvalho	Haras Henry Hawkins	3100	3:33 2/5		
1915	Duroc	5		Artur Fernandes	Hugo Bina	Jorge Pacheco	3100	3:31 3/5		
1916	Duroc	6		Firmino Prates	Hugo Bina	Jorge Pacheco	3100	3:35		
1917	Juancito	5		Paulo Rosa	Artur Hoffmann	Haras Viejo	3100	3:31		
1918	Crucero	5		João B. Machado	José Herculano Machado	Haras El Moro	3100	3:35		
1919	Tic Tac	4		Ponciano Ribeiro	Stud Delta	Haras Reyles	3100	3:21 2/5		
1920	Glasgow	6		Diogo Neves	Oswaldo Smith		3100	3:21 2/5		
1921	Cockney	5		Elisio Feijo	Júlio de O. Ramos	Haras Santa Ana	3100	3:22		
1922	Precurosr	7		Artur Fernandes	Stud El Condor	Haras Chacabuco	3100	3:24 1/5		
1923	Pertinaz	6		Artur Fernandes	José Carvalho	Rodolfo Taurel	3100	3:28 4/5		
1924	Pertinaz	7		Artur Fernandes	José Carvalho	Rodolfo Taurel	3100	3:26 3/5		
1925	Maestro	5		Euclides Ribeiro	Luiz Alves de Castro	Haras Montevideo	3100	3:21 3/5		
1926	Decamps	6		Artur Fernandes	Artur Fernandes	Haras Los Cardales	3100	3:24		
1927	Chrysanthemo	4		Ovidio Miranda	Adolfo Lorentz	Haras Quebracho	3100	3:27 2/5		
1928	Edison	5		Artur Fernandes		Haras Casupá	3100	3:33		
1929	Scorpio	6		Pedro Silva	Stud El Turf	Haras Los PInos	3100	3:19 2/5		
1930	Chrysanthemo	7		Israel Souza	Adolfo Lorentz	Haras Quebracho	3100	3:27 1/5		
1931	Scorpio	8		Pedro Silva	Stud El Turf	Haras Los PInos	3100	3:28 4/5		
1932	Cifrão	4		Adolfo Cardoso	Mário Difini	Júlio Faria Filho	3100	3:28		
1933	Gin Puro	5		Elpidio Correa	J. A. Flores da Cunha	Mitre, Paats & Cia	3200	3:34 3/5		
1934	Duggan	8		Demetrio Rodrigues	João Magni	Júlio Faria Filho	3200	3:32 4/5		
1935	Bentancor	3		Pedro Silva			3200	3:33 2/5		
1936	Kosmos	8		Otvio Guimarães	E&A Assumpção	E&A Assumpção	3200	3:34 4/5		
1937	Maritain	4		Irany Ribeiro			3200	3:31 1/5		
1938	Cabalista	6		Ademar Ayala	Haras La Ernestina	Haras Casupá	3200	3:33 2/5		
1939	Maritain	6		Paulo Rosa			3200	3:32		
1940	Falangista	6		Augustin Dias	Oswaldo H. Gutheil	Agustín Díaz	3200	3:36 1/5		
1941	Diogenes	4		Augustin Dias			3200	3:35		
1942	Tam-Tam	5		Roberto Oliveira Filho			3200	3:33 2/5		
1943	Seductor	5		Irany Ribeiro			3200	3:34 4/5		
1944	Secreto	4		Antenor Benites			3200	3:38 3/5		
1945	Trompo	5		Epaminondas Nunes			3200	3:33		
1946	Camaron	4		Roberto Oliveira Filho			3200	3:37 4/5		
1947	Sonada ƒ	4		Inacio Vieira		Haras Casupá	3200	3:36		
1948	Cloro	7		Ary Vasconcelos			3200	3:36		
1949	Acheron	4		A. Rosa			3200	3:37 1/5		
1950	Cravete	5		Camilo Iberra	Amalia Oliveira		3200	3:30 4/5		
1951	Cravete	6		Camilo Iberra			3200	3:36		
1952	Lord Antibes	5		Oswaldo Feijo	Serafin D. Vargas	Leon Volterra	3200	3:34 1/5		
1953	Lord Antibes	6		Adolfo Cardoso	Serafin D. Vargas	Leon Volterra	3200	3:34		
1954	Best	6		Ildemaro Avia	Almiro Coimbra	Haras Uruguay	3200	3:30		
1955	Salomão	4		Nereu Miltzaek	Atilio Loss Tedesco		3200	3:33 1/5		
1956	Arizu	4		Gregorio Arrascaeta			3200	3:32		
1957	Buen Mozo	4		J. Perez	Juan Straneo	Haras Uruguay	3200	3:30 2/5		
1958	Estensoro	3		Ervandil Lopes	Breno Caldas	Breno Caldas	3200	3:28 1/5		
1959	Chaval	4		Roberto Morgado	José Miguel Kalil	José Miguel Kalil	3000	3:18 3/5		
1960	Zago	4		Milton Farias	Humberto Felizzola	Haras Santa Margarida	3000	3:18		
1961	Argonaço	4		Longuinho Pereira	Stud Whisky	José Guido Orlandini	3000	3:15 4/5		
1962	Vizcaino	5		Faustino Costa	Stud Josecito	Haras Chapadmalal	3000	3:13		
1963	Polar Venus	3		José Celestino da Silva		João Goulart	3000	3:18 2/5		
1964	El Asteroide	4		Antonio P. da Silva	Breno Caldas	Breno Caldas	3000	3:16 1/5		
1965	El Asteroide	5		Antonio P. da Silva	Breno Caldas	Breno Caldas	3000	3:17 4/5		
1966	El Asteroide	6		Antonio P. da Silva	Breno Caldas	Breno Caldas	3000	3:15		
1967	Dilema	4		Amazilio Magalhães	Stud Maioral	Haras Terra Branca	3000	3:16 1/5		
1968	Corejada ƒ	4		Ervandil Lopes	Haras do Arado	Haras do Arado	3000	3:15 3/5		
1969	Light Romu	4		Pedro Lopes	Haras Dois Pierre	Haras Santa Margarida	3000	3:14 2/5		
1970	Lexikon	5		José Celestino da Silva	Jeronimo M. da Silveira	Jeronimo M. da Silveira	3000	3:14 2/5		
1971	Negroni	6		E. P. Gusso	Haras Ipiranga	Haras Ipiranga	3000	3:16 1/5		
1972	Locomotor	4		Manuel Dacosta			2400	2:34 4/5		
1973	Chupito	5	Hugo R. Lopez	Jorge Lema	Stud Cané Pampa	Haras Los Muchachos	2400	2:35		
1974	Good Bloke	4	J. Torres	Alfonso Salvati	Stud Don Yayo	Haras Don Yayo	2400	2:32 2/5		
1975	Uleanto	5	C. Albernaz	Milton Farias	Delmar B. Martins	Haras Jahu e Rio das Pedras	2400	2:32 1/5	2	
1976	Uleanto	6	C. Albernaz	Milton Farias	Delmar B. Martins & José Luiz Corrêa Pinto	Haras Jahu e Rio das Pedras	2400	2:31 2/5	2	
1977	Zabro	4	J. Garcia	Lodgar B. Gonçalves	Haras Jaú	Haras Jaú-Rio das Pedras	2400	2:30.6	2	
1978	Jeton	5	O. Batista	Loir Machado	Stud Gina	Haras Sideral, José Mariano Camargo Raggio	2400	2:31.0	2	
1979	Garve	4	S. Rodrigues	Clovis Dutra	Alcides Brum e Stud Rolante	Haras Limoeiro	2400	2:37.4	2	
1980	Artung	5	J. M. Silva	Antonio P. da Silva	Stud B.B.C.	Cia. Agro-Pastoril Tibagi	2400	2:32.2	1	
1981	Zirbo	3	M. Silveira	Ivo V. Pereira	Antônio F. Martins	Fazenda da Mondesir	2400	2:34.4	1	
1982	Zirbo	4	E. Amorim	Ivo V. Pereira	Antônio F. Martins	Fazenda da Mondesir	2400	2:34.2	1	
1983	Zirbo	5	H. Freitas	Antonio Alvani	Antônio F. Martins	Fazenda da Mondesir	2400	2:33.0	1	
1984	Zirkel	6	A. Oliveira	Gernasio Fagundes	Stud Ponte Nova	Fazenda da Mondesir	2400	2:33.8	1	
1985	Hiper Gênio	3	J. G. Dutra	Holmes M. Silva	Luiz Antonio PInheiro Machado	Haras São Quirino	2400	2:31.0	1	
1986	Hiper Gênio	3		C. Dutra	Luiz Antonio PInheiro Machado	Haras São Quirino	2400	2:37	1	
1987	Eldan	4		Ivo V. Pereiraa	Israel Pipkin	Haras Fronteira P.A.P.	2400	2:35 1/5	1	
1988	Hiper Gênio	6		Holmes M. Silva	Luiz Antonio PInheiro Machado	Haras São Quirino	2400	2:32 1/5	1	
1989	Pelecho	4		Nereu Miltzarek	Haras Recanto do Sul	Paulo Rosa Waihrich	2400	2:33	1	
1990	Ardito	5		Carlos R. Soares	Altamiro B. de Souza	Haras Kigrandi	2400	2:31 2/5	1	
1991	Aioroso	5		Sidnei Benites	Carlos Roberto Dias	Celso Rodrigues Dionizio	2400	2:36.1	1	
1992	Don Nige	6		Noe Camargo	Haras Santa Barbara do Sul	Haras Santa Barbara do Sul	2400	2:33.1	1	
1993	Free Ho	6		Flavio Silva	Stud Platina	Haras Simpatia	2400	2:31.1	1	
1994	Super Purple	4		C. Santos	Francisco F. Martins Marcantonio	Haras Rosa do Sul	2400	2:31.0	1	
1995	C'est Donzy	3		W. Cutino	Stud Pingo Azul	Haras Divisadero	2400	2:31.0	1	
1996	Mando Toss	6		M. Moreno	Stud Gold Black	Haras La Biznaga	2400	2:33.1	1	
1997	Kashmir Valley	7		N. Vanut	Stud Pousada de Esperança	Haras Inshalla	2400	2:31.5	1	
1998	Jack Grandi	4		J. S. Silva	Haras Kigrandi	Haras Kigrandi	2400	2:28.5	1	
1999	Gran Ricci	5		A. Alvani		Ari Lima	2400	2:30.0	1	
2000	Horowicks	5		S. Xavier	Stud Le Cheval	Haras América	2400	2:29.7	1	
2001	Elo de Prata	4		Amazilio Magalhães Filho	Haras Bandeirantes	Haras Bandeirantes	2400	2:33.0	1	
2002	Hero's Son	5		Eduardo Garcia	Stud TNT	Stud TNT	2400	2:33.0	1	
2003	Hero's Son	6		Eduardo Garcia	Stud TNT	Stud TNT	2400	2:32.0	1	
2004	Amor Eterno	6	A. Gulart	D. Minetto	Luiz Lima & Flavio Obino Filho	Fazenda da Mondesir	2400	2:35.0	1	
2005	Eagle Pines	3	E. Lima	S. Benites	Carlos R. Dias & José Vecchio Filho	Fazenda da Mondesir	2400	2:30.9	1	
2006	Mata Leao	5	T. J. Pereira	S. Benites	Stud Cinquenta e Dois	Haras Ponta Porã	2400	2:31.6	1	
2007	Starman	3	Jorge Ricardo	D. Guignoni	Stud H & R	Haras São José da Serra	2400	2:30.8	1	
2008	Starman	4	Jorge Ricardo	D. Guignoni	Stud H & R	Haras São José da Serra	2400	2:30.3	1	
2009	Goecochea	3		Hermínio Machado	RBM Importção e Exportação Ltda.	Beverly Hills Stud	2400	2:31.0	1	
2010	Quanto Mais	5	Francisco Leandro	Marcus Vinicius Lanza	Stud Sampaio e Benevides	Haras Ponta Porã	2400	2:29.5	1	
2011	Stockholder	4	Marcos Mazini	D. Guignoni	Coudelaria Barcelona	Haras São José da Serra	2400	2:30.7	1	
2012	Beduino Do Brasil	3	Francisco Leandro	Carlos Pereir Gusso	Haras São José dos Pinhais	Haras São José dos Pinhais	2400	2:29.0	1	
2013	Victory Is Ours	4	Josiane Gulart	Adail Oliveira	Stud TNT / Haras Vale Verde	Stud TNT / Haras Vale Verde	2400	2:30.1	1	
2014	Whoopee Maker	3	Vagner Borges	Luiz C. Avila	RBM Importção e Exportação Ltda.	Haras Ponta Porã	2400	2:37.6	1	
2015	Diesmal	3	Ivaldo Santana	Marcelo Rosa	Stud Vaccaro	Haras Santa Maria de Araras	2400	2:41.5	1	
2016	Bagé in Concert	3	William P. Silva	Luiz C. Avila	Stud Miguel Ávila	Haras Santa Rita do Portão	2400	2:36.5	2	
2017	Ilustre Senador	4	André Luiz Silva	Valter dos Santos Lopes	Alberto J. Tiellet Miorim	Haras Figueira do Lago	2400	2:37.3	2	
2018	Ilustre Senador	5	Valmir Rocha	Valter dos Santos Lopes	Alberto J. Tiellet Miorim	Haras Figueira do Lago	2400	2:41.7	2	
2019	Ilustre Senador	6	Claudinei Farias	Valter dos Santos Lopes	Alberto J. Tiellet Miorim	Haras Figueira do Lago	2400	2:38.1	2	
2020	American Tiz	5	Marcelo Bruno Souza	A. Soares	Maurício Roriz dos Santos	Paulo Neri de Lima Bergamo	2400	2:41.2	2	
2021	Hall Pass	5	M. Gonçalves	Antônio Carlos Silveira	Stud Duplo Ouro	Haras Santa Maria de Araras	2400	2:39.0	2	
2022	El Cosechero	5	A. Renan	Hilton Pires	Fabiane de Mattos	Fabiane de Mattos	2400	2:39.6	2	
2023	Dear-Vet	3	W. Blandi	Rogerio Arias	Haras das Araucárias	Haras San Francesco	2400	2:37.6	2	
2024	Uma Vez Flamengo	4	Wesley Cardoso	Venâncio Nahid	Haras Doce Vale	Haras Doce Vale	2400	2:37.7	2	
2025	Único Lô	4	Claudinei Farias	Neimar Canut	Luiz Henrique F. dos Santos	Haras Capela de Santana	2400	2:35.6	2	
2026	Intimidator	4	Jorge Ricardo	Elziar Santos	Alberto J. Tiellet Miorim	Haras Ereporã	2400	2:36.8	2	

ƒ designates a filly or mare winner
