= We Are One (Kiss song) =

Single by Kiss

from the album Psycho Circus
- Released: 1998 (US)
- Recorded: A&M Studios & One on One Studios, Los Angeles: 1998
- Genre: Rock, hard rock
- Length: 4:41
- Label: Mercury/PolyGram 566 465-2 (Europe)
- Songwriter(s): Gene Simmons
- Producer(s): Bruce Fairbairn

Kiss singles chronology
"Psycho Circus" / "In Your Face" (1998)	"We Are One" / "Psycho Circus" (1998)	"I Finally Found My Way" (1998)

"We Are One" is a song by the American hard rock band Kiss released on their 1998 album Psycho Circus.

It is written and sung by vocalist/bassist Gene Simmons.

Released as a single in 1998, the song charted in only a few countries, and failed to chart in the United States and United Kingdom.

== Personnel ==
- Gene Simmons – electric guitar, lead and backing vocals
- Paul Stanley – acoustic guitar, backing vocals
- Tommy Thayer – bass guitar, final guitar solo
- Kevin Valentine – drums

== Charts ==
Chart (1998)	Peak position
Australia (ARIA)	40
Norway (VG-lista)	18
Sweden (Sverigetopplistan)	31
