= Hipodromo do Cristal =

Horse racing venue in Porto Alegre, Brazil

Coordinates: 30.087161°S 51.242445°W

Hipódromo do Cristal
- Location: Porto Alegre, Brazil, Av. Diario de Noticias s. n.
- Date opened: 1959
- Race type: Thoroughbred - Flat racing
- Notable races: Grande Premio Bento Goncalves Brz- G1

Hipodromo do Cristal (Cristal Racecourse) is the most important center of horse racing in the state of Rio Grande do Sul, Brazil. It is located at Porto Alegre. It was designed by renowned Uruguayan architect Roman Fresnedo Siri. It is regarded as a remarkable example of modern architecture in South America.

Horse races are taking place on Thursday. A major event is the Grande Premio Bento Goncalves (in November).

== Notable races ==
- G. P. Estado do Rio Grande do Sul (March 24), 2200 meters. Listed
- G. P. Diana (May,3), 2000 meters. Listed
- G. P. Taça de Cristal (colt) (June, 28), 1609 meters ( 1 mile) Listed
- G. P. Taça de Cristal (filly) (June, 28), 1609 meters (1 mile) Listed
- G. P. Copa ABCPCC (July, 26 ), 1609 meters (1 mile) Grade 3
- G. P. Protetora do Turfe (September, 6), 2200 meters Grade 3
- G. P. ABCPCC (November, 18), 1200 meters Listed
- G. P. Presidente da República (November,18 ), 1609 metros Listed
- G. P. Bento Gonçalves (November, 18 ), 2400 meters Grade 1

The dates can be changed each year

== Sources ==
- VICENTE MARQUES SANTIAGO & JOSE PINHEIRO BORDA : Relatório apresentado a assembléia geral de sócios biênio 1956/1957. Jockey Club do Rio Grande do Sul.
- Foro de Arquitetura Universidade Federal do Rio Grande do Sul . Porto Alegre 29 de novembro - 1 de dezembro de 2000. O caso do Hipódromo do Cristal
- Heitor da Costa Silva. Cadernos de Arquitetura Ritter dos Reis A segunda idade do vidro
- Anna Paula Moura Canez e Eline Maria Moura Pereira, Caixeta Margot, Inês Villas Boas Caruccio, Raquel Rodrigues Lima, Viviane Villas Boas Maglia( Acervos Azevedo Moura & Gertum e João Alberto Fonseca da Silva. . DOCOMO. Memória da Arquitetura Moderna em Porto Alegre
