= Alive/Worldwide Tour =

1996–1997 concert tour by Kiss

- Tour by Kiss
- Poster to the concert in Belgrade, Yugoslavia
- Start date: June 28, 1996
- End date: July 5, 1997
- No. of shows: 190 played, 8 cancelled

Kiss concert chronology
- Kiss My Ass Tour (1994–1995); Alive/Worldwide Tour (1996–1997); Psycho Circus World Tour (1998–1999)

The Alive/Worldwide Tour (also known as the Reunion Tour) was a concert tour by American rock band Kiss which began on June 28, 1996 in Detroit, United States and concluded on July 5, 1997 in London, England. It was the first tour with original members Peter Criss and Ace Frehley since the Dynasty Tour in 1979.

== Background ==
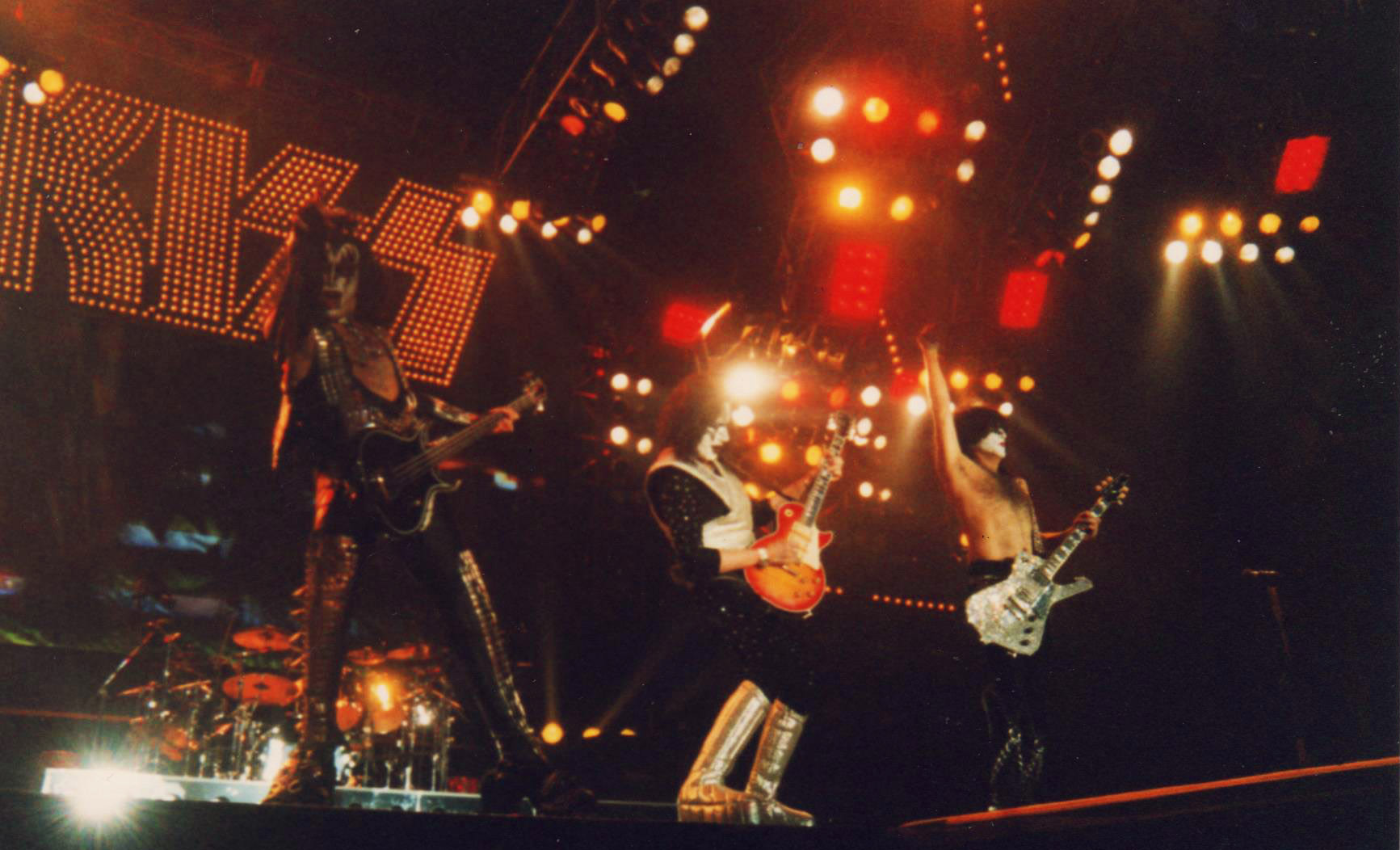
Kiss performing in Utrecht on June 11, 1997.

While Kiss continued to exist publicly as Simmons, Stanley, Kulick and Singer, arrangements for a reunion of the original lineup were in the works. These efforts culminated with a public event as dramatic as any the band had staged since its 1983 unmasking on MTV. With those statements, Tupac Shakur introduced the original Kiss lineup, in full makeup and Love Gun-era stage outfits, to a rousing ovation at the 38th Annual Grammy Awards on February 28, 1996:

You know how the Grammys used to be, all straight-looking folks with suits. Everybody looking tired. No surprises. We tired of that. We need something different, something new, we need to shock the people ... so let's shock the people!

On April 16, 1996, the band members held a press conference aboard the USS Intrepid in New York City, where they announced their plans for a full-fledged reunion tour, with the help of new manager Doc McGhee. The conference, MC'd by Conan O'Brien, was simulcast to 58 countries. On April 20, nearly 40,000 tickets for the tour's first show sold out in 47 minutes. The band would bring back their vintage stunts, including Simmons' blood-spitting and fire-breathing, Frehley's smoking and shooting guitar, pyrotechnics and platform risers.

The members worked out to get into better physical shape for the tour, with Frehley going for plastic surgery, as Stanley stated that they 'did not want people to be disappointed when they saw a bunch of fat guys in tights'.

Following rehearsals, Kiss began their reunion tour on June 15, 1996 with a warmup gig in Irvine, California for the KROQ Weenie Roast. It was considered by the band to be a live rehearsal for many aspects of the stage show before the tour was set to begin at a sold out Tiger Stadium in Detroit on June 28, 1996, playing to approximately 40,000 people. The tour lasted for 192 shows over the course of one year and earned $43.6 million, making Kiss the top-drawing concert act of 1996. On April 5, 1997 during the band's show at the Columbus Civic Center, Criss was unable to perform, resulting in the band bringing in the drum technician Ed Kanon for that performance.

In the tour program for the band's final tour, Stanley reflected on the tour:

There were many many nights when I was looking around the stage and going "This is magic." This is beyond anybody's wildest fantasies. What was important about these shows is we had a much bigger task than people understood. Our biggest competition was our history. We didn't have to be as good as we used to be. We had to be as good as people thought we were. The show wasn't to be a replica of what we've done, it was to be what people imagined we had done. We had to be totally committed. and also totally sure that we could not only live up the legend but also surpass it. In terms of the stage show for the reunion tour, what we wanted to do was look at the '77 show in a sense as a pinnacle. That is what we chose to build on but not copy. There are also elements from other shows too in the sense that there's bombs and the flying rig and the breaking of the guitars. At that time, it was the ultimate Kiss show in the sense that we looked at the show, which we thought was our best and said, "Top this."

== Reception ==
For the warmup performance at the KROQ "Weenie Roast", a reporter from the Los Angeles Times noted on the weak, stringy voice of Stanley, claiming that he was ill-equipped for his operatic style that 'it's almost heroic for him to even try'. He noted that Kiss still looked and sounded like Kiss, noting on the teamwork that the band were sharing during the performance, concluding that both Criss and Frehley were now 'reconciled for fun and lots of profit'.

A reporter from Rolling Stone who attended the first show of the tour at Tiger Stadium in Detroit, stated: "Sure, Kiss suck, but give them a little credit - they've sucked for more than 20 years. Surviving has meant the band has lived long enough to see its influence on the next generation, which perhaps explains the shocking spectacle of Billy Corgan and Sebastian Bach bonding backstage. So, OK, maybe Kiss don't suck. And in their defense, it should be shouted out loud that they were one of the first bands to embrace fully the notion of rock as a show, thus putting them ahead of the curve that would soon bring us Cats and the re-emergence of Las Vegas as the new American capital."

From the final show in London at Finsbury Park, a reporter from The Independent stated: "As you'd expect with Kiss, it was one of the best stage entrances ever but, apart from a few moments, the gig soon sagged. They retained some interest through theatrics... the fact that all this was going on in daylight didn't help but when dusk fell, Kiss moved up several gears. Since it was the last night of a world tour that started over a year ago, sentimentality was a recurring theme. Singer and band spokesman Paul Stanley babbled on how important the Kiss Army were and how he'd like to get among them... If this was theatre, it was the theatre of the absurd, where the joke seemed to be on Kiss, until, finally, you realized that you'd had been laughing with them, not at them, all along."

== Set list ==
The following set list was performed at the warmup show of the tour in Irvine, California and is not intended to represent all of the shows on tour.

1. "Deuce"
2. "Love Gun"
3. "Cold Gin"
4. "Calling Dr. Love"
5. "Firehouse"
6. "Shock Me"
7. "100,000 Years"
8. "Detroit Rock City"
9. "Black Diamond"

Encore

10. "Rock and Roll All Nite"

== Tour dates ==
List of 1996 concerts, showing date, city, country, venue, and opening acts
Date	City	Country	Venue	Opening Act(s)
June 15, 1996	Irvine	United States	Irvine Meadows Amphitheatre	Red Hot Chili Peppers
June 28, 1996	Detroit	United States	Tiger Stadium	Alice in Chains; Sponge
June 30, 1996	Louisville	United States	Freedom Hall	Alice in Chains
July 2, 1996	St. Louis	United States	Kiel Center	Alice in Chains
July 3, 1996	Kansas City	United States	Kemper Arena	Alice in Chains
July 5, 1996	Dallas	United States	Reunion Arena	Pushmonkey
July 6, 1996	Houston	United States	The Summit	Pushmonkey
July 7, 1996	San Antonio	United States	Alamodome	Pushmonkey
July 9, 1996	New Orleans	United States	Louisiana Superdome	The Melvins
July 10, 1996	Memphis	United States	Pyramid Arena	The Melvins
July 12, 1996	Moline	United States	The MARK of the Quad Cities	The Melvins
July 13, 1996	Saint Paul	United States	St. Paul Civic Center	The Melvins
July 14, 1996	Rosemont	United States	Rosemont Horizon	The Melvins
July 16, 1996	Rosemont	United States	Rosemont Horizon	The Nixons
July 17, 1996	Fairborn	United States	Ervin J. Nutter Center	The Nixons
July 19, 1996	Cleveland	United States	Gund Arena	The Nixons
July 20, 1996	Cleveland	United States	Gund Arena	D Generation
July 21, 1996	Pittsburgh	United States	Civic Arena	The Nixons
July 22, 1996	Pittsburgh	United States	Civic Arena	D Generation
July 25, 1996	New York City	United States	Madison Square Garden	D Generation
July 26, 1996	New York City	United States	Madison Square Garden	CIV
July 27, 1996	New York City	United States	Madison Square Garden	311
July 28, 1996	New York City	United States	Madison Square Garden	The Nixons
July 30, 1996	Boston	United States	FleetCenter	The Nixons
July 31, 1996	Boston	United States	FleetCenter	D Generation
August 2, 1996	Quebec City	Canada	Colisée de Quebec	D Generation
August 3, 1996	Montreal	Canada	Molson Centre	D Generation
August 5, 1996	Ottawa	Canada	Corel Centre	D Generation
August 6, 1996	Toronto	Canada	SkyDome	D Generation
August 8, 1996	Cincinnati	United States	Riverfront Coliseum	D Generation
August 9, 1996	Indianapolis	United States	Market Square Arena	D Generation
August 10, 1996	Milwaukee	United States	Bradley Center	D Generation
August 17, 1996 (Note: The concert on August 17, 1996, was a part of Monsters of Rock.)	Leicestershire	England	Castle Donington	—N/a
August 21, 1996	Phoenix	United States	America West Arena	Stabbing Westward
August 23, 1996	Inglewood	United States	Great Western Forum	Stabbing Westward
August 24, 1996	Inglewood	United States	Great Western Forum	Stabbing Westward
August 25, 1996	Inglewood	United States	Great Western Forum	Red Five
August 27, 1996	San Jose	United States	San Jose Arena	Stabbing Westward
August 28, 1996	Sacramento	United States	ARCO Arena	Stabbing Westward
August 30, 1996	Portland	United States	Rose Garden Arena	Stabbing Westward
August 31, 1996	Tacoma	United States	Tacoma Dome	Stabbing Westward
September 1, 1996	Spokane	United States	Spokane Arena	Stabbing Westward
September 2, 1996	Vancouver	Canada	General Motors Place	Stabbing Westward
September 5, 1996	Salt Lake City	United States	Delta Center	The Hunger
September 7, 1996	Denver	United States	McNichols Sports Arena	The Hunger
September 8, 1996	Denver	United States	McNichols Sports Arena	The Hunger
September 10, 1996	Valley Center	United States	Britt Brown Arena	The Hunger
September 11, 1996	Oklahoma City	United States	Myriad Convention Center	The Hunger
September 13, 1996	Tupelo	United States	Tupelo Coliseum	The Hunger
September 14, 1996	Birmingham	United States	BJCC Coliseum	The Hunger
September 15, 1996	Pensacola	United States	Pensacola Civic Center	The Verve Pipe
September 17, 1996	Miami	United States	Miami Arena	The Verve Pipe
September 19, 1996	Jacksonville	United States	Jacksonville Coliseum	The Verve Pipe
September 20, 1996	St. Petersburg	United States	Thunderdome	The Verve Pipe
September 22, 1996	Orlando	United States	Orlando Arena	The Verve Pipe
September 24, 1996	North Charleston	United States	North Charleston Coliseum	The Verve Pipe
September 25, 1996	Columbia	United States	Carolina Coliseum	The Verve Pipe
September 27, 1996	Charlotte	United States	Charlotte Coliseum	The Verve Pipe
September 28, 1996	Greensboro	United States	Greensboro Coliseum	The Verve Pipe
September 29, 1996	Knoxville	United States	Thompson–Boling Arena	The Verve Pipe
October 1, 1996	Atlanta	United States	Omni Coliseum	The Verve Pipe
October 2, 1996	Atlanta	United States	Omni Coliseum	The Bogmen
October 4, 1996	Roanoke	United States	Roanoke Civic Center	The Bogmen
October 5, 1996	Hampton	United States	Hampton Coliseum	The Bogmen
October 6, 1996	Landover	United States	USAir Arena	The Bogmen
October 7, 1996	Landover	United States	USAir Arena	Deftones
October 8, 1996	Philadelphia	United States	CoreStates Center	The Bogmen
October 9, 1996	Philadelphia	United States	CoreStates Center	Deftones
October 11, 1996	Philadelphia	United States	CoreStates Center	Deftones
October 12, 1996	Albany	United States	Knickerbocker Arena	Deftones
October 13, 1996	Buffalo	United States	Marine Midland Arena	Deftones
October 15, 1996	Indianapolis	United States	Market Square Arena	Deftones
October 16, 1996	Auburn Hills	United States	The Palace of Auburn Hills	Deftones
October 17, 1996	Auburn Hills	United States	The Palace of Auburn Hills	Coyote Shivers
October 18, 1996	Lexington	United States	Rupp Arena	Deftones
October 20, 1996	Cleveland	United States	Gund Arena	Deftones
October 21, 1996	Rosemont	United States	Rosemont Horizon	Deftones
October 23, 1996	Omaha	United States	Omaha Civic Auditorium	Royal Crown Revue
October 24, 1996	Omaha	United States	Omaha Civic Auditorium	Royal Crown Revue
October 26, 1996	Las Cruces	United States	Pan American Center	Fluffy
October 27, 1996	Albuquerque	United States	Tingley Coliseum	Fluffy
October 29, 1996	San Diego	United States	San Diego Sports Arena	Caroline's Spine
October 31, 1996	Irvine	United States	Irvine Meadows Amphitheatre	Poe
November 1, 1996	Irvine	United States	Irvine Meadows Amphitheatre	Reel Big Fish
November 2, 1996	Las Vegas	United States	MGM Grand Garden Arena	Caroline's Spine
November 5, 1996	Austin	United States	Frank Erwin Center	Johnny Bravo
November 6, 1996	Lafayette	United States	Cajundome	Johnny Bravo
November 7, 1996	Shreveport	United States	Hirsch Memorial Coliseum	Johnny Bravo
November 9, 1996	Little Rock	United States	Barton Coliseum	Johnny Bravo
November 10, 1996	Dallas	United States	Reunion Arena	Johnny Bravo
November 20, 1996	Birmingham	England	NEC Arena	The Verve Pipe
November 21, 1996	Manchester	England	NYNEX Arena	The Verve Pipe
November 25, 1996	London	England	Wembley Arena	The Verve Pipe
December 1, 1996	Brussels	Belgium	Forest National	The Verve Pipe
December 2, 1996	Paris	France	Zénith de Paris	The Verve Pipe
December 4, 1996	Berlin	Germany	Deutschlandhalle	Die Ärzte
December 6, 1996	Stockholm	Sweden	Globen Arena	The Verve Pipe
December 7, 1996	Gothenburg	Sweden	Scandinavium	The Verve Pipe
December 8, 1996	Oslo	Norway	Oslo Spektrum	The Verve Pipe
December 10, 1996	Rotterdam	Netherlands	Rotterdam Ahoy	The Verve Pipe
December 11, 1996	Frankfurt	Germany	Festhalle Frankfurt	Die Ärzte
December 12, 1996	Oberhausen	Germany	Oberhausen Arena	Die Ärzte
December 14, 1996	Prague	Czech Republic	Sportovní hala	The Verve Pipe
December 15, 1996	Prague	Czech Republic	Sportovní hala	The Verve Pipe
December 16, 1996	Vienna	Austria	Libro Music Hall	The Verve Pipe
December 18, 1996	Milan	Italy	Filaforum	The Verve Pipe
December 19, 1996	Zürich	Switzerland	Hallenstadion	The Verve Pipe
December 20, 1996	Stuttgart	Germany	Schleyerhalle	Die Ärzte
December 21, 1996	Dortmund	Germany	Westfalenhalle	Die Ärzte
December 28, 1996	Worcester	United States	Worcester Centrum	The 4th Floor
December 29, 1996	Uniondale	United States	Nassau Veterans Memorial Coliseum	The 4th Floor
December 30, 1996	Hartford	United States	Hartford Civic Center	The 4th Floor
December 31, 1996	East Rutherford	United States	Continental Airlines Arena	The 4th Floor

List of 1997 concerts, showing date, city, country, venue, and opening acts
Date	City	Country	Venue	Opening Act(s)
January 18, 1997	Tokyo	Japan	Tokyo Dome	—N/a
January 20, 1997	Nagoya	Japan	Nagoya Rainbow Hall	—N/a
January 21, 1997	Osaka	Japan	Osaka Castle Hall	—N/a
January 22, 1997	Osaka	Japan	Osaka Castle Hall	—N/a
January 24, 1997	Fukuoka	Japan	Kokusai Center	—N/a
January 25, 1997	Hiroshima	Japan	Hiroshima Sun Plaza	—N/a
January 31, 1997	Auckland	New Zealand	The Supertop	The Exponents
February 3, 1997	Brisbane	Australia	Brisbane Entertainment Centre	Custard
February 5, 1997	Sydney	Australia	Sydney Entertainment Centre	Fireballs
February 6, 1997	Sydney	Australia	Sydney Entertainment Centre	The Screaming Jets
February 9, 1997	Perth	Australia	Burswood Dome	Non-Intentional Lifeform
February 11, 1997	Adelaide	Australia	Memorial Drive Tennis Centre	Fireballs
February 13, 1997	Melbourne	Australia	Centre Court	Fireballs
February 14, 1997	Melbourne	Australia	Centre Court	The Fauves
February 15, 1997	Melbourne	Australia	Centre Court	Snout
March 7, 1997	Mexico City	Mexico	Palacio de los Deportes	Pantera
March 8, 1997	Mexico City	Mexico	Palacio de los Deportes	Pantera
March 9, 1997	Mexico City	Mexico	Palacio de los Deportes	Pantera
March 11, 1997	Santiago	Chile	Velodromo del Estadio Nacional	Pantera
March 14, 1997	Buenos Aires	Argentina	River Plate Stadium	Pantera
March 21, 1997	New Haven	United States	New Haven Coliseum	Powerman 5000
March 22, 1997	Springfield	United States	Springfield Civic Center	Powerman 5000
March 23, 1997	Providence	United States	Providence Civic Center	Powerman 5000
March 25, 1997	Portland	United States	Cumberland County Civic Center	Powerman 5000
March 27, 1997	Wheeling	United States	Wheeling Civic Center	Powerman 5000
March 28, 1997	Hamilton	Canada	Copps Coliseum	Glueleg
March 29, 1997	University Park	United States	Bryce Jordan Center	Powerman 5000
March 31, 1997	Charleston	United States	Charleston Civic Center	Powerman 5000
April 1, 1997	Baltimore	United States	Baltimore Arena	Powerman 5000
April 2, 1997	Richmond	United States	Richmond Coliseum	Powerman 5000
April 4, 1997	Chapel Hill	United States	Dean Smith Center	Powerman 5000
April 5, 1997	Columbus	United States	Columbus Civic Center	Powerman 5000
April 6, 1997	Nashville	United States	Nashville Arena	Powerman 5000
April 8, 1997	Evansville	United States	Roberts Municipal Stadium	D Generation
April 9, 1997	Fort Wayne	United States	Allen County War Memorial Coliseum	D Generation
April 10, 1997	Grand Rapids	United States	Van Andel Arena	Outhouse
April 12, 1997	Toledo	United States	John F. Savage Hall	Outhouse
April 13, 1997	Peoria	United States	Peoria Civic Center	Outhouse
April 15, 1997	St. Louis	United States	Kiel Center	Outhouse
April 16, 1997	Topeka	United States	Landon Arena	Outhouse
April 18, 1997	Sioux Falls	United States	Sioux Falls Arena	Outhouse
April 19, 1997	Ames	United States	Hilton Coliseum	Outhouse
April 20, 1997	Cedar Rapids	United States	Five Seasons Center	Outhouse
April 22, 1997	Saint Paul	United States	St. Paul Civic Center	Outhouse
April 23, 1997	Madison	United States	Dane County Expo Coliseum	Outhouse
April 25, 1997	Mankato	United States	Mankato Civic Center	Outhouse
April 26, 1997	Fargo	United States	Fargodome	Outhouse
April 27, 1997	Bismark	United States	Bismarck Civic Center	Outhouse
April 29, 1997	Winnipeg	Canada	Winnipeg Arena	Econoline Crush
April 30, 1997	Winnipeg	Canada	Winnipeg Arena	Econoline Crush
May 1, 1997	Saskatoon	Canada	Saskatchewan Place	Econoline Crush
May 2, 1997	Edmonton	Canada	Edmonton Coliseum	Econoline Crush
May 3, 1997	Calgary	Canada	Canadian Airlines Saddledome	Econoline Crush
May 5, 1997	Seattle	United States	KeyArena	Sugar Ray
May 6, 1997	Vancouver	Canada	General Motors Place	Econoline Crush
May 16, 1997	Nuremberg	Germany	Rock im Park	—N/a
May 18, 1997	Nürburgring	Germany	Rock am Ring	—N/a
May 21, 1997	Berlin	Germany	Waldbühne	Otto Waalkes
May 22, 1997	Leipzig	Germany	Messehalle	Die Ärzte
May 24, 1997	Hamburg	Germany	Trabrennbahn Bahrenfeld	Die Ärzte
May 29, 1997	Wels	Austria	Messegelände	Moonspell; Naked Lunch; Alkbottle; Sextiger
May 31, 1997	Imst	Austria	Skiarena Imst	Moonspell; Naked Lunch
June 1, 1997	Zürich	Switzerland	Hallenstadion	Sideburn
June 4, 1997	Belgrade	Yugoslavia	Sajam Hall 1	Die Ärzte; Moonspell
June 5, 1997	Budapest	Hungary	Petőfi Csarnok	Warpigs; Irigy Hónaljmirigy
June 7, 1997	Prague	Czech Republic	Stadion Juliska	Waltari; Lut Pes; Satisfucktion
June 10, 1997	Ghent	Belgium	Flanders Expo Arena	Uncle Meat
June 11, 1997	Utrecht	Netherlands	Prins Van Oranjehal	Channel Zero
June 14, 1997	Stockholm	Sweden	Stockholms Stadion	The Hellacopters; Fungus
June 15, 1997	Stockholm	Sweden	Stockholms Stadion	The Hellacopters; Fungus
June 17, 1997	Helsinki	Finland	Hartwall Areena	The Hellacopters
June 19, 1997	Oslo	Norway	Oslo Spektrum	The Hellacopters
June 21, 1997	Copenhagen	Denmark	Valby Idrætspark	Passion Orange; Strawberry Slaughterhouse
June 25, 1997	Madrid	Spain	Palacio de los Deportes	El Fantastico Hombre Bala
June 26, 1997	Zaragoza	Spain	Plaza de Toros de Zaragoza	El Fantastico Hombre Bala
June 30, 1997	Barcelona	Spain	Palau dels Esports de Barcelona	El Fantastico Hombre Bala
July 2, 1997	Geneva	Switzerland	SEG Geneva Arena	Core
July 5, 1997	London	England	Finsbury Park	Rage Against the Machine; Skunk Anansie; Thunder; L7; 3 Colours Red

=== Postponed and cancelled dates ===
Date	City	Venue	Reasoning
September 4, 1996	Boise	BSU Pavilion	Cancelled to appear on the MTV Video Music Awards.
November 28, 1996	Madrid	Palacio de los Deportes	Cancelled due to the French Road Transport Strike
November 29, 1996	Zaragoza	Sala Multiusos	Cancelled due to the French Road Transport Strike
January 28, 1997	Yokohama	Yokohama Arena	Cancelled due to low ticket sales
May 7, 1997	Yakima	Yakima SunDome	Cancelled due to needing more rehearsal time for the European tour
May 9, 1997	Reno	Lawlor Events Center	Cancelled due to needing more rehearsal time for the European tour
May 10, 1997	San Francisco	Cow Palace	Cancelled due to needing more rehearsal time for the European tour
May 26, 1997	Warsaw	Stadion Gwardia	Cancelled due to low ticket sales
June 28, 1997	Lisbon	Estadio Nacional	Cancelled due to low ticket sales

=== Box office score data ===
List of box office score data with date, city, venue, attendance, gross, references
Date	City	Venue	Attendance	Gross	Ref(s)
June 28, 1996	Detroit	Tiger Stadium	39,867 / 39,867	$1,561,953	
June 30, 1996	Louisville	Freedom Hall Coliseum	15,891 / 15,891	$473,440	
July 2, 1996	St. Louis	Kiel Center	16,310 / 16,310	$598,337	
July 9, 1996	New Orleans	Louisiana Superdome	16,308 / 16,308	$513,665	
July 25–28, 1996	New York City	Madison Square Garden	58,820 / 58,820	$3,267,670	
August 23–25, 1996	Inglewood	The Forum	40,919 / 40,919	$1,601,705	
September 11, 1996	Oklahoma City	Myriad Arena	9,423 / 10,343	$334,630	
September 20, 1996	St. Petersburg	ThunderDome	14,328 / 14,328	$532,881	
September 25, 1996	Columbia	Coliseum	9,034 / 9,034	$326,800	
September 28, 1996	Greensboro	Coliseum	16,100 / 16,100	$547,293	
October 1–2, 1996	Atlanta	Omni	23,798 / 26,336	$868,627	
October 16–17, 1996	Auburn Hills	Palace of Auburn Hills	27,267 / 27,267	$1,183,635	
October 18, 1996	Lexington	Rupp Arena	11,740 / 14,000	$424,647	
October 20, 1996	Cleveland	Gund Arena	17,037 / 17,037	$554,399	
October 23–24, 1996	Omaha	Civic Auditorium	21,332 / 21,332	$629,294	
October 31, 1996	Irvine	Irvine Meadows Amphitheatre	22,550 / 30,832	$801,744	
November 2, 1996	Las Vegas	MGM Grand Garden	13,030 / 13,030	$587,330	
November 5, 1996	Austin	Frank Erwin Center	7,929 / 13,506	$272,699	
December 29, 1996	Uniondale	Nassau Veterans Memorial Coliseum	13,972 / 14,550	$764,030	
December 31, 1996	East Rutherford	Continental Airlines Arena	13,253 / 15,310	$725,655	
March 7–9, 1997	Mexico City	Sports Palace	55,800 / 55,800	$1,183,988	
March 23, 1997	Providence	Civic Center	10,818 / 10,818	$377,448	
April 6, 1997	Nashville	Arena	15,267 / 15,267	$487,008	
April 20, 1997	Cedar Rapids	Five Seasons Center	9,084 / 9,084	$313,398	

== Personnel ==
- Paul Stanley – vocals, rhythm guitar
- Gene Simmons – vocals, bass
- Peter Criss – drums, vocals
- Ace Frehley – lead guitar, vocals

Additional musician

- Ed Kanon – drums, drum technician

== See also ==
- List of highest-grossing concert tours
