= Psycho Circus (song) =

1998 single by Kiss

Single by Kiss

from the album Psycho Circus
- Released: August 1998
- Studio: A&M, One on One (Los Angeles)
- Genre: Heavy metal
- Length: 5:30
- Label: Mercury
- Songwriters: Paul Stanley, Curt Cuomo
- Producer: Bruce Fairbairn

Kiss singles chronology
"Jungle" (1997)	"Psycho Circus" (1998)	"We Are One" / "Psycho Circus" (1998)

Music video
- "Psycho Circus" on YouTube

"Psycho Circus" is a song by the American hard rock band Kiss. It is the title track from their 18th studio album, Psycho Circus (1998). The single reached number one on the US Billboard Mainstream Rock Tracks chart and became a top-10 hit in Canada, Norway, and Sweden. Although MTV hardly played the song's music video, the VHS home video proved to be a big seller, eventually going platinum in the United States.

== Song information ==
"Psycho Circus" was written by guitarist/vocalist Paul Stanley and Curt Cuomo specifically to fit the theme of the Psycho Circus Tour and album. According to producer Bruce Fairbairn, "We didn't have an opener for the record. We didn't have anything that was going to start things off. And [Paul] just looked at me and said, 'check this. This is it...' We both sat there and looked at each other and started to laugh. Because that was it"

Four different versions of the single exist, featuring a different member of the band pictured on the cover.

As a single, the song became the band's first number-one hit on the US Billboard Mainstream Rock Tracks chart. It also entered the top 10 in Canada, Norway, and Sweden and peaked at number 22 in Australia.

The song would open sets for the band on the Psycho Circus Tour to support the album, and was performed on Kiss's live album Kiss Symphony: Alive IV in 2003. "Psycho Circus" returned to setlist during the 2010s, on both the Monster World Tour and The KISS 40th Anniversary World Tour.

"Psycho Circus" was nominated for a Grammy Award in 1999 for Best Hard Rock Performance, losing out to Jimmy Page and Robert Plant's "Most High".

== Music video ==
A music video was made to promote the single, which was made in the same 3-D theme as the album and tour, and was directed by James J. Hurlburt and produced by Doc McGhee and Eddie Vasker. Although the video was generally ignored by MTV, it won a 1998 Metal Edge Readers' Choice Award for Video of the Year.

To compensate for the lack of MTV airplay the band released the video on VHS complete with 3-D glasses. In addition to "Psycho Circus" the included CD single features Ace Frehley's "In Your Face", a song not available elsewhere in North America.

The video was certified Platinum in the US.

== Personnel ==
- Paul Stanley – lead vocals, rhythm guitar
- Tommy Thayer – lead guitar
- Bruce Kulick – bass guitar, backing vocals
- Kevin Valentine – drums

== Charts ==
=== Weekly charts ===
Chart (1998)	Peak position
Australia (ARIA)	22
Canada Top Singles (RPM)	10
Canada Rock/Alternative (RPM)	6
Netherlands (Single Top 100)	98
Norway (VG-lista)	8
Sweden (Sverigetopplistan)	4
US Mainstream Rock (Billboard)	1

=== Year-end charts ===
Chart (1998)	Position
Canada Rock/Alternative (RPM)	40
US Mainstream Rock Tracks (Billboard)	24

== Certifications ==
Region	Certification	Certified units/sales
Sweden (GLF)	Gold	15,000^{^}
^{^} Shipments figures based on certification alone.
