= Subway Serenade =

Studio album by Looking Glass
- Released: June 1973
- Recorded: Regent Sound Studios, New York City, New York; Atlantic Studios
- Genre: Pop
- Length: 34:39
- Label: Epic
- Producer: Arif Mardin

Looking Glass chronology
Looking Glass (1972)	Subway Serenade (1973)	Highway to Hollywood (1974)

Singles from Subway Serenade
- 1. "Jimmy Loves Mary-Anne" / "Wooly Eyes" Released: July 1973; 2. "Who's Gonna Sing My Rock 'N' Roll Song" / "Sweet Somethin'" Released: 1973

Subway Serenade was the second and final album released by the band Looking Glass. It contained their second charting single, "Jimmy Loves Mary-Anne". Following the departure of vocalist Elliot Lurie to pursue a solo career, the band would release one final single called "Highway to Hollywood" (written by keyboardist Larry Gonsky) under the slightly altered name of "Lookinglass" in 1974 before drastically reforming their lineup and style into the heavy metal/power pop group Starz.

== Track listing ==
Side one
No.	Title	Writer(s)	Lead Vocals	Length
1.	"Jimmy Loves Mary-Anne"	Elliot Lurie	Lurie	3:37
2.	"City Lady"	Lurie	Lurie	3:22
3.	"For Skipper"	Pieter Sweval	Sweval	3:16
4.	"Sweet Somethin'"	Lurie	Lurie	2:48
5.	"Who's Gonna Sing My Rock 'N' Roll Song"	Larry Gonsky, Nancy Nalence	Sweval	3:49

Side two
No.	Title	Writer(s)	Lead Vocals	Length
6.	"Are You Dreamin' (Money In My Pockets)"	Lurie, Gonsky	Lurie	2:58
7.	"Rainbow Man"	Sweval	Sweval	3:40
8.	"Wait"	Lurie	Lurie	2:51
9.	"Sweet Jeremiah"	Sweval	Sweval	3:17
10.	"Wooly Eyes"	Gonksy, Nalence	Sweval	4:35

== Personnel ==
Looking Glass

- Elliot Lurie - Guitars, lead vocals
- Pieter "Piet" Sweval - Bass, lead vocals, harp
- Larry Gonsky - Keyboards, vocals
- Jeff Grob (credited as Joe Dube) - drums and percussion, traps

Additional personnel

- Maxine Dixon - Additional background vocals
- Nancy Nalence - Additional background vocals
- Nancy Farrell - Additional background vocals
- Steve von Schreiber - Additional background vocals
- Ralph MacDonald - Conga and percussion on "Jimmy Loves Mary-Anne" and "City Lady"
- Seldon Powell - Saxophone on "Sweet Jeremiah"
- Arif Mardin - Horns and strings arrangements
- Peggy Byrnes - Special Thanks
- Don Ellis - Special Thanks
- James Greene - Engineer
- Bill Scruggs - Engineer
- Ken Robertson - Engineer
- Lew Hahn - Audio
- Gene Paul - Audio
- Chappell & Co. - Sole selling agent

All songs published by Spruce Run/EvieMusic Co. ASCAP
