= Starz (band) =

American rock band

- The group's logo

Background information
- Origin: Lodi, New Jersey, U.S.
- Genres: Hard rock, power pop, heavy metal
- Years active: 1975–1979, 1980, 1990–1992, 2003–present
- Label: Capitol Records
- Members: Richie Ranno; Joe X. Dube; Doug Palmer; Jason Draven; Chris Tristram
- Past members: Michael Lee Smith; Brendan Harkin; Pieter Sweval; Orville Davis; Doug Madick; Alex Kane; Bobby Messano

Starz is an American hard rock and power pop band from New Jersey. Despite a lack of major commercial success, the band has a lasting cult following and has been cited as a major influence by bands such as Mötley Crüe, Poison, Bon Jovi, and Twisted Sister.

== History ==
Starz descended from the early 1970s pop band Looking Glass, which had the No. 1 hit single "Brandy (You're a Fine Girl)" in the summer of 1972.

After lead singer Elliot Lurie left Looking Glass in 1974, the three remaining members—keyboardist Larry Gonsky, bassist Pieter Sweval, and drummer Jeff Grob (who adopted the stage name Joe X. Dube)—teamed up with vocalist Michael Lee Smith and guitarist Brendan Harkin to continue the band, eventually changing the name to Fallen Angels.

In September 1975, they were joined by former Stories guitarist Richie Ranno. After keyboardist Gonsky separated from the group, they decided to rebrand and pursue a more heavy metal direction.

The band was trying to decide on a new name when their manager noticed the star necklace Ranno was wearing, in addition to his guitar with stars on it. When he suggested the name "Starz", the band was not immediately on board with the idea. However, when the band returned to the studio the following day, their manager presented them with a rough sketch of the current (STARZ) logo, which he had drawn on a napkin. Upon seeing the logo sketch, the band all agreed it was perfect, and the band was officially rebranded as Starz.

Kiss manager Bill Aucoin was introduced to STARZ via his right-hand man Sean Delaney, who had previously befriended Sweval. Aucoin began representing Starz in late 1975, helping them to get signed to Capitol Records in early 1976.

The first self-titled Starz album was released on June 21, 1976, and contained their first single, "(She's Just A) Fallen Angel". The album also contained a controversial track in the song "Pull the Plug", about the parents of Karen Ann Quinlan ending their comatose daughter's life support.

Their first major hit single, "Cherry Baby", in the spring of 1977 came from their second album, Violation, produced by Jack Douglas of Aerosmith fame. Douglas produced their first two studio albums: Starz and Violation.

Their third studio album, the self-produced Attention Shoppers!, was more in the vein of power pop than heavy metal and featured a Cheap Trick influence in songs such as "X-Ray Spex", and "Hold on to the Night".

Harkin and Sweval were asked to leave the band after Attention Shoppers!, reportedly since they wanted to continue in that album's musical direction, while the others favored a return to the harder sound of their first two albums.

On their fourth, and final, studio album on the Capitol label, Coliseum Rock, produced by The Guess Who producer Jack Richardson, Harkin and Sweval were replaced by Bobby Messano on guitar and Orville Davis on bass, respectively. Previously, Davis was the bassist for the Southern rock band Hydra, which released multiple albums in the mid-1970s. His contributions can be heard on the first two LP's: 1974's Hydra and 1975's Land of Money. After leaving Hydra, Davis joined REX, a hard rock band.

After being dropped by Capitol and manager Aucoin, Starz split up in mid 1979. Dube and Ranno put together a trio with bassist Peter Scance called Hard Core. In late 1980 Starz reunited with a lineup of Smith, Ranno, Harkin, Davis, with Doug Madick on drums. The group played clubs up and down the East Coast in what amounted to a farewell tour.

In 1981 Smith, Ranno, Madick, and Scance regrouped and rebranded as Hellcats. Hellcats recorded five new songs, released as an EP on the independent label Radio Records in 1982.

In the mid-1980s, Ranno shifted the lineup of Hellcats, this time featuring Perry Jones on lead vocals. They produced and released an album in 1987 on the King Klassic record label, as well as a four-track EP in 1988.

Brian Slagel of Metal Blade Records contacted Ranno in 1989, telling him of his longtime admiration of the band and asked if Ranno held the rights to any of the band's material.

Ranno stated he owned two unreleased live shows and allowed Metal Blade to compile them as Live in Action, which contained cuts from a 1976 Cleveland show and a 1978 radio promotional show in Louisville, Kentucky. The release of Live in Action was a precursor to the 1990 release of the four Starz studio albums on compact disc, as the inaugural releases by Metal Blade's "Classics" imprint.

The albums have been subsequently re-released on CD (by other labels and the band themselves), with bonus tracks primarily composed of material from the band's days as Fallen Angels, as well as a few songs from the 1992 reunion (independent) album, Requiem.

Pieter Sweval died of complications from AIDS on January 23, 1990.

Later that year, Smith and Harkin went to New York to join Ranno in writing and recording five new songs. Madick played drums on the new project, as Dube had left the music business to work as an architect. Harkin replaced the late Sweval on bass.

The songs were released (with some live tracks, plus other previously written, yet unreleased songs) on their own label, Drastic CD, in 1992 as the aforementioned Requiem. After this, Ranno continued on his own with the Richie Ranno Group, which put out a CD (RRG) in 1996.

Ranno was approached in 2003 by a British promoter who wanted to bring STARZ over to the UK. This particular UK tour never materialized; however, the surviving original members (Smith, Ranno, Harkin, and Dube) regrouped that same year for a number of successful club dates, culminating in the two-day, 2005 "Starzfest" in Teaneck, New Jersey, which featured the entire band joined by Messano and Davis. They performed the studio album catalog in their entirety, including songs which had never previously been performed live. Two concerts in California were also performed in late 2005, one recorded for a television special.

In addition, a show recorded in Cleveland, Ohio, in 2004 was released on CD in late 2006. The Ohio show was performed as a four piece, as Harkin had missed his flight to Cleveland. In 2005, Messano once again replaced Harkin as the second-guitarist. Ranno also performed shows on the East Coast with Dube as "Richie Ranno's All-Stars".

Former Ted Nugent drummer Cliff Davies filled in for Dube at a Starz show in San Francisco, California, in October 2007. For additional shows in California in April 2008, Billy Howe filled in on guitar for Messano. Former Kiss guitarist Bruce Kulick did the honors at that year's Kiss Convention on May 3 in Secaucus, New Jersey.

Alex Kane took over the second guitar slot in 2013. Kane played guitar and Ginger Wildheart subbed on bass for a one-night-only gig in the UK at The Garage, London in London's Highbury section on December 18, 2013. The band released privately-made DVDs of the show, some copies signed on the cover by Ranno.

Starz went back out on tour in 2019, co-headlining with Angel on East Coast (April) and Midwest (May) show dates. Starz and Angel were supporting acts for Ace Frehley on May 4, 2019, at Chesterfield Amphitheater in St. Louis County, Missouri. The St. Louis show kicked off the Midwest leg of the 2019 tour.

== Influence ==
Despite lack of major commercial success, Starz has created a significant and enduring legacy. Several 1980s glam metal artists, including Poison, Jon Bon Jovi of Bon Jovi, Nikki Sixx of Mötley Crüe, Sebastian Bach of Skid Row, Lars Ulrich of Metallica, and Twisted Sister cite Starz as a primary influence. Ginger of the Wildhearts has also cited Starz as an important influence, including them in the lyrics to the song "29x The Pain (I see Starz)". Kerrang! magazine included the first two Starz albums on their list of the most important heavy metal albums of all time.

== Discography ==
=== Studio albums ===
Year	Album	US	RIAA Certification	Label
1976	Starz	123	-	Capitol
1977	Violation	89	-	Capitol
1978	Attention Shoppers!	105	-	Capitol
1978	Coliseum Rock	-	-	Capitol
1992	Requiem	-	-	Drastic CD
2000	Back In The Day	-	-	Drastic CD

=== Singles ===
Year	Single	Chart positions		
Year	Single	US Hot 100	US Main Rock	UK
1975	"(Just Like) Romeo & Juliet" (as Fallen Angels)	106	-	-
1977	"(She's Just A) Fallen Angel"	95	-	-
1977	"Cherry Baby"	33	-	-
1977	"Sing It, Shout It"	66	-	-
1978	"(Any Way That You Want It) I'll Be There"	79	-	-
1978	"Hold On to the Night"	78	-	-
1978	"So Young, So Bad"	81	-	-

=== Live albums ===
- Live At Municipal Auditorium, Louisville, March 30, 1978 (1978)
- Live In America (1983)
- Live In Canada (1985)
- Live in Action (1989) (Contains the 1978 live album + extra live recordings)
- Greatest Hits Live (1999)
- Double Live (2006)
- Live at the Agora (Starz album)| 1978]] (2020) Vinyl Issue by Renaissance Records
- Live in Cleveland (Starz album)| 1976]] (2020) Vinyl Issue by Renaissance Records

=== Compilation albums ===
- Brightest Starz (1985) on Heavy Metal America records (contains a collection of songs from "Starz," "Violation," "Attention Shoppers!" and "Coliseum Rock")
- Do It with the Lights On (1987) Contains Previously Unreleased Material
- Brightest Starz Anthology (2000) on Renaissance Records (CD)
- Live at the Agora 1978 (2021) on Renaissance Records (CD)
- Live at the Agora 1978 (2021) on Renaissance Records (LP)
