= Strange Spirits =

Studio album by Skatt Bros.
- Released: November 6, 1979
- Recorded: Phase One Recording Studios, Ltd., Toronto, Ontario; 1979
- Genre: Rock, disco
- Length: 34:17
- Label: Casablanca
- Producer: Ian Guenther and Willi Morrison

Skatt Bros. chronology
Strange Spirits (1979)	Rico and the Ravens (1981)

Strange Spirits is a 1979 album by the Skatt Brothers.

Casablanca supported this release with a single release in the U.S. of "Dancin' for the Man" backed with "Walk the Night." A video was also created by Polygram Records (Australia) for "Life at the Outpost," which was deemed a total misrepresentation of the Skatt Bros, as it contained none of the band members, but actors performing choreography. Nonetheless, the song was released as a single in other markets, notably in Australia, where it was backed with "Midnight Companion" and reached gold record status. The Kiss connections continue on this album, apart from the obvious Sean Delaney one: a Kiss pinball machine features on the album's rear cover photograph.

== Release details ==
In 2010, European music company Premium Series reissued Strange Spirits with a bonus track: Walk the Night (12 inch version). The reissue claimed to be "24 Bit Digitally Remastered From Original Master Tapes".

== Track listing ==
Side one
No.	Title	Writer(s)	Length
1.	"Dancin' For the Man"	Sean Delaney	3:46
2.	"Fear of Flying"	Willi Morrison	3:44
3.	"Midnight Companion"	Delaney, Pieter Sweval	3:25
4.	"Walk the Night"	David Andez, Richie Fontana	3:53

Side two
No.	Title	Writer(s)	Length
1.	"Strange Spirits"	Pieter Sweval	4:21
2.	"Someone's Taken My Baby"	Delaney, Sweval, Richard Martin-Ross	4:29
3.	"Life at the Outpost"	Delaney, Sweval	4:56
4.	"Old Enough"	Delaney, Sweval	5:43

=== 2010 bonus track ===
No.	Title	Writer(s)	Length
4.	"Walk The Night" (extended version)	David Andez, Richie Fontana	5:21

== Charts ==
Chart (1980)	Peak Position
Australian (Kent Music Report)	71

== Personnel ==
- Sean Delaney - Keyboards
- Pieter Sweval - Bass
- Richard Martin-Ross - Guitar
- David Andez - Lead Guitar
- Richie Fontana - Drums
- Craig Krampf - Drums

== Recording ==
Auxiliary musicians:

- Brian Russell
- Michael Toles
- Errol Thomas
- Carl Marsh
- Barry Keane

Recorded at: Phase One Recording Studios Limited, Toronto, Ontario, Canada

- First Engineer: George Semkiw
- Assistant Engineers: Mick Walsh, Jeff Stobbs, Robin Brouwers
- Mastered at Sterling Sound by George Marino
- Art Direction: Phyllis Chotin
- Design: Gribbitt!
- Photography: Dean Tokuno
