= Attention Shoppers =

Attention Shoppers may refer to:

- Attention Shoppers!, an album by Starz
- Attention Shoppers, an album by Nero's Day at Disneyland
- "Attention Shoppers" (Flashpoint), an episode of Flashpoint
- Attention Shoppers (film), a 2000 film starring Nestor Carbonell
- "Attention Shoppers", a short story by Steven Brust

== See also ==
- "Attention Kmart shoppers", a phrase associated with the discount retail chain Kmart
