= Mary Ellis grave =

Gravesite in Middlesex County, New Jersey, US

Coordinates: 40°29′21.27″N 74°24′59.53″W

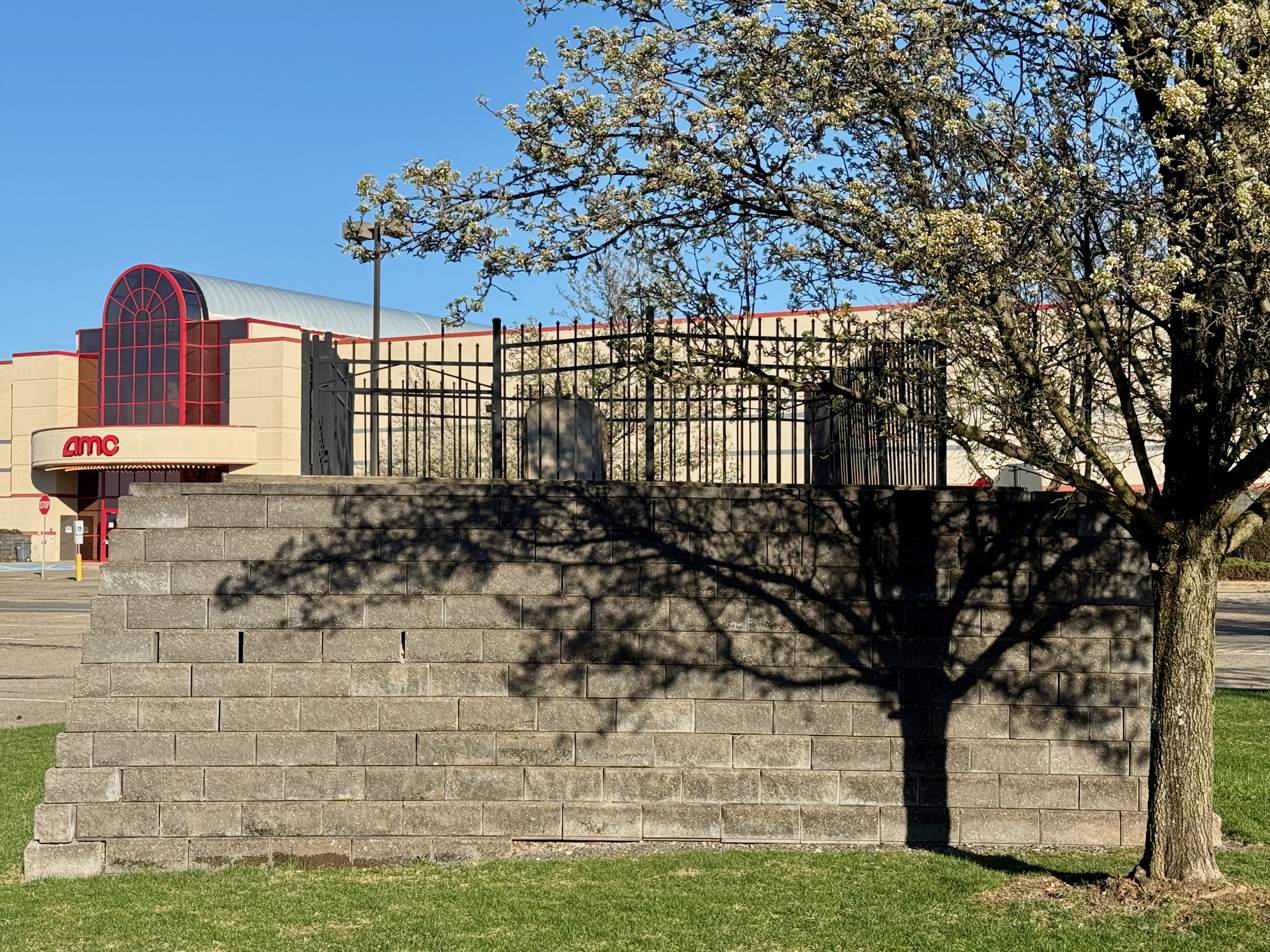
Mary Ellis Burial Site behind the AMC Theatre

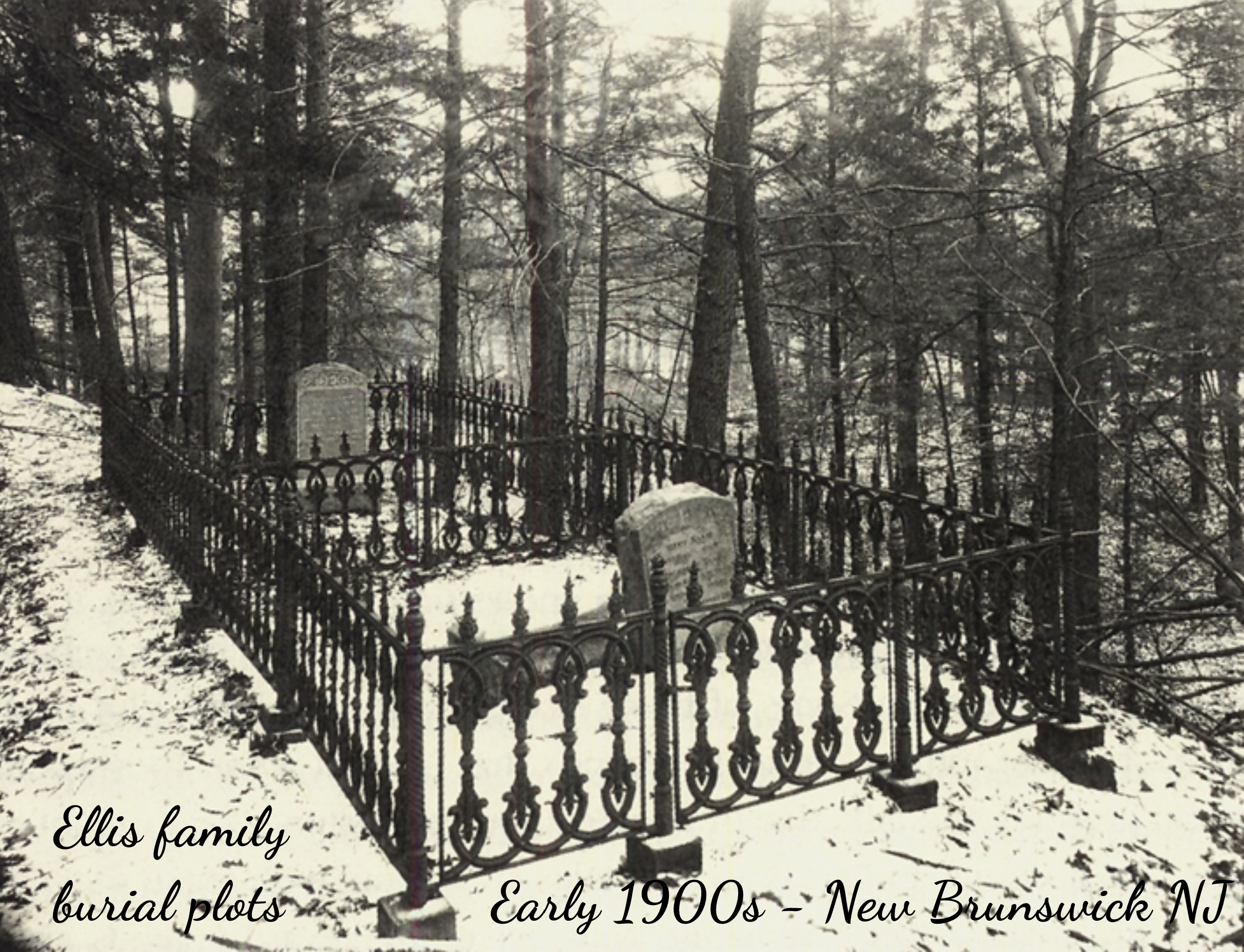
Mary Ellis family burial plots in the early 1900s.

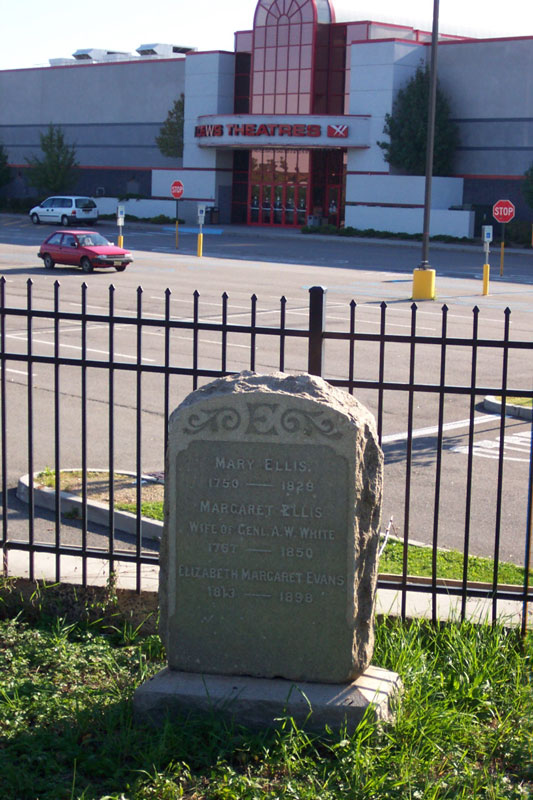
Grave of Mary Ellis in 2003

The Mary Ellis grave is a grave now located behind an AMC Theatre on U.S. Route 1 in New Brunswick, Middlesex County, New Jersey, United States. The granite gravestone is located on a 7-foot (2.1 m) high stonework platform surrounded by the back parking lot. Seven relatives are also buried and marked on the grave itself.

== Historical background ==
Mary Ellis (1750–1828) was a property owner and feminist in New Brunswick, New Jersey. A native of South Carolina, she was noted to vote in city elections before the right for women to vote was created in New Jersey. Living on Livingston Avenue, Ellis maintained a garden on her property until a local politician, James Schureman, took the land to build a street on it. In response, she posted a sign on the new Schureman Street calling it "Oppression Street". Local historians say that around 1813, Ellis moved from downtown New Brunswick to what was then a secluded area known as Mount Hemlock, which overlooked the Raritan River, and lived there until her death. A niece of Ellis respected her request to be buried on the land on which she lived, overlooking the Raritan River, in the Evans family plot there.

According to an oral legend, Ellis was seduced by a sea captain who vowed to return to marry her. He never returned, and she would come to the spot where her grave now stands, each day, to look for his ship on the Raritan River. However, no first-hand or contemporary accounts of such a relationship exist, and local historians have doubted the truth of this story, noting Ellis as a person who would not waste that kind of time.

== Development of the area ==
By June 1956, the present surviving gravestone had been knocked over into the grounds below, and remained in that location for several years. John E. Burke, who had purchased the property in 1943 and then ran the Raritan Playland Amusement Park on the site, wanted to relocate the graves and gravestone, but abandoned this plan once he learned that he would be required to contact and obtain written permission from the families of all those buried there before such a move would be permitted.

In 1965, with the construction of the Great Eastern Department Store on the site of her former residence, the company constructed a protective wall along the burial site and the toppled gravestone. This new construction created a 20-foot (6.1 m) pit in the parking lot, which soon attracted debris and littering. However, by 1980, Ray Travis and the son of Burke, operating the site as the Route 1 Flea Market since 1975, felt it was time to replace the concrete pit with dirt and move the granite gravestone to ground level. Several local historians were upset by the decision to do this as they were unaware that the move was meant to help preserve, not destroy, the graves. Travis spent more than $1,000 (1980 USD) for eleven truckloads of dirt in order to fill in the fenced grave pit and that he had also planned to landscape the area.

On August 16, 1980, a float was run during the Raritan River Festival, commemorating the impact of Mary Ellis in New Brunswick history. Once the Route 1 Flea Market was razed and replaced with a Loews Theatre, the parking lot was re-graded, resulting in the gravestone towering over the parking lot.

In 2005, Jack Morris, of Edgewood Properties, was seeking to redevelop the area and move the graves nearer to the river.

== Mary Ellis in popular culture ==
The band Looking Glass, created of students at Rutgers University, wrote their 1972 song "Brandy (You're a Fine Girl)" with a story similar to Ellis' in terms of a bartender who finds someone she loves but the sailor preferring the sea as his true love. However, the members of the band denied there was any connection between the Ellis story and the song's lyrics.

== Burials in the plot ==
- Mildred Moody (1746–1816), wife of Thomas Evans
- Mary Ellis (1750–1828)
- Margaret Ellis (1767–1850) who married Anthony Walton White (1750–1803), general of the United States Army
- Eliza Mary White (1792–1861), daughter of the above, who married Thomas M. Evans and was the mother of Walton Evans
- Thomas M. Evans (1790–1820)
- Elizabeth Margaret Evans (1813–1898)
- Isabella Johanna Evans (1815–1901)
