= Greatest Hits Live (Starz album) =

Starz

Live album by Starz
- Released: November 9, 2004
- Genre: Hard rock, heavy metal, power pop
- Length: 71:15
- Label: Mvd Visual
- Producer: Starz, Gary Borress

Starz chronology
Live in Action (1989)	Starz (2004)

Professional ratings
Review scores
Source	Rating
Allmusic	4/5 stars

Greatest Hits live is the sixth album and second live album by the rock band Starz. The album was released in 2004 and 15 years after Live in Action was released.

== Track listing ==
No.	Title	Length
1.	"Fallen Angel"	3:52
2.	"Tear it Down"	3:14
3.	"Live Wire"	4:16
4.	"Monkey Business"	2:46
5.	"Detroit Girls"	4:57
6.	"Night Crawler"	4:38
7.	"Pull the Plug"	7:56
8.	"Boys in Action"	8:09
9.	"She"	3:25
10.	"Any Way That You Want It"	4:20
11.	"Cherry Baby"	4:08
12.	"Rock Six Times"	4:32
13.	"Coliseum Rock"	2:54
14.	"It's a Riot"	3:41
15.	"Subway Terror"	4:07
16.	"Take Me"	4:20

== Personnel ==
Band members

- Michael Lee Smith - vocals
- Richie Ranno - guitar
- Brendan Harkin - guitar
- Pieter "Pete" Sweval - bass
- Joe X. Dubé - drums
