= Starz (Starz album) =

Studio album by Starz
- Released: June 21, 1976
- Recorded: 1976
- Studio: Record Plant, New York City
- Genre: Rock and roll, arena rock
- Length: 39:11
- Label: Capitol
- Producer: Jack Douglas

Starz chronology
Starz (1976)	Violation (1977)

Starz is the debut studio album by the American hard rock band Starz. The album was released on June 21, 1976, on Capitol Records and produced by Jack Douglas (best known for his work with the American hard rock band Aerosmith).

The song "Pull the Plug" caused some controversy, because it is about a man disconnecting his comatose wife's life support.

== Reception ==
Professional ratings
Review scores
Source	Rating
AllMusic	3/5 stars
Collector's Guide to Heavy Metal	7/10

AllMusic's Rob Theakston described Starz as "a simple, catchy, riff-driven album from start to finish", which failed in promoting the band to the level of arena rock stars like Aerosmith and Kiss; he judged the album "a mediocre debut, to be sure, and definitely not the release for casual fans to introduce themselves to the group." Canadian journalist Martin Popoff commented on the lack of success of Starz, writing that it "was perceived as a happy collection of harmless, corporate-vetted, summertime rock 'n' roll, marketed heavily and unfairly as state-of-the-art American hard rock", but concluded that the album aged quite well and is a good representation of "rock 'n' roll's friendlier, more relaxed, more optimistic eras."

== Track listing ==
Side one
No.	Title	Writer(s)	Length
1.	"Detroit Girls"	Richie Ranno, Michael Lee Smith, Piet Sweval	4:05
2.	"Live Wire"	Ranno, Smith, Sweval	3:23
3.	"Tear It Down"	Sweval	3:13
4.	"Boys in Action"	Ranno, Smith, Sweval, Brendan Harkin	5:37
5.	"(She's Just a) Fallen Angel"	Ranno, Smith, Sweval, Harkin, Sean Delaney, Joe X. Dube	3:35

Side two
No.	Title	Writer(s)	Length
6.	"Monkey Business"	Harkin, Smith, Sweval, Delaney	2:52
7.	"Night Crawler"	Harkin, Ranno, Smith	4:32
8.	"Over and Over"	Smith	3:17
9.	"Pull the Plug"	Harkin, Ranno, Smith	4:43
10.	"Now I Can"	Harkin, Ranno, Smith	4:11

2004 CD edition bonus tracks
No.	Title	Writer(s)	Length
11.	"Sweet Jeremiah" (demo version)	Sweval	3:15
12.	"Fallen Angel" (demo version)		3:25
13.	"Detroit Girls" (demo version)		4:02
14.	"Live Wire" (demo version)		3:57

== Personnel ==
Starz

- Michael Lee Smith – vocals
- Richie Ranno – guitar
- Brendan Harkin – guitar
- Pieter "Pete" Sweval – bass
- Joe X. Dube (aka Jeff Grob) – drums

Additional musicians

- Gary Coleman – additional percussion

Production

- Jack Douglas – producer
- John Jansen, Jay Messina – engineers
- Sam Ginsberg – assistant engineer
