= Coliseum Rock =

- Cover painting by Todd Schorr

Studio album by Starz
- Released: 1978
- Recorded: 1978
- Studio: Soundstage, Toronto, Canada
- Genre: Hard rock
- Length: 39:42
- Label: Capitol
- Producer: Jack Richardson

Starz chronology
Attention Shoppers! (1978)	Coliseum Rock (1978)	Live in Action (1989)

Coliseum Rock is the fourth and final studio album by the American hard rock band Starz. The album was released in 1978. Recorded in Toronto, it was produced by Jack Richardson.

== Critical reception ==
Professional ratings
Review scores
Source	Rating
AllMusic	3/5 stars
Collector's Guide to Heavy Metal	6/10

The Daily Breeze wrote that the album "offers a mixed assortment of hard rock and harsh guitar play," and criticized the band's "lack of imagination." The Spokane Daily Chronicle panned the "power chords, strained vocals and thudding drums."

== Track listing ==
Side one
No.	Title	Writer(s)	Length
1.	"So Young, So Bad"	Michael Lee Smith	3:27
2.	"Take Me"	Richie Ranno, Smith, Bobby Messano	3:58
3.	"No Regrets"	Ranno, Smith, Messano, Orville Davis, Joe X. Dube	4:53
4.	"My Sweet Child"	Smith, Davis	3:58
5.	"Don't Stop Now"	Ranno, Smith, Davis, Messano	3:40

Side two
No.	Title	Writer(s)	Length
6.	"Outfit"	Smith, Ranno, Davis	3:17
7.	"Last Night I Wrote a Letter"	Ranno, Smith	4:59
8.	"Coliseum Rock"	Ranno	3:32
9.	"It's a Riot"	Ranno, Smith	3:33
10.	"Where Will It End"	Ranno, Smith, Dube	4:25

2005 CD edition bonus tracks
No.	Title	Writer(s)	Length
11.	"Vidi O.D."	Ranno, Smith	3:31
12.	"You Called His Name"	Ranno, Smith	4:22

== Personnel ==
Starz

- Michael Lee Smith - vocals
- Richie Ranno - guitar
- Bobby Messano - guitar
- Orville Davis - bass
- Joe X. Dube - drums

Production

- Jack Richardson - producer
- Cub Richardson - engineer, mixing, mastering
- Robert Hrycyna, Mike McCarty - recording technicians
