= Looking Glass (Looking Glass album) =

Studio album by Looking Glass
- Released: June 6, 1972
- Recorded: 1971
- Studios: Regent Sound Studios, New York, New York
- Genres: Pop rock; soft rock; folk rock
- Length: 31:00
- Label: Epic
- Producers: Looking Glass, Bob Liftin

Looking Glass chronology
Looking Glass (1972)	Subway Serenade (1973)

Singles from Looking Glass
- 1. "Don't It Make You Feel Good" / "Catherine Street" Released: January 1972; 2. "Brandy (You're a Fine Girl)" / "One By One" Released: May 1972; 3. "Golden Rainbow" / "Jenny-Lynne" Released: November 1972

Professional ratings
Review scores
Source	Rating
Allmusic	3/5 stars
Christgau's Record Guide	C−

Looking Glass is the self-titled debut album released by the band Looking Glass in 1972.

== Background ==
The group had been playing all up and down the East Coast in clubs, and one night they were spotted by Clive Davis at the Whisky a Go Go. Davis, who at the time was the president of Columbia Records, signed them to the Epic Records label. After trying to record two times (once with Steve Cropper in Memphis), the band began working with Bob Liftin and recorded "Brandy (You're a Fine Girl)". It was not released as the single's A-side, but as the B-side to "Don't It Make You Feel Good" in early 1972. The song went unnoticed by most, but not by Harv Moore, a disc jockey in Washington, D.C. The song would go on to peak 6 months after its release, and the album charted for 16 weeks in the U.S.

== Critical reception ==
In his review of the album, Robert Christgau said simply: "This automatic good time doesn't even have the courage of its own slickness."

== Track listing ==
Original LP order listed. The cassette listing differs in that "From Stanton Station" replaces "Brandy" on the A-Side while "Brandy" opens the B-Side.

Side one
No.	Title	Writer(s)	Lead Vocals	Length
1.	"Jenny-Lynne"	Pieter Sweval	Sweval	3:02
2.	"Brandy (You're a Fine Girl)"	Elliot Lurie	Lurie	3:07
3.	"Catherine Street"	Sweval	Sweval	5:48
4.	"Don't It Make You Feel Good"	Lurie	Lurie	2:51

Side two
No.	Title	Writer(s)	Lead Vocals	Length
5.	"Golden Rainbow"	Lurie	Lurie	3:05
6.	"Dealin' With The Devil"	Sweval	Sweval	3:18
7.	"From Stanton Station"	Lurie	Lurie	3:48
8.	"One By One"	Sweval	Sweval	6:01

== Personnel ==
Looking Glass

- Elliot Lurie – guitars, lead vocals
- Pieter "Piet" Sweval – bass, lead vocals, harp on "Catherine Street" and "From Stanton Station"
- Larry Gonsky – keyboards, background vocals
- Jeff Grob – drums

Additional personnel

- Chuck Connolly – Backup vocals on "Brandy"
- Tasha Thomas, Barbara Massey, Carolyn Davis – Backup vocals on "Don't It Make You Feel Good" (credited as Tasha Thomas and the Feel Good Girls)
- Eddie Hinton – Guitar (with Elliot Lurie) on "Golden Rainbow"
- James Giampa – Congas on "Brandy"
- Larry Fallon – Horns/Strings arrangements
- Tim Geelan, Wayne Tarnowski, Pete Weiss (on "Brandy", uncredited), Billy Radice – Engineer
- Ed Lee – Cover design
- KLN Photos Inc. – Cover photo
- Bob Liftin – Producer/Audio Consultant
- Mike Gershman – Executive producer
- Steve Paley – Special thanks/Back cover photo
- Don Ellis, Steve Baron, Sandy Linzer, Karmic Guardians – Special thanks

All songs published by Evie Music Inc./ Spruce Run Music and Chappell & Co., Inc. (ASCAP)
