= Karen Ann Quinlan =

American woman in right-to-die controversy

- Quinlan in 1972, prior to her brain injury
- Born: March 29, 1954; Scranton, Pennsylvania
- Died: June 11, 1985 (aged 31); Morris Plains, New Jersey

Karen Ann Quinlan (March 29, 1954 – June 11, 1985) was an American woman who became an important figure in the history of the right to die controversy in the United States.

When she was 21, Quinlan became unconscious after she consumed Valium along with alcohol while on a crash diet and lapsed into a coma, followed by a persistent vegetative state. After doctors refused the request of her parents (Joseph and Julia Quinlan) to disconnect Quinlan's ventilator, her parents filed suit to get her disconnected. The parents believed that continuing to keep her on the ventilator constituted extraordinary means of prolonging her life.

Eventually a court ruled that the ventilator could be withdrawn. However, Quinlan continued to breathe on her own. She survived over a decade in a persistent vegetative state.

Quinlan's case continues to raise important questions in moral theology, bioethics, euthanasia, legal guardianship and civil rights. Her case has affected the practice of medicine and law around the world. A significant outcome of her case was the development of formal ethics committees in hospitals, nursing homes, and hospices.

== Early life, collapse, and coma ==
Quinlan was born on March 29, 1954, in Scranton, Pennsylvania, to a young woman of Irish American ancestry. A few weeks later, she was adopted by Joseph and Julia Quinlan, devout Roman Catholics who lived in the Landing section of Roxbury Township, New Jersey. Julia and Joseph also had daughter Mary Ellen in 1956 and son John in 1957. Quinlan attended Morris Catholic High School in Denville, New Jersey. After graduation, she worked at the Mykroy Ceramics Corporation in Ledgewood, New Jersey, from 1972 to 1974, and held several other jobs over the next year. Quinlan was a singer, and her parents characterized her as a tomboy. In April 1975, shortly after she turned 21, Quinlan left her parents' home and moved with two roommates into a house a few miles away in Byram Township, New Jersey. Around the same time, she went on a radical diet, reportedly to fit into a dress that she had bought.

On April 15, 1975, a few days after moving into her new house, Quinlan attended a friend's birthday party at a local bar (then known as Falconer's Lackawanna Inn) on Lake Lackawanna in Byram. She had eaten almost nothing for two days. At the party, she reportedly drank several gin and tonics and took Valium. Shortly afterwards, she felt faint and was quickly taken home and put to bed. When friends checked on her about 15 minutes later, they found that she was not breathing. An ambulance was called and mouth-to-mouth resuscitation was attempted. Eventually some color returned to her pallid skin, but she did not regain consciousness. Quinlan was admitted in a coma to Newton Memorial Hospital in Newton, New Jersey. She remained there for nine days in an unresponsive condition before being transferred to Saint Clare's Hospital, a larger facility in Denville. Quinlan weighed 115 pounds (52 kg) when admitted to the hospital.

Quinlan had suffered irreversible brain damage after experiencing respiratory failure. Her brain was damaged to the extent that she entered a persistent vegetative state. Her eyes were "disconjugate" (i.e., they no longer moved in the same direction together). Her EEG showed only abnormal slow-wave activity. Over the next few months, she remained in the hospital as her condition gradually deteriorated. She lost weight, eventually weighing less than 80 pounds (36 kg). She was prone to unpredictable, violent thrashing of her limbs. She was given nasogastric feeding and a ventilator to help her breathe.

== Legal battle ==
Quinlan's parents requested that she be disconnected from her ventilator, which they believed constituted extraordinary means of prolonging her life because it caused her pain. However, the Morris County prosecutor threatened to press homicide charges against the hospital if it complied with the parents' request. Hospital officials joined with the Quinlan family in seeking an appropriate protective order from the courts before the hospital would allow the ventilator to be removed.

=== Suit and appeal ===
The Quinlan family filed a suit on September 12, 1975, to request that the extraordinary means prolonging Quinlan's life be terminated. The Quinlans' lawyers argued that the parents’ right to make a private decision about their daughter's fate superseded the state's right to keep her alive, while Karen's court-appointed guardian argued that disconnecting her ventilator would constitute homicide. The parents' request was denied by New Jersey Superior Court Judge Robert Muir Jr. in November 1975. He cited Quinlan's doctors as not supporting removing her from the ventilator, and he stated that whether or not to do so was a medical rather than a judicial decision. Muir also maintained that removing the ventilator would violate New Jersey homicide statutes.

The Quinlans' attorneys, Paul W. Armstrong and James M. Crowley, appealed the decision to the New Jersey Supreme Court. On March 31, 1976, the court granted their request, holding that the right to privacy was broad enough to encompass the Quinlans' request on their daughter's behalf.

When Quinlan was removed from her ventilator in May 1976, she surprised many by continuing to breathe unaided. Her parents never sought to have her feeding tube removed. "We never asked to have her die. We just asked to have her put back in a natural state so she could die in God's time," Julia Quinlan said. Quinlan was moved to a nursing home, where she was fed by artificial nutrition for nine more years. She died from respiratory failure on June 11, 1985.

=== Extraordinary means ===
Catholic moral theology does not require that "extraordinary means" be employed to preserve a patient's life. Such means are any procedure that might place an undue burden on the patient, family, or others and that would not result in reasonable hope of benefiting the patient. It is considered ethical for a person (or a person's representative in cases where the individual is not able to decide for themselves) to refuse extraordinary means of treatment even if doing so will hasten natural death. It is to this Catholic principle that Quinlan's parents appealed when they requested that the extraordinary means of a ventilator be removed, citing a declaration by Pope Pius XII from 1957.

== Life after the court decision, death, and legacy ==
In May 1976, following the successful appeal, Quinlan was disconnected from the ventilator. Quinlan's parents continued to allow her to be fed with a feeding tube. Since the feeding tube did not cause her pain, her parents did not consider it extraordinary means. Quinlan continued in a persistent vegetative state for slightly more than nine years, until her death from respiratory failure as a result of complications from pneumonia on June 11, 1985, in Morris Plains, New Jersey. Upon learning that Quinlan was expected to die, her parents requested that no extraordinary means be used to revive her. Quinlan weighed 65 lb (29 kg) at the time of her death. Quinlan was buried at the Gate of Heaven Cemetery in East Hanover, New Jersey.

=== Hospice ===
Joseph and Julia Quinlan opened a hospice and memorial foundation in 1980 to honor their daughter's memory. Her court case is linked to legal changes and hospital practices involving the right to refuse extraordinary means of treatment, even in cases where cessation of treatment could end a life.

=== Autopsy findings ===
When Quinlan was alive, the extent of damage to her brain stem could not be precisely determined. After she died, her entire brain and spinal cord were studied carefully. While her cerebral cortex had moderate scarring, her thalamus had sustained extensive damage bilaterally. Her brain stem, which controls breathing and cardiac functions, was undamaged. These findings suggest that the thalamus plays a particularly important role in consciousness.

== In popular culture ==
The Quinlans published two books about the case: Karen Ann: The Quinlans Tell Their Story (1977) and My Joy, My Sorrow: Karen Ann's Mother Remembers (2005).

In 1976, the band Starz included on their eponymous debut album a song called "Pull the Plug" that paralleled Quinlan's story.

The 1977 TV movie In the Matter of Karen Ann Quinlan was made about the Quinlan case, with Piper Laurie and Brian Keith playing Quinlan's parents.

The title character of Douglas Coupland's novel Girlfriend in a Coma is Karen Ann McNeil. She collapses after a party where she has taken Valium as well as some alcohol. Like Quinlan, she has deliberately stopped eating in order to fit into an outfit (in this case, a bikini). For these reasons (and the frequent nostalgic references to events from the 1970s in Coupland's works), the character is thought to be based on Quinlan, though the title is in reference to the unrelated 1987 song by the Smiths.

Donna Levin’s novel Extraordinary Means is a literary fantasy in which a young woman, although diagnosed as being in an irreversible coma (also brought on by an accidental combination of drugs and alcohol), is able to observe her family members debate over whether or not to withdraw her life support.

== See also ==
- Right to die
- Coma
- Brain death
- Jahi McMath case
- Nancy Cruzan
- Terri Schiavo
