= Live in Action =

Live album by Starz
- Released: 1989
- Recorded: Louisville, Kentucky, 1978 and Cleveland, Ohio, 1977
- Genre: Hard rock, heavy metal, power pop
- Length: 66:00
- Label: Metal Blade
- Producer: Starz, Brian Slagel

Starz chronology
| Coliseum Rock (1978) | Live in Action (1989) | Greatest Hits Live (2004) |

Professional ratings
Review scores
| Source | Rating |
|---|---|
| Collector's Guide to Heavy Metal | 7/10 |

Live in Action is the fifth album and first live album by the American hard rock band Starz. The album contains live recordings from 1977 and 1978 and was released by Metal Blade Records in 1989.

== Track listing ==
| No. | Title | Length |
|---|---|---|
| 1. | "(She's Just a) Fallen Angel" | 3:38 |
| 2. | "Tear it Down" | 3:10 |
| 3. | "Live Wire" | 4:12 |
| 4. | "Monkey Business" | 2:48 |
| 5. | "Detroit Girls" | 5:07 |
| 6. | "She" | 3:35 |
| 7. | "Rock Six Times" | 3:44 |
| 8. | "Subway Terror" | 4:16 |
| 9. | "Cool One" | 3:15 |
| 10. | "X-Ray Specs" | 3:00 |
| 11. | "Cherry Baby" | 4:05 |
| 12. | "Medley: Waiting on You / Greatest Riffs of All Time / Coliseum Rock" | 9:15 |
| 13. | "Pull the Plug" | 9:13 |
| 14. | "Boys in Action" | 6:42 |

Double vinyl edition bonus track
| No. | Title | Length |
|---|---|---|
| 1. | "Johnny All Alone" | 7:16 |

== Personnel ==
Starz

- Michael Lee Smith - vocals
- Richie Ranno - guitar
- Brendan Harkin - guitar
- Pieter "Pete" Sweval - bass
- Joe X. Dube - drums
