= Gene Simmons (disambiguation) =

Gene Simmons (born 1949) is an Israeli-American musician, singer, and songwriter.

- Gene Simmons (album), his 1978 debut studio album

Gene Simmons may also refer to:

- Jumpin' Gene Simmons (1937–2006), American rockabilly singer and songwriter
- Ronald Gene Simmons (1940–1990), American spree killer

== See also ==
- Jean Simmons (1929–2010), British actress and singer
