= Violation (album) =

Studio album by Starz
- Released: 1977
- Recorded: 1977
- Studios: Record Plant and A&R, New York City
- Genre: Heavy metal
- Length: 36:00
- Label: Capitol
- Producer: Jack Douglas

Starz chronology
Starz (1976)	Violation (1977)	Attention Shoppers! (1978)

Violation is the second studio album by the American band Starz, released in 1977. The single "Cherry Baby" peaked at number 33 on the Billboard Hot 100 in May 1977. It was the band's highest-charting single.

== Critical reception ==
Professional ratings
Review scores
Source	Rating
AllMusic	3/5 stars
Collector's Guide to Heavy Metal	8/10
Record Mirror	3/5 stars
The New Rolling Stone Album Guide	0/5 stars

The New Rolling Stone Album Guide gave the album zero stars. Martin Popoff, in The Big Book of Hair Metal: The Illustrated Oral History of Heavy Metal's Debauched Decade, called Violation a "proto-hair metal semi-classic".

== Track listing ==
All tracks are written by Starz, except as noted.

Side one
No.	Title	Writer(s)	Length
1.	"Cherry Baby"		3:47
2.	"Rock Six Times"		3:15
3.	"Sing It, Shout It"	Jon Parrot, Sean Delaney	5:10
4.	"Violation"		4:26

Side two
No.	Title	Length
1.	"Subway Terror"	3:45
2.	"All Night Long"	3:26
3.	"Cool One"	3:40
4.	"S. T. E. A. D. Y."	5:25
5.	"Is That a Street Light or the Moon?"	3:06

2005 CD edition bonus tracks
No.	Title	Length
10.	"Do It with the Lights On" (demo version)	3:34
11.	"Cool One" (demo version)	3:22
12.	"Rock This Town" (demo version)	2:47

== Personnel ==
Starz

- Michael Lee Smith – vocals
- Richie Ranno – guitar
- Brendan Harkin – guitar
- Pieter "Pete" Sweval – bass
- Joe X. Dube – drums

Production

- Jack Douglas – producer
- Jay Messina – engineer
- Sam Ginsberg, Dave Martone – assistant engineers
