= Radioactive (Gene Simmons song) =

Single by Gene Simmons

from the album Gene Simmons
- Released: September 18, 1978
- Recorded: April–July 1978
- Genre: Rock; hard rock
- Length: 2:54
- Label: Casablanca
- Songwriter: Gene Simmons
- Producers: Gene Simmons and Sean Delaney

Audio
- "Radioactive" on YouTube

"Radioactive" is a song by American musician and Kiss member Gene Simmons, released on September 18, 1978, by Casablanca Records. It was released as the lead single from his studio album Gene Simmons, which was also released on that same day. The song was written by Simmons and Ron Frangipane and produced by Simmons and Sean Delaney. It peaked at #47 on the US Billboard charts during an eight-week run between April and May 1979. When the single was released, a limited-edition red vinyl 45 rpm album was made available.

"Radioactive" features Bob Seger and Aerosmith guitarist Joe Perry. Approximately one minute of the song was edited from the album version for the single, subsequently removing the Prelude, which features musician Janis Ian on vocals.

Cash Box said that it has "heavy rhythm guitar work, stiff beat, good singing and good hook."

== Personnel ==
- Gene Simmons – lead vocals
- Steve Lacey – guitar
- Joe Perry – guitar
- John Shane Howell – classical guitar
- Neil Jason – bass
- Eric Troyer – piano
- Allan Schwartzberg – drums
- Bob Seger – backing vocals
- Janis Ian – backing vocals on Prelude (not released on single)
- Ron Frangipane – arranger of Prelude (not released on single)

== Charts ==
Chart (1978–1979)	Peak position
Canada Top Singles (RPM)	66
UK Singles (Official Charts)	41
US Billboard Hot 100	47
