= Attention Shoppers! =

Studio album by Starz
- Released: 1978
- Recorded: 1977
- Studio: Secret Sound, New York City
- Genre: Pop, pop metal
- Length: 37:34
- Label: Capitol
- Producer: Starz

Starz chronology
Violation (1977)	Attention Shoppers! (1978)	Coliseum Rock (1978)

Attention Shoppers! is the third studio album by the American hard rock band Starz, released in 1978.

The album peaked at No. 105 on the Billboard 200.

== Production ==
The album was recorded at Secret Sound and was produced by the band.

== Critical reception ==
Professional ratings
Review scores
Source	Rating
AllMusic	3/5 stars
The Collector's Guide to Heavy Metal	4/10
The Encyclopedia of Popular Music	2/5 stars
The New Rolling Stone Record Guide	0/5 stars

In 2005, The Village Voice noted that "blue-movie power rock is forsaken for sap pop."

== Track listing ==
All tracks are written by Starz.

Side one
No.	Title	Length
1.	"Hold On to the Night"	3:19
2.	"She"	3:22
3.	"Third Time's the Charm"	4:36
4.	"(Any Way That You Want It) I'll Be There"	3:24
5.	"Waitin' on You"	3:24

Side two
No.	Title	Length
1.	"X-Ray Spex"	3:29
2.	"Good Ale We Seek"	4:43
3.	"Don't Think"	3:46
4.	"Johnny All Alone"	7:31

2005 CD edition bonus tracks
No.	Title	Writer(s)	Length
10.	"Texas"	Richie Ranno, Michael Lee Smith	3:58
11.	"Wind"		4:17

== Personnel ==
Starz

- Michael Lee Smith - lead vocals, percussion, guitar
- Richie Ranno - guitar, backing vocals
- Brendan Harkin - guitar, backing vocals, percussion
- Pieter "Pete" Sweval - bass, vocals
- Joe X. Dubé - drums, percussion, synthesizer

Production

- Jack Malken, Michael Barry - engineers
- Bob Ludwig - mastering at Masterdisk, New York City
