= Asshole (album) =

Studio album by Gene Simmons
- Released: June 8, 2004
- Genre: Hard rock, heavy metal
- Length: 44:38
- Label: Sanctuary
- Producer: Gene Simmons

Gene Simmons chronology
Gene Simmons (1978)	Asshole (2004)

Asshole is the second solo studio album by Kiss's Gene Simmons and it was released in 2004 on Sanctuary Records. Its controversial title does not appear on the front cover. On the side of the CD case the title reads "***hole". "It's just another way of me saying, 'I don't care what anyone says about me," Simmons declared. "I'm preempting what people say and therefore diffusing the power of my detractors."

Professional ratings
Review scores
Source	Rating
AllMusic	2/5 stars
Blender	2/5 stars

== Background ==
"Waiting for the Morning Light" co-written by Bob Dylan.

"Black Tongue" was based on an unfinished song of the same name composed by Frank Zappa. Simmons licensed a recording of Zappa playing the initial riff and built a new composition around it, with playing by Dweezil Zappa and backup vocals by Dweezil, Ahmet Zappa, Moon Zappa and Frank Zappa's widow, Gail.

Dave Navarro plays guitar on the Prodigy cover "Firestarter".

== Track listing ==
No.	Title	Writer(s)	Length
1.	"Sweet & Dirty Love"	Gene Simmons	3:03
2.	"Firestarter" (The Prodigy cover, featuring Dave Navarro)	Liam Howlett, Keith Flint, Trevor Horn, J. J. Jeczalik, Anne Dudley, Kim Deal, Gary Langan, Paul Morley	3:20
3.	"Weapons of Mass Destruction"	Gene Simmons	3:44
4.	"Waiting for the Morning Light"	Gene Simmons, Bob Dylan	3:22
5.	"Beautiful"	Mark Addison, Nina Singh	4:04
6.	"Asshole"	Frank Albin Tostrup	3:19
7.	"Now That You're Gone"	Gene Simmons, Bob Kulick	3:20
8.	"Whatever Turns You On"	Gene Simmons, Dave Williams	3:14
9.	"Dog"	Gene Simmons, Bag	3:07
10.	"Black Tongue"	Gene Simmons, Frank Zappa	4:28
11.	"Carnival of Souls"	Gene Simmons, Scott Van Zen	3:26
12.	"If I Had a Gun"	Gene Simmons, Bag	2:59
13.	"1,000 Dreams"	Gene Simmons	3:19
Total length:			44:38

- The Japanese edition featured two bonus tracks: Everybody Knows and You're My Reason For Living.

== Personnel ==
- Gene Simmons – vocals, rhythm guitars on track 3, bass on tracks 1, 3, 7, 10, 11
- Eric Singer – drums on tracks 1 & 3
- Bruce Kulick – guitars on tracks 1 & 3
- Richie Kotzen – guitars on tracks 10, 11
- Dave Navarro – guitar on track 2
- Thomas Ruud – lead guitar, rhythm guitar on track 6
- Holland McRae – lead guitar on track 8
- Mark Addison – drums, bass, keyboards, guitar, background vocals on track 5
- Nina Singh – drums, guitar, percussion, background vocals on track 5
- Frank Albin Tostrup – drums, bass, rhythm guitars, percussion on track 6
- Dan Cuprier – drums on track 8
- Jeff Diehl – keyboards on track 7
- Brian LeBarton – piano on track 8
- Kylie O'Brien – background vocals on track 7
- Zachary Grant – background vocals on track 7
- Michelle Casio – background vocals on track 8
- Nira Weiss – background vocals on track 8
- Dave Williams – background vocals on track 8
- Chris Parrish – background vocals on track 11
- Steve Parrish – background vocals on track 11
- Sophie Tweed Simmons – background vocals on track 7
- Louise Tweed – background vocals on track 8
- Shannon Tweed – background noise on track 8
- Nick Tweed Simmons – background vocals on track 11
- Ahmet Zappa – background vocals on track 10
- Dweezil Zappa – guitar solo, background vocals on track 10
- Frank Zappa – guitars, voice on track 10
- Moon Zappa – background vocals on track 10
- Gail Zappa – background vocals on track 10

== Charts ==
Chart performance for Asshole
Chart (2004)	Peak position
Australian Albums (ARIA)	57
Norwegian Albums (VG-lista)	23
Swedish Albums (Sverigetopplistan)	25
US Billboard 200	86
