= Jimmy Loves Mary-Anne =

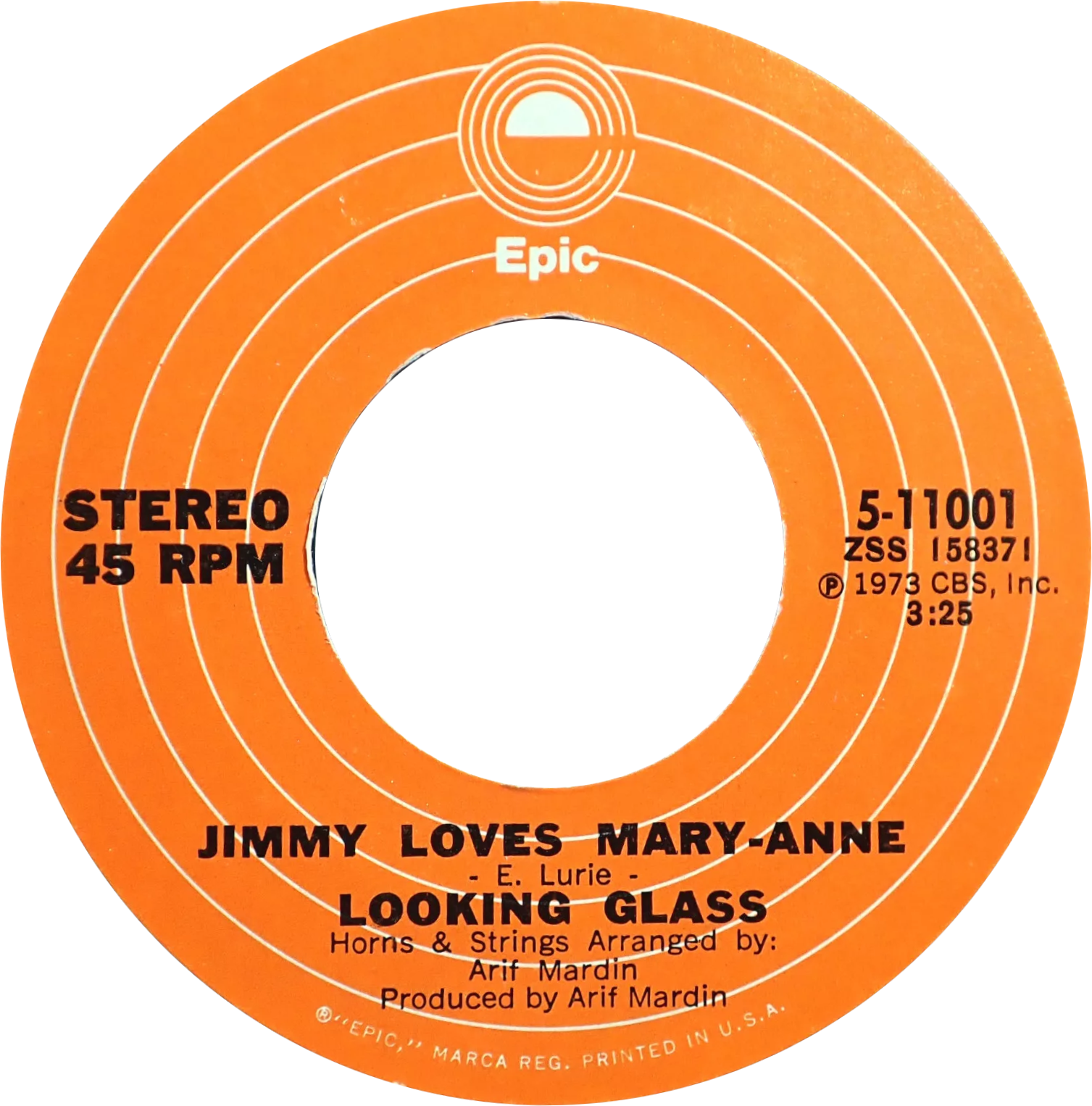
- One of side-A labels of the US single

Single by Looking Glass

from the album Subway Serenade
- B-side: "Wooly Eyes"
- Released: July 1973
- Recorded: 1972
- Length: 3:25 (Single remix/edit); 3:37 (Album mix version)
- Label: Epic Records
- Songwriter(s): Elliot Lurie
- Producer(s): Arif Mardin

Looking Glass singles chronology
"Brandy (You're a Fine Girl)" (1972)	"Jimmy Loves Mary-Anne" (1973)

Music video
- Listen to "Jimmy Loves Mary-Anne" on YouTube

"Jimmy Loves Mary-Anne" is a 1973 song written and composed by Elliot Lurie and recorded by Lurie's band, Looking Glass. It was the first track on their second and final album, Subway Serenade. The title has also been spelled "Jimmy Loves Mary-Ann".

== Background ==
The lyrics speak of hard-knock life in the inner city. Jimmy and Mary-Anne fall in love and, although they are street wise, dream of running away together and escaping their dead-end life.

== Chart performance ==
The single spent a total of 15 weeks on the Billboard Hot 100, just one week less than their number 1 hit, "Brandy". It debuted at number 93 on that chart the week of July 21, 1973 and peaked at number 33 the weeks of September 29 and October 6, 1973. On the U.S. Cash Box Top 100, it peaked at number 31. It was a bigger hit in Canada, reaching number 21.

=== Weekly charts ===
Chart (1973)	Peak position
Canadian RPM 100	21
U.S. Billboard Hot 100	33
U.S. Cash Box Top 100	31
U.S. Billboard Adult Contemporary	16
U.S. Record World	22

=== Year-end charts ===
Chart (1973)	Rank
Canada	156
U.S. Billboard Hot 100	204

Chicago radio superstation WLS, which gave "Jimmy Loves Mary-Anne" much airplay, ranked the song as the 72nd biggest hit of 1973. It peaked at number 2 on their survey of October 13, 1973.

== Cover versions ==
- Mark Williams covered the song, retitled as "Jimmy Loves Marianne" in 1975. It was used as the B-side to his song, "Yesterday Was Just the Beginning of My Life", a number 1 hit single in New Zealand.
- Josie Cotton released "Jimmy Loves Maryann" in 1984, again with a variant spelling. It was her second chart single in the U.S.; it reached number 82 on the Billboard Hot 100.
