= Gene Simmons (album) =

- Cover by Eraldo Carugati

Studio album by Gene Simmons
- Released: September 18, 1978
- Recorded: April–July 1978
- Studios: The Manor, Oxfordshire; Cherokee, Hollywood; Blue Rock, New York City
- Genres: Hard rock; pop rock; rock and roll
- Length: 38:58
- Label: Casablanca
- Producers: Gene Simmons; Sean Delaney

Gene Simmons chronology
Gene Simmons (1978)	Asshole (2004)

Singles from Gene Simmons
- 1. "Radioactive" Released: 1978

Gene Simmons is the first solo album by Gene Simmons, the bassist and co-lead vocalist of the hard rock band Kiss. It is one of four solo albums released by each member of Kiss, but yet still under the Kiss label, coming out alongside Peter Criss, Ace Frehley, and Paul Stanley. It was released on September 18, 1978. Reaching number 22 on the US Billboard 200 albums chart, it was the highest-placing of all the four Kiss solo albums. Mainly a hard rock style album, it also features choirs and string arrangements on some songs, as well as incorporating various musical genres including Beatles-inspired pop, 1970s funk, and rock and roll.

== Album information ==
Although he is the bass player in Kiss, Simmons played mainly electric and acoustic guitars on the album, leaving the bass duties to Neil Jason. The album features guest appearances from well-known musicians, including Aerosmith's Joe Perry, Bob Seger, Cheap Trick's Rick Nielsen, Donna Summer, Helen Reddy and Cher. Though an unknown at the time, backing vocalist Katey Sagal would go on to a successful television career.

Simmons re-recorded "See You in Your Dreams" because he reportedly was not happy with the way it was recorded on Rock and Roll Over. Simmons said that he covered "When You Wish Upon a Star" because he related to the song and was a fan of Disney movies. "When I first heard that song I could barely speak English but I knew the words were true. Anybody can have what they want, the world and life can give its rewards to anyone".

The songs "Burning Up with Fever", "Man of 1000 Faces" and "True Confessions" were demoed in August 1975 for the Destroyer album, but rejected by producer Bob Ezrin. They were finally released in 2021 on the bonus disc in the 2CD and Superdeluxe box set versions of Destroyer. "See You Tonite", based on an acoustic Wicked Lester demo from August 1971, was also demoed in 1975, and the demo versions of all four songs are on the Gene Simmons Vault box set, along with a 1976 demo of "Mr. Make Believe"

On the original CD release in 1988 the first two songs are split incorrectly. The introduction that leads into "Radioactive" is split at the 51-second mark while the rest of "Radioactive" and all of "Burning Up with Fever" are played in the second track. However, the track listing of the cover lists the two songs as two separate tracks. The rest of the CD is split correctly. The 1997 remastered edition fixes this mistake with "Radioactive" and "Burning Up with Fever" being split as two separate tracks. The introduction played before "Radioactive" is left in as part of the song.

== Reception ==
Professional ratings
Review scores
Source	Rating
AllMusic	3/5 stars
Collector's Guide to Heavy Metal	3/10
Pitchfork	5.0/10
The Rolling Stone Album Guide	2.5/5 stars
Spin Alternative Record Guide	3/10
Uncut	2/5 stars

The album reached number 22 on the US Billboard 200 albums chart, making it the highest-placing of all the four Kiss solo albums of 1978. It was certified platinum on October 2, 1978, having shipped 1,000,000 copies.

AllMusic gave the album 3 stars out of 5 and called it an "unpredictable yet ultimately enjoyable release."

== Track listing ==
All credits adapted from the original release.

All tracks are written by Gene Simmons, except where noted.

Side one
No.	Title	Length
1.	"Radioactive"	3:50 (Note: Only says 46 seconds on some CDs when playing them in CD players.)
2.	"Burning Up with Fever"	4:19 (Note: Says 7:23 in length on some CDs when playing them on CD players.)
3.	"See You Tonite"	2:30
4.	"Tunnel of Love"	3:49
5.	"True Confessions"	3:30

Side two
No.	Title	Writer(s)	Length
6.	"Living in Sin"	Simmons, Sean Delaney, Howard Marks	3:50
7.	"Always Near You / Nowhere to Hide"		4:12
8.	"Man of 1000 Faces"		3:16
9.	"Mr. Make Believe"		4:00
10.	"See You in Your Dreams"		2:48
11.	"When You Wish Upon a Star"	Ned Washington, Leigh Harline	2:44
Total length:			38:58

== Personnel ==
- Gene Simmons – vocals, guitar, bass

=== Additional personnel ===
- Neil Jason – bass
- Elliot Randall – guitars
- Allan Schwartzberg – drums
- Sean Delaney – percussion, backing vocals
- Ron Frangipane – symphonic arrangements and conductor of Members of the New York and Los Angeles Philharmonic Orchestras
- Gordon Grody, Diva Gray, Kate Sagal, Franny Eisenberg, Carolyn Ray – backing vocals
- Eric Troyer – piano and vocals on "Radioactive" & "Living in Sin"
- Steve Lacey – guitars on "Radioactive"
- John Shane Howell – classical guitar, segue between "Radioactive" & "Burning Up with Fever"
- Richard Gerstein – piano on "True Confessions" & "Always Near You / Nowhere to Hide"
- Joe Perry – guitars on "Radioactive" & "Tunnel of Love"
- Bob Seger – backing vocals on "Radioactive" & "Living in Sin"
- Rick Nielsen – guitars on "See You in Your Dreams"
- Helen Reddy – background vocals on "True Confessions"
- Jeff "Skunk" Baxter – guitars on "Burning Up with Fever", "See You Tonite", "Tunnel of Love" & "Mr. Make Believe"
- Donna Summer – background vocals on "Burning Up with Fever," & "Tunnel of Love"
- Janis Ian – backing vocals on the "Prelude to Radioactive"
- Cher – spoken word phone call on "Living in Sin"
- Mitch Weissman & Joe Pecorino (Beatlemania) – backing vocals on "Mr. Make Believe", "See You Tonite" & "Always Near You / Nowhere to Hide"
- Michael Des Barres – background vocals on "See You in Your Dreams"
- Richie Ranno – guitars on "Tunnel of Love"
- The Citrus College Singers – chorus on "True Confessions" & "Always Near You / Nowhere to Hide"

=== Production ===
- Gene Simmons – co–producer
- Sean Delaney – co–producer
- George Marino – mastering
- Eraldo Carugati – album cover

== Charts ==
Chart (1978–1979)	Peak position
Australian Albums (Kent Music Report)	32
Canada Top Albums/CDs (RPM)	21
Japanese Albums (Oricon)	24
US Billboard 200	22

== Certifications ==
Region	Certification	Certified units/sales
Canada (Music Canada)	Gold	50,000^{^}
United States (RIAA)	Platinum	1,000,000^{^}
^{^} Shipments figures based on certification alone.
