= Highway (Sean Delaney album) =

Studio album by Sean Delaney
- Released: January 9, 1979
- Recorded: Electric Lady Studios, New York City, and A&R Studio, New York City; 1978
- Genre: Hard rock
- Length: 40:23
- Label: Casablanca
- Producer: Sean Delaney & Mike Stone

Highway is a solo album by Sean Delaney. Delaney's recording of this album was related to his work on Gene Simmons' and Peter Criss' solo albums. Delaney used his studio musicians to record some demo material for Peter Criss that was simply released on Criss's solo album.

The song "Dreams" became the title track for Grace Slick's 1980 solo album.

== Release details ==
Label: Casablanca Records & Filmworks
Matrix: NBLP/NBL5-7130

== Track listing ==
All tracks composed by Sean Delaney; except where indicated

1. "Welcome to the Circus" – 4:00
2. "High On The Liquor of Love" – 3:07
3. "Somebody Love Me" – 4:10
4. "Baton Rouge" – 3:47
5. "Old Man" – 4:08
6. "You Beat Me to the Punch" (Ronald White, Smokey Robinson) – 3:18
7. "Spotlights" – 3:50
8. "It's Over" – 3:20
9. "Walk on the Water" (Delaney, Sweval) – 5:36
10. "Dreams" – 5:17

== Personnel ==
- Sean Delaney - Lead Vocals, Keyboards
- Neil Jason - Bass Guitar
- Elliott Randall - Electric and Acoustic Guitars
- Jeff "Skunk" Baxter - Electric Guitar and Pedal Steel
- Paul Shaffer - Keyboards
- Paul Fleischer - Saxophone
- Allan Schwartzberg - Drums
- Richard T. Bear - Piano on "Spotlights"
- George Butcher - Piano
- Julian Colbech - Organ
- Lani Groves, Diva Gray, Gordon Grody, Luther Vandross, Peter Sweval, Sean Delaney, Sheenah Du Lange - Backing Vocals
- Ron Frangipane - Symphonic arrangements for "Old Man" and "Dreams"
- Adrienne Albert - Conductor of Gospel choir for "Walk On The Water"

== Recording details ==
- Produced by Sean Delaney and Mike Stone
- Executive Producer: Mike Stone
- Assistant Engineers: John Brand (Trident), Mike Frondelli (Electric Lady), Ollie Cotton (A&R)
- Tape Operator: "Young" Adam Moseley (Trident)
- Recorded at: Electric Lady Studio, NY, NY & A&R Studio, NY, NY
- Mixed at Trident Studios, London, England
- Mastered at: Sterling Sound, "At Night" with George Marino, NY, NY
- Cover painting: George Derpapas
- Dedicated to: GUI, GENE, PAUL, ACE, & PETER
