= Looking Glass (band) =

American pop rock band

- Origin: New Brunswick, New Jersey, United States
- Genres: Pop rock, soft rock, country rock, Jersey Shore sound
- Years active: 1969–1975, 2003–present
- Members: Elliot Lurie; Jeff Lehman; Craig Williams; Eric Mackey; Colton Truman
- Past members: Lawrence Gonsky; Pieter Sweval (deceased); Jeff Grob; Brendan Harkin; Michael Lee Smith; Chuck Connolly; Richie Ranno

Looking Glass is an American pop rock band formed in New Jersey that were active during the early 1970s. They are known for their chart-topping 1972 hit song "Brandy (You're a Fine Girl)", which reached No. 1 on both the U.S. Billboard Hot 100 and Cash Box Top 100 charts, remaining in the top position for one week. They were part of the Jersey Shore sound.

== History ==
The group was formed in 1969, at Rutgers University in New Brunswick, New Jersey. The original version of the band broke up after college, with original members Elliot Lurie (born August 19, 1948) and Larry Gonsky (born October 20, 1949, Paterson, New Jersey) recruiting two new members to form the classic Looking Glass lineup, Jeff Grob (born December 6, 1950) and Pieter Sweval (born April 13, 1948 — died January 23, 1990), on drums and bass.

The group had the #1 hit single for the week of August 26, 1972, with "Brandy (You're a Fine Girl)", written by Lurie; and also a Top 40 hit "Jimmy Loves Mary-Anne" (1973), subsequently recorded by Josie Cotton. "Brandy (You're a Fine Girl)" was released in the US in June 1972. It topped the Billboard Hot 100 for one week and remained on the chart for 16 weeks. This disc, their only million seller, was certified gold by the RIAA on August 9, 1972.

Guitarist Brendan Harkin joined Looking Glass in early 1974, and Lurie left soon afterward to pursue a solo career, replaced by Michael Lee Smith, a singer from Georgia. Later that same year, the group changed its name to Fallen Angels. After Richie Ranno joined as second guitarist in September 1975, keyboardist Gonsky departed, and by late 1975, Fallen Angels's name had changed once again to Starz.

In 2003, Lurie reconstituted the group with new musicians.

== Later history ==
Lurie appeared as a solo artist with "Your Love Song," an entry on Billboard's "Easy Listening" chart in 1974.

Grob left music in 1979 and became a landscape architect. In 2003, he reformed Starz and still tours today.

Gonsky became a music teacher in Morris Township in 1994 and still teaches as of 2017.

Sweval left Starz in 1978 and co-founded the Skatt Brothers the following year. He died on January 23, 1990, having succumbed to AIDS.

== Members ==
- Elliot Lurie — lead vocals, guitar (1969—1974, 2003—present)
- Larry Gonsky — keyboards (1969—1975)
- Pieter Sweval — bass guitar (1969—1975; died 1990)
- Jeff Grob — drums (1969—1975)
- Brendan Harkin — guitar (1973—1975)
- Michael Lee Smith — lead vocals, guitar (1974—1975)
- Chuck Connolly - Drums, Vocals (1972-1973)
- Richie Ranno — guitar (1975)

== Discography ==
=== Albums ===
Year	Album	Peak chart positions	
Year	Album	US	AUS
1972	Looking Glass	113	56
1973	Subway Serenade	—	—

=== Singles ===
Year	Song	Peak chart positions						Certifications
Year	Song	US	US Cash Box	US Adult	AUS	CAN	UK	Certifications
1972	"Brandy (You're a Fine Girl)"	1	1	7	10	1	55 (Note: Chart position is from the official UK "Breakers List".)	BPI: Gold
1972	"Golden Rainbow"	—	75	37	—	—	—	
1973	"Rainbow Man"	104	94	—	—	—	—	
1973	"Jimmy Loves Mary-Anne"	33	31	16	75	21	—	
1974	"Sweet Somethin'"	—	—	—	—	—	—	
"—" denotes releases that did not chart or were not released in that territory.
