= Gene Simmons Vault =

Box set by Gene Simmons
- Released: November 2017
- Recorded: 1966–2016
- Genres: Heavy metal; glam metal; hard rock
- Length: 10 (+1) discs / 151 (+15) songs
- Label: Rhino
- Producer: Gene Simmons

Gene Simmons Vault is a box set of 10 CDs, 151 songs selected from demos made by Kiss vocalist and bass player Gene Simmons, during his career at that point (1966–2016).

It is packaged in a specially designed road case and includes in addition to the discs also bonus material - a Gene Simmons action figure, a book and a medallion. The initial run was a limited edition personally delivered by Simmons to the purchaser, and the meeting could be arranged in three different formats:

- The standard Vault experience, a meeting in a specified location with a group of fans who have purchased the box set and booked this event - offered at $2,000.
- The "Producer Experience," in which purchasing fans are given exclusive studio time with Simmons in addition to access to more unreleased recordings. Your name also appears as "executive producer" on The Vault and you are guaranteed low-numbered edition (1-500). - offered at $25,000
- "the Gene Simmons Vault Home Experience." – Simmons will personally make the delivery to your home - offered at $50,000

The three unreleased demos Gene Simmons made with Van Halen' Alex and Eddie Van Halen in the 1970s appear on disc three of this box set. They are "Christine Sixteen", "Got Love for Sale" (both rerecorded by Kiss for Love Gun) and "Tunnel Of Love" (which appears on Gene Simmons' 1978 solo album with guitar work by Aerosmith' Joe Perry).

== Track listing ==
Disc one	Track length and songwriters
1. Are You Ready [2011]	(3:13) Simmons
2. I Turn to Stone	(3:58) Simmons
3. Juliet	(2:52) Simmons / Tamplin
4. Hey You	(3:44) Simmons / Tamplin
5. I Confess	(3:40) Simmons / Tamplin
6. Legends Never Die [1982]	(4:24) Simmons / Mitchell / Free
7. Something Wicked This Way Comes [1988]	(3:44) Simmons
8. Hand of Fate	(3:15) Simmons
9. Hunger	(4:14) Simmons
10. In My Head [1994]	(3:30) Simmons / Scott Van Zen / St. James
11. Carnival of Souls #1 [1994]	(3:44) Simmons / Van Zen
12. Are You a Boy, or Are You a Girl	(2:49) Simmons
13. Say You Don't Want It	(3:29) Simmons
14. Mongoloid Man [1976]	(4:06) Simmons (with Joe Perry of Aerosmith)
15. I Wait	(4:04) Leader / Simmons)

Disc two	Track length and songwriters
1. Weapons	(4:16) Simmons
2. Weapons (Power to Raise the Dead)	(4:13) Simmons / Frehley
3. Hate (Demo)	(4:02) Simmons / Van Zen / Kulick
4. Carnival of Souls #2 (Demo)	(3:15) Simmons / Van Zen
5. Master Of Flash (Street Punk) [1980?]	(3:38) Montgomery
6. Heavy Rain	(3:22) Simmons / Kulick
7. Within (Demo)	(5:58) Simmons
8. In Your Face (Gene Demo)	(1:51) Simmons
9. In Your Face (Ace Re-write Demo)	(3:20) Simmons / Frehley
10. Rain #2	(3:35) Simmons
11. Carnival Intro	(0:32) Simmons
12. I Wanna Live (Demo)	(4:33) Simmons / Cusano
13. If It's Too Hot, You're Too Cold	(3:42) Simmons
14. Rain Keeps Fallin'	(3:22) Simmons
15. Bells of Freedom	(4:37) Simmons

Disc three	Track length and songwriters
1. Christine Sixteen (VH Bros. Demo)	(2:39) Simmons
2. Tunnel of Love (VH Bros. Demo)	(3:32) Simmons
3. Got Love for Sale (VH Bros. Demo)	(3:10) Simmons
4. Hell or High Water (Demo)	(3:08) Simmons / Kulick
5. Domino (Demo)	(3:46) Simmons
6. Mad Dog (Demo)	(2:27) Simmons
7. Only You (Demo)	(4:35) Simmons
8. True Confessions #2	(3:33) Simmons
9. Childhood's End (Demo)	(3:30) Simmons / Kulick / Thayer
10. Burning Up With Fever #2	(3:06) Simmons
11. Good Girl Gone Bad (Demo)	(4:04) Simmons / Sigerson
12. Trial by Fire (Demo)	(3:31) Simmons / Kulick
13. Secretly Cruel (Demo)	(3:46) Simmons
14. Love 'Em and Leave 'Em Yeah (Demo)	(2:18) Simmons
15. Am I Losing My Mind	(2:52) Simmons

Disc four	Track length and songwriters
1. Plaster Caster	(3:39) Simmons
2. X-Ray Eyes	(3:44) Simmons
3. Charisma	(3:18) Simmons / Marks
4. Rockin' in the USA	(2:57) Simmons
5. Radioactive	(3:08) Simmons
6. See You in Your Dreams Tonight	(2:20) Simmons
7. Man of 1000 Faces #1	(3:09) Simmons
8. Man of 1000 Faces #2	(3:32) Simmons
9. Calling Dr. Love	(2:56) Simmons
10. Bad Bad Lovin'	(3:09) Simmons
11. Almost Human	(3:26) Simmons
12. Burning Up With Fever #1	(3:08) Simmons
13. True Confessions #1	(3:34) Simmons
14. Goin' Blind/Little Lady	(3:06) Simmons / Coronel
15. Larger Than Life	(4:06) Simmons
16. It's My Life	(3:51) Simmons / Stanley

Disc five	Track length and songwriters
1. See You Tonite	(2:31) Simmons
2. You're My Reason #2	(3:28) Simmons
3. Always Near You	(2:32) Simmons
4. One More Chance	(3:14) Simmons
5. Now That You're Gone #2 Synth	(3:38) Simmons / Kulick
6. You're My Reason for Living Synth	(4:20) Simmons
7. Dreamer	(3:04) Simmons
8. Na, Na, Na, Na	(2:48) Dylan / Simmons
9. Mr. Make Believe	(2:28) Simmons
10. Now That You're Gone #3	(3:54) Simmons / Kulick
11. Now That You're Gone #1	(3:51) Simmons / Kulick
12. You're My Reason for Living 4 Track	(3:47) Simmons
13. We Are One	(3:03) Simmons
14. Everybody Wants Somebody	(3:28) Dylan / Simmons
15. Bob Dylan and Gene Simmons Writing Session	(15:48)

Disc six	Track length and songwriters
1. Waiting for the Morning Light	(3:56) Dylan / Simmons
2. Is It Real	(0:59) Simmons
3. Are You Real	(2:56) Simmons
4. Something Seems to Happen at Night	(2:37) Mitchell
5. I Believe	(2:36) Simmons
6. Beautiful	(4:06) Addison / Singh
7. Guilty Pleasures	(2:56) Simmons
8. I Dream 1000 Dreams	(3:40) Simmons
9. I Am Yours #1	(4:32) Simmons
10. I Am Yours #2	(2:57) Simmons
11. Love is Blind #1	(2:57) Simmons
12. Love is Blind #2	(2:53) Simmons
13. Whatever Turns You On	(3:03) Williams / Simmons
14. Hold On	(2:53) Simmons
15. First Love	(2:14) Simmons

Disc seven	Track length and songwriters
1. No Conscience	(3:35) Simmons / Poncia
2. Suspicious	(3:22) Thayer / St. James / Regan
3. Everybody Wants	(2:24) Simmons / Damon
4. Promise the Moon	(4:00) Simmons / Kulick / Thayer / St. James
5. All You Want Is a Piece of My Heart	(3:53) Mitchell
6. Pride	(3:11) McCormack / Simmons
7. Mirage	(3:30) Simmons
8. Dog	(3:32) Chuaqui / Simmons
9. If I Had a Gun	(3:27) Chuaqui
10. I Walk Alone	(3:27) Simmons / Kulick
11. Seduction of the Innocent	(5:09) Simmons / Van Zen
12. Lonely Is the Hunter	(3:02) Simmons
13. Never Gonna Leave You #1	(2:22) Simmons
14. I Ain't Comin' Back	(2:57) Simmons
15. Never Gonna Leave You #2	(3:19) Simmons

Disc eight	Track length and songwriters
1. We Rocked All Night	(3:25) Simmons
2. She's Rotten to the Core	(3:33) Simmons / Kulick
3. S&M Love	(2:40) Simmons
4. Sweet & Dirty Love #2	(3:24) Simmons
5. Jelly Roll	(1:54) Simmons
6. Just Gimme Love #2	(3:40) Simmons
7. You Wanted the Best	(3:41) Simmons
8. Just Gimme Love #1	(3:34) Simmons
9. Hit the Ground	(2:10) Simmons
10. Who Said So	(1:55) Simmons
11. Bad Bad Lovin'	(3:15) Simmons
12. I'm Paralyzed	(3:40) Simmons / Ezrin
13. Chrome Heart	(3:36) Simmons / Kulick
14. Till the End of Time	(3:15) Simmons
15. Thou Shalt Not	(3:07) Simmons / Damon

Disc nine	Track length and songwriters
1. It's Gonna Be Alright	(4:30) Simmons / Japp
2. It's Gonna Be Alright #2	(3:15) Simmons / Japp
3. Everybody Knows #1	(3:55) Simmons
4. Everybody Knows #2	(3:45) Simmons
5. You're All That I Want	(4:06) Simmons
6. Kids With Painted Faces	(3:15) Leader / Simmons
7. I Wanna Rule the World	(5:01) Simmons
8. Rule the World #2	(4:08) Simmons / Van Zen
9. Damn, I'm Good	(3:29) Simmons
10. Dial L for Love	(3:42) Simmons / Mitchell / Carr
11. Just Like the Movies #1	(2:45) Simmons / Bishop
12. I Know Who You Are	(3:28) Simmons
13. Sweet Temptation	(2:48) Simmons
14. Are You Always This Hot	(3:01) Simmons / Mitchell
15. Fourever	(3:05) Simmons

Disc ten	Track length and songwriters
1. Take It Like a Man #2	(2:38) Simmons
2. Take It Like a Man #1	(2:44) Simmons
3. Have Mercy, Baby	(4:04) Simmons / Kulick
4. We Won't Take It Anymore	(3:03) Simmons / Carr
5. My Babe	(1:51) Simmons / Carr
6. Eat Your Heart Out	(2:22) Simmons
7. Nine Lives	(3:33) Simmons / Sigerson
8. Howling for Your Love	(2:47) Simmons
9. I Ain't Coming Back	(3:02) Simmons
10. Granny Takes a Trip	(1:55) Simmons
11. Piece of the Rock	(3:48) Simmons / Fleischman
12. Rock It	(2:23) Simmons
13. Sticky Goo	(3:05) Simmons
14. Love Came to Me	(3:25) Simmons
15. Roar of the Greasepaint	(3:07) Simmons

Bonus disc	Track length and songwriters
1. Feel Like Heaven	(3:07) Simmons
2. Obnoxious	(2:37) Simmons
3. Mina'San, Mina'San	(2:13) Simmons
4. Just Begun to Fight	(3:27) Simmons
5. It's Funny, But It Ain't No Joke	(2:32) Simmons
6. Love by Invitation	(3:21) Simmons
7. Dorothy Lamour	(2:31) Simmons
8. Queen of Hearts	(3:14) Simmons / Castro
9. My Lorraine	(1:58) Simmons
10. Leeta	(2:25) Simmons
11. Put on Your Slippers	(2:24) Simmons
12. Gypsy Nights	(2:55) Simmons
13. Eskimo Sun	(3:08) Simmons
14. Nancy	(1:27) Simmons
15. My Uncle Is a Raft	(1:16) Simmons
