= Skatt Brothers =

US musical group

The Skatt Brothers
- Origin: Los Angeles, California
- Genres: Disco, rock
- Years active: 1979–1983
- Labels: Casablanca Records; Polygram
- Past members: Sean Delaney (keyboards); Pieter Sweval (bass); Richard Martin-Ross (guitar); Richie Fontana (drums, guitar); Danny Brant (guitar); David Andez (guitar); Craig Krampf (drums)

The Skatt Bros. (or Skatt Brothers) were a band from Los Angeles, formed in 1979. At first they were compared to bands like the Village People for parallels in music on their first album, but later returned to their more rockish roots with the release of their second album titled Rico and the Ravens, issued in Australia only.

== History ==
Sean Delaney, who had worked closely with KISS, formed the band in 1979. Signed to Casablanca Records by Neil Bogart, the original lineup consisted of Delaney himself as well as Peter Sweval, Richard Martin-Ross, David Andez, Richie Fontana and Craig Krampf. Andez and Krampf were later replaced with Danny Brant.

In 1979, the band released "Walk the Night" (written by Andez and Fontana), on the Strange Spirits album. "Walk the Night," considered a cult classic and the band's most famous release, reached No. 9 in the Dance/Disco list of the U.S. Billboard charts.

In 1980 the band obtained gold record status in Australia for their hit single “Life at the Outpost”. The video for "Life at the Outpost" was generated by their distributing record company in Australia (Polygram/Mercury) who hired dancers/actors to lip-sync the song in the video, thus regarded as a total misrepresentation of the band by their management (Aucoin Management), their fans, and anyone who has seen them perform live in concert. No members of the Skatt Bros. appeared in the video, verified by former band member Richie Fontana.

"Life at the Outpost" managed to sell over 50,000 copies in Australia, earning it an Australian Gold Record award.

In 2010, European music company Premium Series reissued the Strange Spirits album. The reissue claimed to be "24 bit digitally re-mastered from original master tapes".

== Popular culture ==
The band's best-known song, "Walk the Night", appeared on the official soundtrack of the video game Grand Theft Auto IV, released in 2008. According to Rockstar Games, the company thought the song so important to have on the soundtrack that they hired a private investigator to locate Delaney's surviving relatives (he had died in 2003) and secure the rights to include it.

"Walk the Night" is heard in M3GAN during the titular robotic doll's infamous dance.

The North Queensland Cowboys play "Life at the Outpost" through the stadium when they have a win at North Queensland Stadium in Townsville. It also serves as an unofficial victory song for the team.

== Discography ==
=== Albums ===
Year	Title	AUS	Label
1979	Strange Spirits	71	Casablanca Records
1981	Rico and the Ravens	-	Polygram
2010	Strange Spirits (reissue)	-	Premium Series

=== Singles ===
Year	Title	USD	AUS	Label
1979	"Life at the Outpost"	-	13	Casablanca Records
1980	"Walk the Night"	9	95	Casablanca Records
1980	"Dancin' for the Man"	-	-	Casablanca Records
1981	"Rain"	-	-	Mercury Records
1981	"Oh, Those Girls"	-	-	Mercury Records
