= Sean Delaney (musician) =

Musical artist (1945–2003)

- Born: Prentice John Delaney Jr. January 8, 1945; Tempe, Arizona
- Died: April 13, 2003 (aged 58) Utah
- Years active: 1960s–2003
- Formerly of: KISS; Skatt Bros. Sean Delaney and Trust; Natural Juice

Prentice John Delaney Jr. (January 8, 1945 – April 13, 2003), better known as Sean Delaney, was an American musician, producer, road manager and songwriter, best known for his work with the rock band KISS from the early 1970s until the early 1980s. He is largely credited with developing their choreography onstage, and co-wrote many songs with Paul Stanley, including "Mr. Speed", "Makin' Love", and "Take Me" from the 1976 album Rock and Roll Over, and "All American Man" from the studio side of the 1977 album Alive II.

He also co-wrote the song "Rocket Ride" with Ace Frehley for Alive II and the song remained a staple of Frehley's live set throughout his solo career. It was also used as the title of Frehley's 2008 tour. Delaney simultaneously produced and co-wrote songs for Gene Simmons' and Peter Criss' 1978 self-titled solo albums. He co-wrote songs with each original member of Kiss and is often referred to by fans and those close to the band as "the fifth member of KISS."

== Early life ==
Born and raised in Tempe, Arizona, his family moved all around the country. His father, after whom he was named, built a little league field in Cranbury, New Jersey that was named Delaney Field. He attended Pleasant Grove High School. He joined the 101st Airborne and left for the east coast by the late 1960s. Delaney had established himself as the lead singer of several unsuccessful groups in the New York City area. One such group, "Sean Delaney and Trust" signed a recording contract with Elektra Records. Another, a group called "Natural Juice," was signed with Columbia Records after being discovered by Clive Davis. Delaney later formed a company, the "Music Department" with future Kiss management Glickman/Marks associate Howard Marks. Delaney's close relationship with Kiss manager Bill Aucoin (the two were a couple, 1969–80) indubitably played a huge part in the early development of the band, as well as his association with Neil Bogart long before Kiss or Casablanca Records were created.

== KISS ==
According to Delaney, it was he who persuaded Bill Aucoin to go and see the band at the Hotel Diplomat:

Gene had sent us a phony press release and press packet. Listing all the places they had been playing and 'Reviews' of their performances. All were bogus. I remember laughing and telling Bill, 'If they have gone to this extent to get our attention, let's go see them.' And we did.

The date was August 10, 1973. Following that first experience, the band performed a private showcase at La Tang Studios for Delaney, with Neil Bogart (future Casablanca records president), Bill Aucoin (future Kiss manager) and Joyce Biawitz (also a future Kiss manager). Delaney's recollection of the evening tells the story:

I thought it was absolutely the worst thing that could hit, I mean worst. It was so unlike anything that it had to be incredible. It was new, it was something that wasn't being done. ... So try to imagine, in a small rehearsal studio, four guys are up there playing. In front of them are Bill, Neil, Joyce, and myself. They finished the first song and no applause. Gene (Simmons) walks down to Neil Bogart, grabs both of his hands, and makes him applaud ... and Neil started applauding because he was scared to death. And I said to myself at that moment, "This I wanna be involved in" ... because that's the kind of balls you have to have to do anything.

For most of Delaney's tenure with Kiss, he acted in various capacities behind the scenes while the band was on tour. Part choreographer, part roadie and part driver would have been an accurate description for Delaney's job before Kiss became widely commercially successful. In the early days, he coached the band as to how to move onstage with the makeup and costumes on, including several signature moves (such as the swaying guitar moves at the end of "Deuce") that have been a staple of the live set for over 40 years. After the band became a worldwide success, he was afforded several opportunities to produce up-and-coming bands, including Billy Squier's first band Piper in 1977, but perhaps his most well known production credit is for Gene Simmons' 1978 self-titled solo album. He also produced Kiss' first greatest hits compilation Double Platinum, also released in 1978, which included a brand-new version of the Kiss classic "Strutter," dubbed "Strutter '78".

== Songwriting with KISS ==
He was also given the opportunity in 1976 and 1977 to co-write several songs with members of the band, who were now far too busy to keep up with songwriting at the clip they had previously been used to. As mentioned before, the full list of the songs he contributed to the group were:

- "Take Me" (Stanley/Delaney) from the album Rock and Roll Over.
- "Mr. Speed" (Stanley/Delaney) from the album Rock and Roll Over.
- "Makin' Love" (Stanley/Delaney) from the album Rock and Roll Over.
- "All American Man" (Stanley/Delaney) from the album Alive II.
- "Rocket Ride" (Frehley/Delaney) from the album Alive II.

Delaney has also claimed to have co-written the Kiss songs "Love Gun", "I Want You" and "Rock Bottom", although without receiving credit.

== Gene Simmons ==
Delaney was brought in to produce Gene Simmons' album in 1978. In Gene's case, Delaney was asked at the outset to produce the album, and even had a co-writing credit with the song "Living In Sin," featuring notable luminaries Cher and Bob Seger on backup vocals. A big part of the production process was indubitably coordinating schedules between the many notable guest appearances on the album. In addition to the aforementioned stars, Joe Perry, Rick Nielsen, and Donna Summer all appeared on the album among many others.

== Peter Criss ==
Delaney was asked while producing Simmons' solo album to also contribute to Criss' solo venture. Criss was involved in a car accident around this time, and because of this and other behind-the-scenes distractions, he was incapable of getting any new original material together. After delving into the back catalogs of former bands Lips and Chelsea for any remaining material he and Stan Penridge had written, and after sprinkling in a couple of covers, the drummer found himself still short of a full album. Knowing that Delaney had songs that would suit the album, Neil Bogart insisted that Delaney write songs for the album and help Criss see it through to the end of the process. Delaney was initially reluctant because of his involvement with Simmons' album, but Bogart used the solo album Delaney himself was planning on doing as leverage to pressure him into doing it, as Casablanca was slated to be the record label he would ultimately release it on. Delaney wrote "I Can't Stop The Rain" and "Rock Me, Baby" off of Criss' solo album, both of which he also shares production credit for; those two songs and "Easy Thing" (written by Criss/Penridge) were co-produced by Vini Poncia/Peter Criss/Sean Delaney.

The fact that Delaney worked on both albums is remarkable, as all four albums were allegedly closely guarded against each other by each Kiss member and Kiss management, with no other member's (or any individual associated with any of the other four solos) involvement or input. Simmons granted Delaney special dispensation to work on Criss' album, knowing how critical it was for all four to be completed in a timely fashion.

== Solo career ==
Delaney released one solo album in early January 1979, entitled Highway. It features eight original tracks written by Delaney and a cover of the Smokey Robinson song "You Beat Me to the Punch". It is dedicated to Gui (Bill Aucoin) and the four original members of Kiss and has some of the same sessions musicians used on Peter Criss' solo album, including Allen Schwartzberg, who served as the session drummer for Criss while he was recovering from a car accident. Luther Vandross also makes a guest appearance on the LP.

The album's closing song "Dreams" became the title track for Grace Slick's solo album the following year, which also featured Schwartzberg on drums.

The song "Spotlights (And Lonely Nights)" was originally intended to be released by Peter Criss on his 1978 solo album and a recording with him singing was done. However, even after a co-writing credit was negotiated by Casablanca Records it was determined that the song was too dark and unsuitable for a Kiss-related release. Sean essentially replaced Peter's vocal with his own.

== Skatt Bros. ==
After releasing the solo album, Delaney formed a band in 1979 called Skatt Bros. The band was composed of Delaney on keyboards, Pieter Sweval on bass (a member of Starz and Looking Glass), Richard Martin-Ross on guitar, David Andez on guitar, Richie Fontana on Drums and Guitar (a member of Piper and boyfriend of Peter Criss's ex-wife Lydia) and Craig Krampf on drums. This lineup underwent a slight alteration shortly after forming in which Krampf and Andez left and guitarist Danny Brant joined. Delaney had known Fontana from when he had produced the band Piper, who had opened for Kiss on the 1977 Love Gun tour.

The band released two albums: Strange Spirits (Casablanca, 1979) and Rico And The Ravens (Mercury, 1981). The second album was only released in Australia, on the strength of the band's popularity there. In support of the first album, a hilarious Village People inspired video for "Life At The Outpost" was filmed, created by their record company (Polygram Records in Australia), using actors to appear in the video. The members of The Skatt Bros do not appear in the video. The band also released a "sledgehammer version" cover of Elvis' "Don't Be Cruel" (Casablanca NB-2258), backed with "Dancin' For the Man," as a single before disbanding in 1981.

== Other artists ==
Delaney worked with artists other than Kiss as the 1970s progressed, notably acts managed by Bill Aucoin. He co-wrote "(She's Just A) Fallen Angel" and "Monkey Business" on the self titled debut album from Starz, which was produced by Jack Douglas. This band included Peter Sweval on bass (previously with Looking Glass), with whom Delaney would work in the Skatt Brothers "Sing It, Shout It" appeared on Starz's second album Violation.

Delaney co-produced Piper's second album, Can't Wait (A&M Records SP-4654) with Chris Kimsey. Released in 1977 Piper was a band that included Billy Squier. The band included Richie Fontana who later became the drummer in the Skatt Bros.

Delaney produced the self-titled RCA debut album for Toby Beau (also in the Aucoin Management stable) which resulted in the hit single "My Angel Baby". Released in May 1978, Delaney also co-wrote "Broken Down Cowboy," "California," "Moonshine," "Wink Of An Eye," and "Bulldog" for the album.

Delaney's song "Dreams" was recorded by Jefferson Airplane vocalist Grace Slick as the title track of her 1980 album. The recording featured Ron Frangipane who had composed the sinister intro to the song "Radioactive" on Gene Simmons' 1978 solo album.

In 1984, Delaney spent a brief time with The Nylons, a Canadian a cappella group. He was their front-of-house sound engineer while they were touring their self-titled debut album.

In the early 2000s Delaney managed the English country act, Smith & Jackson, he met them while they were on the "Country Thunder USA Tour" in 2002 after the tour Delaney moved to Sunderland in the northeast of England and wrote numerous songs with the pair and assisted in the recordings of their album Rivertown, on R.G.F Records. The Jackson half of the act was Paul Jackson, a one-time vocalist with original Def Leppard guitarist Pete Willis' band Roadhouse. Delaney's death impacted the band who had to start from scratch in their search for a recording deal. The band split shortly after Delaney's death. A while after Sean's untimely death, Bill Aucoin flew Paul Jackson to Nashville to meet and work with multi-hit songwriter KOSTAS. They remain good friends and songwriting partners to this day.

== Death ==
Delaney died on April 13, 2003. A diabetic, Delaney had suffered a series of strokes before his death. Lydia Criss and Bill Aucoin were among those who attended his funeral. Delaney died in Utah and is buried in the city of Orem. On the bottom of the tombstone read the names of Gene, Paul, Ace, and Peter.

Delaney started working on his biography in 1997 and initially titled it "SeanSStory." By 1998 Delaney had changed the title to "Sean Delaney, The Fifth KISS." He suggested that he brought in an investigative reporter to conduct comparative interviews with the cast of characters in the early years to validate his stories. By December 2001, Delaney had essentially completed work on the book and was in active discussions for publication. By 2002 the title had been changed to "Sean Delaney's Hell Box." What was eventually published posthumously was a sparse 118-page work, which was Delaney's work completed by Bryan J. Kinnaird. It was vanity published via Xlibris in 2004.

== See also ==
- Peter Criss (album) - Peter Criss' solo album, for which Sean Delaney was a songwriter.
- Gene Simmons (album) - Gene Simmons solo album, which Sean Delaney co-produced.
