= Rico and the Ravens =

Skatt Brothers' second and final album

Rico And The Ravens

Studio album by Skatt Bros.
- Released: 1981
- Recorded: Amber Studios, Toronto, Canada; 1981
- Genre: Rock
- Label: Polygram Records Pty Limited (Australia)
- Producer: Ian Guenther and Willi Morrison

Rico And The Ravens was the Skatt Brothers' second and final album that was only released in 1981 in Australia, supported by the single "Oh, Those Girls" (Mercury/PolyGram 6180 039) backed with "Heat Of Passion".

== Track listing ==
1. "Runaway" (Martin-Ross)
2. "Kiss Rock 'N' Roll Goodbye" (Sweval)
3. "Oh, Those Girls" (Andez, Sweval)
4. "Rain" (Delaney, Richard Martin-Ross)
5. "If It's Alright" (Fontana)
6. "Heat Of Passion" (Sweval, Andez, Fontana, Delaney)
7. "Eternity" (Delaney)
8. "L.A. Sunshine" (Fontana, Andez, Sweval)
9. "Wait Till Tonight" (Delaney)

== Personnel ==
- Richard Martin-Ross - Guitars/Vocals
- Pieter Sweval - Bass Guitar/Vocals, Acoustic Rhythm Guitar on "Kiss Rock 'N' Roll Goodbye" and "Eternity"
- Sean Delaney - Keyboards/Vocals, Percussion on "L.A. Sunshine"
- Danny Brant - Lead Guitar
- Richie Fontana - Drums, Rhythm Guitar on "If It's Alright" and "L.A. Sunshine"

== Recording ==
- Produced by Ian Guenther and Willi Morrison
- Arranged by The Skatt Bros.
- Recorded at Amber Studios, Toronto, Canada by George Semkiw
- Assisted by Ed Stone, Rick Muszynski
- Mixed by Sean Delaney and Bruce Brown at Albert Studios, Sydney, Australia
- Mastered by Richard Mott at EMI, Sydney, Australia
- Cover photography by Bob Jenkins
