= Brandy (You're a Fine Girl) =

1972 song by Looking Glass

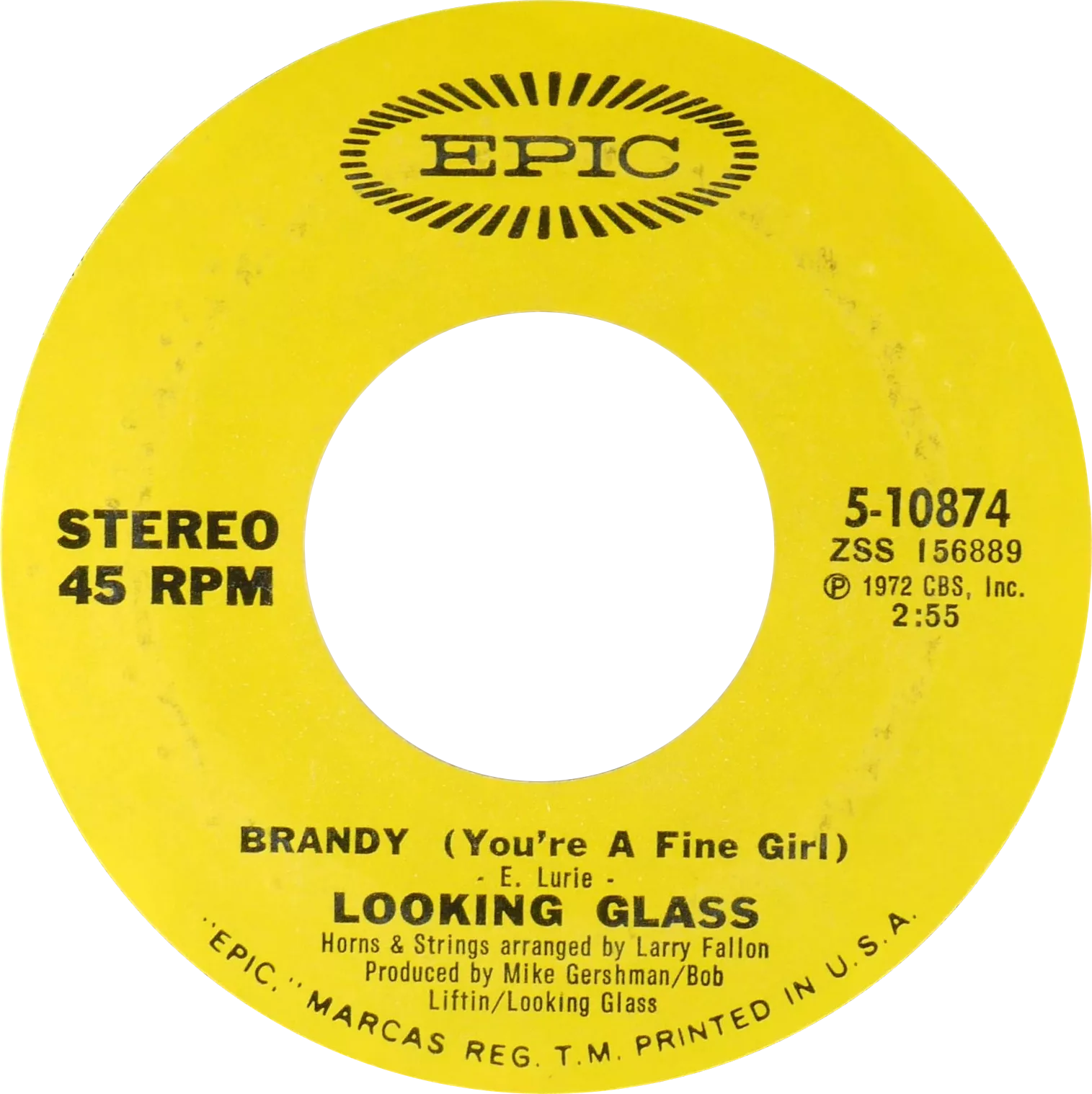
- One of side-A labels of the original US single

Single by Looking Glass

from the album Looking Glass
- B-side: "One by One"
- Released: 1972
- Recorded: 1971
- Genre: Soft rock; pop
- Length: 3:10 (album mix version); 2:55 (single remix/edit)
- Label: Epic
- Songwriter: Elliot Lurie
- Producers: Mike Gershman, Bob Liftin and the Looking Glass

Looking Glass singles chronology
"Golden Rainbow" (1972)	"Brandy (You're a Fine Girl)" (1972)	"Jimmy Loves Mary-Anne" (1973)

Music video
- "Brandy" on YouTube

"Brandy (You're a Fine Girl)" is a 1972 song by American pop rock band Looking Glass from their self-titled debut album. It was written by Looking Glass lead guitarist and co-vocalist Elliot Lurie.

The single reached No. 1 on both the Billboard Hot 100 and Cash Box Top 100 charts.

== Meaning ==
The lyrics tell of Brandy, a barmaid in a busy seaport harbor town which serves "a hundred ships a day." Though lonely sailors flirt with her, she pines for one who has long since left her because he claimed his life, his love, and his lady, was “the sea.”

The urban myth that Brandy was based on Mary Ellis (1750–1828), a spinster in New Brunswick, New Jersey, has been refuted by Lurie himself.

Lurie was thrilled with the deeper meaning given to the song when its lyrics were used as a metaphor by a father explaining his life's choices to his son in the film Guardians of the Galaxy Vol. 2, which came out in 2017.

== Release ==
In February 1972, Robert Mandel was the Epic Records Promotion Manager in Washington, D.C. He received a test pressing of an album by Looking Glass, then a new group. He took the test pressing around to every radio station in the Washington/Baltimore region. At the time, WPGC AM/FM was one of the leading Top 40 stations in the country and was the number one radio station in DC. Harv Moore was the Program Director. He put the song into a one-hour rotation for two days and as Moore related at the time, "the switchboard lit up like a Christmas tree." He said that he had never received a response like that on a record in his 15 years in radio.

Based on the airplay at WPGC and all the other Top 40 stations that followed, Epic rush-released the single of "Brandy". Based on requests alone, two weeks later, when the single finally hit the stores, "Brandy" was the number one record in DC without a single copy yet sold. Other stations around the country started playing it, and it ended up being a number one million seller. A year later when Moore celebrated his 10th Anniversary at WPGC, Looking Glass returned the favor and played at the bash the station held in his honor.

Upon the release of the single, Record World called it "a tuneful, soulful effort deserving of heavy action."

== Influence ==
Following the song's release in 1972, "Brandy" increased in popularity as a girl's name in the United States. According to data from the Social Security Administration, Brandy was the 353rd most popular name in 1971, 140th in 1972, and, in 1973 (the first full year after the song's popularity), 82nd.

Barry Manilow's 1974 "Mandy" was a cover of a song originally titled "Brandy", released in February 1972 by Scott English, but Manilow changed the title following the success of the Looking Glass single, so that the two songs would not be confused.

Shlock Rock's 1999 album, Shlock Rock Meets the Prophets, includes the track "Naomi," which is a parody of the song.

The antagonist of the film Guardians of the Galaxy Vol. 2 refers to the Looking Glass recording as "possibly Earth's greatest composition".

== Personnel ==
- Elliot Lurie — vocals, guitars
- Larry Gonsky — keyboards, backing vocals
- Peter Sweval — bass, backing vocals, cowbell
- Jeff Grob — drums
- Larry Fallon — horns arrangements

== Charts ==
=== Weekly charts ===
Chart (1972)	Peak position
Australian Singles (Kent Music Report)	10
Canada (RPM)	1
Netherlands (Single Top 100)	30
New Zealand (Listener)	5
South Africa (Springbok Radio)	14
US Billboard Hot 100	1
US Billboard Easy Listening	7
US Cash Box Top 100	1

=== Year-end charts ===
Chart (1972)	Peak position
Australian Singles (Kent Music Report)	75
Canada Top Singles (RPM)	26
US Billboard Hot 100	12
US Cash Box Top 100	9

== Certifications ==
Region	Certification	Certified units/sales
United Kingdom (BPI)	Gold	400,000^{‡}
United States (RIAA)	Gold	1,000,000^{^}
^{^} Shipments figures based on certification alone.^{‡} Sales+streaming figures based on certification alone.
