= Elliot Lurie =

American musician (born 1948)

- Born: August 19, 1948 (age 77); New York, New York, U.S.
- Genres: Country rock; soft rock; pop rock
- Occupations: Musician; singer; songwriter
- Instruments: Guitar; vocals
- Spouse: Edi Baker (m. 2015)

Elliot Lurie (born August 19, 1948) is an American musician who was the lead guitarist, songwriter, and co-lead vocalist for the band Looking Glass from 1969 to 1974. He wrote and sang lead on their 1972 #1 hit single "Brandy (You're a Fine Girl)" and their 1973 Top 40 single "Jimmy Loves Mary-Anne".

== Biography ==
Lurie was born in the Brooklyn borough of New York City. He later was a co-founding member of the band Looking Glass, which began formation in 1969 in New Jersey during his college years. After settling on a lineup for the band, the group scored a number one US hit in August 1972 with the song "Brandy (You're a Fine Girl)", their only Top 10 hit. Lurie left the band in 1974 to embark on a solo career, releasing a self-titled album and a single, "Disco (Where You Gonna Go)", on Epic Records. Neither reached the Billboard Top 100. He signed with Arista Records, and wrote songs for Chappell Music and Screen Gems Music.

In the 1980s, Lurie wrote and produced music for private business use. He moved to Los Angeles in 1984, and in 1985, became head of the music department at 20th Century Fox. That year, he produced the soundtrack album for the John Travolta and Jamie Lee Curtis film Perfect. Since then he has worked as music supervisor on several mainstream films, including Alien 3 (1992), A Night at the Roxbury (1998), Riding in Cars with Boys (2001), I Spy (2002) and Spanglish (2004).

In recent years, Lurie has returned to live performing.

=== Personal life ===
Lurie is married to Edi Baker.
