= Richie Ranno =

American musician (born 1950)

Richie Ranno (born January 21, 1950, in Bronx, New York) is an American musician. He is a member of the hard rock band Starz.

== Early life ==
Ranno was raised in Teaneck, New Jersey, where he moved with his family as a child.

== Career ==
After high school Ranno moved to Wisconsin and put together a rock trio, Bungi, consisting of Jon Parrot (of Washington, DC) on bass and Steve Mundt (Appleton, Wisconsin) on drums. The band recorded the single "Six Days on the Road" on the Target label. The record received some airplay in Madison, Wisconsin, and other areas. The band opened for such Midwest locals as Bob Seger, Fuse (later Cheap Trick), REO Speedwagon, Styx and many more.

In 1973 Ranno moved back to Teaneck and shortly after joined the band Stories in September. Stories' "Brother Louie" had just reached #1, and guitarist Steve Love quit to join Jobriath. Ranno was among about 20 guitarists who auditioned for the position. Stories in September continued to tour as a headliner and as an opener for such acts as Black Oak Arkansas, Johnny Winter, The Eagles and others. The band appeared on American Bandstand on April 13, 1973. The band also consisted of vocalist Ian Lloyd, bassist Kenny Aaronson, drummer Bryan Madey, and keyboardist Ken Bichel. After the band split in October 1974, Ranno stayed on with Lloyd's solo project, which included drummer Gregg Diamond, bassist Jim Gregory, and saxophonist/guitarist Ian McDonald (King Crimson). Ranno left in March 1975 and was replaced by Mick Jones (Foreigner). Jones put Foreigner together around this time and recruited McDonald for the band. He also tried to get Lloyd as vocalist, but Lloyd was close to getting a solo recording contract that he eventually did get.

Later in 1975 Ranno auditioned for the band Fallen Angels. He had heard they were managed by Rock Steady/Bill Aucoin who managed Kiss at the time. Ranno was one of about 75 guitarists to audition and quickly landed the position. After a month the band fired the keyboard player and changed their name to Starz. The band immediately began writing and recording demo songs. They also toured with ZZ Top and Peter Frampton.

Starz got their recording deal with Capitol Records in the spring of 1976 and recorded their debut album, Starz, at the Record Plant Studios, considered by some to be the best recording studio in history. Producer Jack Douglas took the band into the studio and made the album, which was supported by a long tour with Aerosmith for a while and Ted Nugent at times.

The band recorded and released their second album, Violation. That album had two hit singles; "Cherry Baby" was a national Top 40 hit, and "Sing It Shout It" went to #65. The first two albums are on Kerrang! magazine's list of the 100 Greatest Heavy Metal Albums of All Time and Hit Parader magazine's Top 100 Rock Albums of All Time. Violation is also listed in Classic Rock magazine's "150 Albums You Must Hear Before You Die" issue.
