= Alive! Tour =

1975–1976 concert tour by Kiss

- Promotional tour by Kiss
- Poster to the concert in Pittsburgh
- Associated album: Alive!
- Start date: September 10, 1975
- End date: March 28, 1976
- No. of shows: 91

Kiss concert chronology
- Dressed to Kill Tour (1975); Alive! Tour (1975–1976); Destroyer Tour (1976)

The Alive! Tour was a concert tour by American rock band Kiss, in support of their 1975 live album Alive!. The tour began on September 10, 1975 and concluded on March 28, 1976.

== History ==
At the Cobo Hall show, Paul Stanley began using Pete Townshend's famous ritual of smashing his guitar, employing it after "Let Me Go, Rock 'n' Roll", until it was eventually done after "Rock and Roll All Nite" in later years.

In the tour program for the band's final tour, Stanley reflected on the tour:

I saw a pattern emerging with us on the road. Every night, I'd ask somebody before the show, "How are we doing?", which meant, "What's the attendance?" One night they said, "It's sold out" and then the next night I'd hear the same thing. All of a sudden it was becoming the norm. For me the first realization that things were on an upswing was when we played the Hara Arena in Dayton, Ohio. Before the show I went on stage, looked out through the curtain and saw this big crowd and said to myself, "My God, this is really happening!"

== Tour dates ==
List of 1975 concerts
Date	City	Country	Venue	Support Act(s)
September 10, 1975	Chattanooga	United States	Chattanooga Memorial Auditorium	Slade
September 11, 1975	Knoxville	United States	Knoxville Civic Coliseum	Slade; Gary Wright
September 12, 1975	Greensboro	United States	Greensboro Coliseum	Slade; Gary Wright
September 13, 1975	Norfolk	United States	Norfolk Scope	Slade; Gary Wright
September 14, 1975	Wilkes-Barre	United States	King's College Gym	Diamond Reo; Slade
October 2, 1975	Syracuse	United States	Onondaga County War Memorial	The James Montgomery Band
October 3, 1975	Upper Darby Township	United States	Tower Theater	Fallen Angel
October 4, 1975	Passaic	United States	Capitol Theatre	Savoy Brown
October 5, 1975	Henrietta	United States	The Dome Center	Black Sheep
October 6, 1975	Allentown	United States	Allentown Memorial Hall	REO Speedwagon
October 9, 1975	Cadillac	United States	Cadillac High School	Double Yellow Line
October 11, 1975	Columbus	United States	Veterans Memorial Auditorium	Black Sheep
October 19, 1975	Orlando	United States	Orlando Sports Stadium	Bob Seger & The Silver Bullet Band; Atlanta Rhythm Section
October 20, 1975	St. Petersburg	United States	Bayfront Center	Bob Seger & The Silver Bullet Band; Atlanta Rhythm Section
October 22, 1975	Birmingham	United States	Boutwell Memorial Auditorium	Bob Seger & The Silver Bullet Band; Atlanta Rhythm Section
October 26, 1975	Montgomery	United States	Garrett Coliseum	Harvest
October 30, 1975	Nashville	United States	Nashville Municipal Auditorium	Bob Seger & The Silver Bullet Band; Montrose
November 1, 1975	St. Louis	United States	Kiel Auditorium	Atlanta Rhythm Section
November 2, 1975	La Crosse	United States	Mary E. Sawyer Auditorium	Brownsville Station
November 6, 1975	San Antonio	United States	San Antonio Municipal Auditorium	Mott
November 7, 1975	Beaumont	United States	McDonald Gym	Mott
November 8, 1975	Arlington	United States	Texas Hall	Mott
November 9, 1975	Houston	United States	Sam Houston Coliseum	Mott
November 12, 1975	Toledo	United States	Toledo Sports Arena	Styx
November 15, 1975	Rockford	United States	Illinois National Guard Armory	Rush
November 16, 1975	Flint	United States	IMA Auditorium	Mott
November 17, 1975	Flint	United States	IMA Auditorium	Rush
November 18, 1975	Port Huron	United States	McMorran Arena	Rush
November 21, 1975	Terre Haute	United States	Hulman Center	Rush
November 22, 1975	Chicago	United States	International Amphitheatre	Mott; The Leslie West Band; Little Feat
November 23, 1975	Evansville	United States	Roberts Municipal Stadium	Rush; Mott
November 26, 1975	Huntington	United States	Veterans Memorial Fieldhouse	Rush; Mott
November 27, 1975	Fayetteville	United States	Cumberland County Memorial Arena	Styx; Mott
November 28, 1975	Ashville	United States	Asheville Civic Center	Styx; Mott
November 29, 1975	Charlotte	United States	Charlotte Park Center	Styx; Mott
November 30, 1975	Landover	United States	Capital Centre	Styx; Mott
December 2, 1975	Columbus	United States	Columbus Municipal Auditorium	Styx
December 3, 1975	Dothan	United States	Houston County Farm Center	Styx
December 5, 1975	Atlanta	United States	The Omni Coliseum	Styx; The Leslie West Band
December 6, 1975	Jacksonville	United States	Jacksonville Memorial Coliseum	Styx; Dixie Dregs
December 12, 1975	Syracuse	United States	Onondaga County War Memorial	Black Sabbath (headliner)
December 14, 1975	Boston	United States	Orpheum Theatre	Black Sheep
December 18, 1975	Waterbury	United States	Palace Theater	Black Sheep
December 19, 1975	Binghamton	United States	Broome County Veterans Memorial Arena	Mott
December 20, 1975	Pittsburgh	United States	Pittsburgh Civic Arena	Rush; Mott
December 21, 1975	Richmond	United States	The Mosque	Rush; Mott
December 27, 1975	Louisville	United States	Louisville Gardens	Styx; Black Sheep; Santa Claus
December 28, 1975	South Bend	United States	Morris Civic Auditorium	Styx
December 29, 1975	Providence	United States	Providence Civic Center	The Leslie West Band
December 31, 1975	Uniondale	United States	Nassau Veterans Memorial Coliseum	Blue Öyster Cult; The Leslie West Band

List of 1976 concerts
Date	City	Country	Venue	Support Act(s)
January 23, 1976	Erie	United States	Erie County Field House	Phillippe
January 25, 1976	Detroit	United States	Cobo Arena	Back Street Crawler
January 26, 1976	Detroit	United States	Cobo Arena	Rory Gallagher
January 27, 1976	Detroit	United States	Cobo Arena	Rory Gallagher
January 30, 1976	Mount Pleasant	United States	Rose Arena	Hot Lucy
January 31, 1976	Trotwood	United States	Hara Arena	The Leslie West Band
February 1, 1976	Richfield	United States	Richfield Coliseum	Hydra
February 4, 1976	Milwaukee	United States	Milwaukee Auditorium	Point Blank
February 5, 1976	Madison	United States	Dane County Expo Coliseum	Point Blank
February 6, 1976	Saint Paul	United States	St. Paul Civic Center Theatre	Point Blank
February 9, 1976	Salt Lake City	United States	Terrace Ballroom	Point Blank
February 11, 1976	Portland	United States	Veterans Memorial Coliseum	Point Blank
February 12, 1976	Spokane	United States	Spokane Coliseum	Point Blank
February 13, 1976	Seattle	United States	Paramount Theatre	Point Blank
February 14, 1976	Seattle	United States	Paramount Theatre	Point Blank
February 16, 1976	Missoula	United States	Adams Fieldhouse	Point Blank
February 23, 1976	Inglewood	United States	The Forum	Montrose
February 24, 1976	Inglewood	United States	The Forum	Montrose
February 26, 1976	San Bernardino	United States	Swing Auditorium	Montrose; Point Blank
February 27, 1976	San Diego	United States	San Diego Sports Arena	Montrose
February 29, 1976	Honolulu	United States	Honolulu International Center	Booga Booga
March 4, 1976	Oklahoma City	United States	Civic Center Music Hall	Mountain Smoke
March 6, 1976	Lincoln	United States	Pershing Auditorium	Boz Scaggs
March 8, 1976	Tulsa	United States	Tulsa Convention Center	Mountain Smoke
March 11, 1976	Huntsville	United States	Von Braun Civic Center	Albatross
March 12, 1976	New Orleans	United States	The Warehouse	Van Wilkes
March 13, 1976	Mobile	United States	Mobile Expo Hall	Dr. Feelgood
March 14, 1976	Memphis	United States	Ellis Auditorium	Target
March 20, 1976	Lakeland	United States	Lakeland Civic Center	.38 Special
March 21, 1976	Miami	United States	Miami Jai-Alai Fronton Arena	.38 Special
March 24, 1976	Philadelphia	United States	Philadelphia Civic Center	The Rockets
March 25, 1976	Johnstown	United States	Cambria County War Memorial Arena	Thee Image
March 26, 1976	Harrisburg	United States	State Farm Show Arena	Artful Dodger
March 27, 1976	Utica	United States	Utica Memorial Auditorium	Artful Dodger
March 28, 1976	Springfield	United States	Springfield Civic Center	Artful Dodger

=== Box office score data ===
List of box office score data with date, city, venue, attendance, gross, references
Date (1976)	City	Venue	Attendance	Gross	Ref(s)
March 4	Oklahoma City, United States	Civic Center Music Hall	3,200	$18,100	
March 11	Huntsville, United States	Von Braun Civic Center	9,559	$52,944	
March 14	Memphis, United States	Ellis Auditorium	4,361	$26,166	

== Personnel ==
- Paul Stanley – vocals, rhythm guitar
- Gene Simmons – vocals, bass
- Peter Criss – drums, vocals
- Ace Frehley – lead guitar, backing vocals
