= Bojangles Coliseum =

Multi-purpose indoor arena in Charlotte, North Carolina, US

Coordinates: 35°12′18.59″N 80°47′42.37″W

- The Big I/The Old Coliseum/The Biscuit
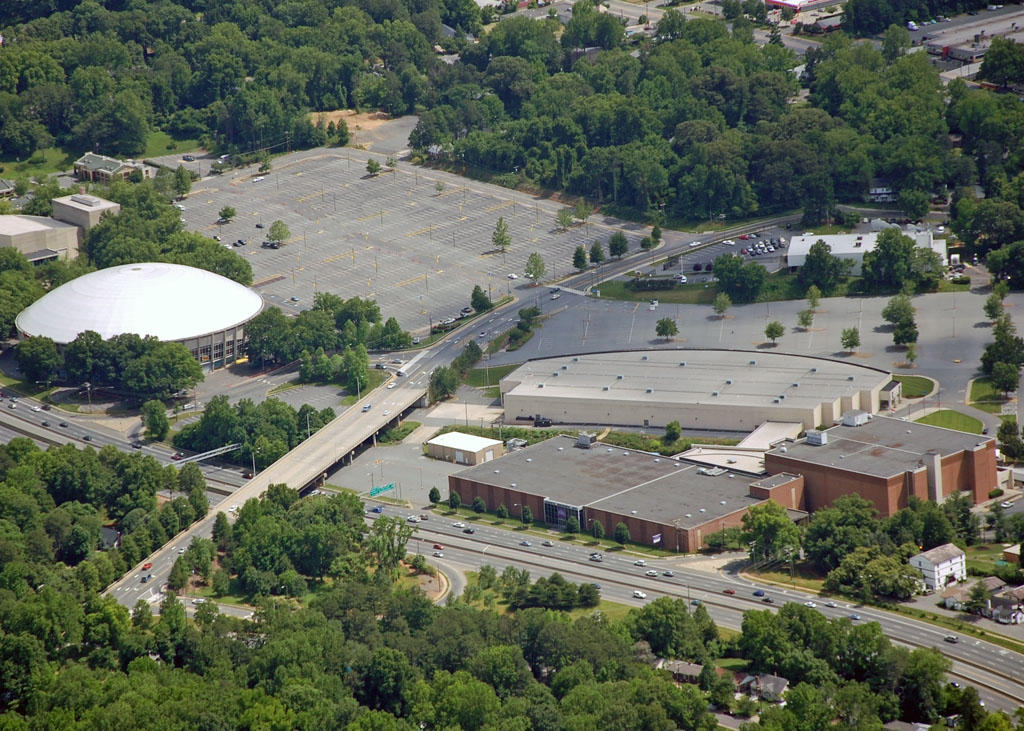

- Location within North Carolina Location within the United States
- Former names: Charlotte Coliseum (1955–1988); Independence Arena (1993–2001); Cricket Arena (2001–2008)
- Address: 2700 East Independence Boulevard
- Location: Charlotte, North Carolina, U.S.
- Owner: City of Charlotte
- Operator: Charlotte Regional Visitors Authority
- Capacity: 8,600 (2015–present); 9,605 (1993–2015); 10,000-14,000 (1955–1988)
- Scoreboard: Daktronics 12.5' x 22' (main screens), 2' x 22' (auxiliary displays)
- Field size: 99' x 212'
- Public transit: CATS: 27

Construction
- Built: 1953–1955
- Opened: 1955
- Renovated: 1988–1993, 1995, 2015–2016
- Expanded: 1970, 1992
- Closed: 1988
- Reopened: 1993
- Cost: $4 million for the Coliseum and Ovens Auditorium ($48.1 million in 2025 dollars)
- Architects: A. G. Odell Jr. & Associates of Charlotte, NC
- Project manager: James C. Hemphill Jr.
- Structural engineers: Severud, Elstad and Krueger of New York, NY
- General contractors: Thompson and Street Company of Charlotte, NC
- Main contractors: Structural steel fabrication and erection: Southern Engineering Company of Charlotte, NC

Tenants
- Carolina Cougars (ABA) (1969–74); Charlotte Checkers (EHL/SHL) (1960–77); Charlotte 49ers (NCAA) (1976–88, 1993–96); Carolina Vipers (CISL) (1994); Charlotte Rage (AFL) (1995); Charlotte Cobras (MILL) (1996); Charlotte Checkers (ECHL) (1993–2005); Arena Racing USA (2006–08); Charlotte Roller Girls (WFTDA) (2008–09); Carolina Speed (AIFA/SIFL) (2009, 2011); Charlotte Copperheads (PLL) (2012); Charlotte Checkers (AHL) (2015–present); Charlotte Thunder (AAL/APFL) (2021–22); Charlotte Crown (UpShot League) (2026)

Website
- www.boplex.com/our-venues/bojangles-coliseum

Bojangles Coliseum, (Note: Bojangles' Coliseum (with trailing apostrophe) prior to August 2020, see § Spelling change) originally Charlotte Coliseum and formerly Independence Arena and Cricket Arena, is a 10,829-seat multi-purpose arena located in Charlotte, North Carolina. It is operated by the Charlotte Regional Visitors Authority, which also oversees nearby Ovens Auditorium and the uptown Charlotte Convention Center. The title sponsor is Bojangles, a restaurant chain founded and headquartered in Charlotte. The building's signature domed roof is made of tin, rather than steel or iron. The dome spans 332 feet in diameter and rises to 112 feet tall.

== History ==
=== 20th century ===
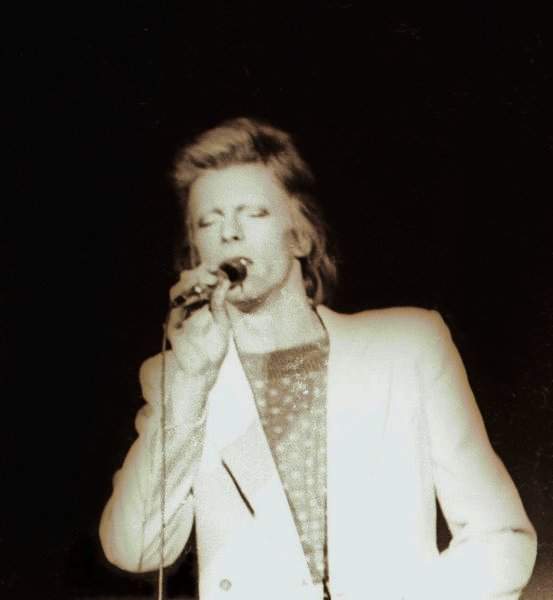
David Bowie performing at the coliseum in October 1974

Construction began on the Coliseum in 1953 after some delays. Arthur G. Odell Jr., of A. G. Odell Jr. & Associates. served as project designer, his first major project. James C. Hemphill Jr. oversaw the project. Another important Charlotte figure of the time, Frederick Thompson of FN Thompson Construction, had the daunting, yet, highly successful task of building the coliseum.

In September 1955, the building was opened and dedicated by Billy Graham as the Charlotte Coliseum. At the time, it was the largest unsupported dome in the world and notably was the first free-spanning dome in the United States. Numerous newspapers and architectural magazines ran stories about the building over the following years, especially its dome. Total evacuation time for the entire structure was just four minutes, while seating capacity could be anywhere between 10,000 and 14,000 seats, approximately, depending on the event.

The Coliseum hosted numerous acts and events over its first few decades. A Billy Graham Crusade took place at the Coliseum in 1958. Elvis Presley first performed at the Coliseum in 1956; his last performance there was in 1977. Elvis was one of numerous musical acts to perform at the Coliseum during this time. In 1958, a massive storm went through the region, damaging the Coliseum's roof. However, the roof held up despite the damage. In 1970, a new north entrance was added. Due to its location, visitors walked onto the building's upper concourse after purchasing their tickets. This entrance is still used today.

After the new Charlotte Coliseum opened in 1988, the original Coliseum was briefly shuttered since the new building effectively took over all the original Coliseum's duties. However, it came quickly back into use when it became clear the new Coliseum, which could host over 24,000 for basketball, was ill-suited for smaller and mid-sized concerts and events. Over the next five years, an extensive refurbishment was made to the structure. This included technology, infrastructure, and accessibility upgrades.

Once reopened in 1993, it was considered as an alternative to the larger Coliseum for events that required less seating or overall space. An expansion franchise in the East Coast Hockey League, the Charlotte Checkers (named in honor of the original Checkers team that played at the Coliseum from 1956 to 1977), became the building's primary tenant. It also got its first name change that same year to Independence Arena. Color TVs were installed inside the concourse and a small restaurant opened for select fans in 1995. In 2001, the arena was renamed Cricket Arena in a naming rights arrangement with Cricket Communications.

=== 21st century ===
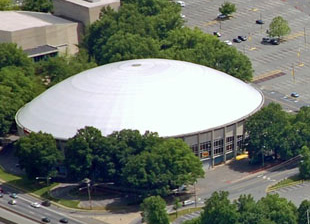
Bojangles' Coliseum in 2007

In 2005, the Checkers departed Cricket Arena for the newly opened Charlotte Bobcats Arena, now Spectrum Center. Due to this, the Coliseum was left without a permanent tenant for a decade. The building remained open as a venue for medium-sized concerts and stage shows which would not be suitable for the Spectrum, as well as high school and some college sporting events, along with local attractions. In 2008, Bojangles Restaurants, Inc., based in Charlotte, bought the naming rights.

Questions about the building's future would arise in the years that followed, due to its age and lack of events. In 2012, the city of Charlotte began considering renovating the building itself as a multi-use sports complex. Two years later, another plan was announced with developer GoodSports that would add both a hotel and sports complex next to the Coliseum. Both plans ultimately fell through.

In November 2014, the arena secured a permanent tenant once again when a third Checkers franchise, now in the American Hockey League, announced a tentative agreement with the Charlotte Regional Visitors' Authority to return to Bojangles' Coliseum for the 2015–2016 season. The Spectrum had poor sight lines for hockey. This franchise had taken the place of the ECHL Checkers four years earlier. The agreement was pending a Charlotte City Council vote to approve $16 million in funding for renovations in conjunction with the Checkers' return and that December, the city approved the $16 million needed. The renovations would include many modern amenities. This would be the Coliseum's first major renovation since the 1988 refurbishment.

Almost a year to the day when the Checkers announced their return to the Coliseum, the renovations were completed and unveiled to the public. Aside from the new seats and score/video boards, other additions also included a sound system (replacing the one used since 1955), locker rooms, a restaurant, updated concessions and repainting the interior.

The Coliseum celebrated its 60th anniversary in 2015. Additional renovations were made in 2016, including upgraded heating/cooling, new internal lighting, and replacing the ice floor among other improvements. In 2018, the city of Charlotte broke ground on a structure to connect the Coliseum to Ovens Auditorium, which was completed in 2020.

In August 2020, "Bojangles' Famous Chicken 'n Biscuits" removed the apostrophe from its name, and removed the words "Famous Chicken 'n Biscuits" from its logo, becoming simply "Bojangles". Mirroring this, the venue now uses the name Bojangles Coliseum (without a trailing apostrophe) in its communications.

== Sports ==
=== Basketball ===
During its days as the Charlotte Coliseum, the arena was one of the homes for the Carolina Cougars of the American Basketball Association from 1969 to 1974. The Cougars became tenants after the Houston Mavericks moved to North Carolina in 1969. The Cougars were a "regional franchise," playing home games in Charlotte (Charlotte Coliseum), Greensboro (Greensboro Coliseum), Winston-Salem Memorial Coliseum and Raleigh (Dorton Arena). Hall of Fame coach Larry Brown began his coaching career with the Cougars in 1972. Billy Cunningham was the ABA MVP for the Cougars in the 1972–73 season. Despite a strong fan base, the Cougars were sold and moved to St. Louis in 1974.

The arena hosted the ACC men's basketball tournament from 1968 to 1970, the Southern Conference men's basketball tournament from 1964 to 1971 (and again in 2010 for the tournament's first three days), and was the site of the Sun Belt Conference men's basketball tournament from 1977 to 1980. Overall, the Coliseum has held no fewer than 15 tournaments between the three conferences and has also hosted 13 NCAA Tournaments. The Coliseum hosted the Charlotte 49ers basketball teams from 1976 to 1988, and again from 1993 to 1996. In 2017, the first two rounds of the CIAA men's and women's basketball tournaments were played at the Coliseum. This marked the 29th college tournament played at the building. In 2022, the Coliseum hosted the Big South Conference men's and women's basketball tournaments, which it hosted again in 2023.

=== Hockey ===
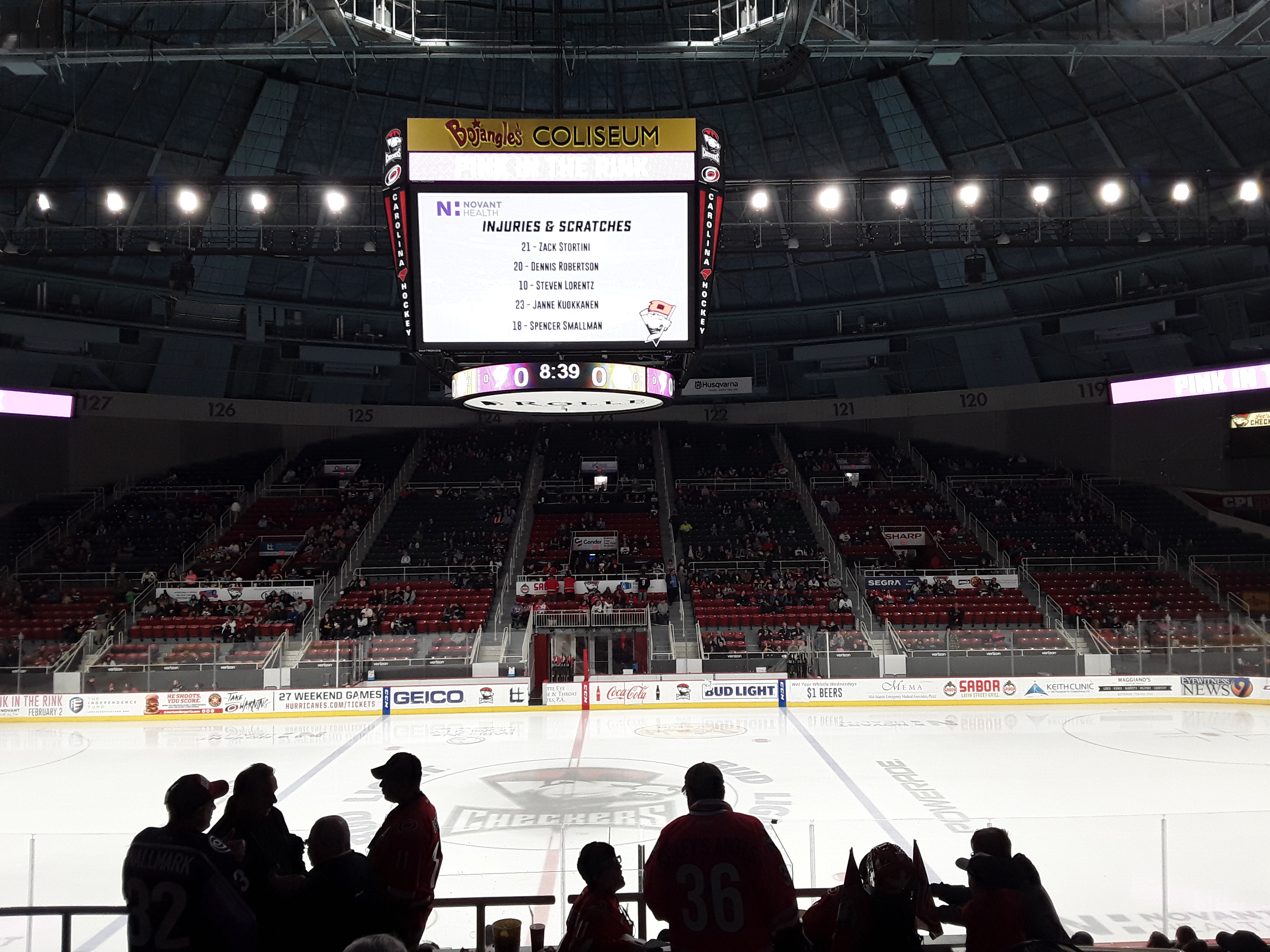
The arena before a Charlotte Checkers game in 2019

Before the third iteration of the Checkers (AHL) returned in 2015, Bojangles' was the home of minor league hockey for many years prior. The first instance started in 1956, when the Baltimore Clippers moved to Charlotte to become the first iteration of the Checkers. The building hosted its first hockey match in January 1956 before a sold-out crowd of over 10,000. The club lasted until 1977, when they folded. In 1993, the ECHL version of the Checkers started and won a championship in 1996. The second iteration of the Checkers played at the Coliseum until 2005, when the franchise surrendering its licence to the ECHL in 2010, when the Carolina Hurricanes moved their AHL franchise from Albany (NY), creating the third iteration. The Coliseum would have been available to host playoff games in either the ECHL or AHL during the following decade (due to possible scheduling conflicts with Spectrum), but this never occurred as the Bobcats (as the NBA team was called) never made the playoffs during the time (the current Charlotte NBA franchise, which began in 2004, has never won a playoff series).

==== Notable games ====
- On January 17, 2018, the Coliseum was in the media spotlight when the Checkers hosted the Bridgeport Sound Tigers in an empty arena. With winter weather blanketing Charlotte, the team warned fans to stay away and the game went on as scheduled.
- Bojangles Coliseum was the site of the longest game in American Hockey League history on May 10, 2018. The Checkers lost to the Lehigh Valley Phantoms 2–1 in five overtimes.

=== Other sports ===
The Carolina Speed of the American Indoor Football Association, formerly playing at the Cabarrus Arena & Events Center, moved to the Coliseum in 2009. After the season, they announced they would be sitting out the 2010 season and resuming play in 2011 back in Cabarrus. They returned in 2011 to the Coliseum, this time as a member of the Southern Indoor Football League, and remained until 2013.

The arena also hosted the worst team in MILL history, the 1996 Charlotte Cobras (0–10). The 1996 season was their one and only in the MILL and the team folded without ever winning a game. In 2012, the arena was home to the Charlotte Copperheads of the now defunct Professional Lacrosse League.

An indoor soccer team, the Carolina Vipers, played their one and only season in the CISL in summer 1994. The team went 3–25 and then went "inactive" for 1995, never to return. The Vipers averaged 3,034 fans per game in their one season.

The Coliseum hosted both NWA Wrestling and Mid-Atlantic Championship Wrestling from the 1970s to the 1990s. WCW also held numerous wrestling events there, including the tenth anniversary of Starrcade, the company's premier event of the year, and the 1997 Slamboree. Additionally, the building hosted UFC Fight Night: Florian vs. Gomi on March 31, 2010. All Elite Wrestling aired an episode of AEW Dynamite that was broadcast live from the venue on November 6, 2019. AEW also held Fight for the Fallen on July 28, 2021, and Battle of the Belts on January 8, 2022, at the venue.

The Charlotte Roller Girls roller derby league played their home bouts at the arena from 2008 to 2009 before moving to the Grady Cole Center.

== Concerts and other events ==
Bojangles' Coliseum has been the site for numerous concerts, shows, and various events throughout its lifespan. It has been the site for the Spring Commencement ceremonies of Johnson C. Smith University (JCSU) for several years. JCSU uses the Coliseum because it offers more seating and parking capacity than their own on-campus facilities. The Coliseum also hosted the graduation ceremony for the Charlotte campus of the University of Phoenix. In addition, the UNC-Charlotte, Central Piedmont Community College and many local high schools have held and currently hold graduation ceremonies at the building. The Mecklenburg County Public Health Department utilized the Coliseum complex, otherwise unused during the COVID-19 pandemic, as its primary mass vaccination site.

List of concerts and events
Artist	Event	Date	Opening act(s)
3 Doors Down		December 12, 2008	Switchfoot; American Bang
AC/DC	Highway to Hell Tour	September 29, 1979	—N/a
AC/DC	Back in Black Tour	August 8, 1980	Nantucket
AC/DC	Fly on the Wall Tour	November 8, 1985	Yngwie Malmsteen
A Perfect Circle	Spring 2004 US Tour	May 14, 2004	The Mars Volta; Burning Brides
Aerosmith	Rocks Tour	May 12, 1976	—N/a
Aerosmith	Night in the Ruts Tour	December 16, 1979	.38 Special; Mother's Finest
Aerosmith	Night in the Ruts Tour	January 27, 1980	.38 Special
Aerosmith	Done with Mirrors Tour	April 4, 1986	Ted Nugent
Aerosmith	Permanent Vacation Tour	March 25, 1988	White Lion
Alabama		February 20, 1982	Janie Fricke
Alabama		February 19, 1983	Janie Fricke
Alabama		February 17, 1984	—N/a
Alabama		January 19, 1985	Bill Medley
Alice Cooper	Billion Dollar Babies Tour	March 18, 1973	—N/a
Alice Cooper	Welcome to My Nightmare Tour	April 12, 1975	—N/a
Alice Cooper	Raise Your Fist and Yell Tour	January 30, 1988	Motörhead
The Allman Brothers Band		January 18, 1976	The Charlie Daniels Band
The Allman Brothers Band		November 27, 1980	Atlanta Rhythm Section
Aventura	The Final Tour	July 8, 2010	—N/a
The Avett Brothers	I and Love Promo Tour	August 8, 2009	Brett Dennen
The Avett Brothers	The Avett Brothers 2011	April 9, 2011	Grace Potter and the Nocturnals
Barbara Mandrell		August 13, 1982	Ricky Skaggs
Barenaked Ladies	Everywhere For Everyone Tour	March 7, 2004	Howie Day & Butterfly Boucher
Barry Manilow	Tour 1981	October 30, 1981	—N/a
Barry Manilow	Paradise Tour	December 2, 1984	—N/a
Barry Manilow	Manilow Live	March 31, 2000	—N/a
The Beach Boys		December 31, 1964	The Monarchs
The Beach Boys		July 14, 1965	The Roemans; The Galaxies
The Beach Boys		April 6, 1975	Billy Joel
The Beach Boys		November 13, 1977	—N/a
The Beach Boys		October 3, 1985	The Dog Night
The Black Keys	El Camino Tour	March 24, 2012	Arctic Monkeys
Black Sabbath	Heaven & Hell Tour	September 26, 1980	Riot & Jessie Bolt
Black Sabbath	Mob Rules Tour	February 26, 1982	Doc Holliday & Molly Hatchet
Blue Öyster Cult	Tour 1981	October 2, 1981	Foghat & Whitford/St. Holmes
Blue Öyster Cult		March 9, 1984	Aldo Nova
Billy Idol	Rebel Yell Tour	May 9, 1984	—N/a
Billy Joel	An Innocent Man Tour	February 8, 1984	—N/a
Bob Dylan	Bob Dylan and the Band 1974 Tour	January 17, 1974	The Band
Bob Dylan	Bob Dylan World Tour 1978	December 10, 1978	—N/a
Bob Dylan	Never Ending Tour 2002	February 10, 2002	—N/a
Bob Seger & The Silver Bullet Band		March 22, 1980	—N/a
Bob Seger & The Silver Bullet Band	The Distance Tour	February 24, 1983	The John Hall Band
Bob Seger & The Silver Bullet Band		February 3, 1996	—N/a
Bon Jovi	7800 Fahrenheit Tour'	October 26, 1985	Ratt
Bon Jovi	Slippery When Wet Tour	September 26, 1986	.38 Special
Bon Jovi	Slippery When Wet Tour	March 25, 1987	Cinderella
Bon Jovi	Crush Tour	November 3, 2000	—N/a
Bo Diddley		January 31, 1956	Bill Haley & His Comets
Bo Diddley		June 14, 1957	—N/a
Bo Diddley	Bo Diddley in the Spotlight Tour	April 18, 1960	—N/a
Bo Diddley	Bo Diddley in the Spotlight Tour	September 13, 1960	—N/a
Boston	Boston Tour	February 15, 1977	Starcastle
Boston	Don't Look Back Tour	January 17, 1979	—N/a
Boz Scaggs		December 17, 1977	Player
Brian McKnight, Joe & Sunshine Anderson		May 26, 2007	—N/a
Brian McKnight		May 26, 2007	—N/a
Bryan Adams	You Want It You Got It Tour	March 27, 1982	Foreigner
Bryan Adams	Reckless Tour	May 17, 1985	—N/a
Bryan Adams	Into The Fire Tour	May 27, 1987	—N/a
Bryan Adams	Waking Up The World Tour	April 9, 1992	The Storm
Bruce Springsteen & The E Street Band	Darkness Tour	August 2, 1978	—N/a
Bruce Springsteen & The E Street Band	Born in the U.S.A. Tour	January 15, 1985	—N/a
Bruce Springsteen & The E Street Band	Born in the U.S.A. Tour	January 16, 1985	—N/a
Buddy Holly & The Crickets		January 8, 1958	—N/a
Buddy Holly & The Crickets		November 23, 1958	—N/a
Bush	Spring 1997 North American Tour	April 4, 1997	Veruca Salt
Cameo		October 3, 1981	—N/a
Carl Perkins		September 20, 1969	—N/a
Casting Crowns		March 3, 2006	Nichole Nordeman
Casting Crowns	The Altar and the Door Tour	March 29, 2008	Leeland; John Waller
Casting Crowns	Until the Whole World Hears Tour	October 17, 2009	Matt Redman
Casting Crowns	Come to the Well Tour	March 10, 2012	Matthew West, Royal Tailor & Lindsay McCaul
Casting Crowns	Thrive Tour	March 7, 2014	for KING AND COUNTRY; Laura Story
CeCe Winans		October 28, 2006	Donnie McClurkin
CeCe Winans		October 29, 2006	Donnie McClurkin
Celtic Thunder	A New Journey Tour	November 8, 2008	—N/a
The Chainsmokers		October 31, 2016	—N/a
Charlie Wilson		May 14, 2011	—N/a
The Charlotte Blues Festival		March 14, 2008	—N/a
The Charlotte Firefighters Benefit Concerts		April 28, 2012	—N/a
The Charlotte Firefighters Benefit Concerts		October 27, 2012	—N/a
The Charlotte Spring Jam		March 21, 2015	—N/a
Cheap Trick		January 9, 1981	—N/a
Cheap Trick	One on One Tour	August 21, 1982	—N/a
The Cheetah Girls	The Party's Just Begun Tour	October 14, 2006	Hannah Montana; Everlife
Chris Brown	Exclusive Tour	January 19, 2008	Bow Wow; Soulja Boy
Chris Tomlin		November 13, 2007	—N/a
Chris Tomlin	Hello Love Tour	April 2, 2009	Israel & New Breed
Chuck Berry		April 4, 1957	—N/a
Chuck Berry		September 21, 1957	Fats Domino; Buddy Holly & The Crickets
Chuck Berry		November 23, 1957	—N/a
Collin Raye		October 30, 2010	—N/a
Conway Twitty		October 9, 1982	Ronnie McDowell
Creedence Clearwater Revival		July 19, 1971	Bo Diddley; Tower of Power
The Cult	The Electric Tour	July 30, 1987	—N/a
The Cult		February 14, 1992	Lenny Kravitz
The Dave Clark Five	1965 North American Tour	July 23, 1965	The Spontaneous
The Dave Clark Five	1965 North American Tour	December 6, 1965	—N/a
The Dave Clark Five	1965 North American Tour	July 15, 1966	—N/a
David Cassidy		April 30, 1972	—N/a
David Crowder Band	Illuminate Tour	November 13, 2004	Shawn McDonald
David Crowder Band	Church Music Tour	November 18, 2009	Seabird & Danyew
David Crowder Band	7 Tour	November 1, 2011	Gungor, Chris August, & John McMillian
David Lee Roth	Eat 'Em and Smile Tour	August 18, 1986	Cinderella
David Lee Roth	Skyscraper Tour	June 28, 1988	Poison *
Debbie Gibson	Electric Youth World Tour	February 28, 1989	Judson Spence
Deep Purple	Burn World Tour	March 10, 1974	—N/a
Def Leppard	High 'n' Dry World Tour	September 18, 1981	—N/a
Def Leppard	Pyromania World Tour	March 19, 1983	—N/a
Def Leppard	Hysteria World Tour	December 20, 1987	Tesla
Dierks Bentley	Locked & Loaded Tour	November 1, 2007	Jack Ingram
Dio	Last in Line Tour	November 7, 1984	Dokken
Dio	Sacred Heart Tour	September 27, 1985	Rough Cutt
Dio	Dream Evil World Tour	January 14, 1988	Megadeth & Savatage
Donald Trump		March 2, 2020	—N/a
Donald Trump		July 24, 2024	—N/a
The Doobie Brothers	1974 Tour	May 4, 1974	—N/a
The Doobie Brothers	1975 Tour	October 16, 1975	—N/a
The Doobie Brothers	1977 Tour	July 30, 1977	—N/a
The Doobie Brothers	1978 Tour	December 16, 1978	—N/a
The Doodlebops	Doodlebops Live! 2007	April 19, 2007	—N/a
Dr. Hook	Pleasure and Pain Tour	January 31, 1979	Sha Na Na
Duran Duran	The Strange Behaviour Tour	July 12, 1987	Erasure
Eagles	The Long Run Tour	November 1, 1979	—N/a
Earth, Wind & Fire	All 'n All Tour	January 8, 1978	—N/a
Elton John	Leggs Larry Tour	November 16, 1972	—N/a
Elton John	Louder Than Concorde Tour	July 14, 1976	—N/a
Elton John	1980 World Tour	September 18, 1980	—N/a
Elton John	Breaking Hearts Tour	November 8, 1984	—N/a
Elvis Presley		June 26, 1956	—N/a
Elvis Presley		April 13, 1972	—N/a
Elvis Presley		March 9, 1974 (2 shows)	—N/a
Elvis Presley		March 20, 1976 (2 shows)	—N/a
Elvis Presley		February 20, 1977	—N/a
Elvis Presley		February 21, 1977	—N/a
Emerson, Lake & Palmer	Works Tour '77	June 29, 1977	—N/a
Emmylou Harris	Down from the Mountain Tour	July 13, 2002	Alison Krauss & Patty Loveless
Eric Clapton	There's One in Every Crowd Tour	June 20, 1975	Santana
Eric Clapton	American Tour '78	March 24, 1978	John Martyn
Eric Clapton	Tour 1982	June 23, 1982	—N/a
Fall Out Boy	Black Clouds and Underdogs Tour	May 2, 2006	The All-American Rejects, Hawthorne Heights, From First to Last & October Fall
Fall Out Boy	Believers Never Die Tour Part Deux	April 24, 2009	Cobra Starship, All Time Low, Hey Monday & 50 Cent
Fantasia Barrino	Side Effects of You Tour	September 28, 2013	112
Flashback: The Classic Rock Experience		September 12, 2008	—N/a
Foghat	Fool the City Tour	June 5, 1975	Blue Öyster Cult & Thee Image
Foghat	1977 Tour	May 21, 1977	Whitesnake
Foghat	Stone Blue Tour	May 11, 1978	—N/a
Foghat	Tight Shoes Tour	October 9, 1980	Outlaws
Foo Fighters	Echoes, Silence, Patience & Grace Tour	October 5, 2007	The Hi–Fi Hand Grenades
Foreigner	Head Games Tour	November 24, 1979	—N/a
Furthur	2010 Winter Tour	February 10, 2010	—N/a
The Gap Band	The Gap Band Tour	April 3, 1979	Mass Production, McFadden & Whitehead, Anita Ward & Five Special
Gino Vannelli		March 8, 1979	—N/a
Glen Campbell	1969 Tour	June 15, 1969	—N/a
Grateful Dead	Fall East Coast Tour '73	December 10, 1973	Casey Jones
Grateful Dead	1979 Tour	May 3, 1979	—N/a
Grateful Dead	1984 Tour	October 5, 1984	—N/a
Grateful Dead	1985 Tour	December 28, 1985	—N/a
Green Day	American Idiot World Tour	April 20, 2005	My Chemical Romance
Hank Williams Jr.	Five-O Tour	August 3, 1985	John Anderson
Hank Williams Jr.	Montana Cafe Tour	August 16, 1986	Marie Osmond
Hawk Nelson		November 30, 2007	—N/a
Hawk Nelson		December 1, 2007	—N/a
Hawk Nelson		January 25, 2008	Natalie Grant and KJ-52
Hawk Nelson		January 26, 2008	Natalie Grant and KJ-52
Heart	Bebe le Strange Tour	May 12, 1980	—N/a
Heart	Private Audition Tour	September 18, 1982	John Mellencamp
Hilary Duff	Most Wanted Tour	August 7, 2004	Haylie Duff
Hillsong United		September 15, 2012	—N/a
Hillsong United		August 16, 2014	—N/a
Honda Civic Tour	2002 Honda Civic Tour; Incubus	June 25, 2002	Hoobastank & Phantom Planet
Honda Civic Tour	2003 Honda Civic Tour; New Found Glory & Good Charlotte	May 6, 2003	Hot Rod Circuit, Less Than Jake, MxPx, Stretch Arm Strong, The Movielife, & The Disasters
Honda Civic Tour	2005 Honda Civic Tour; Maroon 5	March 22, 2005	Phantom Planet, The Donnas & The Thrills
The Hooters	Nervous Nights Tour	February 9, 1986	—N/a
Humble Pie	Eat It Tour	July 24, 1973	Leslie West
Iron Maiden	World Piece Tour	October 20, 1983	Quiet Riot
Iron Maiden	World Slavery Tour	February 8, 1985	—N/a
Iron Maiden	Somewhere on Tour	April 4, 1987	Waysted
Iron Maiden	Seventh Tour of a Seventh Tour	August 9, 1988	Dangerous Toys
The Isley Brothers		January 13, 2012	Lenny Williams, Miki Howard & Calvin Richardson
The J. Geils Band		August 3, 1973	Loggins & Messina, Blue Öyster Cult & Brownsville Station
The Jackson 5	The Jackson 5 First National Tour	December 27, 1970	—N/a
The Jackson 5	The Jackson 5 Second National Tour	July 20, 1971	Commodores
The Jackson 5	The Jackson 5 US Tour	July 8, 1972	—N/a
The Jacksons	Triumph Tour	July 25, 1981	—N/a
Jackson Browne	Lawyers in Love Tour	August 7, 1983	—N/a
Jerry Lee Lewis		August 23, 1958	—N/a
Jerry Lee Lewis		June 3, 1959	—N/a
Jerry Lee Lewis		June 24, 1972	—N/a
Jerry Lee Lewis		March 7, 1981	—N/a
Jesus Culture Concert		April 27, 2013	—N/a
Jethro Tull	Aqualung Tour	October 17, 1971	—N/a
Jethro Tull	Minstrel in the Gallery Tour	August 16, 1975	—N/a
Jethro Tull	Songs from the Wood Tour	October 6, 1982	Saga
The Jimi Hendrix Experience		May 9, 1969	Chicago
Joan Jett and the Blackhearts	Good Music Tour	May 15, 1987	
Joan Sebastian		October 6, 2007	—N/a
John Anderson		April 29, 2005	Fanny Anderson
John Anderson		April 25, 2009	—N/a
John Denver	Back Home Again Tour	April 10, 1975	—N/a
John Denver	Spirit Tour	November 22, 1976	—N/a
John Denver	I Want to Live Tour	March 29, 1978	—N/a
John Denver	Autograph Tour	May 17, 1980	—N/a
John Mellencamp	Scarecrow Tour	March 5, 1986	—N/a
Johnny Cash		September 7, 1963	—N/a
Johnny Cash		October 10, 1964	—N/a
Johnny Cash		September 21, 1968	Carl Perkins
Joni Mitchell	1976 Tour	January 31, 1976	L.A. Express
Journey	Evolution Tour	June 22, 1979	—N/a
Journey	Escape Tour	October 20, 1981	—N/a
Journey	Frontiers Tour	April 26, 1983	Bryan Adams
Journey	Raised on Radio Tour	November 14, 1986	Glass Tiger
Judas Priest	Metal Conqueror Tour	June 27, 1984	Kick Axe
Judas Priest	Fuel for Life Tour	June 14, 1986	Dokken
Judy Garland	That's Entertainment! Tour	April 15, 1961	—N/a
Judy Garland		May 22, 1965	—N/a
Kansas		April 2, 1976	Bad Company
Kansas	Point of Know Return Tour'	November 4, 1977	Crawler
Kansas	Monolith Tour	November 2, 1979	Stiff 'n' the Tears
Kaleidoscope on Ice		November 18, 2011	—N/a
Kaleidoscope on Ice		November 14, 2012	—N/a
Kelly Clarkson	Hazel Eyes Tour	July 24, 2005	Graham Colton Band
Kenny Rogers	Love Will Turn You Around Tour	March 26, 1982	Larry Gatlin & The Gatlin Brothers Band
Kenny Rogers	The Heart of the Matter Tour	March 2, 1985	Dolly Parton & Sawyer Brown
Kid Rock	Rock & Roll Pain Train Tour	February 13, 2004	Gov't Mule
Kings of Leon	Only by the Night World Tour	April 30, 2009	The Walkmen
The Kinks	The Kinks on Tour 1982	January 15, 1982	George Hatcher Band
Kirk Franklin	Hero Tour	March 17, 2006	Mary Mary & Da' T.R.U.T.H.
KISS	Hotter than Hell Tour	November 28, 1974	Black Oak Arkansas
KISS	Alive! Tour	November 29, 1975	Mott & Styx
KISS	Rock & Roll Over Tour	November 25, 1976	—N/a
KISS	Alive II Tour	January 5, 1978	Nantucket
KISS	Dynasty Tour	June 24, 1979	Nantucket
KISS	Animalize World Tour	January 6, 1985	Queensrÿche & Krokus
KISS	Asylum Tour	December 28, 1985	—N/a
KISS	Crazy Nights Tour	February 7, 1988	Ted Nugent
KoЯn	Family Values Tour 1998	November 11, 1998	Rammstein, Limp Bizkit; Incubus & Orgy
KoЯn	Family Values Tour	October 20, 2001	Stone Temple Pilots, Linkin Park, Puddle of Mudd, Staind, Static-X, Deadsy & Spike 1000
KoЯn	See You on the Other Side World Tour	March 22, 2006	Mudvayne & 10 Years
Kyla	15th Anniversary Concert	January 10, 2015	August Alsina & Rich Homie Quan
LMFAO	Sorry for Party Rocking Tour	June 19, 2012	Far East Movement & Sidney Samson
Led Zeppelin	Spring 1970 North American Tour	April 7, 1970	—N/a
Led Zeppelin	1972 North American Tour	June 9, 1972	—N/a
Little Richard		April 2, 1956	Fats Domino
Lee Greenwood		April 28, 2006	—N/a
Luis Miguel	México En La Piel Tour	October 26, 2005	—N/a
Luis Miguel	Cómplices Tour	November 2, 2008	—N/a
Lynyrd Skynyrd	Lynyrd Skynyrd Tribute Tour	October 19, 1987	The Rossington Band
Manic Street Preachers	Everything Must Go Tour	September 11, 1996	—N/a
Marilyn Manson	Guns, God and Government Tour	November 6, 2000	gODHEAD & The Union Underground
Mary J. Blige	The Mary Show Tour	July 27, 2000	Carl Thomas & Jagged Edge
Matchbox 20	Mad Season Tour	April 17, 2001	Everclear & Lifehouse
Matchbox 20	Exile in America Tour	January 29, 2008	Alanis Morissette & Mutemath
Maze		June 1, 2008	—N/a
Maze		October 22, 2010	—N/a
Metallica	Damage, Inc. Tour	May 2, 1986	—N/a
Michael W. Smith	2008 Tour	September 26, 2008	—N/a
Michael W. Smith	2008 Tour	September 27, 2008	—N/a
Mike Stern Group		March 5, 2011	—N/a
Miranda Lambert	On Fire Tour	January 19, 2012	Chris Young & Charlie Worsham
Miranda Lambert	On Fire Tour	January 25, 2012	Chris Young & Charlie Worsham
The Monkees	North American Tour	July 11, 1967	The Jimi Hendrix Experience
The Monkees	20th Anniversary World Tour	November 30, 1986	Herman's Hermits, The Grass Roots & Gary Puckett & The Union Gap
The Moody Blues	Long Distance Voyager Tour	December 1, 1981	Jimmie Spheeris
The Moody Blues	The Other Side of Life Tour	October 2, 1986	The Fixx
Mötley Crüe	Welcome to the Theatre of Pain Tour	December 15, 1985	Autograph
Mötley Crüe	Girls, Girls, Girls Tour	November 11, 1987	Guns N' Roses
Music as a Weapon	Indestructible Tour	April 13, 2009	Killswitch Engage, Lacuna Coil, Spineshank & Suicide Silence
My Chemical Romance	The Black Parade World Tour	April 26, 2007	Muse
Natalie Grant	New Revolve Tour	October 7, 2005	—N/a
Natalie Grant	New Revolve Tour	October 8, 2005	—N/a
Natalie Grant	Relentless Tour	February 1, 2008	—N/a
Natalie Grant	Relentless Tour	February 2, 2008	—N/a
Neil Diamond	Beautiful Noise Tour	May 2, 1977	—N/a
Neil Diamond	North American Tour 78-79	December 14, 1978	—N/a
Neil Diamond	World Tour 1982	March 4, 1982	—N/a
Neil Diamond	Tour 1987	May 12, 1987	—N/a
Neil Young & Crazy Horse	Rust Never Sleeps Tour	October 8, 1978	—N/a
The New Classic Rock All–Stars		October 10, 2004	—N/a
New Edition	30th Anniversary Tour	May 19, 2012	—N/a
O.A.R.	Summer Tour 2008	September 24, 2008	Matt Wertz
The O'Jays		June 19, 1982	Cameo, Atlantic Starr & One Way
The Osmonds		July 24, 1972	—N/a
The Osmonds		August 4, 1975	—N/a
Ozzy Osbourne	Diary of a Madman Tour	May 6, 1982	Magnum
Ozzy Osbourne	Speak of the Devil Tour	February 18, 1983	—N/a
Ozzy Osbourne	The Ultimate Sin Tour	May 2, 1986	Metallica
Pam Tillis		April 26, 2008	Juice Newton
Pam Tillis		April 24, 2010	—N/a
Panic! at the Disco		November 10, 2006	Jack's Mannequin, Bloc Party & Plain White T's
Parliament-Funkadelic	P-Funk Earth Tour	November 20, 1976	—N/a
Parliament-Funkadelic	1979 Tour	January 26, 1979	The Brides of Funkenstein
Poco		November 17, 1974	John Sebastian & Mountain
Poco	Rose of Cimarron Tour	July 18, 1976	The Stills–Young Band
The Police	Ghost in the Machine Tour	April 3, 1982	Joan Jett and the Blackhearts
Poison	Open Up and Say Ahh! Tour	March 21, 1989	Ratt & Tesla
Pretty Lights	Illumination Tour	November 10, 2012	Eliot Lipp
Prince	Controversy Tour	November 27, 1981	The Time & Zapp
Prince	1999 Tour	November 26, 1982	The Time & Vanity 6
Prince	Hit n Run Tour	November 26, 2000	The New Power Generation
Queen	The Game Tour	August 13, 1980	Dakota
Queensrÿche	Building Empires Tour	July 12, 1991	—N/a
Ratt	Dancing Undercover Tour	December 7, 1986	Poison, Cinderella, & Loudness
RBD	Empezar desde Cero Tour 2008	March 7, 2008	La Nueva Banda Timbiriche
R. Kelly	The Get Up on a Room Tour	May 26, 1999	Foxy Brown & Nas
Rainbow	Rainbow on Tour 1978	June 23, 1978	—N/a
Raven-Symoné	Raven-Symoné: Live in Concert Tour	May 3, 2008	B5
REO Speedwagon	Hi Infidelity Tour	July 1, 1981	—N/a
REO Speedwagon	Wheels Are Turnin' Tour	March 3, 1985	Survivor
Rick James	Fire It Up Tour	April 25, 1980	Prince & Kleeer
Rick James		July 16, 1981	Cameo & the Fatback Band
Rick James		July 23, 1982	Dazz Band
Rick Ross, Meek Mill, Waka Flocka Flame	Maybach Music Group Tour	March 2, 2012	Machine Gun Kelly & DJ Scream
Robert Plant	Non Go Stop Tour	July 17, 1988	Cheap Trick
Rod Stewart	Foot Loose & Fancy Free Tour	November 10, 1977	—N/a
Rod Stewart	Camouflage Tour	October 3, 1984	—N/a
Rod Stewart	Out of Order Tour	July 8, 1988	—N/a
The Rolling Stones	1965 North American Tour	November 15, 1965	—N/a
The Rolling Stones	American Tour 1972	July 6, 1972	Stevie Wonder
Ronnie Milsap		November 9, 1985	Exile & The Forester Sisters
Run-DMC	Run's House Tour	June 5, 1988	Public Enemy, D.J. Jazzy Jeff & The Fresh Prince
Rush	Permanent Waves Tour	September 12, 1980	Saxon
Rush	Moving Pictures Tour	December 4, 1981	Riot
Rush	Signals Tour	March 25, 1983	Jon Butcher Axis
Rush	Power Windows Tour	April 20, 1986	Blue Öyster Cult
Rush	Hold Your Fire Tour	November 27, 1987	McAuley Schenker Group
Sammy Hagar	VOA Tour	November 9, 1984	—N/a
Sammy Kershaw		April 28, 2007	—N/a
Santana	Caravanserai Tour	March 7, 1973	—N/a
Santana	Borboletta Tour	June 20, 1975	—N/a
Sarah McLachlan		March 25, 1998	—N/a
Scorpions	Love at First Sting World Tour	July 18, 1984	Bon Jovi
SCREAM	The SCREAM Tour	August 1, 2002	—N/a
SCREAM	The SCREAM Tour	July 24, 2003	—N/a
The Spinners		April 28, 2013	—N/a
Skillet	Comatose Tour	May 4, 2008	Thousand Foot Krutch & Decyfer Down
Skillet & TobyMac	Awake Tonight Tour'	April 18, 2010	RED & The Letter Black
Slipknot	All Hope Is Gone World Tour	February 10, 2009	Coheed and Cambria & Trivium
Sonny & Cher		March 27, 1972	—N/a
Soundgarden	Superunknown Tour'	August 1, 1994	Tad & Eleven
Stevie Nicks	The Wild Heart Tour	November 23, 1983	Joe Walsh
Stone Temple Pilots	Purple Tour	September 1, 1994	Meat Puppets, Redd Kross & Jawbox
Stone Temple Pilots		October 26, 2000	Godsmack & Disturbed
Styx	Pieces of Eight Tour	January 5, 1979	Cindy Bullens
Superchick	Live Love Tour	November 4, 2006	—N/a
Ted Nugent	Ted Nugent Tour 1979	March 3, 1979	—N/a
Ted Nugent	Ted Nugent Tour 1979	August 16, 1979	—N/a
Ted Nugent	Ted Nugent Tour 1980	July 8, 1980	Def Leppard
Tesla	World Tour 1989	February 2, 1989	—N/a
Tesla	World Tour 1989	August 9, 1989	—N/a
Thompson Twins	The Tour of Future Days	December 7, 1985,	Orchestral Manoeuvres in the Dark
T.I.	Farewell Tour	February 26, 2009	Jeezy
Tina Turner	2984 World Tour	November 30, 1984	—N/a
Tina Turner	Private Dancer Tour	November 29, 1985	
Tina Turner	Break Every Rule Tour	October 27, 1987	Level 42
Tom Petty and the Heartbreakers	Long After Dark American Tour	February 6, 1983	Nick Lowe & His Noise To Go
Tool	Tool 2009 Tour	July 29, 2009	Tweak Bird
Tool	Tool Winter Tour	February 4, 2012	Yob
The Rock & Worship Roadshow		November 11, 2011	—N/a
Three Dog Night	July 23, 1972	Buddy Miles & Bang	
Trans-Siberian Orchestra	Christmas Eve and Other Stories	November 20, 2005	—N/a
Trans-Siberian Orchestra	Christmas Eve and Other Stories	November 14, 2006	—N/a
Trans-Siberian Orchestra	Christmas Eve and Other Stories	December 21, 2007	—N/a
Trey Songz	Passion, Pain & Pleasure Tour	April 23, 2010	—N/a
Trey Songz	Passion, Pain & Pleasure Tour	April 25, 2010	—N/a
Trey Songz	The Anticipation 2our	December 14, 2012	Miguel & Elle Varner
Third Day	The Miracle Tour	March 17, 2013	Josh Wilson & Colton Dixon
Uriah Heep	Sweet Freedom Tour	September 16, 1973	Earth, Wind & Fire
Uriah Heep		September 27, 1975	Faces
Usher	Truth Tour	September 30, 2004	Kanye West
Van Halen	Fair Warning Tour	August 24, 1981	—N/a
Van Halen	Hide Your Sheep Tour	July 17, 1982	After the Fire
Van Halen	1984 Tour	February 14, 1984	—N/a
Weezer	Hyper Extended Midget Tour	February 5, 2002	Saves the Day & Ozma
Whitesnake	Whitesnake 1987-88 World Tour	March 1, 1988	Great White
The Who	The Who Tour 1971	November 20, 1971	—N/a
Widespread Panic	Fall Tour 2000	October 21, 2000	Groove Collective
Widespread Panic	Fall Tour 2001	November 16, 2001	Jerry Joseph & The Jackmormons
Widespread Panic	Fall Tour 2001	November 17, 2001	Jerry Joseph & The Jackmormons
Widespread Panic	Fall Tour 2003	October 16, 2003	Leftover Salmon
Winter Jam Tour Spectacular		March 18, 2007	—N/a
Winter Jam Tour Spectacular		February 17, 2011	—N/a
Winter Jam Tour Spectacular		November 7, 2011	—N/a
Wisin & Yandel		August 1, 2010	—N/a
Yes	Close to the Edge Tour	October 3, 1972	The Eagles
Yes	9012Live Tour	September 13, 1984	—N/a
Yes	Big Generation Tour	February 11, 1988	—N/a
Young Buck		October 30, 2004	—N/a
Young Jeezy	Street Dream Tour	March 3, 2007	Lil Wayne, Jim Jones, Baby & Rich Boy
ZZ Top	Expect No Quarter Tour	June 5, 1981	—N/a
ZZ Top	Eliminator Tour	May 20, 1983	Sammy Hagar
ZZ Top	Afterburner World Tour	March 30, 1986	Jimmy Barnes
ZZ Top	Mean Rhythm Global Tour	June 26, 1997	Cheap Trick

Preceded by Time Warner Cable Arena	Home of the Charlotte Checkers (AHL); 2015–present	Succeeded by Current
Preceded by first arena	Home of the Charlotte Checkers (ECHL); 1993–2005	Succeeded by Time Warner Cable Arena
Preceded by Carlin's Iceland, Baltimore	Home of the Charlotte Checkers (EHL/SHL); 1956-1977	Succeeded by Team disbanded
Preceded by TNA Impact! Zone	Host of Genesis; 2008	Succeeded by TNA Impact! Zone
Preceded by Expo Square Pavilion	Ultimate Fighting Championship venue UFC 5	Succeeded by Casper Events Center
