= Arthur G. Odell Jr. =

American architect (1913–1988)

- Born: November 22, 1913; Concord, North Carolina
- Died: April 21, 1988 (aged 74); Charlotte, North Carolina
- Occupation: Architect
- Practice: A. G. Odell Jr. & Associates; Odell Associates

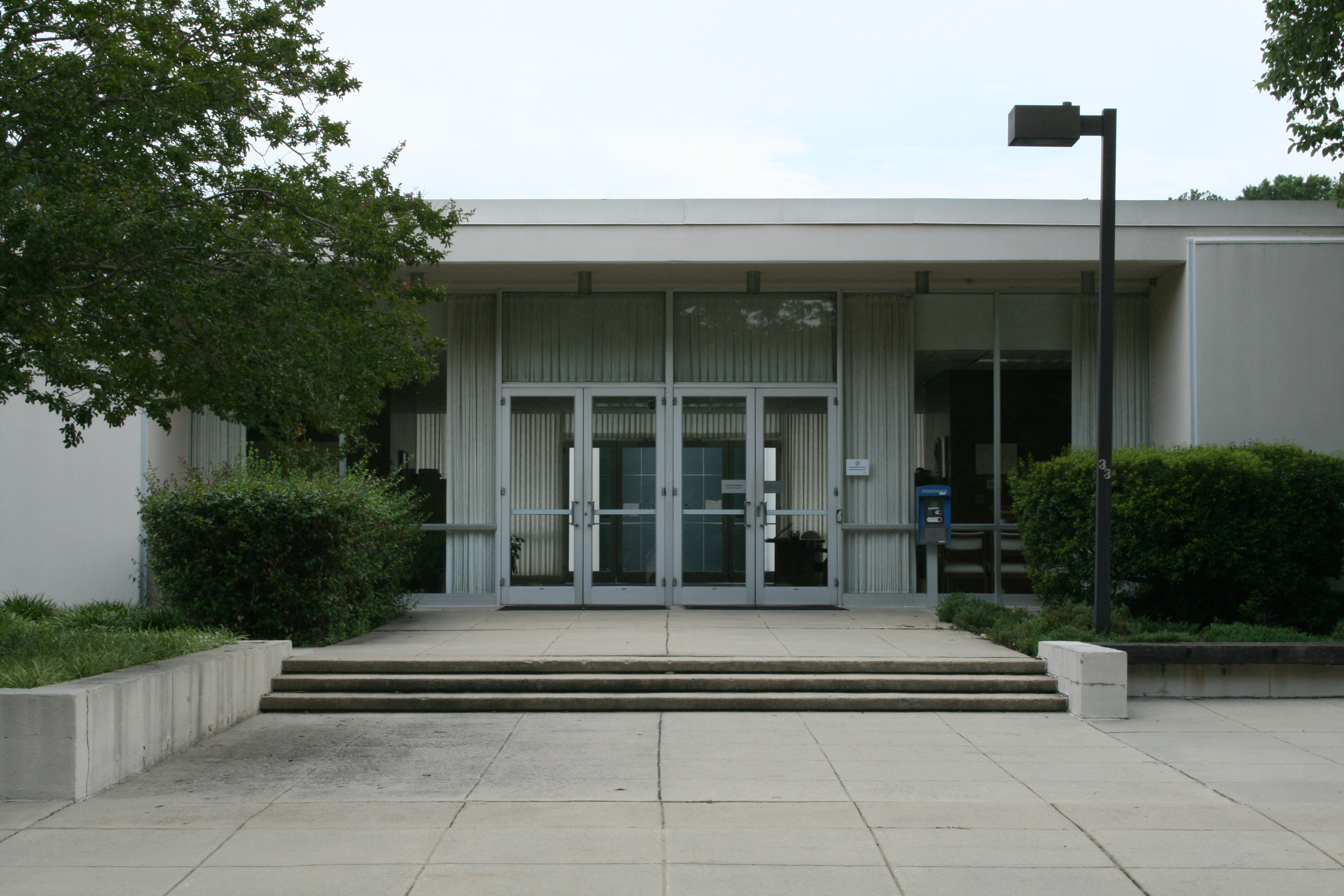
The former Camille Dreyfus Laboratory of the Research Triangle Institute, completed in 1961.

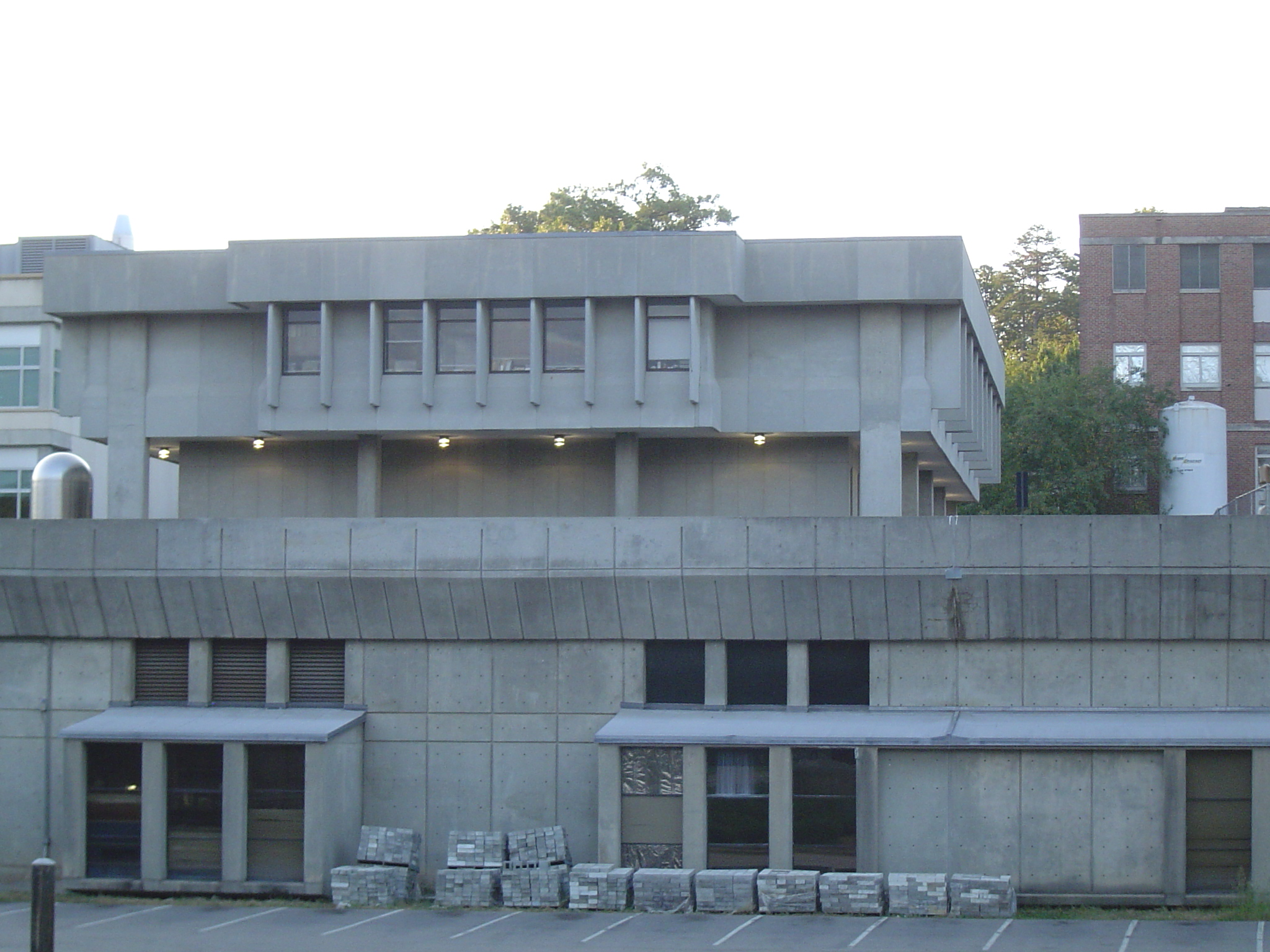
Triangle Universities Nuclear Laboratory, completed in 1965.

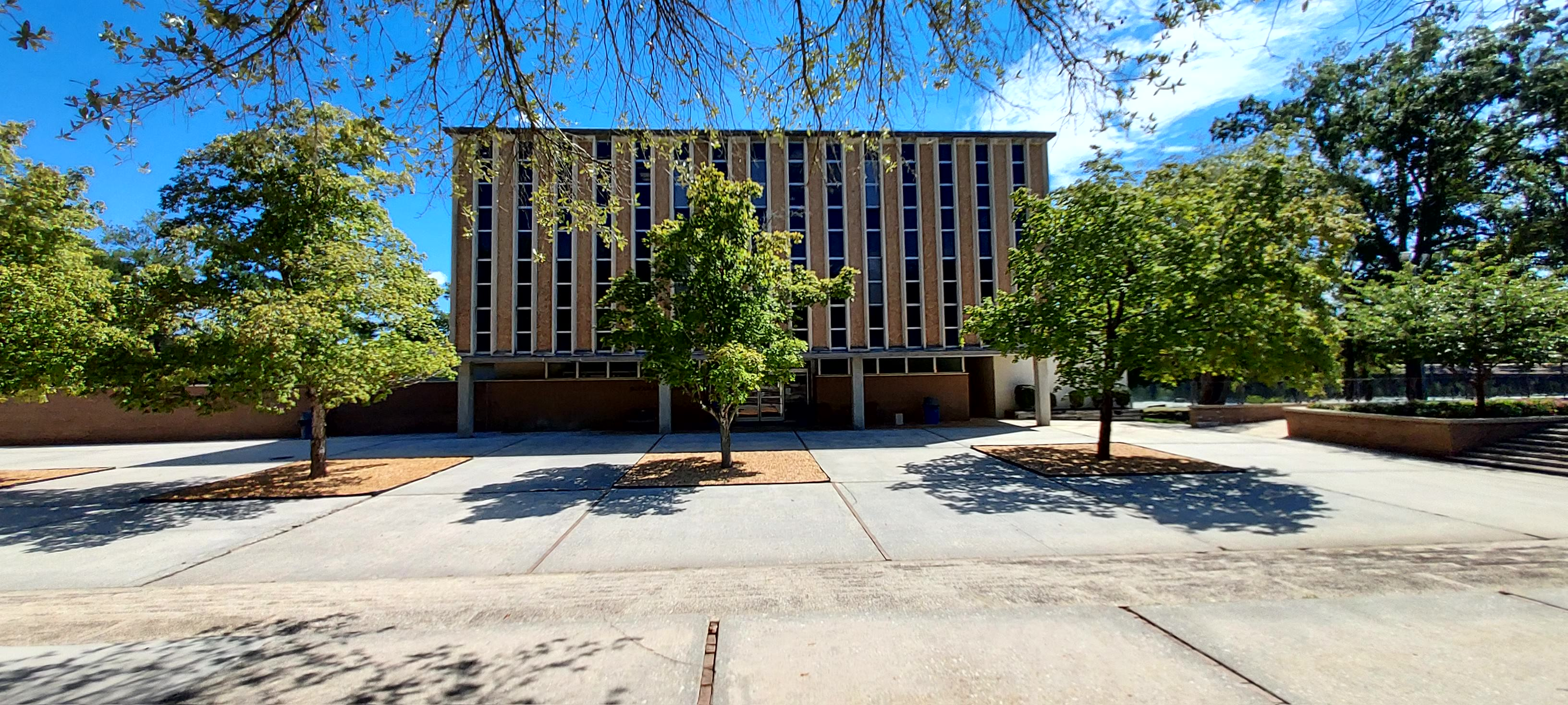
DeTamble Library of St. Andrews University, completed in 1968.

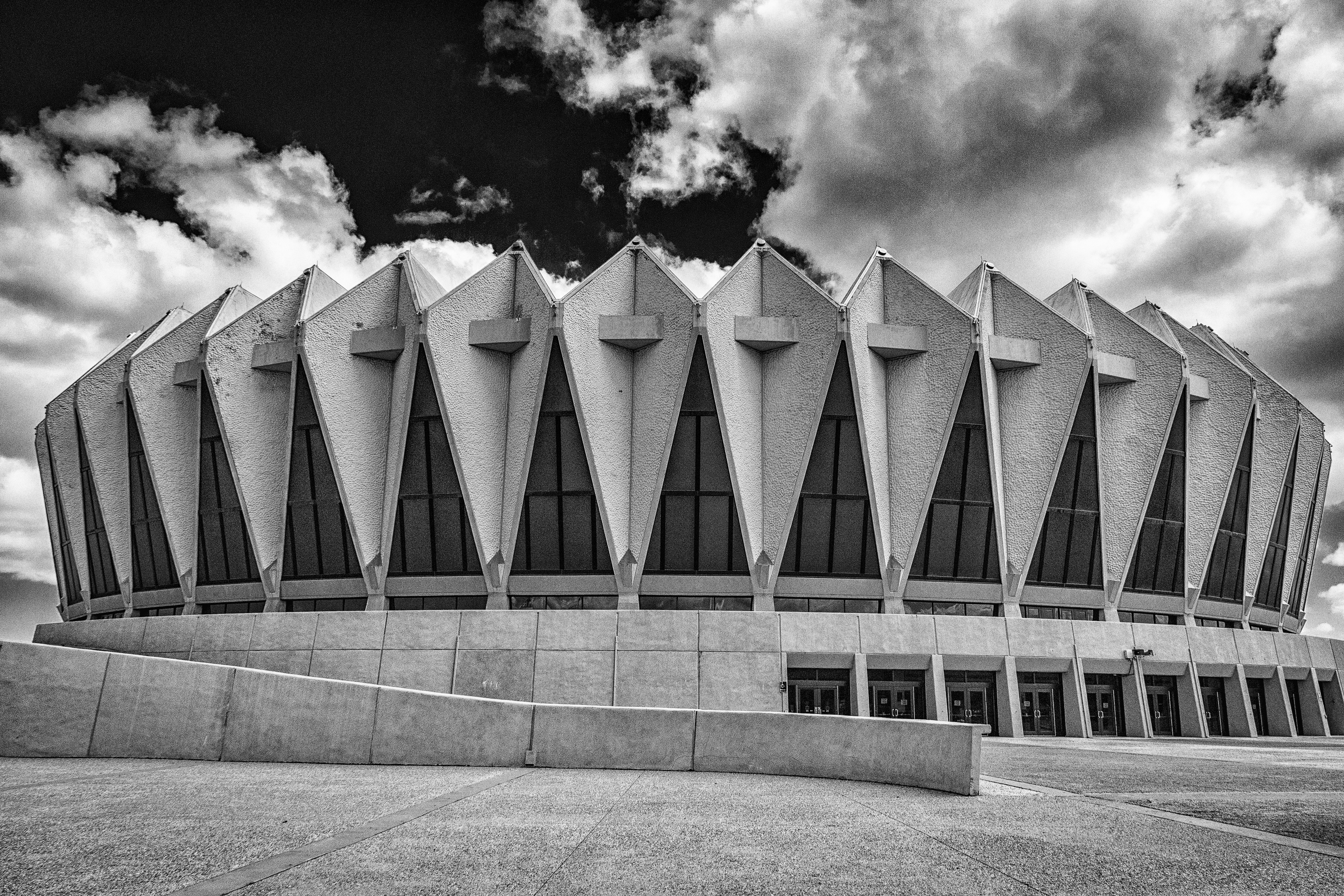
The Hampton Coliseum, completed in 1970.

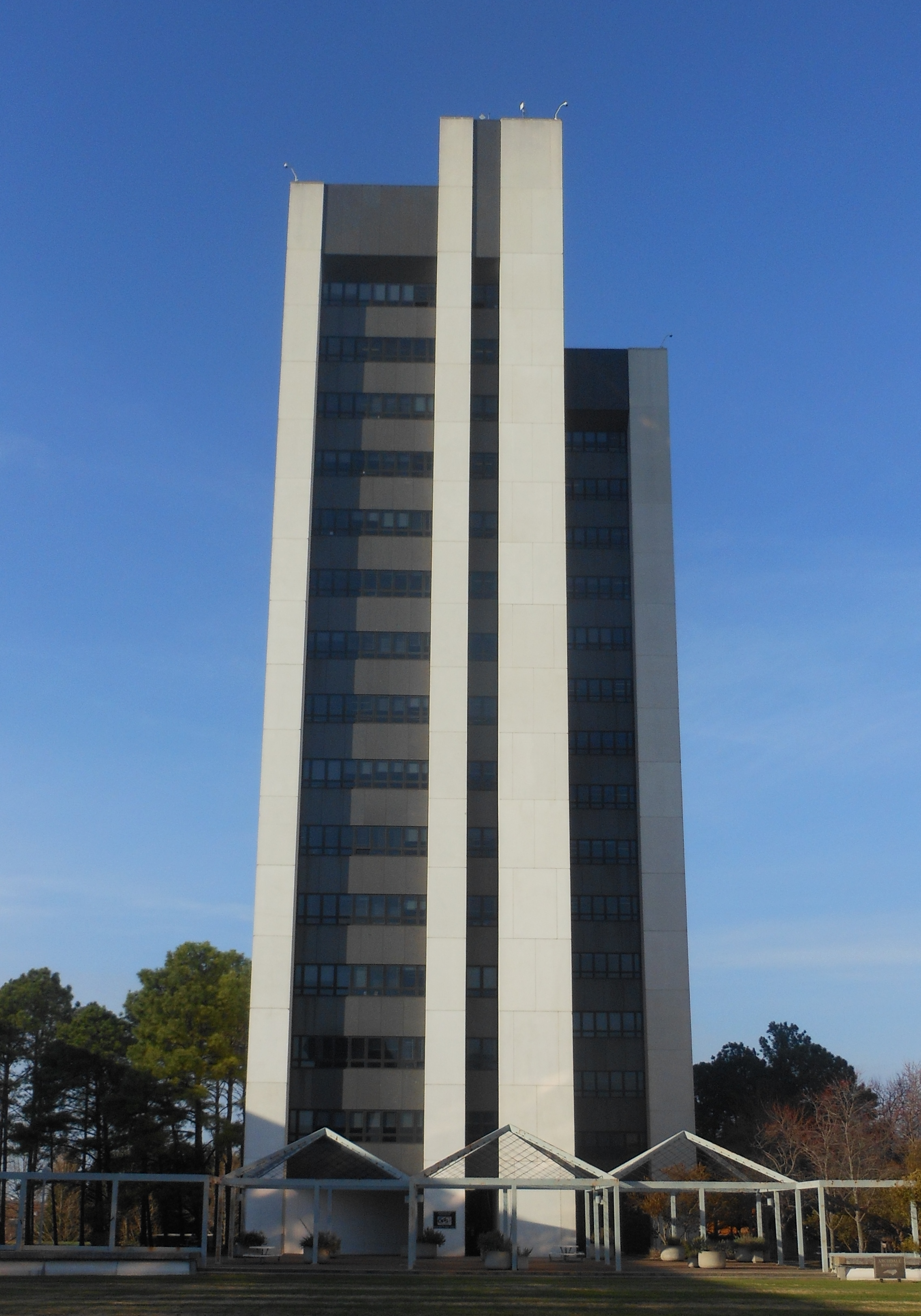
The Archdale Building in Raleigh, completed in 1977.

Arthur G. Odell Jr. FAIA (1913–1988) was an American architect in practice in Charlotte, North Carolina, from 1940 to 1982. He was founder of the practice now known as Odell Associates and was president of the American Institute of Architects for the year 1964–65.

== Life and career ==
Arthur Gould Odell Jr., often known as Gouldie Odell, was born November 22, 1913, in Concord, North Carolina, to Arthur Gould Odell and Grace (Patterson) Odell. He attended Duke University and Cornell University, graduating with a B.Arch. from the latter in 1935. He then spent a year abroad, studying in the atelier of Jacques Debat-Ponsan of the École des Beaux-Arts in Paris. After he returned to the United States he worked for Harrison & Fouilhoux and Raymond Loewy in New York City before returning to North Carolina, opening an office in Charlotte in 1940. His practice was interrupted by World War II, and in 1941 he enlisted in the Corps of Engineers, and attained the rank of lieutenant colonel. In 1945 he reestablished his practice as A. G. Odell Jr. & Associates. Over the next twenty-five years Odell grew the practice to be one of the largest in the region, and in 1970 incorporated it as Odell Associates. Odell continued to expand the firm, opening regional offices in Greensboro, North Carolina, in 1971 and Greenville, South Carolina, and Richmond, Virginia, in 1976. Odell stepped down as president in 1978, and served as chairman of the board until 1982, when he retired from practice. During his career, Odell's office won more than 75 design awards.

Odell was also involved in urban and campus planning, creating master and redevelopment plans for Charlotte and Raleigh as well as plans for St. Andrews University and the University of North Carolina at Charlotte. These were less well received than his architectural work. His Charlotte plan paved the way for the demolition and redevelopment of large portions of the historic city core. In Raleigh, his plan for the Halifax Mall for the state government north of the North Carolina State Capitol caused widespread demolition, and his now-removed Fayetteville Street Mall to the south severely disrupted the city's existing urban pattern. Odell also designed the centerpiece buildings for both projects: The Archdale Building and the Raleigh Civic and Convention Center, which has since been demolished to restore the former street pattern.

Odell joined the American Institute of Architects in 1946 as a member of the North Carolina chapter. He served as chapter president from 1953 to 1955 and as South Atlantic regional director from 1959 to 1962. Following terms as second and first vice president, he was elected president in 1964. He was the first AIA president from a southern state. Odell was elected a Fellow in 1957.

== Personal life ==
Odell was married to Polly Robinson in 1941. Following a divorce, he married Mary Walker in 1951. He had three children. Odell died April 21, 1988, in a Charlotte hospital.

== Legacy ==
A number of architects later prominent in North Carolina and elsewhere worked in Odell's office. These include Harvey Gantt, later Mayor of Charlotte, and Harry Wolf. In 1973 several architects from his firm left to form the large firm of Clark, Tribble, Harris & Li, architects of 100 East Wisconsin in Milwaukee and other skyscrapers.

Some of Odell's papers are in the collection of the J. Murrey Atkins Library of the University of North Carolina at Charlotte.

== Architectural works ==
- Spencer Bell house, 6121 Providence Rd, Charlotte, North Carolina (1952, demolished)
- Double Oaks Elementary School, 1326 Woodward Ave, Charlotte, North Carolina (1955)
- Ovens Auditorium and Bojangles Coliseum, 2700 E Independence Blvd, Charlotte, North Carolina (1955)
- Wachovia Building, (Note: Designed in association with Harrison & Abramovitz of New York City.) 129 W Trade St, Charlotte, North Carolina (1956–58)
- Charlotte Mecklenburg Library, (Note: Planned to be demolished this year (2023).) 310 N Tryon St, Charlotte, North Carolina (1956, altered 1989)
- Concordia Lutheran Church, 216 5th Ave SE, Conover, North Carolina (1957)
- Campus plan and buildings, St. Andrews University, Laurinburg, North Carolina (1959–61 et seq.)
- Campus plan and Kennedy and Macy Buildings, University of North Carolina at Charlotte (1959–61)
- CFG Bank Arena, 201 W Baltimore St, Baltimore (1959–62)
- Charlottetown Mall, Charlotte, North Carolina (1959, demolished 2006)
- Lutheran Church of the Holy Comforter, 216 N Main St, Belmont, North Carolina (1959)
- Wachovia Building, 101 N Front St, Wilmington, North Carolina (1960, demolished 2008)
- Charlotte Memorial Hospital, Charlotte, North Carolina (1961 and 1968)
- Camille Dreyfus Laboratory, Research Triangle Institute, Research Triangle Park, North Carolina (1961, demolished 2011)
- Triangle Universities Nuclear Laboratory, Duke University, Durham, North Carolina (1965)
- Wachovia Building, 201 N Elm St, Greensboro, North Carolina (1966–68)
- Hampton Coliseum, 1000 Coliseum Dr, Hampton, Virginia (1968–70)
- D. H. Hill Jr. Library north tower, North Carolina State University, Raleigh, North Carolina (1968–71)
- Burlington Industries headquarters, 3330 W Friendly Ave, Greensboro, North Carolina (1970–71, demolished 2005)
- One South at The Plaza, (Note: Designed in association with Thompson, Ventulett & Stainback of Atlanta.) 101 S Tryon St, Charlotte, North Carolina (1972–74)
- Blue Cross and Blue Shield headquarters, 1830 Fordham Blvd, Chapel Hill, North Carolina (1973)
- Raleigh Civic and Convention Center, 500 S Salisbury St, Raleigh, North Carolina (1975–77, demolished 2006)
- Virginia Beach Pavilion Convention Center, (Note: Designed in association with Walsh & Ashe of Virginia Beach.) 1000 19th St, Virginia Beach, Virginia (1975–81, demolished 2005)
- Archdale Building, 512 N Salisbury St, Raleigh, North Carolina (1977)
- R. J. Reynolds Tobacco Company headquarters (former), 1100 Reynolds Blvd, Winston-Salem, North Carolina (1978)

== See also ==
- Arthur Gould Odell papers, J. Murrey Atkins Library, University of North Carolina at Charlotte
