= Hotter than Hell Tour =

1974–1975 concert tour by Kiss

- Promotional tour by Kiss
- Poster to the concert in Peru, USA
- Associated album: Hotter than Hell
- Start date: October 17, 1974
- End date: February 22, 1975
- No. of shows: 51

Kiss concert chronology
- Kiss Tour (1974); Hotter than Hell Tour (1974–1975); Dressed to Kill Tour (1975)

The Hotter than Hell Tour was the second tour of the American rock band Kiss. The tour featured songs from their first album and their newly released second album, Hotter than Hell, which was the album that the tour was in support of. During this tour, the band used fire and the destruction of guitars as part of their show. The January 31, 1975, show in San Francisco was filmed and later made available for public viewing.

In the tour program for the band's final tour, Stanley reflected on the tour:

Touring in the early days was both grueling and great. I think we were getting paid sixty dollars a week but we felt we were living the dream. We were a rock band in a rented station wagon but it was really exciting. We felt we were on a mission and were on the road to glory. We were a gang of people on a crusade who believed in something and were willing to do anything to promote it. There was a tremendous camaraderie in the band in spite of our differences and the people around us shared that passion.

== Reception ==
Two local reporters from MSU State News and State Journal who attended the October 21 and 22, 1974, performances had given the sold out performances positive reviews, noting that their overall show was good, the music tight, and their musicianship excellent. Although mixed on the costume designs, the reviewers cited the high energy from the audience attending the performances and the band's rising popularity in Detroit.

Following the London, Ontario, Canada, performance, a reporter from London Free Press had given the performance a mixed review, stating: "Kiss is a tight well rehearsed band with some excellent musical ideas. Unfortunately, the ability to hear any of this is lost in the incredible amount of distortion which is created by Kiss' pain-inducing volume level. Kiss has something to offer musically but the glitter and whiteface is on its way out and if the group is to remain alive, it must change and face the future that one of its members is supposed to represent."

== Tour dates ==
Date	City	Country	Venue	Support Act(s)
October 17, 1974	Comstock Park	United States	Thunder Chicken	—N/a
October 18, 1974	Hammond	United States	Parthenon Theater	—N/a
October 19, 1974	Toledo	United States	Valentine Theatre	The Rockets
October 21, 1974	Lansing	United States	Brewery	—N/a
October 22, 1974	Lansing	United States	Brewery	—N/a
October 25, 1974	Passaic	United States	Capitol Theatre	Golden Earring; John Hammond
October 27, 1974	Youngstown	United States	Tomorrow Club	Cannonball
October 30, 1974	Columbus	United States	Agora Ballroom	If (band)
October 31, 1974	Peru	United States	Peru Circus Arena	Stonewall
November 2, 1974	Des Plaines	United States	Maine West High School	Smokehouse
November 3, 1974	Duluth	United States	Duluth Arena	Dr. John; Easy Steam
November 7, 1974	St. Louis	United States	Kiel Auditorium	Heartsfield; T-Rex; Neil Merryweather and the Space Rangers
November 8, 1974	Chicago	United States	Aragon Ballroom	UFO; T-Rex
November 10, 1974	University Center	United States	Pioneer Gymnasium	Skyhooks
November 12, 1974	Minot	United States	Minot Municipal Auditorium	Clowns
November 16, 1974	Asbury Park	United States	Sunshine Inn	Mercury; Fantasy
November 21, 1974	Cedar Rapids	United States	Cedar Rapids Memorial Coliseum	Foghat
November 23, 1974	Atlanta	United States	Alexander Memorial Coliseum	Black Oak Arkansas; James Montgomery
November 27, 1974	Greenville	United States	Greenville Memorial Auditorium	Black Oak Arkansas; James Montgomery
November 28, 1974	Charlotte	United States	Charlotte Coliseum	Black Oak Arkansas; James Montgomery
November 29, 1974	Charleston	United States	Gaillard Municipal Auditorium	Black Oak Arkansas; James Montgomery
November 30, 1974	Fayetteville	United States	Cumberland County Memorial Arena	Black Oak Arkansas; James Montgomery
December 6, 1974	Bowling Green	United States	Van Meter Auditorium	—N/a
December 8, 1974	Evansville	United States	Roberts Municipal Stadium	ZZ Top; Point Blank
December 10, 1974	Davenport	United States	Palmer Auditorium	ZZ Top; Point Blank
December 12, 1974	Flint	United States	IMA Auditorium	ZZ Top
December 13, 1974	La Crosse	United States	Mary E. Sawyer Auditorium	Eddie Boy
December 18, 1974	La Porte	United States	La Porte Armory	The Scream
December 20, 1974	Detroit	United States	Michigan Palace	Rush; Fancy
December 21, 1974	Detroit	United States	Michigan Palace	Rush; Fancy
December 22, 1974	London	Canada	London Gardens	Joe; DJ Ronny Legge
December 23, 1974	Wilkes-Barre	United States	Paramount Theater	Kenny Kramer
December 27, 1974	Fort Wayne	United States	Allen County War Memorial Coliseum	REO Speedwagon; Quicksilver Messenger Service
December 28, 1974	Indianapolis	United States	Indiana Convention Center	REO Speedwagon; Quicksilver Messenger Service; Hydra
December 29, 1974	South Bend	United States	Morris Civic Auditorium	Quicksilver Messenger Service; Hydra
December 30, 1974	Springfield	United States	Illinois State Armory	Mike Quatro Jam Band
December 31, 1974	Evansville	United States	Evansville Coliseum	Raspberries
January 7, 1975	Lethbridge	Canada	Lethbridge Pavilion	—N/a
January 9, 1975	Vancouver	Canada	Commodore Ballroom	Sam Hurrie
January 10, 1975	Portland	United States	Paramount Theater	Ballin' Jack
January 11, 1975	Medford	United States	Medford Armory	Arosa
January 12, 1975	Seattle	United States	Paramount Theatre	Ballin' Jack
January 17, 1975	Long Beach	United States	Long Beach Arena	Wishbone Ash; Camel
January 18, 1975	San Bernardino	United States	Swing Auditorium	ZZ Top
January 19, 1975	San Diego	United States	San Diego Civic Theater	Wishbone Ash; Camel
January 26, 1975	Fresno	United States	Selland Arena	ZZ Top; Wishbone Ash
January 31, 1975	San Francisco	United States	Winterland Ballroom	Eli; The Third Rail
February 1, 1975	Santa Monica	United States	Santa Monica Civic Auditorium	Jo Jo Gunne; Yesterday & Today
February 20, 1975	St. Louis	United States	Kiel Auditorium	Steve Harley & Cockney Rebel; The Road Crew
February 21, 1975	Chicago	United States	Aragon Ballroom	James Gang; Man
February 22, 1975	Schererville	United States	Omni 41	James Gang; Pezband

== Personnel ==
- Paul Stanley – vocals, rhythm guitar
- Gene Simmons – vocals, bass
- Peter Criss – drums, vocals
- Ace Frehley – lead guitar, backing vocals
