= Chick Evans Field House =

Arena in DeKalb, Illinois, US

Coordinates: 41.935539°N 88.77231°W

The Chick Evans Field House is a 6,000-seat multi-purpose arena in DeKalb, Illinois, United States. The arena opened in 1956 and was home to the Northern Illinois University Huskies basketball team prior to the 2002 opening of the Convocation Center. It now serves as the indoor venue for the Huskies' men's and women's tennis teams. It was named in honor of longtime NIU athletic director George "Chick" Evans.

In addition to varsity tennis, the building is now used for recreation, housing basketball, indoor soccer, and floor hockey. It is also the base of operations for the university's ROTC program. In addition some smaller-scale events, such as organizational expos by the Student Association, are still held here.

Over the years, the Field House was also used as a concert venue. Elton John played there in 1972, The Beach Boys in 1972, Santana played there on February 10, 1973, Fleetwood Mac played there in 1974, KISS played there in 1974 (Kiss Tour '74). Frank Zappa played there in 1976. UK band Jethro Tull played there in 1975. Muddy Waters from Chicago played there in 1976. Charlie Daniels Band in 1976, Rockford's Rock and Roll Hall of Fame inductee Cheap Trick played there twice (once in 1977), Grateful Dead in 1977, Blue Öyster Cult in 1978, Hall & Oates in 1978, Jefferson Starship (with Highland Park's Grace Slick) in 1979, Loverboy (from Canada) in 1981 with Kansas, UK's Peter Gabriel in 1982, The Kinks in 1983, R.E.M. in 1986, UB40 in 1988, Bob Dylan (from Duluth) in 1990, UK's Dire Straits in 1992, Black Crowes in 1993, Chicago's Veruca Salt in 1993, Rage Against the Machine (with Chicago's Tom Morello) in 1993 with Cypress Hill, Gin Blossoms in 1994, Blues Traveler with The Wallflowers in 1996, Counting Crows in 1997, Less Than Jake in 2000, and bluesman B.B. King in 2005.
