= Dressed to Kill Tour (Kiss) =

1975 concert tour by Kiss

Dressed To Kill Tour
- Tour by Kiss
- Poster to the concert in Cleveland
- Associated album: Dressed to Kill
- Start date: March 19, 1975
- End date: August 28, 1975
- No. of shows: 65

Kiss concert chronology
- Hotter than Hell Tour (1974–1975); Dressed to Kill Tour (1975); Alive! Tour (1975–1976)

The Dressed to Kill Tour was the fourth tour of American hard rock band Kiss. The tour was in support of the album Dressed to Kill, and took place in 1975 throughout the United States.

In the tour program for the band's final tour, Paul Stanley said:

Headlining at Cobo Hall in Detroit for the first time was a real eye opener. It was happening for us at that time. The roller coaster had gone over the top and we were on the ride. I could sense that we were really on our way. I don't think I ever doubted that I was going to succeed. Maybe the best way to succeed is to never doubt it. You may fail but I think the most important thing is having that determination and belief in yourself.

== Background ==
When Kiss was the opening act for Black Sabbath at their performances, Ozzy Osbourne recalled: "When the Kiss army was happening, they blew us to smithereens. Pyro? Jeezus Christ, they were unreal. It was frightening going on after them."

== Reception ==
A reviewer for the Oregonian who attended the May 24 performance in Portland gave the show a positive review, stating: "Kiss is certainly a Portland band. Not born in the city, but its appearances have been met with rollicking capacity houses at the Paramount Northwest theater. Well, Saturday night was no exception... There's something going on every minute onstage; not so much the dramatic outpourings of, say, an Alice Cooper, but in the continual interplay between the four members of the group as they utilize the entire stage for their monster-movie shenanigans. And it's all in fun; there's really very little to take seriously in this act. The theater rock effects are handled in a disciplined - if loose - manner while thunderous music practically blows your head away with decibels... Hair flies and bodies shake, and Kiss works to exhaustion. Musically, it's all rock and roll - and loud. Super loud. Extremely loud..."

A Charleston Gazette reporter who had attended the June 22 performance in Charleston had given a mixed review however, and said: "Next to Kiss, Alice Cooper and the New York Dolls make sense. This group of four men, thinks the concert is a costume party and they come dressed to kill. Kiss is weird, but its music is solid rock 'n' roll... It's hard to know exactly what to make of Kiss, this group with the Halloween makeup and exaggerated motions. They sometimes act as if they're not quite sure what their instruments are for, but when they play them, it's obvious they do... They call Kiss the hottest band in America. I'm not sure about that, but they certainly are the weirdest.

== Tour dates ==
Date	City	Country	Venue	Support Act(s)
March 19, 1975	Northampton	United States	Roxy Theater	Passport
March 21, 1975	New York City	United States	Beacon Theatre	Jo Jo Gunne
March 27, 1975	Kenosha	United States	Kenosha Ice Arena	Rush
March 28, 1975	Toledo	United States	Toledo Sports Arena	ZZ Top
April 4, 1975	Hartland	United States	Nordic Ice Arena	Mike Quatro Jam Band; Smack Dab
April 6, 1975	Washington, D.C.	United States	Lisner Auditorium	Rush; Heavy Metal Kids
April 8, 1975	Akron	United States	Akron Civic Theatre	Rush; Heavy Metal Kids
April 9, 1975	Erie	United States	Erie County Field House	Rush; Vitale's Madmen
April 11, 1975	Dayton	United States	Palace Theater	Heavy Metal Kids
April 12, 1975	Normal	United States	ISU Union Auditorium	Rush
April 13, 1975	Kansas City	United States	Memorial Hall	Golden Earring; Vitale's Madmen
April 15, 1975	Pittsburgh	United States	Stanley Theatre	Rush; Heavy Metal Kids
April 17, 1975	Burlington	United States	Burlington Memorial Auditorium	Rush; Heavy Metal Kids
April 19, 1975	Palatine	United States	William Fremd High School	Rush
April 21, 1975	Louisville	United States	Memorial Auditorium	Rush
April 22, 1975	Indianapolis	United States	Indiana Convention Center	Rush; Status Quo
April 24, 1975	Johnson City	United States	Freedom Hall Civic Center	Rush; Heavy Metal Kids
April 25, 1975	Charlotte	United States	Charlotte Park Center	Rush
April 26, 1975	Fayetteville	United States	Cumberland County Memorial Arena	Rush; Atlanta Rhythm Section
April 27, 1975	Richmond	United States	Richmond Arena	Rush; Oblivion Express; M-S Funk
April 29, 1975	Lansing	United States	Lansing Metro Theater	Salem Witchcraft
April 30, 1975	Columbus	United States	Columbus Veterans Memorial Auditorium	Status Quo
May 3, 1975	Upper Darby	United States	Tower Theater Township	Amboy Dukes; Rush
May 6, 1975	Milwaukee	United States	Riverside Theater	Rush
May 8, 1975	Romeoville	United States	Lewis University	Rush
May 9, 1975	Ada	United States	King Horn Center Gym	James Gang; The Flock
May 10, 1975	Landover	United States	Capital Centre	ZZ Top
May 11, 1975	Boston	United States	Orpheum Theatre	Hunter-Ronson; Journey
May 16, 1975	Detroit	United States	Cobo Arena	Diamond Reo
May 17, 1975	Johnstown	United States	Cambria County War Memorial Arena	Rush
May 19, 1975	St. Paul	United States	Civic Center Theater	Hydra
May 23, 1975	Medford	United States	Medford Armory	Rush
May 24, 1975	Portland	United States	Paramount Theatre	Rush
May 25, 1975	Seattle	United States	Paramount Theatre	Rush
May 26, 1975	Portland	United States	Paramount Theatre	Rush
May 27, 1975	Spokane	United States	Spokane Coliseum	Rush
May 29, 1975	Las Vegas	United States	Sahara Space Center	Rush
May 31, 1975	Long Beach	United States	Long Beach Arena	James Gang
June 1, 1975	San Francisco	United States	Winterland Ballroom	Rush; The Tubes
June 6, 1975	Fresno	United States	Warnors Theatre	Rush
June 7, 1975	San Diego	United States	San Diego Civic Theater	Rush
June 13, 1975	Tulsa	United States	Tulsa Fairgrounds Pavilion	Rare Earth; Point Blank
June 14, 1975	Austin	United States	Austin Coliseum	Rare Earth
June 15, 1975	Corpus Christi	United States	Memorial Coliseum	Rare Earth
June 18, 1975	Jackson	United States	Jackson Sports Arena	Salem Witchcraft
June 20, 1975	Salem	United States	Salem Civic Center	Montrose
June 21, 1975	Cleveland	United States	Cleveland Music Hall	Journey
June 22, 1975	Charleston	United States	Charleston Civic Center	Montrose; Journey
June 25, 1975	Asbury Park	United States	Asbury Park Convention Hall	Skyscraper
June 27, 1975	Asheville	United States	Asheville Civic Center	Montrose
June 28, 1975	Greenville	United States	Greenville Memorial Auditorium	Montrose
July 1, 1975	Port Chester	United States	Capitol Theatre	—N/a
July 5, 1975	Tampa	United States	Tampa State Fairgrounds (Florida Jam)	—N/a
July 20, 1975	Davenport	United States	RKO Orpheum Theater	Journey
July 23, 1975	Wildwood	United States	Wildwoods Convention Center	Mushroom
August 2, 1975	Baltimore	United States	Baltimore Civic Center	Black Sabbath
August 3, 1975	Providence	United States	Providence Civic Center	Black Sabbath
August 14, 1975	Boston	United States	Orpheum Theater	Black Sabbath
August 15, 1975	Saginaw	United States	Wendler Arena	The Flock
August 16, 1975	Muskegon	United States	L. C. Walker Arena	The Flock
August 17, 1975	Pekin	United States	Pekin Memorial Stadium	REO Speedwagon; Ted Nugent; Smokehouse
August 23, 1975	Hempstead	United States	Calderone Concert Hall	The Flock
August 25, 1975	Harrisburg	United States	State Farm Arena	REO Speedwagon
August 27, 1975	Owensboro	United States	Owensboro Sportscenter	Hydra
August 28, 1975	Indianapolis	United States	Indiana Convention Center	Uriah Heep; Alanta Rhythm Section

== Personnel ==
- Paul Stanley – vocals, rhythm guitar
- Gene Simmons – vocals, bass
- Peter Criss – drums, vocals
- Ace Frehley – lead guitar, backing vocals
