= Odell Associates =

Odell Associates is an American architectural practice formed by Arthur G. Odell Jr. in 1940. Originally based in Charlotte, North Carolina, it now has offices in Virginia, Texas and China.

== History ==
Arthur Gould Odell was born November 22, 1913, in Concord, North Carolina, and studied for a year at Duke University in 1930 before transferring to Cornell University, where he graduated in 1935 with a degree in architecture. He continued his studies at the Ecole des Beaux Arts in Paris. Odell became president of American Institute of Architects in 1964-1965). He died April 21, 1988, in Charlotte.

The current CEO is Brad Bartholomew, who joined the board in 2014.

== Notable projects ==
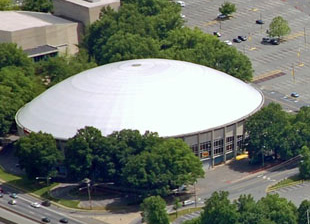
Bojangles Coliseum

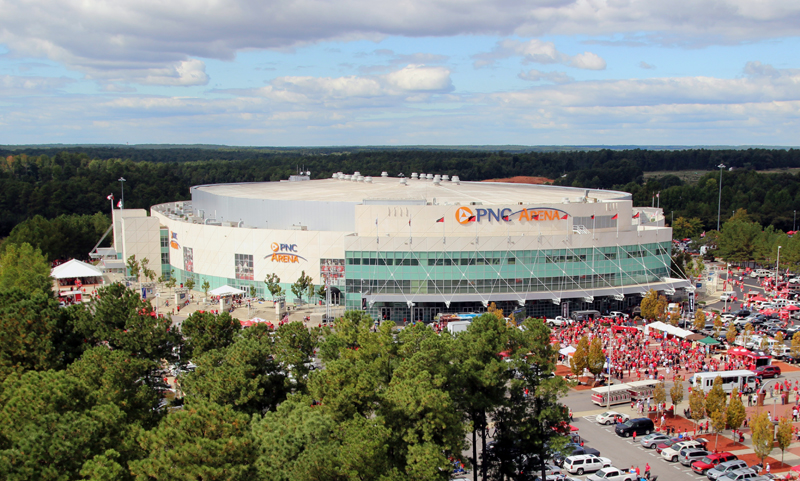
Lenovo Center, Raleigh

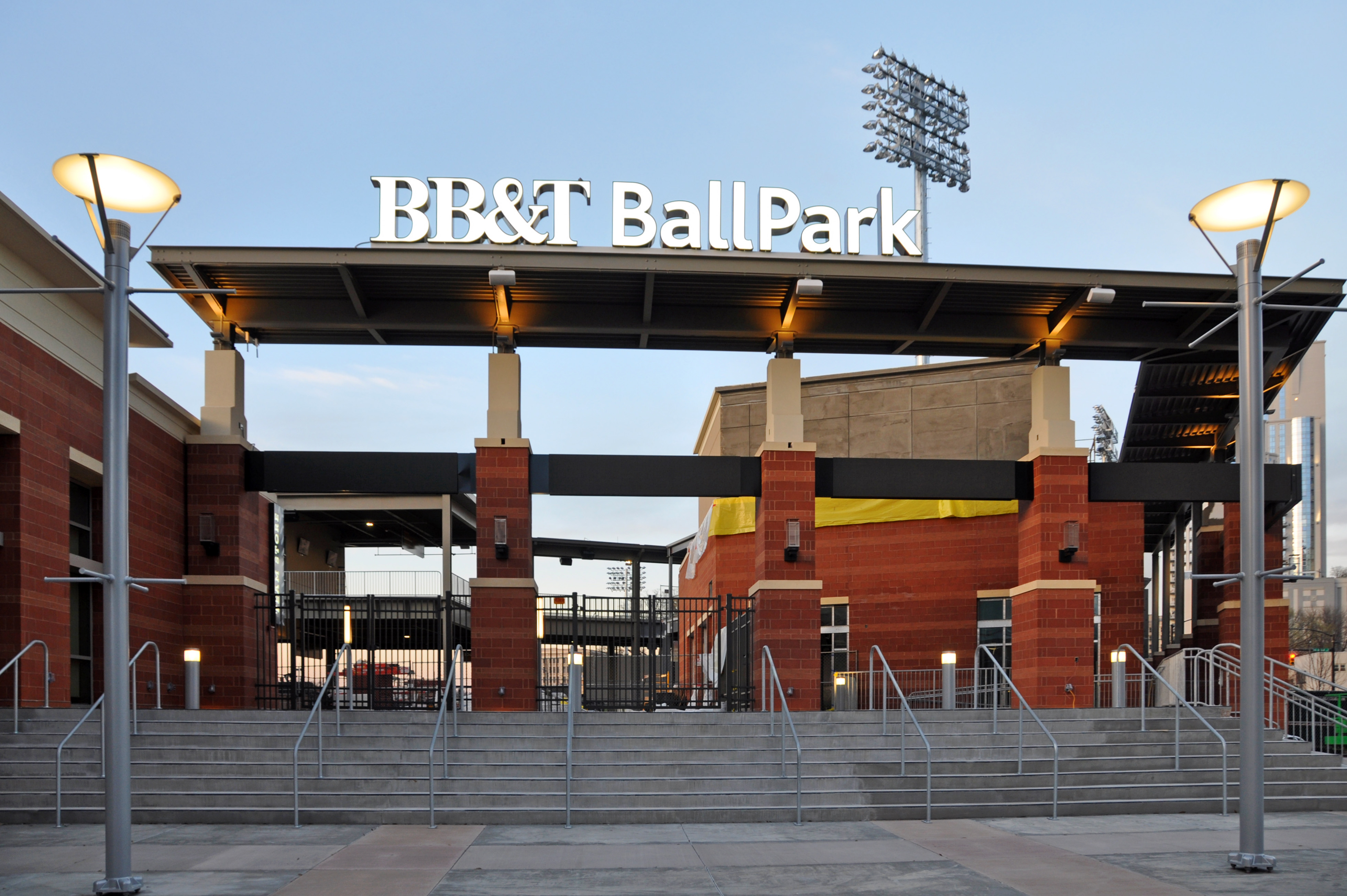
Truist Field, Charlotte

- Bojangles Coliseum, formally Charlotte Coliseum and Independence Arena, North Carolina 1955
- Hampton Coliseum, Virginia 1970
- Charlotte Douglas International Airport Passenger Terminal, North Carolina 1982
- Charlotte Coliseum 1988 (demolished 2007)
- Knights Stadium, Fort Mill, South Carolina 1990 (demolished 2015)
- Nomaco Park, Zebulon, North Carolina 1991
- Florence Center, 1993
- North Charleston Coliseum, South Carolina 1993
- Columbus Civic Center, Georgia 1996
- Shriners Hospital for Children, Houston 1996
- Cumberland County Crown Coliseum, Fayetteville, North Carolina 1997
- Lenovo Center (formally Raleigh Entertainment & Sports Arena), North Carolina 1999
- Philadelphia International Airport Terminal F 2001
- Resch Center, Ashwaubenon, Wisconsin 2002
- William M. Thomas Terminal, Meadows Field Airport, Kern County, California 2006
- BOK Center, Tulsa, Oklahoma 2008 (with Pelli Clarke Pelli and MATRIX Architects)
- Truist Field, Charlotte, North Carolina 2014
- SRP Park North Augusta, South Carolina 2018
