= The Early Days of Kiss =

1973–1974 concert tour by Kiss

Club Tour
- Tour by Kiss
- Poster to the concert in New York
- Location: United States
- Start date: January 30, 1973
- End date: January 26, 1974
- No. of shows: 27

Kiss concert chronology
- Club Tour (1973–1974); Kiss Tour (1974)

The American rock band, Kiss performed various concerts in small clubs throughout 1973 and 1974, which was later dubbed officially as their Club Tour. During this time, Kiss hired Bill Aucoin as their manager, and were then signed to Casablanca Records.

== History ==
The first Kiss performance took place on January 30, 1973, for an audience of fewer than ten people at the Popcorn Pub (renamed Coventry shortly afterward) in Queens. The band were paid $50 for performing two sets that evening, following a cold-call Simmons had made to the venue, convincing them to hire the new band for a three-night stand.

Our first show ever was at Coventry. Coventry was a study in contrasts. The first time we played there was nobody there. The last time we played there, you could barely get in the door.
—Paul Stanley

When the band performed at the Daisy in Amityville, Simmons recalled that it was "a drinking club, with cheap beer and a biker crowd", while Stanley remembered the Daisy being "no better than the size of a living room".

To give their performances a presence, the band would use fake Marshall amplifiers on stage with hollow cabinets to make the music seem louder than it was.

From October to November, the band recorded their self-titled debut album, which was released on February 18, 1974. The December 22 show at Coventry in Queens is the earliest filmed live performance by Kiss as described in Kissology Volume 1 and Volume 3. During the New Year's Eve show at The Academy of Music in New York City as an opening act for Blue Öyster Cult, Simmons accidentally set his hair ablaze while performing his fire-breathing routine.

For the last three shows of the tour, Stanley changed his makeup to "The Bandit" because Neil Bogart thought the Starchild character was "kind of swishy... kind of feminine" and that Stanley should be "more macho" onstage. As Stanley stated "I just came up with this Lone Ranger bandit, as it became known, and it lasted maybe a month. But I just went, 'You know what? My gig, my face, my makeup.' And I just went back to the Starchild. A lot of people believe that [the Bandit] came first, but it actually didn't."

== Reception ==
Fred Kirby of Variety who had attended the June and August performances, had given the band a positive review, citing that the band "outshine most of the others in clean, pulsating rock and roll, high in volume and excitement". He pointed out the unrelenting and solid set, as well as praising Gene as a 'theatrical plus'. Kirby concluded his review with stating that the music catches hold and never lets go. He would note that Kiss had drawn good crowds and were building a local following.

Stanley Mises, a local New York Sunday News reviewer who attended the Coventry performances, cited that the show was more complex and the music was "loud, loud, loud" but fairly simple. He would state that the members looked like "Lance Loud on a nightmarish blender".

Chris Charlesworth of Melody Maker, who attended the December 31, 1973 performance, praised the band's performance, music and costumes. He pointed out the music, saying it was "loud and heavy, simple riff-based rock and roll with a steady funky beat". Concluding his review, he noted the climax as "brash and spectacular" as well as pointing out the fire breathing incident during 'Firehouse'.

A reviewer from Billboard who attended the January 26, 1974 performance at the Academy of Music, noted on the band's embrace to touring after having performed at various local clubs for a year. The show was given a positive review with their set cited as being ear shattering, as well as the heavy reliance on special effects.

== Tour dates ==
List of 1973 concerts
Date	City	Country	Venue	Support Act(s)
January 30, 1973	New York City	United States	Coventry	—N/a
January 31, 1973	New York City	United States	Coventry	—N/a
February 1, 1973	New York City	United States	Coventry	—N/a
March 9, 1973	Amityville	United States	The Daisy	—N/a
March 10, 1973	Amityville	United States	The Daisy	—N/a
April 13, 1973	Amityville	United States	The Daisy	—N/a
April 14, 1973	Amityville	United States	The Daisy	—N/a
May 4, 1973	New York City	United States	Bleecker Street Loft	Queen Elizabeth†; The Brats‡
May 26, 1973	Palisades	United States	Lamont Hall	Bloontz‡ Rebillot Quintet‡
June 1, 1973	New York City	United States	Bleecker Street Loft	The Brats†
June 8, 1973	Amityville	United States	The Daisy	—N/a
June 9, 1973	Amityville	United States	The Daisy	—N/a
June 15, 1973	Amityville	United States	The Daisy	—N/a
June 16, 1973	Amityville	United States	The Daisy	—N/a
July 13, 1973	New York City	United States	Crystal Ballroom	The Brats†; Planets‡
August 10, 1973	New York City	United States	Crystal Ballroom	Street Punk‡ Luger‡
August 17, 1973	Amityville	United States	The Daisy	—N/a
August 18, 1973	Amityville	United States	The Daisy	—N/a
August 24, 1973	Amityville	United States	The Daisy	—N/a
August 25, 1973	Amityville	United States	The Daisy	—N/a
August 31, 1973	New York City	United States	Coventry	Wild Honey‡ The Dogs‡
September 1, 1973	New York City	United States	Coventry	Wild Honey‡ The Dogs‡
~~September 2, 1973~~	New York City	United States	Coventry	—N/a
December 21, 1973	New York City	United States	Coventry	Isis‡ Rags‡ City Slicker‡
December 22, 1973	New York City	United States	Coventry	Isis‡ Rags‡ City Slicker‡
~~December 23, 1973~~	New York City	United States	Coventry	—N/a
December 31, 1973	New York City	United States	Academy of Music	Blue Öyster Cult†; Iggy Pop‡ Teenage Lust‡

List of 1974 concerts
Date	City	Country	Venue	Support Act(s)
January 8, 1974	New York City	United States	Village East	—N/a
January 26, 1974	New York City	United States	Academy of Music	Fleetwood Mac†; Silverhead‡

Support act key:

† Headliner
‡ Opening/supporting act

== Personnel ==
- Paul Stanley – vocals, rhythm guitar
- Gene Simmons – vocals, bass
- Peter Criss – drums, vocals
- Ace Frehley – lead guitar, backing vocals
