= Houston County Farm Center =

Multiple purposes arena in Dothan, Alabama

- Interactive map of Houston County Farm Center
- Address: 1701 E Cottonwood Rd, Dothan, AL 36301; Dothan, Alabama
- Coordinates: 31°11′38″N 85°22′26″W

The Houston County Farm Center is a 5,000-seat multi-purpose arena in Dothan, Alabama. It hosts locals sporting events and concerts. It took many months, but the revamped version of the building was completed in 2025.

== See also ==
- Houston County, Alabama
