= Triangle Universities Nuclear Laboratory =

Research center in Durham, North Carolina, U.S.

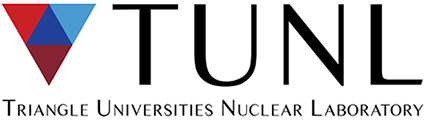
- Established: 1965
- Research type: Nuclear Physics
- Director: Arthur Champagne
- Staff: 100
- Location: Durham, North Carolina, United States
- Campus: TUNL is located on Duke University's West Campus
- Operating agency: Duke University, University of North Carolina at Chapel Hill, and North Carolina State University
- Website: www.tunl.duke.edu

The Triangle Universities Nuclear Laboratory, abbreviated as TUNL (pronounced as "tunnel"), is a tripartite research consortium operated by Duke University, the University of North Carolina at Chapel Hill, North Carolina State University and North Carolina Central University. The laboratory is located on the West Campus of Duke University in Durham, North Carolina. Researchers are now drawn from several other universities around the United States in addition to members from the founding universities. TUNL also participates in long term collaborations with universities and laboratories around the world. Funding for TUNL comes primarily from the United States Department of Energy Office of Nuclear Physics.

TUNL operates three laboratory facilities, all of which reside on Duke University's campus. Two of the facilities, the Tandem Accelerator Laboratory and the Laboratory for Experimental Nuclear Astrophysics, are low energy charged beam accelerators. The third facility is the High Intensity Gamma-Ray Source (HIGS), which produces the highest intensity polarized Gamma ray beams in the world. TUNL is also involved in off-site research projects, including the Majorana Demonstrator Experiment, an ongoing Double beta decay experiment at the Sanford Underground Research Facility in Lead, South Dakota.

== History ==
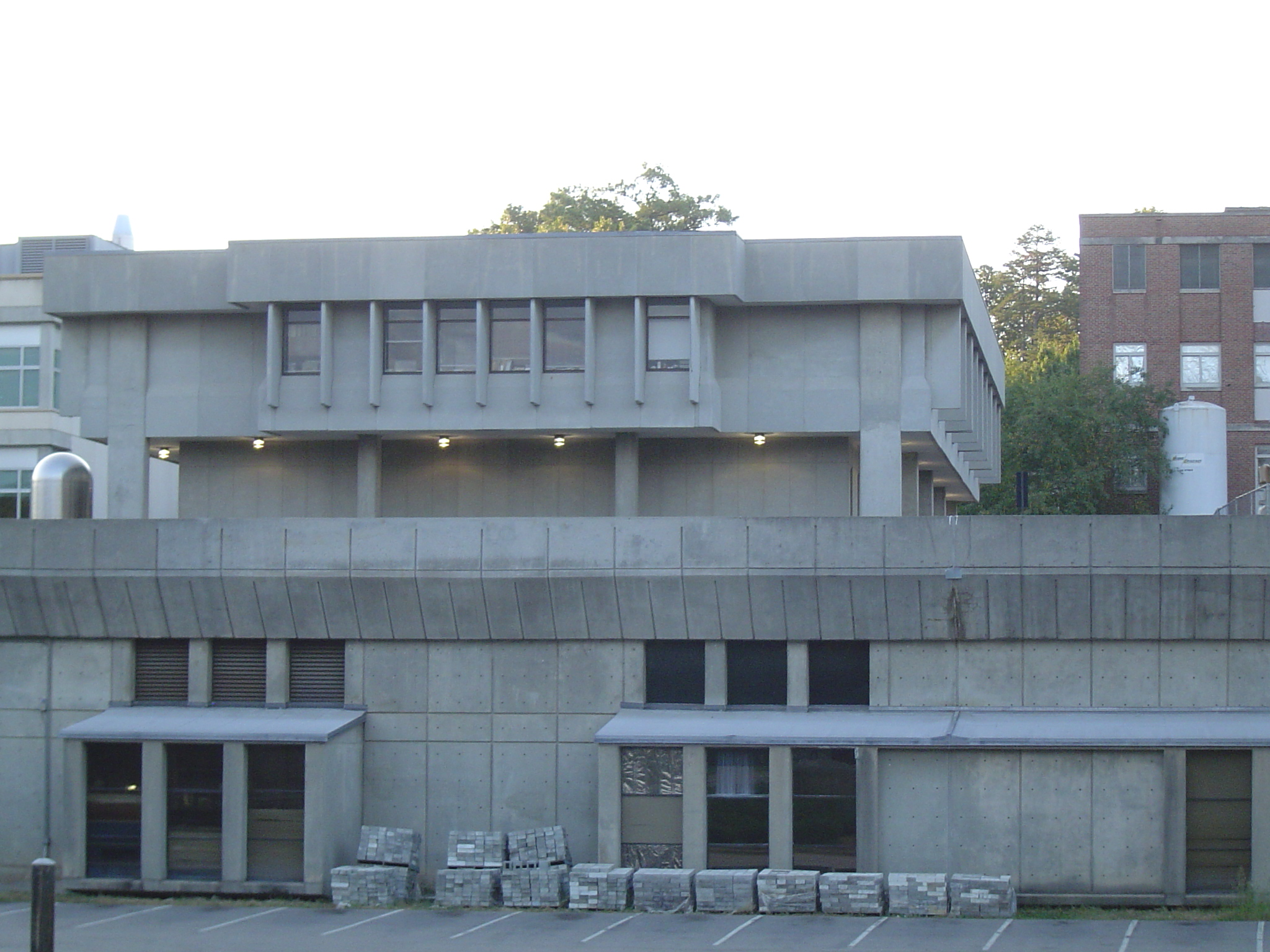
View of TUNL Lab Level

Research at TUNL is focused on nuclear physics, including studies on Fundamental symmetries, Neutrinos, Nuclear astrophysics, and Hadron structure. TUNL also conducts applied research, investigating the applications of nuclear physics to topics such as National security, Public health, and Plant physiology. The Triangle Universities Nuclear Laboratory was established in 1965, with a $2.5 Million grant from the United States Atomic Energy Commission providing the funding for a new 15 MeV Tandem Van de Graaff accelerator as well as a 15 MeV Cyclotron. After three years of construction and testing, the new accelerator facility became operational in December 1968. Henry Newson, a nuclear physics professor at Duke University, was responsible for the proposal, was the original proponent of combining the efforts of the three universities, and served as the first director of the new laboratory. The Tandem Generator and the Cyclotron at TUNL were combined into what was named a Cyclo-Graaff accelerator. Ions would first be accelerated in the Cyclotron. Then, once the initial energy was high enough, the beam from the cyclotron would be injected into the Tandem Generator where it would be further accelerated. Using the accelerators together effectively doubled the maximum energy that the lab could reach when compared to the energies of each individual accelerator. This combination, the Cyclo-Graaff, would be used by Henry Newson to study Nuclear Structure until his death in 1978.

== Facilities ==
=== Tandem Laboratory ===
An FN Tandem Van de Graaff Generator with a maximum terminal voltage of 10 Mega Volts. The facility can produce light ion beams made up of Protons, Deuterons, ^{3}He Nuclei, and ^{4}He Nuclei. The proton and neutron beams produced at the Tandem Laboratory are available either polarized or unpolarized depending on the experiment requirements. Through secondary beam collisions, the lab can also produce polarized neutron beams, allowing the lab to study neutron interactions. The Tandem Lab is primarily intended to study the Strong force at low energies. Research at Tandem includes few-nucleon dynamics, 2-nucleon transfer reactions, and neutron multiplication.

=== High Intensity Gamma-ray Source ===
The High Intensity Gamma-Ray Source (HIGS) produces gamma-rays by means of Compton backscattering. This occurs when photons from a Free-electron laser collide with accelerated Electrons, producing a beam of high energy photons with a very precise energy and a high degree of polarization. The gamma-ray beams can be produced with energies ranging from 1-100 MeV with a maximum intensity of 1000 $\gamma$/s/eV, making HIGS the highest intensity accelerator driven gamma-ray source in the world. Research at HIGS can be broken broadly into two groups: Nuclear Structure and Nuclear Astrophysics, with reactions such as ($\gamma$, $\gamma$'), ($\gamma$, n), and ($\gamma$, $\alpha$), along with Low-energy QCD, with studies on Compton scattering and Photo-Pion production.

=== Laboratory for Experimental Nuclear Astrophysics ===
The two accelerators housed at LENA combine to cover the entire range of energy values up to 1 MeV and produce beams that are both stable and intense. The lab focuses on light ion beams with high current that are optimized for applications to nuclear astrophysics. Research topics at LENA include the nuclear reactions that drive astrophysical processes such as Stellar evolution, Novae, and X-ray bursts.

== Education ==
Education in nuclear physics is provided at both a graduate and undergraduate level to students at the Triangle Universities Nuclear Laboratory. TUNL draws around 40 graduate students from the three founding universities. Graduates find employment in diverse settings, including faculty positions, industry positions, and positions at government research facilities and the National Laboratories. Graduates George A. Keyworth II and John H. Gibbons served as presidential science advisers to presidents Ronald Reagan and Bill Clinton respectively.

One component of undergraduate education provided by TUNL is the TUNL/Duke Research Experiences for Undergraduates, a ten-week program funded by the National Science Foundation offered during the summer with locations on TUNL's campus as well as a limited number of positions at CERN. Undergraduates from the three founding universities as well as other associated universities conduct research with faculty members throughout the year.
