= Illinois National Guard Armory (Rockford) =

- Rockford Illinois National Guard Armory
- U.S. National Register of Historic Places
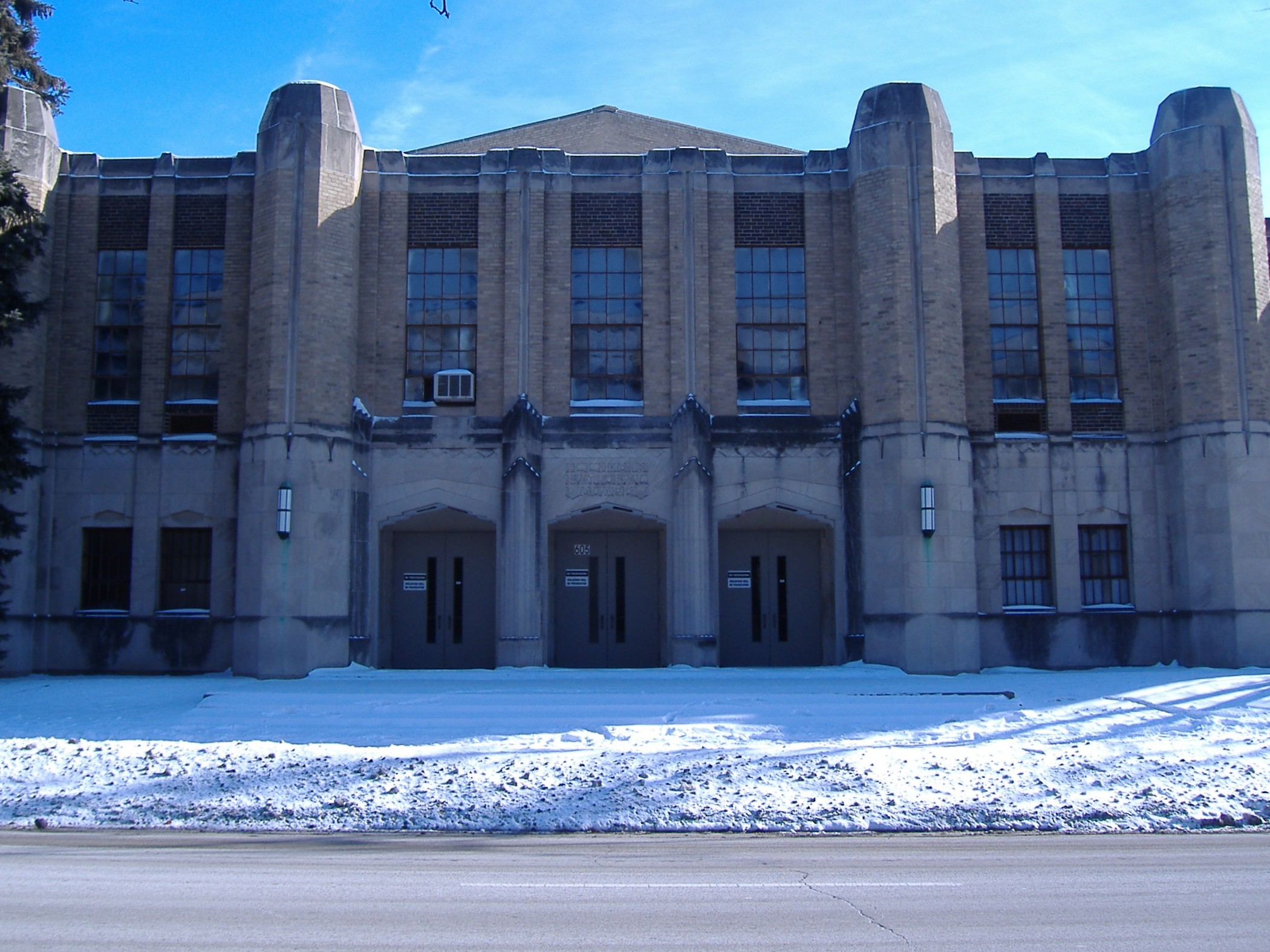
- Exterior of the Rockford, Illinois National Guard Armory.

- Location within Illinois Location within the United States
- Location: 605 N. Main St., Rockford, Illinois
- Coordinates: 42°16′33″N 89°5′26″W
- Area: 1.5 acres (0.61 ha)
- Built: 1936-1937
- Architect: Bradley & Bradley
- Architectural style: Art Deco
- NRHP reference No.: 00000948
- Added to NRHP: August 10, 2000

The Illinois National Guard Armory in Rockford, Illinois, is located at 605 Main St. and served as the headquarters for Illinois National Guard units of various designations for nearly 60 years. The building was added to the National Register of Historic Places in 2000.

The armory also was used as a music venue throughout the 1970s by bands including ZZ Top, Kiss, REO Speedwagon and Fleetwood Mac.

== National Guard use ==
Construction planning began in 1934 for the Illinois National Guard Armory in Rockford began with the selection of a site and architects for the project. With Bradley & Bradley signed on as architects and Sjostrom & Sons contracted for construction the project began in 1936. The firm of Benson Stone created unique stonework for the building's façade. The building was dedicated in 1937. Throughout the Second World War and into the Cold War, the Illinois National Guard occupied the facility. By 1941, the armory had seen its one millionth visitor.

In 1987, the State of Illinois designated the armory for repairs, allocating $490,000 for a new roof, wall repairs, window and door repairs, and other pertinent repair work. These repairs happened in 1989 and the armory was up to code for the 404th Chemical Brigade to occupy the facility in 1990. The 404th was activated on June 23, 1990, as the only Chemical Brigade in the Army National Guard force structure. The 404th stayed at the armory until March 1, 1993, when the National Guard vacated the Rockford armory and moved into the new Machesney Park Armory. With the National Guard gone the art deco building stood empty and open to new owners. Right after the Guard moved out, Illinois Governor Jim Edgar blocked the sale of the armory to a Chicago investor, Ken Goldberg. Goldberg had offered $61,000 for the property but Edgar cited building code violations on Goldberg's other properties as rationale for blocking the deal.

== Post National Guard use ==
The period from 1994 to 1999 saw the armory occupied by an educational facility and was a time period that was rife with controversy surrounding the transfer of and condition of the property. It was in 1994/1995 that Amcore Bank provided the OIC Vocational Institute with $300,000 in loans against its Accounts Receivable. The Institute expected federal grants for its status as an educational/job training facility as well as being a non-profit organization. However, according to the Illinois State Board of Education OIC was never accredited, despite this, at the time, the National Guard leased the armory to the OIC Institute. A year later, in 1996, Illinois State Senator Dave Syverson paved the way for OIC to purchase the armory property for $1, a dollar the National Guard claims it was never paid. In a Quit Claim Deed OIC agreed to use the armory for 20 years as an educational and job training facility or ownership will revert to the state.

The Institute would occupy the armory for less than two years. By 1997 OIC was teetering and the state was facing the prospect of having an empty Guard armory on its hands. Syverson and Illinois Representative Doug Scott, of Rockford, sponsor an amendment to remove the revert clause and ensure that the armory would stay out of state ownership. The amendment successfully became law and Amcore Bank placed a lien on the property. A year later the armory was put up as collateral as the loans were consolidated and renewed. Controversy surrounded the armory in 1999 as OIC Administrator Carl Towns claimed the National Guard had left the armory in disrepair, a claim National Guard Col. Joe Vecchio (Retired) refuted as false. The same year Towns complained about the armory's condition OIC went bankrupt and left the facility in the hands of Amcore Bank. The bank foreclosed on the property and began a search for a new owner.

As Amcore searched for a new owner, in 2000, local historic preservation activist Sylvia Doyle-Pagel sought landmark status for the armory. The bank's legal team was against this move and recommended to the Rockford City Council that the status be denied. The council went ahead with the designation anyway, despite the opposition of one of the city aldermen. Doyle-Pagel successfully petitioned for the armory's inclusion on the National Register of Historic Places and the status was granted on August 10, 2000.

In 2003 Mirador LLC took over ownership of the 1930s building and the armory stayed vacant. Finally in 2006 the building was donated to the City of Rockford by Jocelyn Blair-Stoller of Mirador LLC.
