= State Theater (Youngstown, Ohio) =

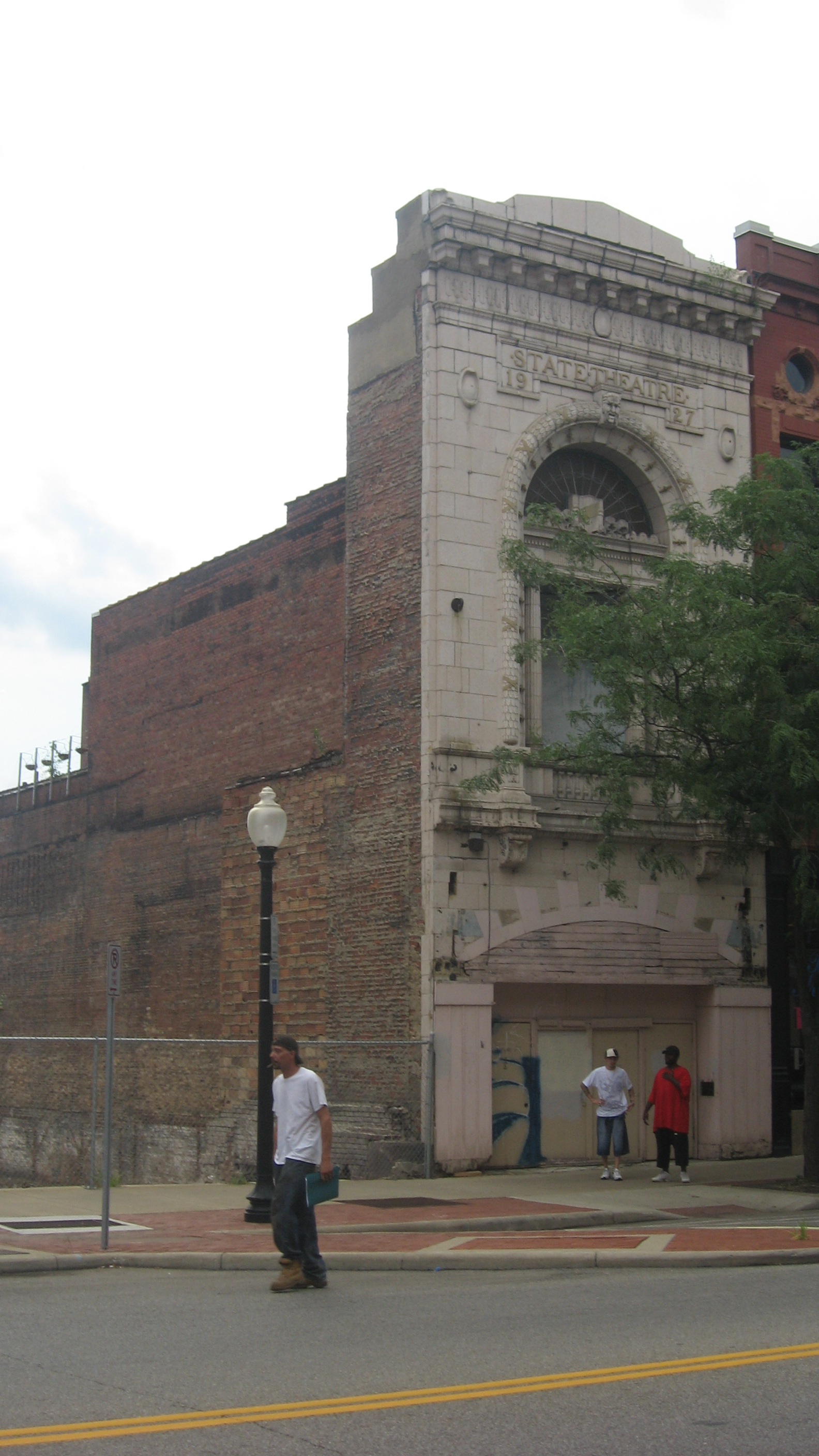
- Remains of the theater
- Interactive map of State Theater
- Former names: State Theatre Hall of Music; Tomorrow Club; Agora Theater; State Theater and Civic Center; Star Theatre; Star Palace
- Address: 213 Federal Plaza West; Youngstown, Ohio 44503
- Location: United States
- Coordinates: 41°6′4.09″N 80°39′7.96″W
- Capacity: 2,142
- Type: Concert hall
- Event: Rock

Construction
- Opened: 1927
- Renovated: 1974, 1978, 1986
- Closed: 1988
- Demolished: 2008

The State Theater was an entertainment venue in Youngstown, Ohio which showed films until the early 1970s and later became a popular night club establishment catering to major rock 'n' roll acts of the 1970s and '80s. The theater opened in 1927 at 213 Federal Plaza West and exhibited films until closing as a movie house in the early 1970s. On October 20, 1974, a night club called the Tomorrow Club opened in the old theater. Under the Tomorrow Club name, the venue hosted such bands as AC/DC, Kiss, Rush, Ted Nugent, The Runaways, Talking Heads, etc. Most notably the club played host to The Ramones' first gig outside of the New York City metro area on July 20, 1976. This was also the gig where Joey Ramone was introduced to future members of the Dead Boys who later moved to New York City to set up shop as the house band at CBGB. The Tomorrow Club closed on December 22, 1978, and the venue opened as the Youngstown branch of the Agora concert hall chain on December 31, 1978.The Youngstown Agora continued to book popular rock acts until it closed on July 23, 1982. It reopened under the State Theater and Civic Center name in May 1983, but it closed abruptly again in July 1983. The theater booked heavy metal and hard rock acts under the Star Theatre name from 1984 until early '86 before being bought by a group interested in turning the theater into a showcase for R&B, blues, jazz, hip-hop and soul groups in late 1986. The venue struggled under the Starr Palace name and closed for good in late 1988. The State Theater remained vacant until it was demolished in 2008. Only the facade remains.
