= Kiss Tour =

1974 concert tour by Kiss

- Promotional tour by Kiss
- Poster to the concert in Ontario, Canada
- Location: North America
- Associated album: Kiss
- Start date: February 5, 1974
- End date: October 4, 1974
- No. of shows: 84

Kiss concert chronology
- Club Tour (1973–1974); Kiss Tour (1974); Hotter than Hell Tour (1974–1975)

The Kiss Tour was Kiss' first album support tour. Sometimes known as the First Tour, it also encompassed several shows before and after the "official" dates.

== History ==
At the beginning of the tour Stanley returned to his iconic Starchild makeup after finishing the previous tour in his bandit makeup. Stage props used for this tour were fire engine lights, a drum riser, sparkling drumsticks, Simmons spitting blood and breathing fire, a lighted logo of the band's name, Frehley's smoking guitar and flamethrowers.

When the band was an opening act for Argent on May 2, 1974, in Comstock Park, they were only allowed to perform eight songs as Argent told them the rules, resulting in the headliners shutting off the power to Kiss' equipment when the audience wanted Kiss to perform more songs. Rush opened for Kiss at the Centennial Hall in London, Ontario on July 25 during the tour, which was also John Rutsey's final performance with Rush. The opening act ended up impressing the band so much at that concert that they continued on tour with Rush as the opening act. Kiss took most of August off from the tour to record their follow-up album, Hotter than Hell.

In the tour program for the band's final tour, Simmons reflected on the tour:

Being in Kiss in the very first year and touring around the United States, we felt like we were taking off. It was like somebody pushing you into the deep end of the pool whether you can swim or not. The early years of Kiss were far from glamorous. We rode in a station wagon hundreds of miles every day. We would take turns driving and sleeping in the back. We ate burgers at roadside taverns. We stopped and peed on the side of long stretches of highway when we couldn't find a town anywhere near. We ate beans and franks, because we couldn't afford better food as we were on a $85 a week salary! Becoming a rock star was better than anything and beyond anything I ever imagined. There were moments of doubt for me that we were gonna make it.

== Reception ==
A reporter from the Winnipeg Free Press who attended the Taché Hall performance in Winnipeg on February 8 which was part of the "Festival of Life and Learning", noted the number of visual effects that notably were smoke bombs, dry ice on the song "Firehouse", as well as the flashing lights and hydraulic lift for the drummer. The reporter however, noted the responses from the audience who were shocked, with others in attendance "sitting on their hands for the majority of the performance".

== Tour dates ==
List of 1974 concerts
Date	City	Country	Venue	Support Act(s)
February 5, 1974	Edmonton	Canada	Dinwoodie Lounge	Barbarossa
February 6, 1974	Calgary	Canada	SAIT Gymnasium	Barbarossa
February 8, 1974	Winnipeg	Canada	Taché Hall	Mood Jga Jga
February 17, 1974	Long Beach	United States	Civic Auditorium	Rory Gallagher; Fleetwood Mac
February 18, 1974	Los Angeles	United States	Los Angeles Room	—N/a
February 21, 1974	Los Angeles	United States	Aquarius Theater	—N/a
March 22, 1974	Devon	United States	Valley Forge Music Fair	Redbone
March 23, 1974	New York City	United States	Academy of Music	Argent; Redbone
March 24, 1974	Owings Mills	United States	Painter's Mill Music Fair	Aerosmith; Redbone
March 25, 1974	Washington, D.C.	United States	The Bayou	—N/a
March 29, 1974	Asbury Park	United States	Sunshine In Concert Hall	Renaissance; Truth
March 31, 1974	St. Louis	United States	Aviation Field	Thirteenth Floor
April 1, 1974	Cleveland	United States	Agora Ballroom	Rory Gallagher
April 3, 1974	Columbus	United States	The Agora	Rory Gallagher
April 7, 1974	Detroit	United States	Michigan Palace	Aerosmith; Mojo Boogie Band; Michael Fennelly
April 8, 1974	Dekalb	United States	University Center Ballroom	Conqueror Worm
April 12, 1974	Detroit	United States	Michigan Palace	Blue Öyster Cult; Suzi Quatro
April 13, 1974	Detroit	United States	Michigan Palace	Blue Öyster Cult; Suzi Quatro
April 14, 1974	Louisville	United States	Beggar's Banquet	Thunderhead
April 15, 1974	Nashville	United States	Muther's Music Emporium	Max Onion
April 16, 1974	Nashville	United States	Muther's Music Emporium	Max Onion
April 17, 1974	Memphis	United States	Lafayette Music Room	Kathi McDonald
April 18, 1974	Memphis	United States	Lafayette Music Room	Kathi McDonald
April 19, 1974	Chicago	United States	Aragon Ballroom	Quicksilver Messenger Service; Flying Saucer; Les Variations
April 21, 1974	Charlotte	United States	Flash's	Ritual
April 27, 1974	Passaic	United States	Capitol Theatre	Blue Öyster Cult; Ross
May 2, 1974	Comstock Park	United States	Thunder Chicken	Argent
May 3, 1974	St. Louis	United States	Ambassador Theatre	Argent
May 9, 1974	Parsippany	United States	The Joint in the Woods	Sweetwater
May 12, 1974	Wyandotte	United States	Benjamin Yack Recreational Center	Savoy Brown; Silverhead
May 14, 1974	Fraser	United States	Fraser Hockeyland Arena	Savoy Brown; Silverhead
May 16, 1974	Winnipeg	Canada	Centennial Concert Hall	Savoy Brown; Manfred Mann's Earth Band
May 17, 1974	Edmonton	Canada	Kinsmen Fieldhouse	Savoy Brown; Manfred Mann's Earth Band
May 18, 1974	Saskatoon	Canada	Saskatoon Arena	Savoy Brown; Manfred Mann's Earth Band
May 19, 1974	Lethbridge	Canada	Exhibition Pavilion	Savoy Brown; Manfred Mann's Earth Band
May 20, 1974	Calgary	Canada	Foothills Arena	Savoy Brown; Manfred Mann's Earth Band
May 24, 1974	Portland	United States	Paramount Northwest Theater	Savoy Brown; Manfred Mann's Earth Band
May 25, 1974	Seattle	United States	Paramount Theatre	Savoy Brown; Manfred Mann's Earth Band
May 26, 1974	Spokane	United States	JFK Pavilion	Savoy Brown; Manfred Mann's Earth Band
May 27, 1974	Olympia	United States	St. Martin's Capitol Pavilion	Savoy Brown
May 28, 1974	Vancouver	Canada	PNE Gardens Auditorium	Savoy Brown; Manfred Mann's Earth Band
May 30, 1974	San Diego	United States	Sports Arena	Savoy Brown; Manfred Mann's Earth Band
May 31, 1974	Long Beach	United States	Long Beach Auditorium	Savoy Brown; Manfred Mann's Earth Band
June 1, 1974	San Francisco	United States	Winterland Ballroom	Savoy Brown; Manfred Mann's Earth Band
June 3, 1974	Anchorage	United States	Sundowner Drive-In Theater	Savoy Brown; Flight; Island
June 4, 1974	Fairbanks	United States	Baker Field House	Savoy Brown
June 12, 1974	Flint	United States	IMA Sports Arena	New York Dolls
June 14, 1974	Cleveland	United States	Allen Theater	New York Dolls
June 15, 1974	Toronto	Canada	Massey Hall	New York Dolls
June 17, 1974	Asbury Park	United States	Sunshine In	Truth
June 19, 1974	Atlanta	United States	Alex Cooley's Electric Ballroom	Outlaw
June 20, 1974	Atlanta	United States	Alex Cooley's Electric Ballroom	Outlaw
June 21, 1974	Atlanta	United States	Alex Cooley's Electric Ballroom	Outlaw
June 22, 1974	Atlanta	United States	Alex Cooley's Electric Ballroom	Outlaw
July 11, 1974	West Palm Beach	United States	West Palm Beach Auditorium	Blue Öyster Cult; Nazareth
July 12, 1974	Orlando	United States	Jai Alai Fronton	Blue Öyster Cult; Nazareth
July 13, 1974	Tampa Bay	United States	Curtis Hixon Hall	Blue Öyster Cult; Nazareth
July 14, 1974	Birmingham	United States	Birmingham Municipal Auditorium	Blue Öyster Cult; Nazareth
July 16, 1974	Baton Rouge	United States	Independence Hall	Blue Öyster Cult; New York Dolls
July 17, 1974	Atlanta	United States	Alex Cooley's Electric Ballroom	Fat Chance
July 18, 1974	Atlanta	United States	Alex Cooley's Electric Ballroom	Fat Chance
July 19, 1974	Fayetteville	United States	Cumberland Auditorium	Blue Öyster Cult; Nazareth; Glass Moon
July 25, 1974	London	Canada	Centennial Hall	Rush; Ronny Legge
August 3, 1974	Indianapolis	United States	Convention Center	Blue Öyster Cult; James Gang; Chris Jagger
August 4, 1974	South Bend	United States	Morris Civic Auditorium	Blue Öyster Cult
September 13, 1974	Kitchener	Canada	Sir Wilfrid Laurier Theater	Fludd
September 14, 1974	Toronto	Canada	Victory Theater	Fludd
September 15, 1974	Lock Haven	United States	Lockhaven Fieldhouse	Blue Öyster Cult; Rush
September 16, 1974	Wilkes-Barre	United States	Paramount Theater	Blue Öyster Cult; Rush
September 18, 1974	Atlanta	United States	Electric Ballroom	Rush; Fat Chance
September 19, 1974	Atlanta	United States	Electric Ballroom	Rush; Fat Chance
September 20, 1974	Atlanta	United States	Electric Ballroom	Rush; Fat Chance
September 21, 1974	Atlanta	United States	Electric Ballroom	Outlaws; Fat Chance
September 28, 1974	Detroit	United States	Michigan Palace	Roy Wood; Wizzard
September 30, 1974	Evansville	United States	Evansville Stadium	Billy Preston; Rush
October 1, 1974	Jacksonville	United States	Leone Cole Auditorium	Rush
October 4, 1974	Houston	United States	Music Hall	Rush

== Personnel ==
- Paul Stanley – vocals, rhythm guitar
- Gene Simmons – vocals, bass
- Peter Criss – drums, vocals
- Ace Frehley – lead guitar, backing vocals
