= Ellis Auditorium =

Former arena in Memphis, Tennessee

- Interactive map of the Ellis Auditorium area
- Former names: Memphis Auditorium and Market House

General information
- Location: Memphis, Tennessee
- Coordinates: 35°09′3.0″N 90°3′04.4″W
- Opened: 1924
- Closed: 1997
- Demolished: 1999

Design and construction
- Architect: George Awsumb

The Ellis Auditorium was a 10,000-seat multi-purpose arena in Memphis, Tennessee, USA. It hosted local sporting events and concerts.

== History ==
The auditorium opened in 1924 as a multipurpose concert hall, convention center, and athletic arena. The first performance was held by John Philip Sousa. The building opened as the Memphis Auditorium and Market House and was renamed for Memphis Chamber of Commerce President Robert R. Ellis after his death in 1930.

The auditorium was segregated and had a separate entrance and balcony for black patrons, and in 1945 a performance of Annie, Get Your Gun did not go ahead because the cast included black members.

Elvis Presley played Ellis Auditorium on May 15, 1956, to open the Cotton Carnival. Presley also made a number of other appearances at the venue.

Other performers who played Ellis include David Bowie (1972) and Bruce Springsteen (1976 and 1996).

== Sports ==
Ellis Auditorium also hosted basketball events, including a 6,000-strong all-white crowd who watched the all-black Harlem Globetrotters play in 1953.

The Memphis Tigers basketball team also played select games at Ellis. They upset number 3 ranked Louisville at the venue in February 1957.

Ellis Auditorium was demolished in 1999 and replaced by the Cannon Center for the Performing Arts at the same location.
