= Kiss (band) =

American rock band

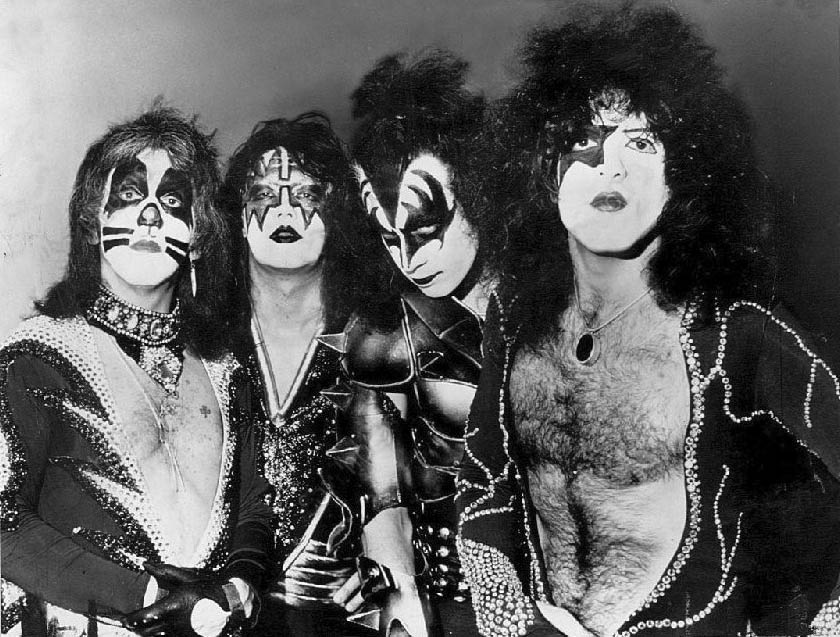
- The original lineup of Kiss in 1976 (L–R): Peter Criss, Ace Frehley, Gene Simmons, Paul Stanley

Background information
- Origin: New York City, U.S.
- Genres: Hard rock; heavy metal; shock rock; glam metal
- Works: Discography
- Years active: 1973–2023; 2025–2026
- Labels: Casablanca; Mercury; Roadrunner; Kiss; Universal
- Spinoffs: Frehley's Comet; Vinnie Vincent Invasion; White Tiger; Union; ESP; Paul Stanley's Soul Station; Gene Simmons Band
- Spinoff of: Wicked Lester
- Past members: Paul Stanley; Gene Simmons; Ace Frehley; Peter Criss; Eric Carr; Vinnie Vincent; Mark St. John; Bruce Kulick; Eric Singer; Tommy Thayer
- Website: kissonline.com
- Logo

Kiss (commonly styled in all caps as KISS) was an American rock band formed in New York City in 1973 by Paul Stanley (vocals, rhythm guitar), Gene Simmons (vocals, bass guitar), Ace Frehley (lead guitar, vocals) and Peter Criss (drums, vocals). Known for their face paint and stage outfits, the group rose to prominence in the mid-1970s with shock rock–style live performances that featured fire-breathing, blood-spitting, smoking guitars, shooting rockets, levitating drum kits and pyrotechnics. The band went through several lineup changes, starting with drummer Eric Carr replacing original drummer Peter Criss in 1980, with Stanley and Simmons remaining the only consistent members. The final lineup consisted of Stanley, Simmons, Tommy Thayer (lead guitar, vocals) and Eric Singer (drums, vocals).

With their makeup and costumes, the band members took on the personas of comic book-style characters: the Starchild (Stanley), the Demon (Simmons), the Spaceman or Space Ace (Frehley), and the Catman (Criss). During the second half of the 1970s, Kiss became one of America's most successful rock bands and a pop culture phenomenon. The band's commercial success declined during the early 1980s; however, it experienced a resurgence in 1983 when the band members began performing without makeup and costumes, marking the beginning of the band's "unmasked" era that would last until 1996. The first album of this era, 1983's platinum-certified Lick It Up, successfully introduced the band to a new generation of fans, and its music videos received regular airplay on MTV. In response to a wave of Kiss nostalgia in the mid-1990s, the original lineup reunited in 1996; at this time, the band resumed using makeup and stage costumes. The resulting 1996–1997 reunion tour was the band's most successful, grossing $143.7 million. In January 2019, Kiss began its final worldwide tour, and the band retired after performing its final show in New York City in December 2023. They have since reunited occasionally to attend Kiss-related events and record new music.

Kiss is regarded as one of the most influential rock bands of all time, as well as one of the best selling bands of all time. Kiss has also earned 30 Gold albums, the most of any band from the United States. Kiss has earned 14 Platinum albums, three of which earned multi-Platinum status. The four original members of Kiss (Simmons, Stanley, Criss, and Frehley) were inducted into the Rock and Roll Hall of Fame in April 2014. Kiss was ranked by MTV as the ninth-greatest metal band of all time, placed tenth on VH1's "100 Greatest Artists of Hard Rock" list, was ranked as the third "Best Metal and Hard Rock Live Band of All Time" by Loudwire magazine, and was placed sixteenth by the British magazine Classic Rock on their "The 50 Best Rock Bands of All Time" list.

== History ==
=== 1971–1975: early years ===
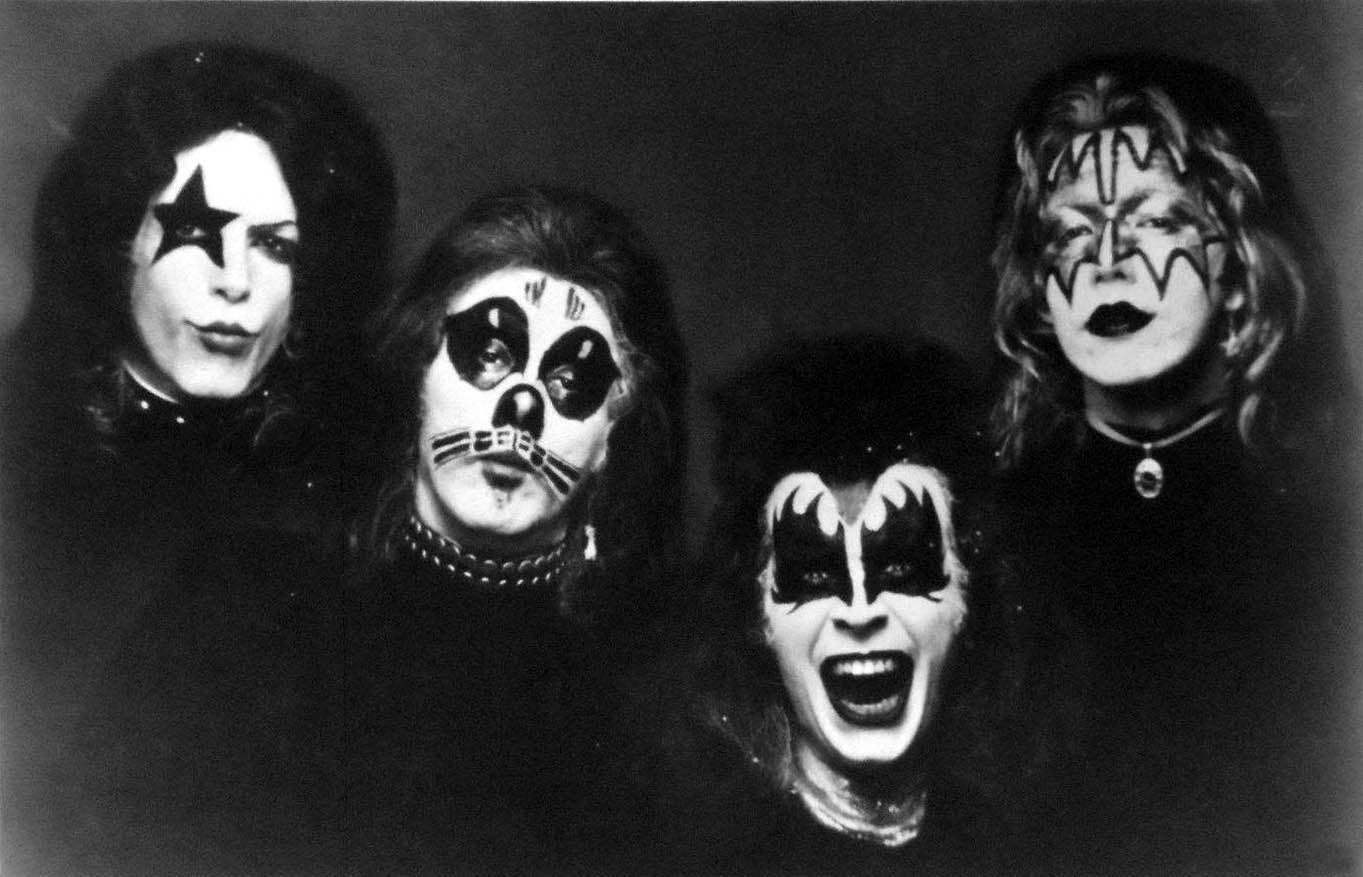
Kiss's original lineup in 1974. L–R: Paul Stanley, Peter Criss, Gene Simmons, Ace Frehley

Kiss traces its roots to Wicked Lester, a New York City–based rock band led by Gene Simmons and Paul Stanley. That band recorded one album, which was shelved by Epic Records, and played a handful of live shows. Simmons and Stanley, feeling a new musical direction was needed, abandoned Wicked Lester in 1972 and began forming a new group.

Kiss was formed in 1973. After breaking up Wicked Lester late in 1972, Simmons and Stanley came across an ad in the East Coast version of Rolling Stone placed by Peter Criss, a drummer from the New York City scene who had previously played in the bands Lips and Chelsea. Simmons and Stanley met Criss in a nightclub where he was playing drums. After hearing Criss sing, they thought Criss should be in the new band they were forming. Criss then auditioned for, and later joined their new band. The three focused on a much harder style of rock than that played by Wicked Lester. In November 1972, the band played a showcase for Epic Records A&R director Don Ellis, in an effort to secure a record deal. In early January 1973, the group added lead guitarist Ace Frehley. Frehley impressed the group with his first audition, and was asked back for a second audition. A few weeks after Frehley joined, the classic lineup was solidified as the band to be named Kiss. They also began experimenting with their image, by wearing makeup and various outfits.

The Kiss logo

Stanley came up with the name while he, Simmons, and Criss were driving around New York City. Criss mentioned that he had been in a band called Lips, so Stanley said something to the effect of "What about Kiss?". Frehley created the now-iconic logo, making the "SS" look like lightning bolts, when he went to write the new band name over "Wicked Lester" on a poster outside the club where they were going to play. (Some of Wicked Lester's artwork included one lightning bolt for the "S" in Lester.) Later, Stanley designed the logo with a Sharpie and a ruler and accidentally drew the two S's nonparallel because he did it "by eye". The art department asked him if he wanted it to be redrafted to be perfect and he said, "It got us this far; let's leave well enough alone. Our number one rule has always been no rules."

Modified Kiss logo used in Germany, Austria, and other countries that outlaw Nazi symbols

The letters happened to look similar to the insignia of the Nazi SS, a symbol that is outlawed in Germany by Section 86a of the German criminal code. However, Simmons and Stanley, both Jewish, have denied any intentional likeness to Nazi symbolism in the logo. Since 1980, most of the band's album covers and merchandise in Germany have used a different logo, in which the letters "SS" look like the letters "ZZ" backwards. This logo is also used in Austria, Switzerland, Lithuania, and Hungary to avoid controversy.

The band's name has repeatedly been the subject of rumors pertaining to alleged hidden meanings. Among these rumors are theories that the name is an acronym for "Knights in Satan's Service", "Kinder SS", or "Kids in Satan's Service". Simmons has denied all of these claims.

The first Kiss performance took place on January 30, 1973, for an audience of fewer than ten people at the Popcorn Club (renamed Coventry shortly afterward) in Queens. The band was paid $50 for performing two sets that evening, following a cold-call Simmons had made to the venue, convincing them to hire the new band for a three-night stand. For the first three gigs, January 30 to February 1, they wore makeup, but the iconic character designs associated with Kiss made their debuts during the March 9–10 shows at The Daisy in Amityville, New York.

Our first show ever was at Coventry. Coventry was a study in contrasts. The first time we played there was nobody there. The last time we played there, you could barely get in the door.

— Paul Stanley

On March 13 of that year, the band recorded a five-song demo tape with producer Eddie Kramer. Former TV director Bill Aucoin, who had seen the group at a handful of showcase concerts in the summer of 1973, offered to become the band's manager in mid-October. Kiss agreed, with the condition that Aucoin signed the band to a record label within two weeks. On November 1, 1973, Kiss became the first act signed to former teen pop singer and Buddah Records executive Neil Bogart's new label, Casablanca Records.

The band entered Bell Sound Studios in New York City on October 10, 1973, to begin recording its first album. On December 31, the band had its official industry premiere at the Academy of Music in New York City, opening for Blue Öyster Cult. It was at this concert that, for the first of many times, Simmons accidentally set his hair (which was coated in hairspray) ablaze while performing his fire-breathing routine. His trademark stalking stage-moves were inspired by the creature Ymir of the movie 20 Million Miles to Earth.

Kiss's first tour started on February 5, 1974, at a cafeteria at the Northern Alberta Institute of Technology in Edmonton, Alberta, as an opening act. The band's self-titled debut album was released on February 18. Casablanca and Kiss promoted the album heavily throughout the spring and summer of 1974.

Being in Kiss in the very first year and touring around the United States, we felt like we were taking off. It was like somebody pushing you into the deep end of the pool, whether you can swim or not. The early years of Kiss were far from glamorous. We rode in a station wagon hundreds of miles every day. We would take turns driving and sleeping in the back. We ate burgers at roadside taverns. We stopped and peed on the side of long stretches of a highway when we couldn't find a town anywhere near. We ate beans and franks because we couldn't afford better food as we were on an $85 a week salary! Becoming a rock star was better than anything and beyond anything I ever imagined. There were moments of doubt for me that we were gonna make it.

— Gene Simmons

On February 19, in its first television appearance, the band performed "Nothin' to Lose", "Firehouse" and "Black Diamond" on ABC's In Concert (aired March 29). On April 29, the band performed "Firehouse" on The Mike Douglas Show. This broadcast included Simmons's first televised interview, a conversation with Mike Douglas in which Simmons declared himself "evil incarnate", eliciting uncomfortable reactions from a confused studio audience. Fellow Jewish-American guest Totie Fields said it would be humorous if beneath all the makeup Simmons was "just a nice Jewish boy". Simmons responded, "You should only know", to which Fields replied, "I do. You can't hide the hook", a reference to the stereotypical "Jewish" nose.

Despite the publicity and constant touring, Kiss initially sold just 75,000 copies. Meanwhile, the group and Casablanca Records were losing money quickly. The band (while touring) stopped in Los Angeles in August 1974 to begin recording its second album, Hotter Than Hell, which was released on October 22, 1974. The only single, "Let Me Go, Rock 'n' Roll", failed to chart, and the album stalled at No. 100.

With Hotter Than Hell quickly dropping off the charts, Kiss was pulled from its tour to quickly record a new album. Casablanca head Bogart stepped in to produce the next album, trading in the murky, distorted sound of Hotter Than Hell for a cleaner and slightly poppier sound. Dressed to Kill, released on March 19, 1975, fared slightly better commercially than Hotter Than Hell. It also contained what later became the band's signature song, "Rock and Roll All Nite".

Although Kiss albums had not proved to be big sellers, the band was quickly gaining a reputation for its live performances. Kiss concerts featured such spectacles as Simmons spitting "blood" (an effect made primarily from eggs, yogurt, red food coloring, and maple syrup) and "breathing fire" (spitting flammable liquid at a torch), Frehley soloing as his guitar burst into flames (light and smoke bombs placed inside the guitar), Criss's elevating drum riser that emitted sparks, Stanley's Townshend-style guitar smashing, and pyrotechnics throughout the show.

By mid-1975, Casablanca was almost bankrupt, and Kiss was in danger of losing its record contract. Both parties desperately needed a commercial breakthrough if they were to survive. That breakthrough came in an unlikely form: a "double live" album.

=== 1975–1978: rise to prominence ===
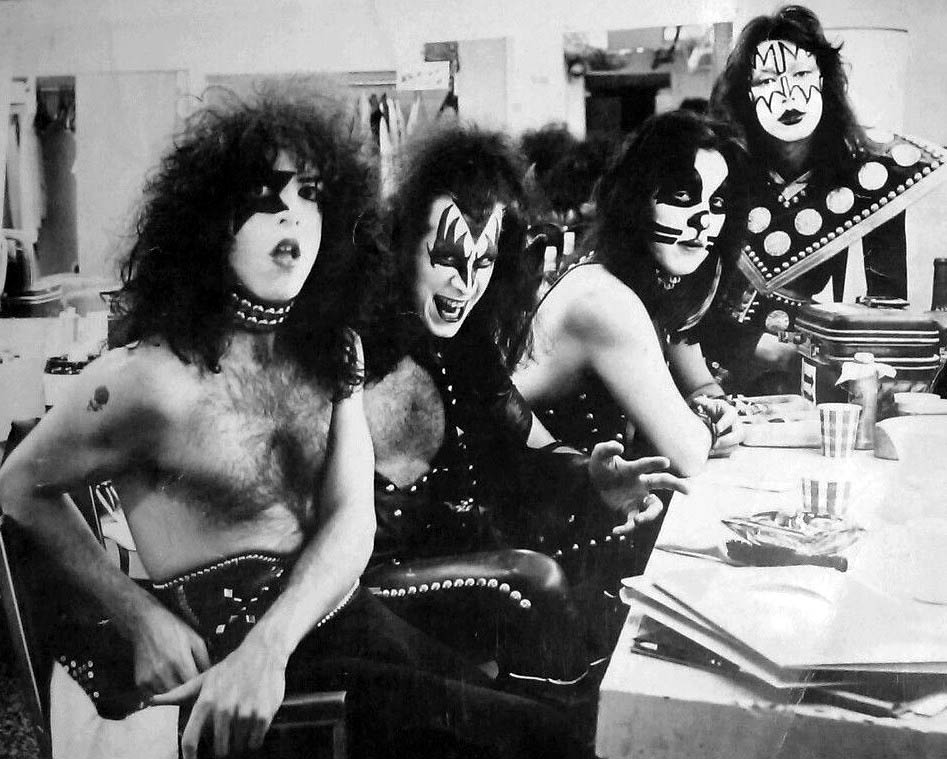
Kiss backstage in 1975

I saw a pattern emerging with us on the road. Every night, I'd ask somebody before the show, "How are we doing?", which meant, "What's the attendance?" One night they said, "It's sold out," and then the next night I'd hear the same thing. All of a sudden it was becoming the norm. For me the first realization that things were on an upswing was when we played the Hara Arena in Dayton, Ohio. Before the show I went on stage, looked out through the curtain and saw this big crowd, and said to myself, "My God, this is really happening!"

— Paul Stanley

Kiss wanted to express the excitement felt at its concerts (which its studio albums had so far failed to do) with its first live album. Compiled from concerts recorded between May and July in Wildwood, New Jersey, Detroit and Cleveland, and released on September 10, 1975, Alive! achieved Gold status and spawned Kiss's first top 40 single: a live version of "Rock and Roll All Nite". It was the first version of the song with a guitar solo, and this recording has become the best-known version. It is also the basis of most covers, such as the cover by Poison in 1987. In recent years, the band admitted that additional audience noise had been added to the album, as well as overdubs on selected guitar and vocal spots, not to deceive fans, but to add more "excitement and realism" to the record.

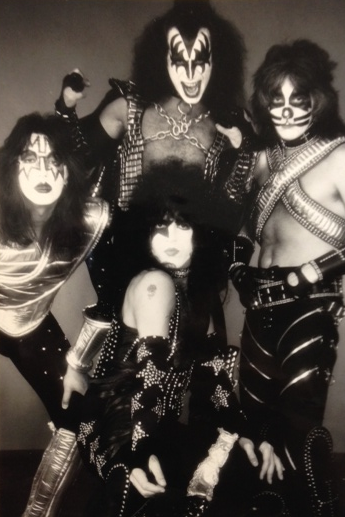
Kiss in 1977

The success of Alive! not only brought Kiss the breakthrough they had been seeking but arguably saved Casablanca, which was close to bankruptcy. Following this success, Kiss partnered with producer Bob Ezrin, who had previously worked with Alice Cooper. The result was Destroyer (released March 15, 1976), Kiss's most musically ambitious studio album to date. Destroyer, with its rather intricate production (using an orchestra, choir, and numerous tape effects), was a departure from the raw sound of the first three studio albums. Album art was designed by Ken Kelly, who had drawn Tarzan and Conan the Barbarian and also produced album covers for acts such as Rainbow and Manowar. While the album sold well initially and became the group's second Gold album, it quickly dropped down the charts. Only when the ballad "Beth", the B-side of the single "Detroit Rock City", began to gain more airplay on FM radio did the album's sales rebound. The single was subsequently reissued with the A- and B-sides reversed. "Beth" peaked at No. 7 on the Billboard Hot 100, becoming the band's first Top 10 single in the United States.

In October 1976, Kiss appeared on The Paul Lynde Halloween Special (aired on ABC the 29th), lip-synching "Detroit Rock City", "Beth" and "King of the Night Time World". The show, co-produced by Bill Aucoin, helped introduce Kiss to an even wider audience. In addition to the three songs, Kiss was the subject of a brief comedic "interview" conducted by Paul Lynde. This included Lynde noting, when hearing the members' first names, "Oh, I love a good religious group."

Two more highly successful studio albums were released in less than a year: Rock and Roll Over (November 11, 1976) and Love Gun (June 30, 1977). A second live album, Alive II, was released on October 14, 1977. All three albums were certified Platinum soon after their release. Between 1976 and 1978, Kiss earned $17.7 million from record royalties and music publishing. A 1977 Gallup poll named Kiss the most popular band in America. In Japan, Kiss performed five sold-out shows at Tokyo's Budokan Hall, equaling the record set by the Beatles in 1966 with their five concerts there.

When we played in Japan in the late '70s, nothing could prepare you for the hysteria because when people are telling you how big you are, you're big compared to what? Until you're faced with mass hysteria it doesn't really sink in. For you not having been in a certain country makes them that much more rabid for you to go.

— Paul Stanley

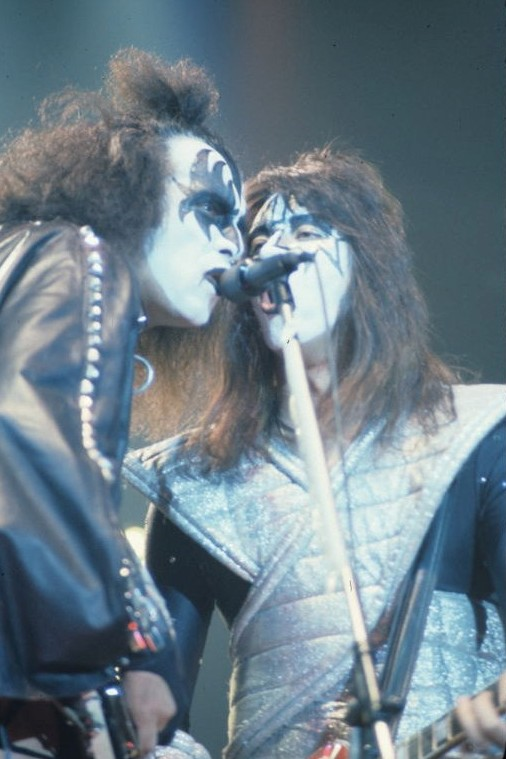
Simmons and Frehley sharing a microphone in 1978

In May 1977, Kiss made the first of its many comic book appearances, in Howard the Duck issue 12, published by Marvel Comics.

The first Kiss compilation album, Double Platinum, was issued on April 2, 1978. This double album included many remixed versions of the band's hits, as well as "Strutter '78", a re-recorded version of a song from the group's first album. At Bogart's request, this version of the song featured a disco influence.

During this period, Kiss merchandise became a substantial source of income for the group. Some of the products released included a pair of comic books issued by Marvel (the first contained ink mixed with actual blood donated by the group), a pinball machine, dolls, "Kiss Your Face Makeup" kits, Halloween masks, board games, lunch boxes, trading cards and many other pieces of memorabilia. Membership in the Kiss Army, the band's fan club, was in the six figures. Between 1977 and 1979, worldwide merchandise sales (in-store and on tour) reached an estimated $100 million.

=== 1978: Solo and film projects ===
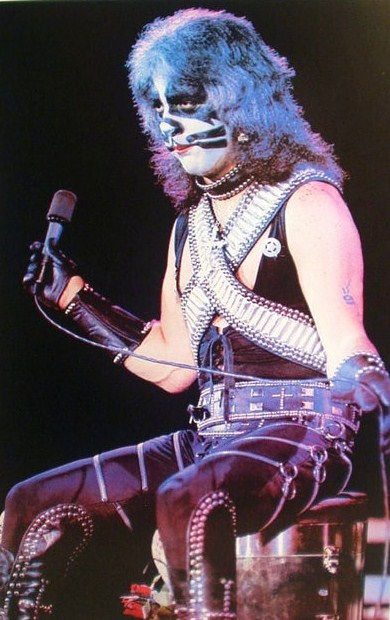
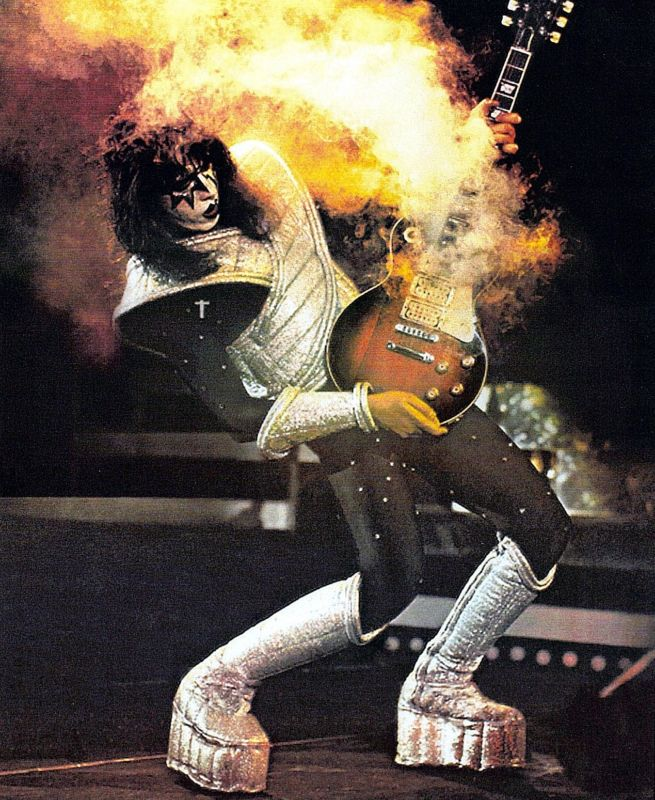
(Left): Criss performing "Beth" in 1977; (right): Frehley demonstrates the pyrotechnics that helped make Kiss a live sensation.

Alive II was the band's fourth Platinum album in just under two years, and the ensuing tour had the highest average attendance in the group's history. In addition, Kiss's gross income for 1977 was $10.2 million. The group, along with manager Aucoin, sought to push the brand harder. To that end, an ambitious, two-pronged strategy was devised for 1978.

The first part involved the simultaneous release of four solo albums from the members of Kiss. Although Kiss has claimed that the solo albums were intended to ease rising tensions within the band, its 1976 record contract did in fact call for four solo records, each of them counting as half an album toward the group's five-record commitment. Each album was a solo effort (none of the group appeared on another's album), however all were released and marketed as Kiss albums (with similar cover art and poster inserts). It was the first time that all current members of a rock band had released solo albums on the same day.

For the band members, it was a chance to showcase their individual musical styles and tastes outside of Kiss, and in some cases to collaborate with contemporary artists. Stanley's and Frehley's albums were most similar to Kiss's hard rock style, while Criss's album featured an R&B style including ballads. Simmons's was the most diverse of the four, featuring hard rock, ballads, Beatles-influenced pop and a cover version of "When You Wish Upon a Star" from the Disney film Pinocchio. Simmons's many collaborators included Aerosmith's Joe Perry, Cheap Trick's Rick Nielsen, the Doobie Brothers' Jeff "Skunk" Baxter, Donna Summer, Janis Ian, Helen Reddy, Bob Seger, Katey Sagal, and his then-girlfriend Cher.

The solo albums were released on September 18, 1978. Casablanca spent $2.5 million on the marketing campaign for the albums, and announced they were shipping five million copies, guaranteeing Platinum status. Despite the large shipments, none of the albums sold particularly well and were later sold as cut-outs. Of the four, Simmons's album charted the highest in the U.S., peaking at No. 22, while Frehley's spawned the only resulting Top Forty hit single, a cover of "New York Groove", written by Russ Ballard and originally performed by Hello. Frehley's album has gone on to be the biggest seller since the introduction of Soundscan in 1991.

The second part of Kiss's and Aucoin's plan called for the band to appear in a film that would cement its image of larger-than-life rock-and-roll superheroes. Filming commenced in the spring of 1978. Although the project was proposed to the band as a cross between A Hard Day's Night and Star Wars, the final result fell far short of those expectations. The final product, Kiss Meets the Phantom of the Park, debuted on NBC on October 28, 1978. It was released theatrically, after many changes, outside the U.S. in 1979 under the title Attack of the Phantoms. The band members were unhappy with the finished film and would speak about their filmmaking experience in later interviews with a mix of humorous embarrassment and regret. They felt that the film portrayed them more as clowns than superheroes. The artistic failure of the film led to a rift between the band and Aucoin.

=== 1979–1983: final makeup years ===
Kiss's first album of new material in two years, Dynasty (1979), continued the band's Platinum streak. The disco-flavored "I Was Made for Lovin' You" became one of the band's biggest hit singles to date, peaking at No. 11. Session drummer Anton Fig performed almost all the percussion on the album while Criss recovered from an automobile accident. The only song to feature Criss's drumming was "Dirty Livin'", on which he also sang lead. The album is also notable due to Frehley singing three lead vocals versus Simmons's two, which he put down to increased confidence following the success of his solo album.

Billed as "The Return of Kiss", the Dynasty Tour was expected by Kiss and their management to build on the success of previous tours. Plans were drawn up for a Kiss-themed traveling amusement park called "Kiss World", but were abandoned because of the immense costs involved; however, "The Return of Kiss" saw a marked decline in attendance.

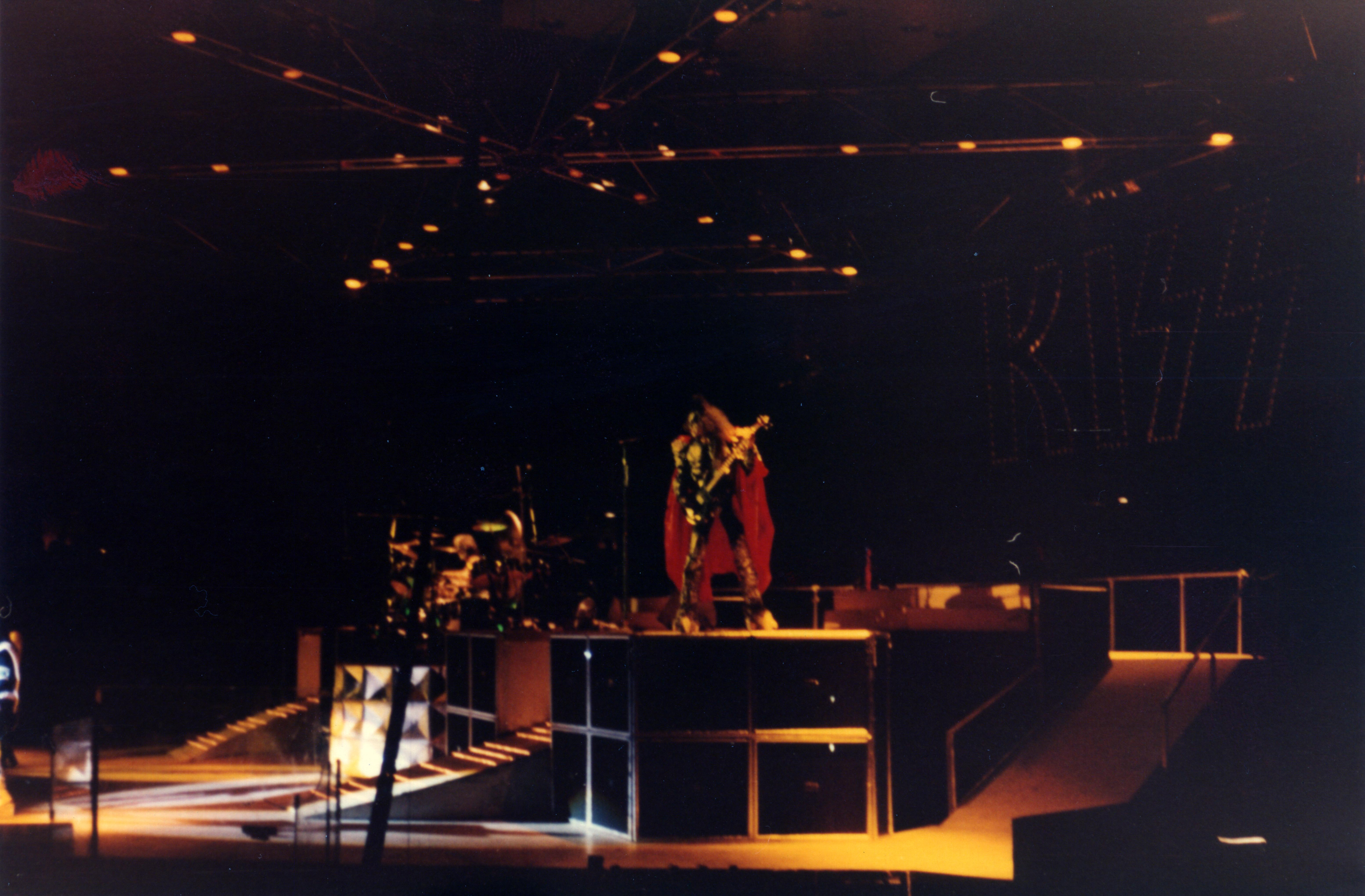
Simmons performing with Kiss in 1979

The crowds on this tour were much younger than previous audiences had been, with many preadolescent children in Kiss makeup with their mothers and fathers (who were sometimes wearing the makeup themselves) in tow at most concerts. Kiss themselves did little to dissuade this new fan base, donning colorful costumes that reinforced a cartoonish image for these younger fans.

The fans were unaware of the dissension within the band. One very public indication of the heightened friction within the group was an infamous October 31, 1979, interview on Tom Snyder's late-night The Tomorrow Show. During the episode, a visibly irritated Simmons and Stanley attempted, unsuccessfully, to contain the inebriated Frehley, whose frequent laughter and joking overshadowed the conversation between Snyder and the rest of the band. Criss made references to his large gun collection, to the chagrin of Simmons.

By the end of the Dynasty tour in December 1979, tensions between Criss and the rest of the band were at an all-time high. His drumming skills had noticeably eroded, and he even intentionally slowed down—or stopped playing altogether—during some concerts. The final show of the tour (December 16, 1979) was the last time Criss performed with the group for almost 17 years, although he remained an official member for nearly six more months.

While Criss appeared on the cover of the next album, Unmasked, Anton Fig was the actual drummer, although he was not credited. Showcasing a slick, contemporary pop sound, Unmasked (released May 20, 1980) had the dubious distinction of being the first non-Platinum Kiss album since Dressed to Kill. Soon after the album's release, Criss's departure was officially announced. Fig, considered a member of Kiss for one day following the departure of Criss, was then fired by Stanley and Simmons, who felt he was not a good fit for the band. He would ultimately join Paul Shaffer and the World's Most Dangerous Band, acting as the drummer for David Letterman's television programs until the host's retirement.

The band auditioned dozens of replacements for Criss in June 1980. One of the many who auditioned was Tico Torres (who would later join Bon Jovi). They finally settled on a little-known drummer-guitarist-pianist-keyboardist-singer from Brooklyn named Paul Charles Caravello, who adopted the stage name Eric Carr. His first makeup design was modeled on a hawk, but it was rejected when Stanley and Aucoin saw Carr in the bright yellow costume Kiss had designed for the new drummer. Carr created the "Fox" persona by the middle of July. In his Fox makeup, Carr debuted with the group on July 25, 1980, at the Palladium concert hall in New York City. This was Kiss's only U.S. show in support of Unmasked. On July 30, 1980, Kiss introduced Carr on ABC's Kids Are People Too!, which would air in September. The band's 1980 tour of Australia and New Zealand, on the other hand, was one of the biggest in its history, as they played to sold-out crowds and received overwhelmingly positive press coverage.

For its next album, the band worked again with producer Ezrin, with whom Kiss had found success on Destroyer. Early press reports indicated that the new album would be a return to the hard rock style that had originally brought the band success. However, 1981's Music from "The Elder" was a concept album featuring medieval horns, strings, harps, and synthesizers.

The album was presented as a soundtrack to a film that was never made, making it difficult to follow the storyline. To make matters worse, having received negative feedback following its record company's preview of the album, Kiss altered the record's track sequence in most countries to emphasize potential singles "The Oath" and "A World Without Heroes", which all but guaranteed the inability of listeners to understand the already-muddled storyline. Once released, fan reaction to The Elder was harsh; it failed to achieve Gold status and peaked at No. 75 on the Billboard album chart.

The band made only two appearances in support of the new album, both in January 1982. One was a performance on the ABC late-night variety program Fridays, while the second was a lip-synced performance that was broadcast via satellite during Italy's Sanremo Music Festival.

Absent from the satellite performance was Frehley, who had become increasingly frustrated with Kiss's new musical direction. Upset with the band's decision to record Music from "The Elder", he did not actively participate in the album's creation (despite recording solos on it), providing lead vocals for only one track, "Dark Light". He did not appear at a special concert at Studio 54 in New York City, leaving Kiss to perform as a trio. He recorded his guitar parts at his home studio in Wilton, Connecticut, and mailed them to Ezrin. Another source of frustration for Frehley was that with the departure of Criss, and with Carr not being an equal partner in the band, he was often outvoted 2-to-1 on group decisions. In June 1982, Frehley's departure from the band was negotiated, although he did not officially leave until December.

Simmons stated in his autobiography Kiss and Make-Up that Van Halen founder Eddie Van Halen was eager to replace Frehley as Kiss's lead guitarist. Simmons and Eddie's brother Alex convinced Eddie to remain with Van Halen. Eddie was willing to break up Van Halen due to tensions between himself and lead vocalist David Lee Roth, who ultimately left the band in 1985. Paul Stanley, however, has since denied the rumors of Eddie Van Halen wanting to join Kiss. Other notable guitarists who auditioned to replace Frehley included Punky Meadows of Angel, the then-teenaged Doug Aldrich (later of Whitesnake), Richie Sambora (shortly before he joined Bon Jovi), Slash (prior to the latter being recruited by Guns N' Roses), and a then-unknown Yngwie Malmsteen.

Soon afterward, Kiss made major changes to its business dealings – chief among them was severing ties with its manager of nine years, Bill Aucoin, and cutting back on its unwieldy organizational tree. Although Frehley had already decided to leave the band, he was pictured on the covers of 1982's Killers and Creatures of the Night, although he did not participate in the recording of either album.

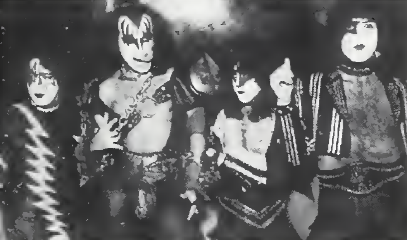
Kiss in 1982. L–R: Ace Frehley, Gene Simmons, Eric Carr, Paul Stanley

Creatures of the Night was Kiss's heaviest album to date, and although it fared better than Music from "The Elder", it peaked at only No. 45 on the charts and was not certified Gold until 1994. In Frehley's absence, Kiss utilized a number of guitarists for the recording of the album, especially Vinnie Vincent, who played on six tracks.

Frehley's last appearance with the band (until the 1996 reunion) was in the music video for the single "I Love It Loud", which was co-written by Vincent. Frehley also appeared on the cover of the original Creatures of the Night album artwork. When the album was remixed and re-released in 1985 with a non-makeup cover and a slightly different song order, to reflect the band's roster change and abandonment of its makeup and costumes, Vincent was again absent from the album cover, as then-current lead guitarist, Bruce Kulick, appeared instead. The liner notes accompanying the remixed LP, however, credited both Frehley and Vincent with lead guitar performances on the Creatures of the Night album. Vincent officially replaced Frehley as lead guitarist in December 1982, as the band embarked on its 10th Anniversary Tour.

Vincent originally wanted to use his birth name (Cusano) in the band, but this was vetoed by Simmons on the grounds that it sounded "too ethnic". Specifically, according to Simmons, "it sounded like a fruit vendor". Simmons went on to note that "fairly or unfairly, rock and roll is about the image". Vincent then suggested the name "Mick Fury", but this was also disallowed. Simmons later suggested the name change to "Vinnie Vincent". Vincent started actively pushing to join Kiss as a full member. Despite the misgivings that both Simmons and Stanley harbored about his personality, Vincent was taken into the band. Stanley designed a character, "the Wiz" also known as "the Egyptian Warrior", and makeup centered around an Egyptian ankh, for Vincent. According to the official authorized Kiss biography, written by David Leaf and Ken Sharp, "the Egyptian Ankh Warrior" refers to Vincent's makeup and persona, while the nickname "the Wiz" refers to his virtuosity as a guitar player. According to the Simmons autobiography Kiss and Make-Up, Vincent's Kiss persona was solely "the Wiz". A persona as "the Ankh Warrior" or similar is not mentioned in the book at all.

From 1982 to 1983, the new lineup of Kiss became Simmons (the Demon), Stanley (the Starchild), Eric Carr (the Fox) and Vincent (the Wiz).

Vincent's personality did not mesh well with either Stanley or Simmons, and he was dismissed from Kiss at the end of the Creatures tour. He was quickly reinstated before recording started for Lick It Up because Simmons and Stanley could not find a new lead guitarist on such short notice. Vincent appeared on the cover of Lick It Up and was credited as the lead guitarist. He received a writing credit for eight of the ten songs on the album.

Personality issues arose once again, and Vincent was fired following the Lick It Up tour, due in part to excessive guitar soloing at a 1984 concert in Quebec. He was replaced by Mark St. John. Vincent was later utilized by Kiss as a songwriter on the 1992 album Revenge, contributing to the songs "Unholy", "Heart of Chrome" and "I Just Wanna". Vincent and the band parted ways. Persistent rumors circulated for years among Kiss fans regarding the true reason for Vincent's dismissals from Kiss, with at least one band member refusing to comment except to say that legally it was not up for discussion. Simmons stated in an interview several years later that Vincent's firing was for "unethical behavior", but he did not elaborate:

Vinnie, for the record, was fired for unethical behavior, not because of lack of talent.

=== 1983–1996: unmasking ===
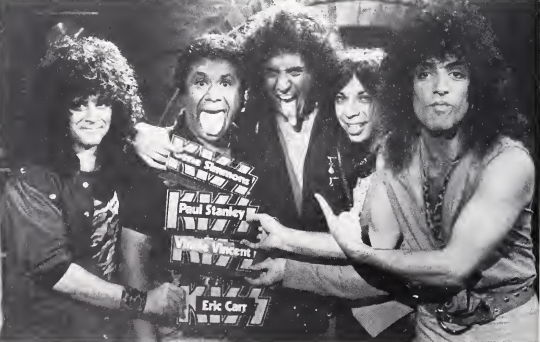
Kiss on MTV in 1983, appearing in public unmasked for the first time. L–R: Eric Carr, J. J. Jackson, Gene Simmons, Vinnie Vincent, Paul Stanley

Sensing it was time for a change, Kiss made the decision to abandon their trademark makeup and costumes. The band officially appeared in public without makeup for the first time since their very early days on a September 18, 1983, appearance on MTV, which coincided with the release of Lick It Up. The tour to promote the new album and the unmasked band members began in Lisbon, Portugal, on October 11, 1983, at Pavilhão Dramático de Cascais, the band's first concert without makeup since early 1973. Lick It Up became Kiss's first Gold record in three years, but the tour was even more sparsely attended than the previous one. Vincent did not get along with Simmons and Stanley, and he left the band at the conclusion of the tour in March 1984. Vincent's replacement was Mark St. John, a session player and guitar tutor.

With St. John, Kiss released the album Animalize on September 13, 1984.Animalize followed the success of Lick It Up, and due in part to consistent MTV play for the "Heaven's on Fire" video, Animalize was the band's bestselling record in America during the decade, with over two million albums sold. With the success of the album and subsequent tour, Kiss had recaptured some of its earlier glory (though not to the level of its 1970s heyday). St. John, however, came down with reactive arthritis during tour rehearsals, and performed at a handful of shows before being dismissed from the band in December 1984, with one of these shows being at the Mid-Hudson Civic Center in Poughkeepsie, New York which was recorded on November 28, 1984. The band hired Bruce Kulick, the brother of Balance's Bob Kulick, in 1985 to replace St. John. Kulick had previously filled in for St. John during the first two months of the Animalize tour. Kulick was Kiss's fourth lead guitarist in less than three years, but he stayed with the band for 12 years. Kulick became one of the band's longest-serving members, with the longest continuous tenure of anyone other than Simmons and Stanley, until Tommy Thayer and Eric Singer broke his record in 2014 and 2016 respectively.

You can't help but have a good time at one of our shows when everybody is going nuts onstage. That kind of good time is infectious. You can't fake it. You can't fool the audience. The people will see right through you if you put on a fake smile or you're not putting out your best. The band are alive and well and playing better than we ever have.

— Gene Simmons

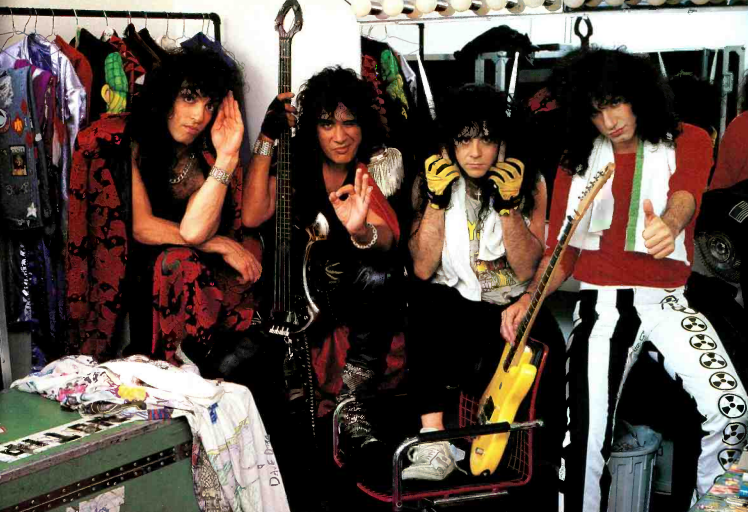
Kiss in 1988. L–R: Paul Stanley, Gene Simmons, Eric Carr, Bruce Kulick

One of the first concerts Kulick played as an official member of the band was at Detroit, Michigan's Cobo Hall. It was held the night after he signed the contract to be the band's guitarist and was filmed for the MTV special Animalize Live.

The lineup of Stanley, Simmons, Carr and Kulick turned out to be the most stable since the original, and for the rest of the 1980s, Kiss released a series of Platinum albums: 1985's Asylum, 1987's Crazy Nights and the 1988 greatest hits compilation Smashes, Thrashes & Hits. Crazy Nights, in particular, was one of Kiss's most successful albums overseas. The single "Crazy Crazy Nights" reached No. 4 on the singles chart in the United Kingdom, the band's highest-charting single in that country.

Kiss ended the decade with the October 1989 release Hot in the Shade. Although the album failed to achieve Platinum status, it spawned the hit ballad "Forever", co-written by Michael Bolton. Peaking at No. 8 in the US, it was the group's highest-charting single since "Beth" and was the band's second Top 10 single.

During this time, Kiss struggled with its identity and fan base. Simmons, arguably the driving force in Kiss during the 1970s, became less involved with the group in the 1980s as he pursued outside interests, most notably a film career. Stanley took a more prominent role as a result.

In February 1991, the band decided to once again enlist Ezrin to produce its next album. Before recording could begin in earnest, however, a tumor was discovered on Carr's heart in March 1991. It was successfully removed the following month, but more tumors were soon discovered in his lungs. Carr received chemotherapy and was pronounced cancer-free in July. In September, he suffered the first of two cerebral hemorrhages. He died on November 24, 1991, at the age of 41.

Kiss continued, introducing veteran drummer Eric Singer. Singer had played with Paul Stanley previously, as part of Stanley's backing band during a 1989 solo tour.

Kiss released Revenge on May 19, 1992. It featured a leaner, harder-edged sound, as indicated by the first single, "Unholy". In a surprise move, Kiss enlisted Vincent to help with songwriting duties. The album debuted in the Top 10 and went Gold. Kiss embarked on a brief club tour of the U.S. in the spring of 1992, before beginning an American tour in September 1992. The tour was documented on the album Alive III, released on May 14, 1993. Four days later, Kiss were inducted into Hollywood's RockWalk.

In 1995, the group released the book Kisstory, a 440-page, 9 pounds (4.1 kg), detailed chronicle of the group's history to that point. That same year, the band embarked on a unique and well-received Worldwide Kiss Convention Tour. The conventions were all-day events, featuring displays of vintage Kiss stage outfits, instruments and memorabilia; performances by Kiss cover bands; and dealers selling Kiss merchandise from every stage of the band's career. Kiss appeared live at the conventions, conducted question and answer sessions, signed autographs, and performed a two-hour acoustic set composed mostly of spontaneous fan requests. On the first U.S. date (June 17, 1995), Criss appeared onstage with Kiss to sing "Hard Luck Woman" and "Nothin' to Lose". It was the first time Criss had performed publicly with the band in nearly 16 years.

=== 1996–2001: original lineup reunion tour and remasking ===
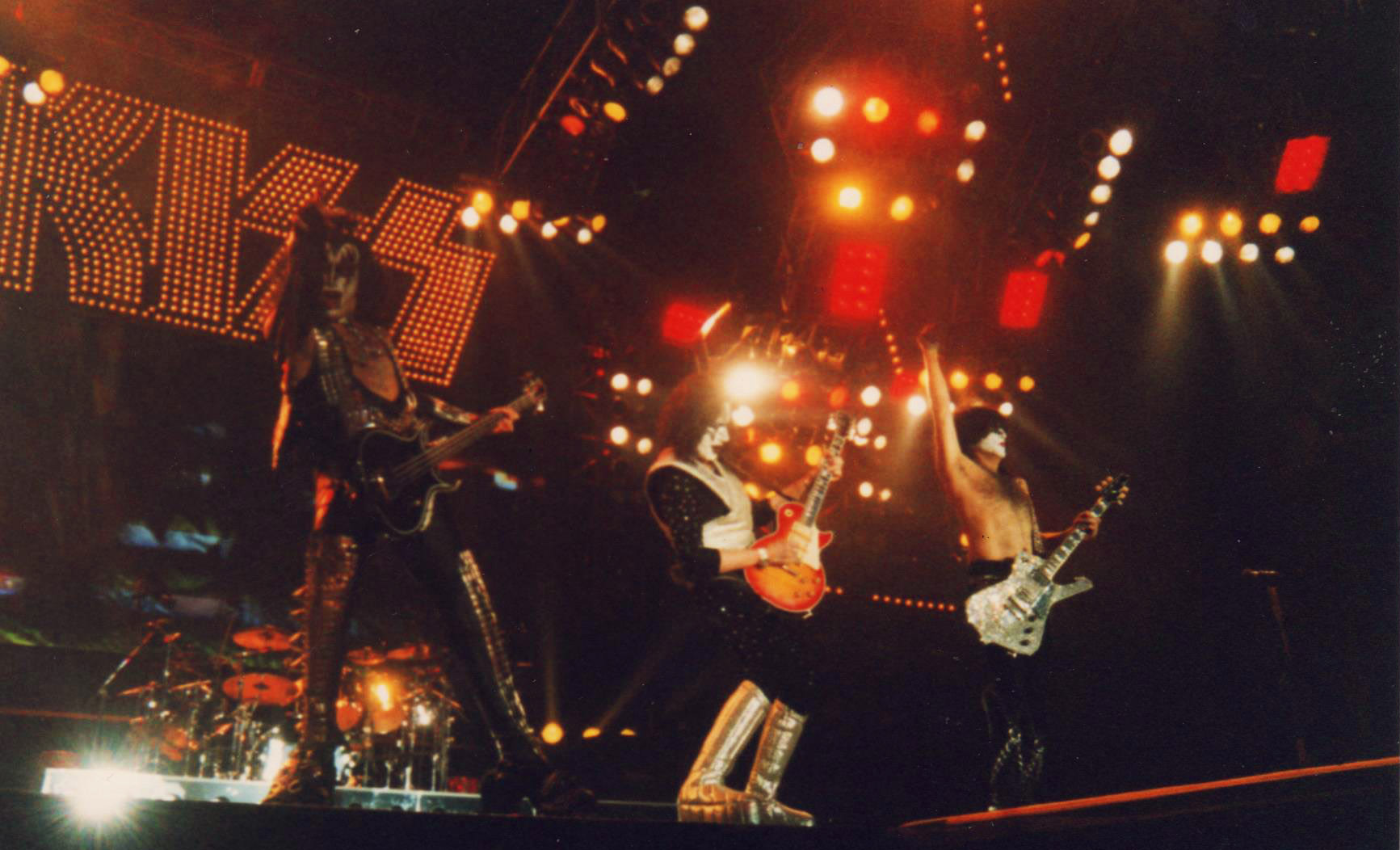
Kiss original lineup performing in Utrecht in 1997

On August 9, 1995, Kiss joined the long line of musicians to perform on MTV Unplugged. The band contacted Criss and Frehley and invited them to participate in the event. Both joined Kiss on stage for several songs at the end of the set: "Beth", "2000 Man", "Nothin' to Lose" and "Rock and Roll All Nite". The Unplugged appearance set off months of speculation that a possible reunion of the original Kiss lineup was in the works. In the weeks following the Unplugged concert, however, the band (with Kulick and Singer) returned to the studio for the first time in three years to record a follow-up to Revenge. Carnival of Souls: The Final Sessions was completed in February 1996, but its release was delayed for almost two years. Bootleg copies of the album circulated widely among fans. While Kiss continued to exist publicly as Simmons, Stanley, Kulick and Singer, arrangements for a reunion of the original lineup were in the works. These efforts culminated with a public event as dramatic as any the band had staged since its 1983 unmasking on MTV. With the following statements, Tupac Shakur introduced the original Kiss lineup, in full makeup and Love Gun-era stage outfits, to a rousing ovation at the 38th Annual Grammy Awards:

You know how the Grammys used to be, all straight-looking folks with suits. Everybody looking tired. No surprises. We tired of that. We need something different, something new, we need to shock the people ... so let's shock the people!

On April 16, 1996, the band members held a press conference aboard the USS Intrepid in New York City, where they announced their plans for a full-fledged reunion tour, with the help of new manager Doc McGhee. The conference, MC'd by Conan O'Brien, was simulcast to 58 countries. On April 20, nearly 40,000 tickets for the tour's first show sold out in 47 minutes.

The first public concert featuring the newly reunited Kiss was an hour-long warm-up show on June 15 for the annual KROQ Weenie Roast in Irvine, California, during which the band nearly ignited the stage of the Irvine Meadows Amphitheatre. On June 28, the Kiss Alive/Worldwide Tour began at Tiger Stadium in Detroit in front of a sold-out crowd of 39,867 fans. The tour lasted for 192 shows over the course of one year and earned $43.6 million, making Kiss the top-drawing concert act of 1996. The average attendance of 13,737 is the highest in the group's history.

There were many many nights when I was looking around the stage and going "This is magic." This is beyond anybody's wildest fantasies. What was important about these shows is we had a much bigger task than people understood. Our biggest competition was our history. We didn't have to be as good as we used to be. We had to be as good as people thought we were. The show wasn't to be a replica of what we've done, it was to be what people imagined we had done. We had to be totally committed, and also totally sure that we could not only live up the legend but also surpass it. In terms of the stage show for the reunion tour, what we wanted to do was look at the '77 show in a sense as a pinnacle. That is what we chose to build on but not copy. There are also elements from other shows too in the sense that there's bombs and the flying rig and the breaking of the guitars. At that time, it was the ultimate Kiss show in the sense that we looked at the show, which we thought was our best and said, "Top this."

— Paul Stanley

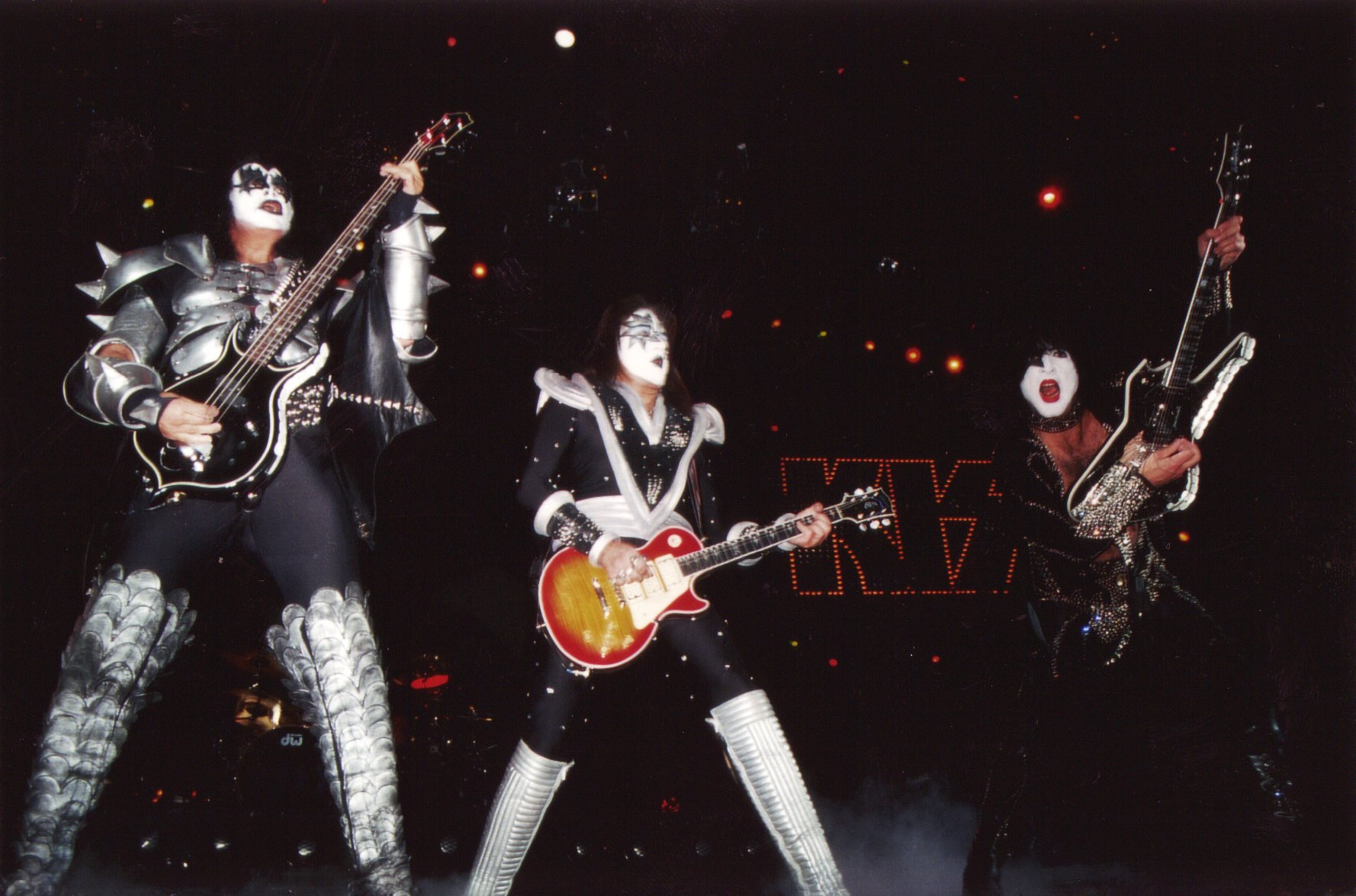
Kiss performing in Paris on March 21, 1999

In September 1998, the reunited group issued Psycho Circus. Although it was the first album with the original lineup since 1979's Dynasty, the contributions of Frehley and Criss were minimal. While the images of Frehley and Criss are featured prominently on the album, most of the lead guitar work was later revealed to have been performed by future band member Tommy Thayer. Former member Kulick made an appearance on the intro of the song "Within". Most drum duties were handled by session musician Kevin Valentine. Despite the controversy, the album achieved a No. 3 chart debut, the highest position for a Kiss album until Sonic Boom debuted at No. 2 in 2009. The title track received a Grammy nomination for Best Hard Rock Performance. The Psycho Circus Tour opened at Dodger Stadium in Los Angeles on Halloween in 1998, and was simulcast on FM radio across the U.S. It proved to be another success, and was historic for being the first to ever incorporate 3D visuals into a stage show.

On August 11, 1999, Kiss was inducted into the Hollywood Walk of Fame, in the "Recording Industry" category. The next month, the group worked in collaboration with World Championship Wrestling to produce a Kiss-themed wrestler known as the Demon, whose face was painted to resemble Simmons's makeup. The group performed "God of Thunder" live on WCW Monday Nitro to debut the character. The band received $500,000 for the one-night, one-song performance.

Kiss launched a U.S. Farewell Tour in March 2000. The group quickly added dates to the tour, which ran through April 2001.

The Reunion tour made us the number one band again. We played to about two million people in one year. Then we did the Psycho Circus tour and after that we thought, "been there, done it." We're the champs again, let's retire on top and we felt there is nothing worse than having someone go away and you don't get to say goodbye so this tour really is for the fans and to celebrate the whole history of the band.

— Paul Stanley

=== 2001–2008: post-reunion ===
On the eve of the Japanese and Australian leg of the Farewell Tour on January 31, 2001, Criss suddenly left the band once again, because he and the band could not come to agreement with his contract salary. Taking his place was previous Kiss drummer Singer who assumed Criss's Cat persona as the Farewell Tour continued.

With the band supposedly set to retire by early 2001, a career-encompassing collection entitled simply The Box Set, consisting of 94 tracks on five CDs, was released in November of that year, while the summer saw perhaps the most outrageous item of Kiss merchandise yet – the Kiss Kasket. In introducing the Kiss Kasket, Simmons quipped, "I love livin', but this makes the alternative look pretty damn good."

On December 4, 2001, Kiss was one of the honorees at the National Academy of Recording Arts and Sciences ("The Recording Academy") Heroes Award ceremony, at the NARAS New York Chapter. NARAS has 12 chapters throughout the United States, hence 12 ceremonies throughout the year, with the honorees each being honored by the chapter closest to their residence. By receiving this honor, which NARAS has renamed the "Recording Academy Honors", Kiss effectively received NARAS's second-highest career honor, right behind the Lifetime Achievement Grammy Award.

Kiss was relatively quiet through the rest of the year, but 2002 started with some controversy as Simmons took part in a controversial interview on National Public Radio with host Terry Gross. In February 2002, Kiss (with Singer on drums and Frehley on lead guitar) performed during the closing ceremony of the 2002 Winter Olympics in Salt Lake City, Utah which was Frehley's final performance as a member of Kiss.

On March 6, 2002, Kiss performed a private concert at a resort in Trelawny, Jamaica. Frehley, who was no longer under contract, did not perform with the group. He was replaced by Thayer, who donned Frehley's Spaceman makeup and costume for his first live appearance with Kiss. That month, the band (with Thayer) taped an appearance on the American sitcom That '70s Show. The episode, "That '70s Kiss Show", aired in August 2002. Thayer again performed with the group in April 2002, when Kiss performed "Detroit Rock City" (with pre-recorded music and live vocals) for an appearance on Dick Clark's American Bandstand 50th Anniversary show, which aired on May 3.

In February 2003, Kiss traveled to Australia and recorded Kiss Symphony: Alive IV with the Melbourne Symphony Orchestra at Marvel Stadium (then known as Telstra Dome) in Melbourne. Thayer once again replaced Frehley, while Criss returned to the group, as one of the conditions set forth by promoters required the band's lineup to include at least three original members.

Despite claims made prior to the Farewell Tour that it would be the group's last, Kiss toured with Aerosmith in 2003. Frehley announced that his departure from the band was permanent, stating that he believed the Farewell Tour would be Kiss's last, and declined Simmons's invitation to join the band on the Aerosmith tour. He was permanently replaced by Thayer, as Kiss moved into a post-reunion phase that saw the band easing into a new lineup, permanently featuring Thayer as "Spaceman" and Singer as "the Catman". On this tour, still featuring Criss, the group introduced the "Platinum" tickets package, with the most expensive packages costing $1,000. This package included a seat in the first five rows, a meet-and-greet with Kiss after their performance and a photograph with the band. The tour earned more than $64 million in 2003, which ranked seventh for the year.

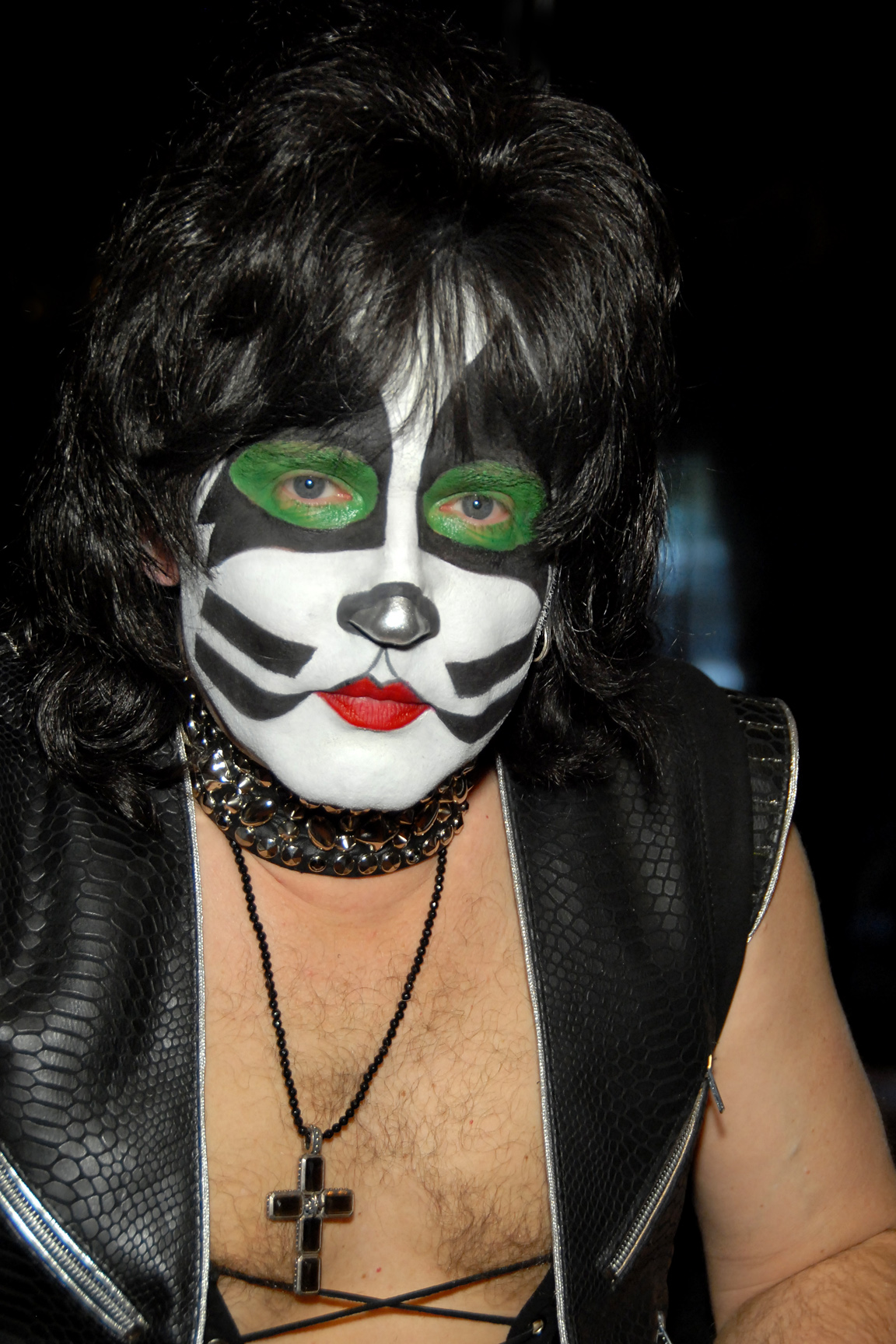
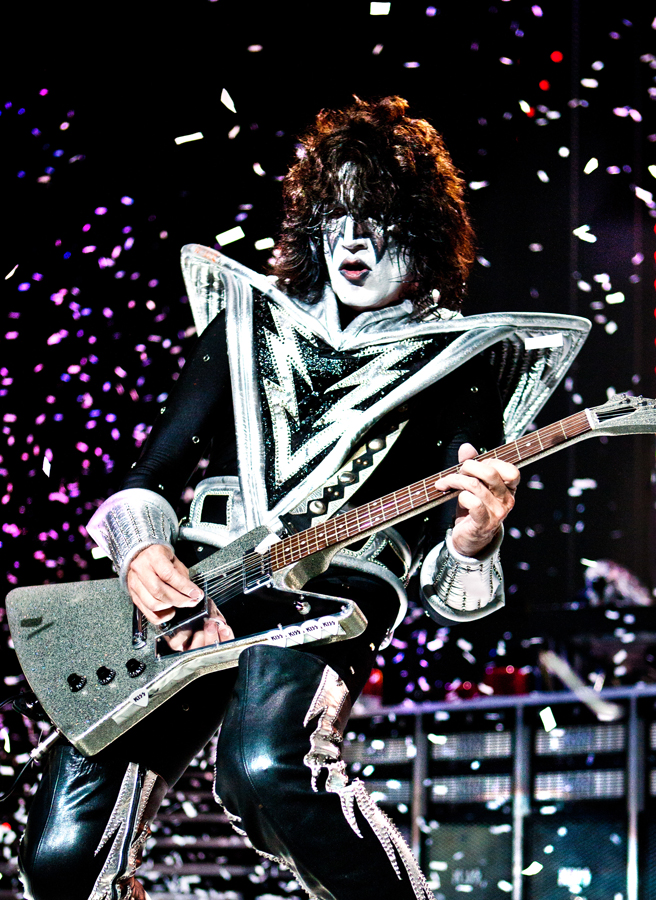
Eric Singer and Tommy Thayer replaced Peter Criss and Ace Frehley as "the Catman" and "the Spaceman", respectively, for the last 20 years of Kiss's existence.

Simmons and Stanley did not renew Criss's contract when it expired in March 2004. Criss, on his website, stated that "No one, again, no one has called me, or my attorney about an extension for future touring. As a founding member I find this to be disrespectful to me, and to the fans that have made us one of the biggest bands in the world." Eric Singer once again replaced Criss.

In mid-2004, Kiss headlined the Rock the Nation 2004 World Tour, with Poison as the opening act. The tour ended in August with a sold-out show in Mexico City. Selected dates on the tour were filmed for the Rock the Nation Live! concert DVD, released on December 13, 2005. Stanley, who had been experiencing increasing difficulty with his hip, had his mobility limited during the tour. He has already had two hip surgeries performed, with more likely in the future.

After the conclusion of the Rock the Nation Tour, Kiss performed only sporadically for a number of years. The group played two shows in 2005, and another six in 2006. Four of the 2006 shows were July concerts in Japan, including two dates (July 22 and 23) as a headlining act at the 2006 Udo Music Festival. Kiss performed four July 2007 concerts, three of which were dubbed the Hit 'N Run Tour. Prior to the final show on July 27, Stanley was hospitalized with an extremely rapid heartbeat. In his absence, Kiss performed in concert as a trio for the first time since 1982. This was the first Kiss concert that Stanley had missed during his then 34-year tenure with the group.

Kiss (along with Queen, Def Leppard and Judas Priest) were honored at the inaugural "VH1 Rock Honors" event, held May 25, 2006, in Las Vegas. In June 2006, Simmons and Stanley attended the opening of the Kiss Coffeehouse in Myrtle Beach, South Carolina. On October 15, 2006, Simmons, Stanley and Criss were inaugural inductees into the Long Island Music Hall of Fame, along with performers such as Neil Diamond, Billy Joel, Louis Armstrong, the Ramones and Tony Bennett.

Stanley released his second solo album, Live to Win, on October 24, 2006, and undertook a brief solo tour in support. On October 31 the same year, the group released Kissology Volume One: 1974–1977, the first of 10 possible DVD sets featuring complete concert footage, interviews and never-before-seen clips. By January 2007, the set had been certified 5× Platinum in the United States. A second volume was released on August 14, 2007. It was certified 6× Platinum by the RIAA on October 24. What seemed to be the final entry, Kissology Volume Three: 1992–2000, was released on December 18, 2007, and has been certified 8× Platinum by the R.I.A.A.

In April 2007, former guitarist St. John died from an apparent cerebral hemorrhage at age 51. After being forced to leave Kiss in 1984, St. John formed the short-lived glam metal group White Tiger.

Though Kiss had been eligible for enshrinement in the Rock and Roll Hall of Fame since 1999, they were not nominated until 2009 and were not inducted until 2014. While this snub displeased some fans, Stanley and Simmons maintained that it was meaningless to them. Nevertheless, a group of about 200 Kiss fans held a protest rally in front of the Hall of Fame in Cleveland on August 5, 2006. It was the first known organized demonstration seeking the induction of a band into the Hall.

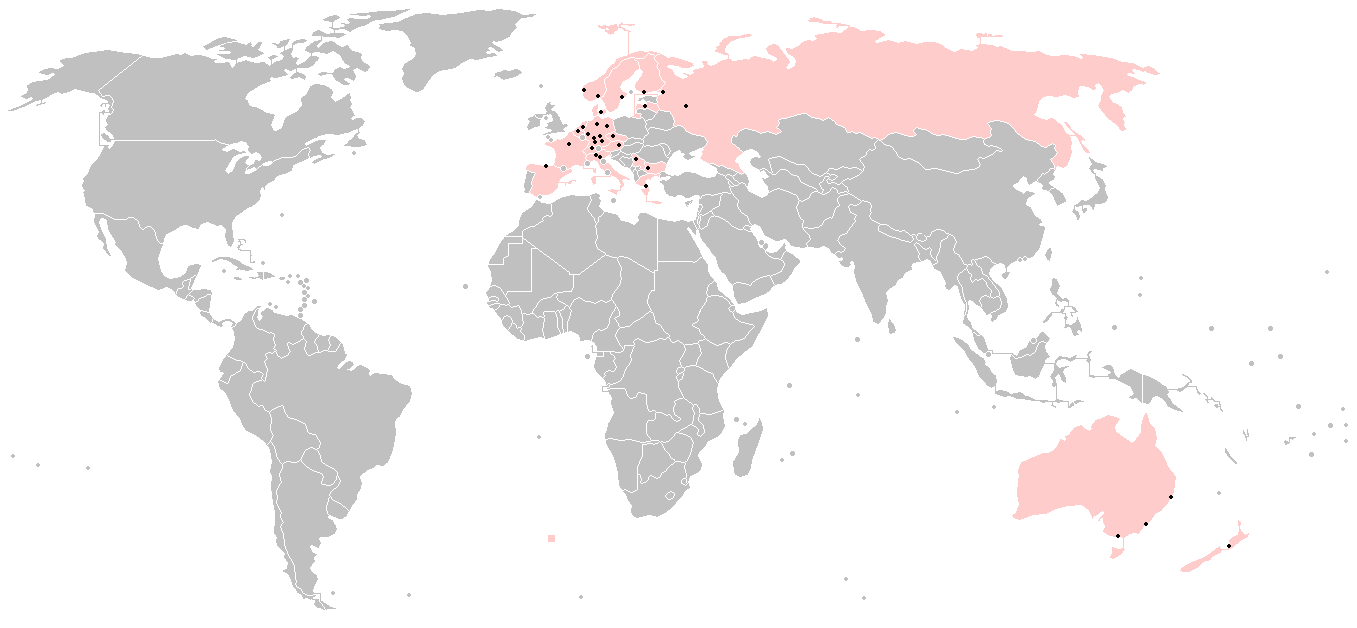
Alive 35 World Tour map

In 2007, a new comic book series featuring the band was released by the Kiss Comics Group in association with Platinum Studios, titled Kiss 4K: Legends Never Die.

The band picked up their pace in 2008, embarking on their first proper tour of Europe in nearly a decade. On January 30, 2008, Stanley confirmed that Kiss would launch the Kiss Alive/35 World Tour, playing arena and stadium shows in Europe, Australia and New Zealand. On March 16, 2008, Kiss closed the Australian Grand Prix at Melbourne Grand Prix Circuit as well as performing in Brisbane and Sydney as part of this tour. Kiss played at the Rock2Wgtn two-day festival held in Wellington, New Zealand, on March 22 and 23, 2008; the festival also featured Ozzy Osbourne, Whitesnake, Poison, Alice Cooper, Lordi, Sonic Altar and Symphony of Screams, with special effects provided by WETA Workshop (of The Lord of the Rings and King Kong fame).

Throughout the summer of 2008, Kiss headlined festivals as well as their own shows and played to a record audience of about 400,000 people. As part of this tour, Kiss headlined the Download Festival at England's Donington Park on June 13. Three days later, they headlined the Arrow Rock Festival in Nijmegen, Netherlands. On June 28, Kiss headlined the Graspop Metal Meeting in Dessel, Belgium. It was the last show of the European leg of the Kiss Alive/35 Tour. On August 4, Kiss played at Rockin' the Rally at the Sturgis Motorcycle Rally as part of the tour. South Dakota Governor Mike Rounds proclaimed August 4, 2008, to be "Kiss Rock and Roll Day" in South Dakota. In September 2008, both Simmons and Stanley confirmed rumors that the Kiss Alive/35 Tour would continue with extensive tours of North America in the beginning of 2009, as well as South America. The latter tour included shows on April 5 in Argentina, April 7 and 8 in Brazil, April 11 in Colombia, April 14 in Peru, and other concerts in Venezuela and Chile. That summer, Kiss came back to North America to continue the Alive/35 World Tour, starting on July 18 in Halifax, Nova Scotia.

=== 2008–2012: Sonic Boom and Monster ===
More than 10 years after their last studio album, and following years of denials about ever wanting to do a new album, Stanley and Simmons changed their minds. In November 2008, Stanley stated to rock photographer Ross Halfin that a new Kiss album was in the works. Stanley himself would be the producer, and the album would have a "real 70s Kiss sound" to it. Later that month, Simmons and Stanley both publicly confirmed the information about a new Kiss album:

We have 4 tunes recorded. If you're a fan of our stuff from about 1977, you'll feel right at home. All of us have taken up the songwriting call to arms in the same spirit we once did – without a care in the world and without outside writers. Nothing to prove to anyone. Just doing what comes naturally. Ignoring fashions, trends and with a personal vow from all of us: no rapping. There are plenty of people out there doing this and they don't need four palefaced guys pretending they're from the hood. Besides, I'm not sure how to correctly pronounce 'wassup.' See you all there ... Or maybe later!

The band appeared on American Idol in May 2009, performing "Detroit Rock City" and "Rock and Roll All Nite" with Adam Lambert.

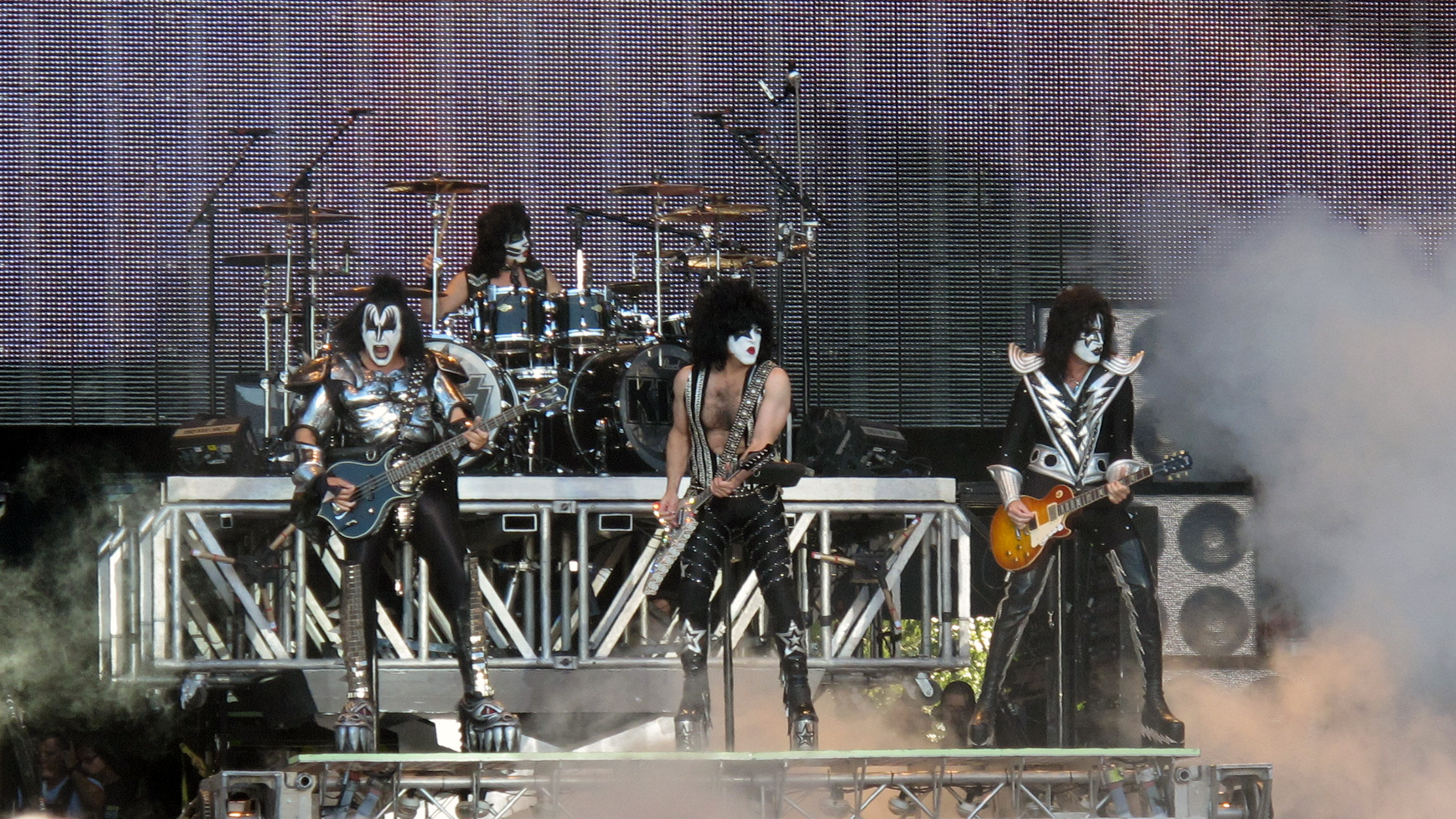
Kiss performing at the 2010 Sauna Open Air Metal Festival in Tampere, Finland

In October 2009, a new studio album, titled Sonic Boom, was released. It included a CD of new material, re-recorded versions of famous Kiss hits (previously released as Jigoku-Retsuden, a Japanese exclusive album in 2008) and a live DVD recorded in Buenos Aires, Argentina. "Modern Day Delilah" was released as the lead single from Sonic Boom on August 19, 2009. The song was Kiss's first single release in 11 years, since 1998's "You Wanted the Best". The song gained positive feedback from both critics and fans, and was compared to the band's 1970s work. In support of the new album, Kiss appeared live on Late Show with David Letterman on October 6, 2009, and on Jimmy Kimmel Live! on October 7, 2009. Sonic Boom debuted at No. 2 on the Billboard 200.

On September 25, 2009, the Kiss Alive/35 North American Tour kicked off at Cobo Hall in Detroit; both nights were filmed for future DVD release. These were the band's final performances there, as the venue was later closed as part of the renovation of the Cobo Center. Kiss headlined the 2009 Voodoo Experience held at City Park in New Orleans, Louisiana, on Halloween night. During their performance at the MTS Centre on November 9, 2009, in Winnipeg, Manitoba, one of the lighting trusses caught on fire from a pyro cue. The truss had to be lowered in order to have the fire put out. During the five or so minutes it took to extinguish the fire, the band broke into the song "Firehouse". No one was hurt and the show continued.

Kiss started the European leg of the Sonic Boom over Europe Tour in May 2010. Tragedy struck Kiss for a third time when former manager Aucoin died of cancer on June 28, 2010, at the age of 66. Stanley and Simmons said he was like the fifth member of Kiss. The tour included their first UK arena shows in 11 years and their first visit to Slovakia. Kiss later played at two dates in US cities Cheyenne, Wyoming and the North Dakota State Fair in Minot, North Dakota, in July 2010. They also played at the Indiana State Fair in August and the Minnesota State Fair in September. They also made a brief appearance at the Saratoga Performing Arts Center in Saratoga Springs, New York, on August 17, 2010. On July 23, Kiss started The Hottest Show on Earth Tour in the United States.

On April 13, 2011, Kiss began recording a new album due for release later in the year. Simmons stated, the album "is gonna be the next step to Sonic Boom. Very similar – straight rock songs, no ballads, no keyboards, no nothing, just rock." The band also used old analog equipment instead of more popular digital recording gear. Simmons said: "Technology is a seductive bitch, she will seduce you. You press this button, you don't have to do anything. But analog is the love of your life. You can push real hard and it always gives back. For the new album, the actual recording process was 24-track tape and an old Trident board. And as many tubes as possible. You need tubes, electricity and thick wood to make that thick sound."

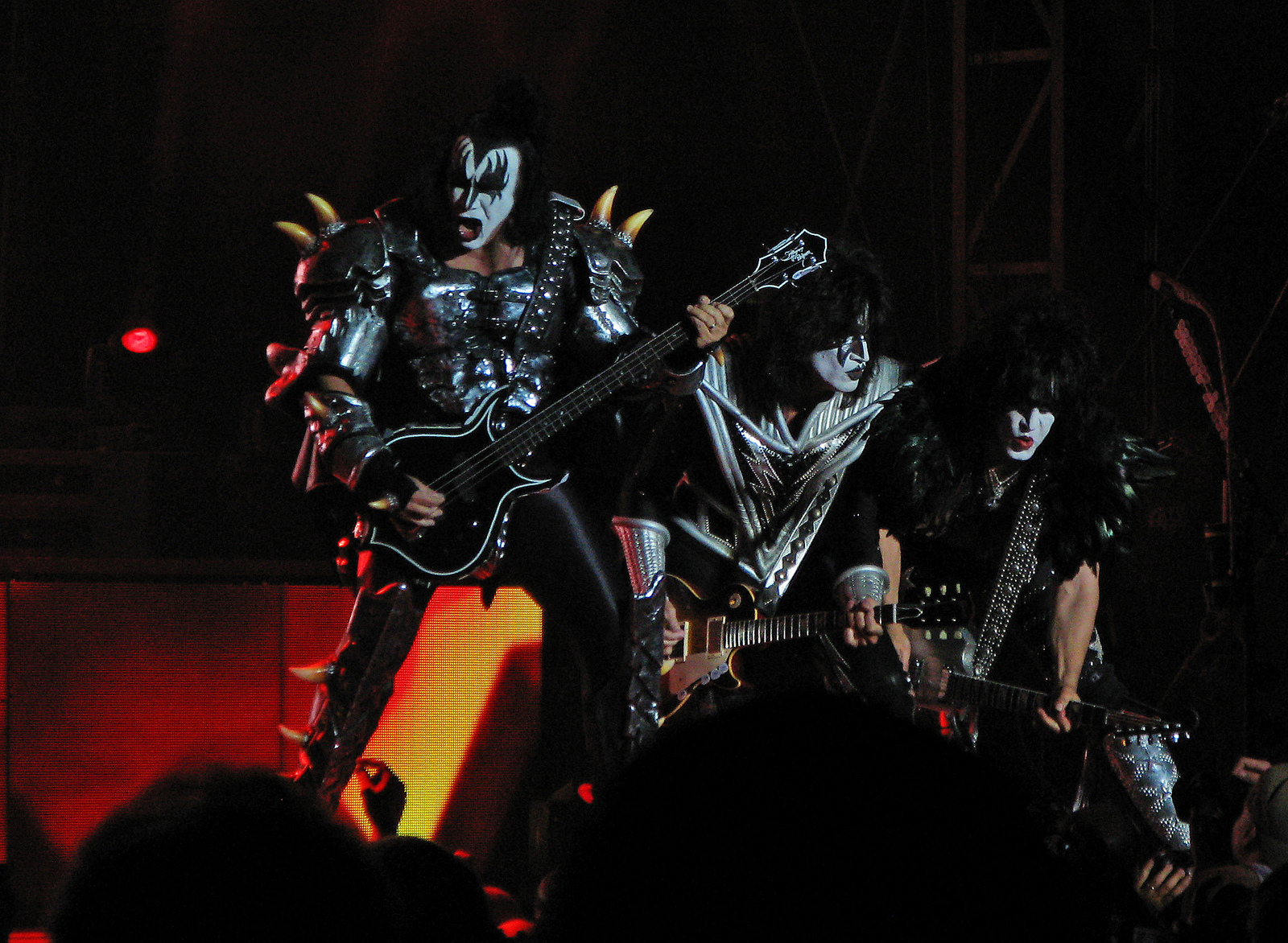
Kiss performing in Saint Paul, Minnesota, on August 29, 2012

Kiss spent the summer of 2011 playing venues in the US and Canada, visiting cities they had not played in some time; it was dubbed the "Lost Cities Tour". Their next album Monster was released in October 2012. Kiss by Monster Mini Golf was opened in March 2012 in Las Vegas. The facility is an 18-hole indoor miniature golf course, featuring arcade games, a gift shop, and numerous pieces of band memorabilia on display. The complete current version of the band attended the grand opening.

Kiss appeared on Jimmy Kimmel Live! on March 20, 2012. A press conference was held on the same day to announce a summer North American tour called The Tour, co-headlined by Mötley Crüe. The Tour started on July 20 and ended on October 1. The single "Hell or Hallelujah" was released internationally on July 2, 2012, and on July 3 in North America. Monster was released on October 9, 2012, in North America.

Kiss kicked off the Monster World Tour on November 7, 2012, in Buenos Aires, Argentina at the River Plate Stadium and continued the six-date South American leg with dates in Santiago, Asunción, Porto Alegre, São Paulo and Rio de Janeiro until November 18. The Australian leg began on February 28, 2013, in Perth at the Perth Arena and ran through March 16 in Mackay at Virgin Australian Stadium. They were joined by Mötley Crüe, Thin Lizzy and Diva Demolition. The band extensively toured Europe and Canada with a few US dates in June through August, and then Japan in October.

=== 2013–2015: 40th anniversary, Rock and Roll Hall of Fame and international collaboration ===
On October 16, 2013, Kiss was again announced as a nominee for the Rock and Roll Hall of Fame, and was subsequently announced as an inductee on December 17.

In 2013, Kiss purchased a share of an Arena Football League expansion franchise set to begin play at the Honda Center in Anaheim, California, in 2014. Simmons, Stanley and manager McGhee jointly owned the team, called the Los Angeles Kiss. Both Simmons and Stanley are known fans of the AFL. The LA Kiss offered National Football League free agent quarterback Tim Tebow a contract to join their team and play in the AFL, but he did not join. The team folded in 2016. Bizarrely, Simmons was also an "owner for a day" of the Carlton Football Club, a team that participates in the Australian Football League and which is also commonly abbreviated to AFL, although this purchase was unofficial and purportedly done for tax purposes, according to Simmons. Simmons has nevertheless been a fan of Carlton and Australian rules football since at least 2008.

In 2014, Kiss toured as co-headliners with Def Leppard. After Simmons toured with Joe Elliott in South America, the two talked about their bands working together. From June 23 to August 31, 2014, the bands toured 42 cities, with a dollar per ticket donated to such military charities as Wounded Warrior Project.

For the first time in the band's 41-year history, Kiss was featured on the cover of the April 10, 2014 (Issue 1206) edition of Rolling Stone magazine. On April 10, 2014, Kiss was inducted into the Rock and Roll Hall of Fame. Though the rockers did not perform, the original four members showed up at the 29th annual induction ceremony in Brooklyn to accept the honor. Former guitarist Bruce Kulick revealed that he, Singer, and Thayer were also present at the Hall of Fame induction; the three were invited by Stanley and Simmons even though the Hall of Fame chose to induct only the four founding members. Kulick also claimed that Simmons and Stanley would have wanted to perform despite their ongoing disagreements with founding members Criss and Frehley, but that the Hall of Fame was too stringent in their rules. Kulick's own idea for a potential Hall of Fame induction would have been an acoustic set with all seven members present that night (Simmons, Stanley, Criss, Frehley, Kulick himself, Singer, and Thayer) performing. In November 2014 the band played a historic nine-show run at the Hard Rock Hotel & Casino, Las Vegas.

External videos
- Yume no Ukiyo ni Saite Mi na Kiss's first collaboration single with another artist.

On January 28, 2015, Kiss released a collaboration single with the Japanese female idol group Momoiro Clover Z, titled "Yume no Ukiyo ni Saite Mi na". It was the first time Kiss had issued a collaboration record with another artist. In Japan, it was released physically in two versions: "Momoiro Clover Z Edition" (on CD and Blu-ray) and "Kiss Edition" (CD only). An alternate mix of the single's title song was also included as an opening track on the Japanese-only SHM-CD album Best of Kiss 40, released in Japan on the same day.

Before the collaboration, the members of Kiss had watched concert videos of Momoiro Clover Z. Stanley later commented during an interview:

Spectacular show! Great choreography! Music like we never heard before. We said, "this is something we can do!" Somebody said, "Kiss, why are you doing it?" "Because we can!" It's two worlds getting together, doing something unbelievable. Music power rocks the world.

On July 21, 2015, the direct-to-DVD animated crossover film Scooby-Doo! and Kiss: Rock and Roll Mystery was released featuring Stanley, Simmons, Thayer, and Singer as themselves. The soundtrack of the film included a combination of old hits and one new track, "Don't Touch My Ascot".

On September 15, 2015, the RIAA announced that the band had earned more Gold records than any other American band in the association's 63-year history, with a total of 30 Gold album awards (including the band's four 1978 solo albums). Cary Sherman, the RIAA CEO and chairman, commented:

What an extraordinary achievement for an enduring band. Forty years later and the band is still rocking. Congratulations to Kiss on their Gold album milestone and continued success.

=== 2016–2023: continued activities and final tour ===
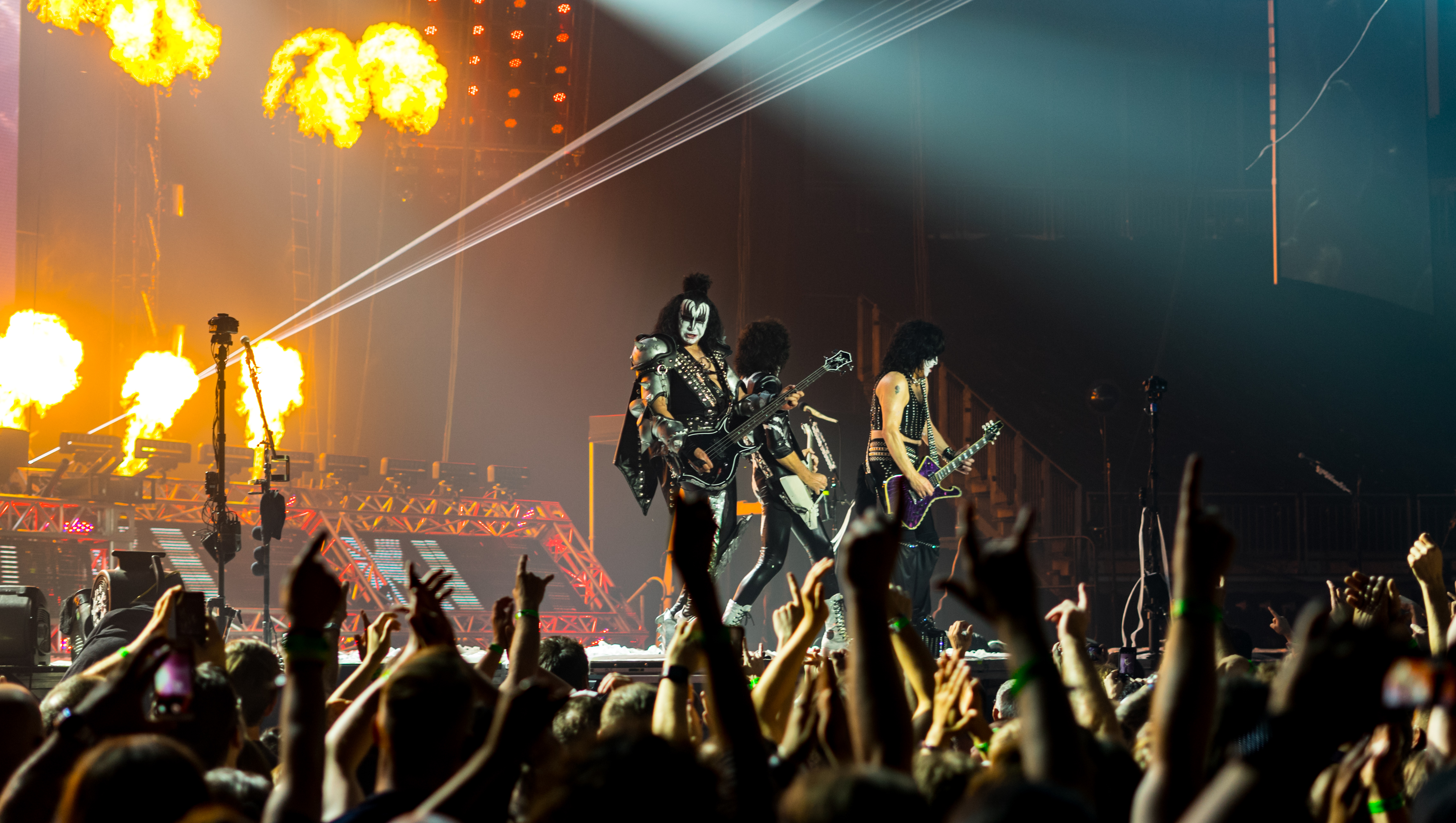
Kiss performing at the O_{2} Arena in London on May 31, 2017

In 2016, Kiss conducted a summer tour titled the Freedom to Rock Tour that visited less-frequented cities and smaller venues. The tour ran throughout the summer, with opening acts Caleb Johnson and the Dead Daisies. On December 13, 2016, Kiss performed during the season 11 finale of The Voice, accompanied by the season winner Sundance Head.

There had been conflicting stories regarding whether Kiss would record another album. Simmons had said "yes" in interviews, saying that he had songs written and lined up for a new album. Stanley and Thayer disputed this, however, and said that they did not vow to make one and that the band could move forward without new music. However, on March 25, 2021, Stanley stated that he would not rule out the possibility of Kiss producing new music, with both Simmons and Stanley stating in later interviews that the band did not need to record another album.

The band continued to perform shows in North America and Europe on the Kissworld Tour throughout 2017 and 2018.

On September 19, 2018, following a performance on America's Got Talent, Kiss announced that it would be ending its career with the End of the Road World Tour in 2019. Stanley commented:

This is gonna be our last tour. It will be the most explosive, biggest show we've ever done. People who love us, come see us. If you've never seen us, this is the time. This will be the show.

In October 2018, the band reunited with Ace Frehley and Bruce Kulick on the Kiss Kruise. It performed "2,000 Man", "New York Groove", "Nothin' to Lose", and "Rock and Roll All Nite". This was the first time Frehley and the band had performed together since 2002 for the closing ceremonies of the 2002 Winter Olympics, and Kulick's first time performing with the band live since his departure in 1996.

The band's final tour began on January 31 in Vancouver, British Columbia, Canada. In February 2019, Simmons said the farewell tour would likely gross between $150 million and $200 million, "not counting ancillaries, licensing, merchandise and stuff like that". During the first leg of the End of the Road World Tour, Kiss was accused by fans of lip syncing and using backing tracks. Three years prior, Simmons had been critical of bands using backing tracks on live shows. Former Skid Row vocalist Sebastian Bach defended Kiss, saying that the band did not lip-sync at the show he attended. Stanley did not confirm nor deny that he lip syncs on stage, saying he is taking care of his voice. Accusations were revived by fans following the band's Belgium performance when there was a slip-up with the fireworks and drum cues on the opening song. Doc McGhee, the band's manager, later confirmed that Stanley did sing fully, confirming simultaneously that Stanley will sing to tracks, but denied that he was lip syncing.

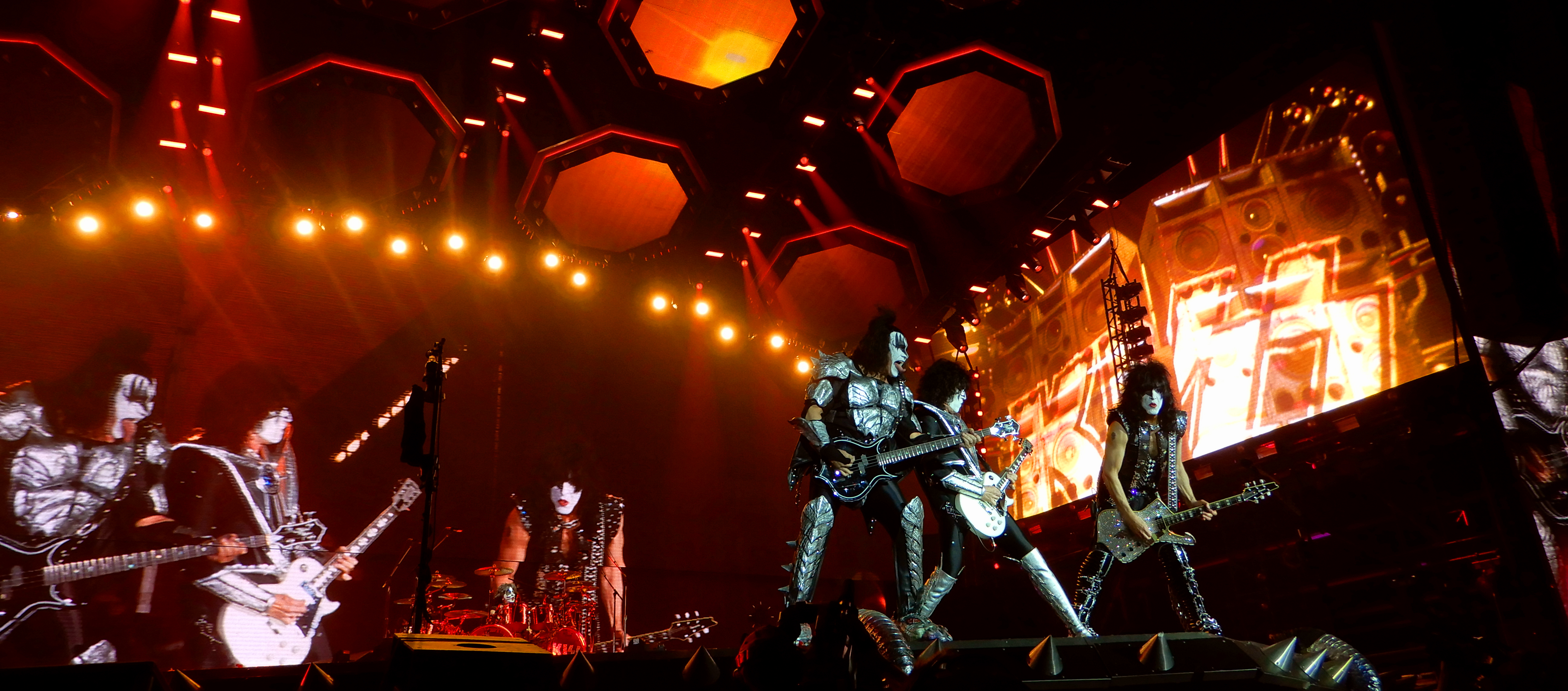
Kiss performing at Hellfest in Clisson on June 22, 2019

On November 14, 2019, the band announced that its Australia and New Zealand shows on its final tour had been canceled due to Stanley's health issues, and stated: "Doctor's orders ultimately have taken precedence and finally we now find ourselves with no choice but to surrender". In December 2019, X Japan's Yoshiki joined the band in Tokyo and Osaka on their Japan leg to perform "Beth" on piano and "Rock and Roll All Nite" on drums. They would later collaborate on a televised New Year's Eve performance in Japan, performing "Rock and Roll All Nite" under the combined name "YoshiKiss".

Kiss appeared again as special guests on America's Got Talent on February 17, 2020, with a televised performance of "Rock and Roll All Nite". The band would later dedicate "Do You Love Me" to Kobe Bryant and the 2020 Calabasas helicopter crash victims during the Los Angeles show at the Staples Center on March 4, 2020.

Following the events of the COVID-19 pandemic, the band temporarily halted its final tour, with Simmons commenting that the tour would resume once scientists had confirmed it was safe to do so. The 2020 edition of Kiss Kruise had been postponed to October 2021, as a result of the pandemic.

Kiss had announced on November 20, 2020, that they would perform an exclusive New Year's Eve 2020 livestream show. The Kiss New Year's Eve 2020 Goodbye livestream concert was produced by City Drive Studios and directed by Daniel Catullo. The pay-per-view concert was part of the Landmarks Live Series and was filmed with over fifty 4K cameras with 360-degree views on a 250-foot stage at The Royal Beach at Atlantis The Palm, Dubai. The performance broke two Guinness World Records: one for the highest flame projection in a music concert and another for the most flame projections launched simultaneously in a music concert.

On December 2, 2020, Simmons confirmed that the band would continue their final tour in the summer of 2021, in which there are another 150 shows left, as well as rescheduling the Australian leg of the final tour. In a June 2021 interview, Stanley remained optimistic that the band would complete their final tour when playing concerts was safe and discussed the inevitable retirement of Kiss. He also did not rule out the possibility of former members Ace Frehley and Peter Criss making appearances during the final tour, stating that he was "open to the idea". Simmons later invited Frehley to perform encores with the band for their final tour, but Frehley turned down the invitation, also ruling out the possibility of performing at the band's final show and expressing doubt that the band would stop touring.

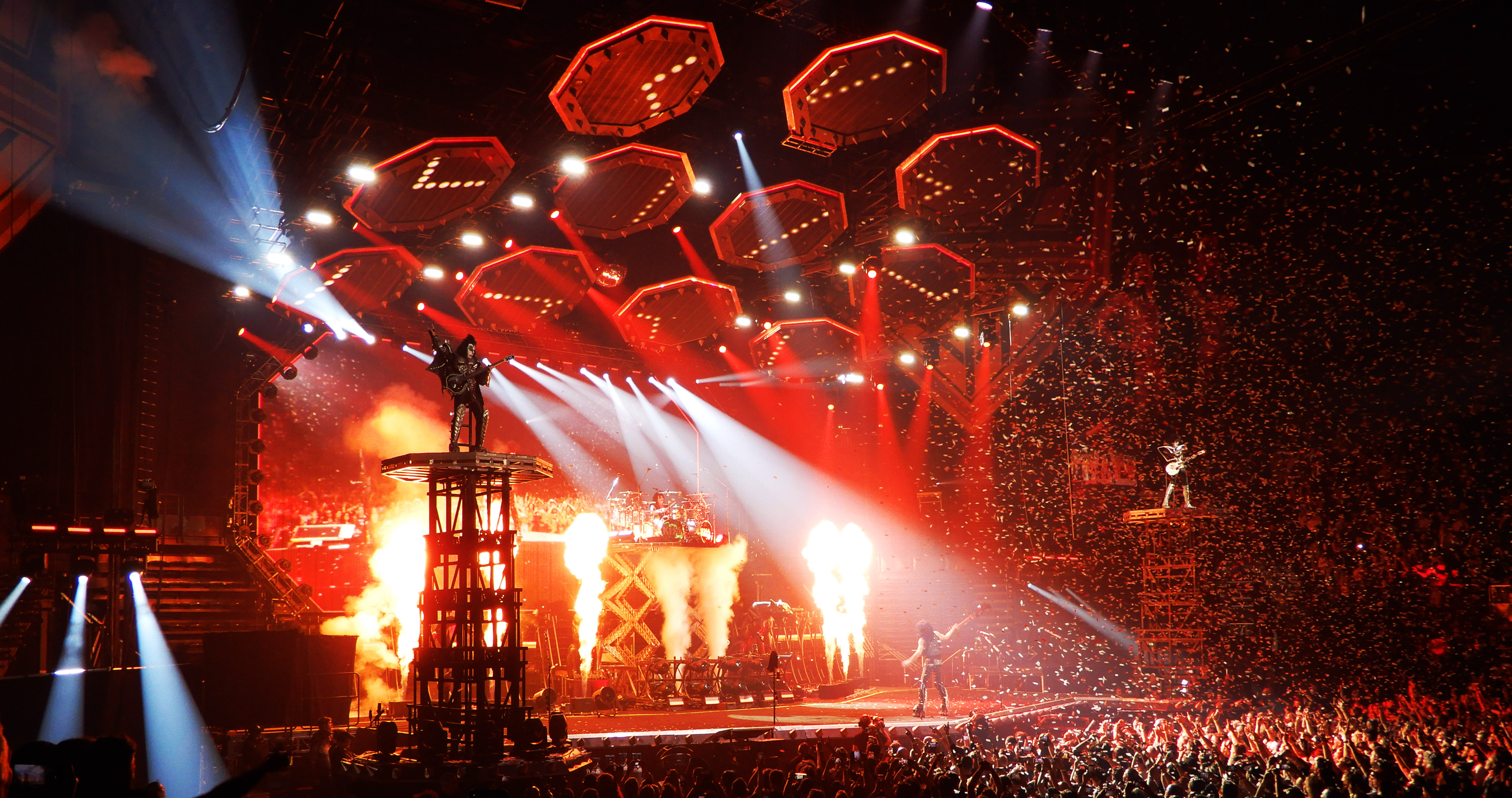
Kiss performing in Paris on June 7, 2022

It was announced on December 15, 2020, that a biographical film of the band was in the works, with hopes to release it on time with the band's final concert. The band's manager Doc McGhee spoke about the process: "Hopefully in the next week we'll have a company behind it, and we'll start finishing the script, and hopefully by the time we end we'll have a movie finished for July of next year." Deadline reported that Netflix has nearly finalized a deal to produce the Kiss biopic titled Shout it Out Loud, which will be released in 2026. The film will be made with close cooperation from both Simmons and Stanley, and will focus on the formative years of the band. Following the announcement of the biopic, a two-part documentary on the band titled Biography: Kisstory was also announced and aired on A&E on both June 27 and 28, 2021, with an exclusive live performance following after its debut at the Tribeca Film Festival on June 11, 2021. In September 2021, Iron Maiden and Kiss were inducted legacy members into The Metal Hall of Fame alongside Triumph, Stryper, guitarist Marty Friedman, and photographer Mark Weiss.

In an interview on October 6, 2021, Stanley confirmed that the final concert for Kiss would happen within the next year and a half, stating: "I believe strongly by the beginning of 2023 we will be finished, it seems only natural for the final show to be in New York. That is where the band started, and that was really the background for the band getting together and writing these songs and played loft parties and played clubs starting with an audience of probably 10 people. It seems we should go full circle." The band performed on board for the 2022 edition of the Kiss Kruise in October to November 2022, which was their final time performing on the cruise. In addition to adding another 100 cities on tour into 2023, Simmons stated that the band would be retiring out of self-respect and love for the fans and that he would be very emotional during the band's final performance which he presumed would take place around 2024, although band manager McGhee insisted that their final show would take place in 2023.

Kiss performed as the headline act for the pre-game entertainment at the 2023 AFL Grand Final in Australia on September 30, 2023, in front of more than 100,000 spectators in the stadium and a television audience of about 1.2 million in Australia alone, not including online streaming figures. A week after the AFL performance, Kiss performed their final Australian show in Sydney.

Despite the tour being their final, both Simmons and Stanley have not ruled out the possibility that Kiss could continue without them or the original members for a "new generation" with a possibility of occasional guest appearances. Simmons had expressed interest in the band performing a concert residency in Las Vegas following the announcement for the band's final shows, but Stanley later ruled out that possibility, stating that he "can't really see that happening". Simmons later confirmed on November 14, 2023, that while the tour was the band's last, the brand would continue with a cartoon show, further merchandise and Kiss-themed travelling shows with different musicians. He also reiterated that the band had no plans to record another album, citing music streaming and downloads as factors. Kiss performed their final show at Madison Square Garden in New York City on December 2, 2023, which was streamed via pay-per-view.

=== 2023–present: Aftermath and subsequent activities ===
At the end of the band's final show in New York City, it was announced that the band would live on as digital avatars for fully virtual stage show performances, which was created by Industrial Light and Magic and Pophouse, who had previously created ABBA's similar digital presentation, ABBA Voyage. While Simmons stated that $200 million was being invested for the avatars, the digital avatar shows are set to start in Las Vegas in 2027, with Thayer stating in a January 2024 interview that it would "take some time to get the imagery" where the band would want it to be, regarding it as the future of entertainment.

Simmons is currently continuing to work with the American rock-inspired restaurant Rock & Brews, and performing with his solo band, in which he played his first post-Kiss show at the opening of a Rock & Brews restaurant in Ridgefield, Washington in April 2024, shortly before performing at Summer Breeze in Brazil that same month. Stanley currently is continuing his painting career and his activities with Soul Station.

Kiss was sold to Pophouse for a reported $300 million, including all of their songs along with their brand and intellectual property in April 2024. While both Simmons and Stanley would remain as key roles for the projects being worked on in relation to the band with Pophouse, Simmons kept his focus on the digital avatars, referring to them as "the future of Kiss". Stanley had originally stated in a November 2024 interview that he was open to the band performing a one-off show, but later had come to terms that it was not going to happen again. After Simmons had postponed seventeen shows on his tour, a one-off unmasked show was announced for a special event called "Kiss Army Storms Vegas" at the Virgin Hotels Las Vegas which featured former members Kulick, Thayer and Singer as guests and took place from November 14 to 16, 2025. The event was later rebranded on July 8, 2025, to "Kiss Kruise: Landlocked in Vegas".

Kiss were selected as honorees for the Kennedy Center Honors on August 13, 2025.

In October 2025, Ace Frehley suffered a traumatic brain injury following a fall down a flight of stairs at his home, with TMZ reporting on October 16 that he had been on life support. Frehley died at the age of 74 after a family decision to remove life support.

In an interview with MusicRadar on December 11, 2025, Thayer stated that there was a "ton happening behind the scenes" for Kiss, but that he was "unsure" if the band was going to release new music. Stanley opened up more on the avatars in an interview with Rock of Nations, confirming that there would be shows around the world, and not just in Las Vegas. Simmons had also confirmed that a cartoon show was in the works, as well as a second Las Vegas Kiss Kruise later in 2026, which was confirmed by Stanley to take place in November. Simmons confirmed in May 2026 that the band has been in the studio recording new music that will be used for the Kiss avatar shows, which are set to take place in 2028. Thayer confirmed the band's recent studio activities in a September 2026 interview with Guitar World, saying: "We did record a great new song that Paul wrote. That's probably about as much as I can tell you right now."

On November 15, 2026, during a "Future of Kiss" panel discussion at "Kiss Kruise: Land-Locked In Vegas '26", Jeff Fura of Universal Music Enterprises confirmed that a new box set, titled Kiss Conquers Japan 1977, will be released in 2027 to coincide with the 50th anniversary of the performances.

== Artistry ==
=== Musical style and influences ===
Kiss has typically been classified under the genres of hard rock, heavy metal, shock rock, glam metal, glam rock, and both proto-punk and proto-speed metal. Most of its 1970s albums, particularly the first six released between 1974 and 1977 as well as 1982's Creatures of the Night and 1984's Animalize, featured a hard rock or traditional heavy metal style. 1979's Dynasty and 1980's Unmasked featured a more disco/pop rock sound, and 1981's Music from "The Elder" found the band dabbling in progressive rock. In 1983, starting with Lick It Up and the removal of its trademark makeup, the band began incorporating glam metal into its sound and visual image. Later, in the early 1990s, its sound grew heavier and abandoned the glam metal sound. In the mid-1990s, the band returned to its original sound.

Its music is described as "a commercially potent mix of anthemic, fist-pounding hard rock, driven by sleek hooks and ballads powered by loud guitars, cloying melodies, and sweeping strings. It was a sound that laid the groundwork for both arena rock and the pop-metal that dominated rock in the late 1980s." The first review of Kiss by Rolling Stone, in 1973, described the band as "an American Black Sabbath". The same magazine's review of Hotter than Hell stated that "with twin guitars hammering out catchy mondo-distorto riffs and bass and drums amiably bringing up the rear, Kiss spews forth a deceptively controlled type of thunderous hysteria." At the same time, Bennington Banner from Rock Music magazine said, "With its members' bizarre, Kabuki-like makeup, studded black leather costumes and arsenal of on-stage firepower – both musical and literal – Kiss represents the most extreme form of hard rock in 1974."

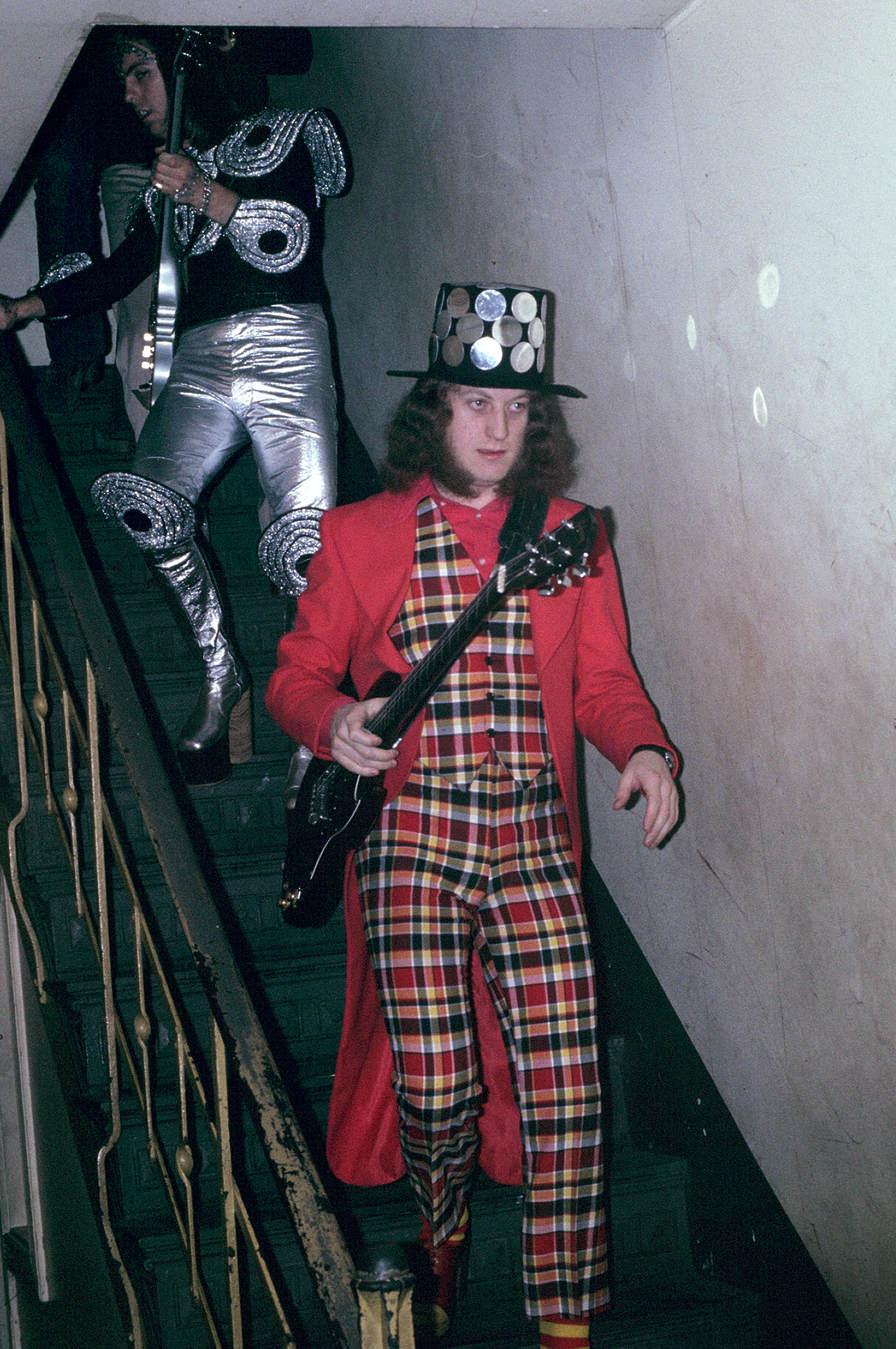
English glam rock band Slade (pictured in 1973) was among the band's influences.

Kiss was strongly influenced by Alice Cooper and New York Dolls, while Gene Simmons has stated that the band's "musical heart and soul lies in England". The Beatles and the Yardbirds' trio of rock guitarists Jimmy Page, Eric Clapton and Jeff Beck were among the British acts he praised, with Simmons stating, "I've ripped off so many English riffs, if the British influence wasn't there, we wouldn't be here. 'Rock and Roll All Nite' is a direct bastard child of Slade's 'Mama Weer All Crazee Now'". In his book, Kiss and Make-Up, Simmons wrote of the glam rock group Slade, "... we liked the way they connected with the crowd and the way they wrote anthems ... we wanted that same energy, that same irresistible simplicity".

=== Makeup designs ===
The band is famous for its iconic makeup designs, each of which represents a different character or persona. The original four designs consisted of: the "Starchild", the "Demon", the "Spaceman", and the "Catman". The band formerly included a practice of giving any new members a new persona, such as "the Fox" for Carr and "the Wizard" for Vincent; this practice was ended after Thayer and Singer took up Frehley's "Spaceman" and Criss's "Catman" personas respectively. When asked on the matter, Simmons stated "Why wouldn't we use the classic makeup? We own it". Criss relinquished his rights to his makeup when he left the band in 2004, which he later regretted, saying "I'm pissed at myself that my makeup slipped through my hands", while Frehley claimed he licensed his design to the band and would get it back, a notion which Stanley has called "a fantasy".

During 1973–1974, Stanley occasionally used an alternative makeup design called the "Bandit" for select photo-shoots and live shows after Neil Bogart, head of Casablanca Records, suggested to him that he use a design that was symmetrical like those of the rest of the band. During this time, he was also still using the Starchild makeup—sometimes even using both designs at the same photo-shoots. In 1974, he stopped using the Bandit design permanently. On the cover of the band's debut album, Criss used a drastically different variation of his Catman makeup (dubbed the "Pantomime Cat") after he allowed the makeup artist at the shoot to use their own ideas instead of following the usual design. Carr was originally going to be the "Hawk", a design which Simmons recalled in his autobiography looked like Big Bird from Sesame Street. One photo of Carr wearing this proposed design exists today, and also one of a mannequin Stanley set up wearing the proposed makeup and outfit. Unlike the Bandit and Pantomime Cat, this alternative design was never used in any official capacity. The Hawk design was also considered for Vincent and Singer. Contrary to a false belief spread among the fan community of the band ("The Ankh Warrior"), the official name for Vincent's persona is "The Wiz", as per his contract, press releases for the Creatures of the Night tour, magazine interviews, and Simmons's autobiography.

St. John and Kulick were members of Kiss only during the non-makeup period. Kulick stated that had he ever worn makeup in the band, he would have liked to have been the "Dog": "I figure that since there's already a cat in the band, I should probably be the dog. I'd have a big circle around one eye and I'd look like Petey from the Little Rascals. I've actually seen one or two fan renditions of what that might look like, so yeah, I'd be the dog." The four original makeup designs have been registered with the U.S. Patent and Trademark Office, with ownership and licensing rights held by Kiss Catalog, Inc (now owned by Pophouse).

The Starchild
Paul Stanley
(1973–1983, 1990, 1996–2023)

The Demon
Gene Simmons
(1973–1983, 1990, 1996–2023)

The Spaceman
Ace Frehley ("Space Ace")
(1973–1982, 1996–2002)
Tommy Thayer
(2002–2023)

The Catman
Peter Criss
(1973–1980, 1996–2000, 2002–2004)
Eric Singer
(2001–2002, 2004–2023)

The Fox
Eric Carr
(1980–1983)

The Wiz
Vinnie Vincent
(1982–1983)

There is debate over whether Kiss copied the Brazilian group Secos & Molhados in adopting their iconic face paint and this has been a topic of discussion among fans and media. Secos & Molhados, formed in 1971, were known for their extravagant costumes and face paint, debuting their self-titled album in August 1973. Kiss, emerging from New York's glam scene, began performing with their distinctive makeup in early 1973, releasing their debut album in February 1974. While some suggest that Kiss may have been influenced by Secos & Molhados, the timeline indicates that both bands developed their styles independently around the same period. Gene Simmons of Kiss has dismissed claims of copying, comparing them to unfounded legends.

In the broader context of rock history, face paint has been utilized by various artists prior to both bands. Performers like Arthur Brown and Alice Cooper in the 1960s and early 1970s incorporated face paint into their acts, contributing to the theatricality of rock performances.

While both Secos & Molhados and Kiss employed distinctive face paint and theatrical elements in their performances, the evidence suggests that these similarities arose independently, influenced by the broader trends in the rock and glam scenes of the early 1970s.

== Legacy ==
The world of concert touring was changed by Kiss's practice of erecting uniquely designed stage sets. Tours got larger, carrying more personnel and equipment, including sets, costumes, sound and lighting gear, and pyrotechnics, all requiring more trucking and the total cost increasing by millions of dollars. Kiss also innovated with a significant expansion of concert merchandising, selling non-musical Kiss-branded goods to concertgoers. The sales of merchandise helped pay for the concert expenses and bring a profit to the band as well as give them more of a presence without relying solely on radio. Other bands copied Kiss by selling their own branded goods at concerts, a practice which became more of a necessity in the 1980s with increasing costs of touring. In addition to concert merchandising, Kiss has extended its influence to include a full Kiss-themed mini-golf course at the Rio All-Suite Hotel & Casino in Las Vegas, Nevada.

== Band members ==
Final lineup

- Paul Stanley – lead and backing vocals, rhythm guitar (1973–2023)
- Gene Simmons – lead and backing vocals, bass (1973–2023)
- Eric Singer – drums, backing and lead vocals (1991–1996, 2001–2002, 2004–2023)
- Tommy Thayer – lead guitar, backing and lead vocals (2002–2023)

Former

- Ace Frehley – lead guitar, backing and lead vocals (1973–1982, 1996–2002; died 2025)
- Peter Criss – drums, backing and lead vocals (1973–1980, 1996–2000, 2002–2004)
- Eric Carr – drums, backing and lead vocals (1980–1991; his death)
- Vinnie Vincent – lead guitar, backing vocals (1982–1984)
- Mark St. John – lead guitar, backing vocals (1984; died 2007)
- Bruce Kulick – lead guitar, backing vocals (1984–1996)

== Discography ==
Studio albums

- Kiss (1974)
- Hotter than Hell (1974)
- Dressed to Kill (1975)
- Destroyer (1976)
- Rock and Roll Over (1976)
- Love Gun (1977)
- Ace Frehley (1978)
- Gene Simmons (1978)
- Paul Stanley (1978)
- Peter Criss (1978)
- Dynasty (1979)
- Unmasked (1980)
- Music from "The Elder" (1981)
- Creatures of the Night (1982)
- Lick It Up (1983)
- Animalize (1984)
- Asylum (1985)
- Crazy Nights (1987)
- Hot in the Shade (1989)
- Revenge (1992)
- Carnival of Souls: The Final Sessions (1997)
- Psycho Circus (1998)
- Sonic Boom (2009)
- Monster (2012)

== Tours ==
- Club Tour (1973–1974)
- Kiss Tour (1974)
- Hotter than Hell Tour (1974–1975)
- Dressed to Kill Tour (1975)
- Alive! Tour (1975–1976)
- Destroyer Tour (1976)
- Rock & Roll Over Tour (1976–1977)
- Love Gun Tour (1977)
- Alive II Tour (1977–1978)
- Dynasty Tour (1979)
- Unmasked Tour (1980)
- Creatures of the Night Tour/10th Anniversary Tour (1982–1983)
- Lick It Up World Tour (1983–1984)
- Animalize World Tour (1984–1985)
- Asylum Tour (1985–1986)
- Crazy Nights World Tour (1987–1988)
- Hot in the Shade Tour (1990)
- Revenge Tour (1992)
- Kiss My Ass Tour (1994–1995)
- Alive/Worldwide Tour (1996–1997)
- Psycho Circus World Tour (1998–1999)
- The Farewell Tour (2000–2001)
- World Domination Tour (2003)
- Rock the Nation World Tour (2004)
- Rising Sun Tour (2006)
- Hit 'n Run Tour (2007)
- Alive 35 World Tour (2008–2010)
- Sonic Boom over Europe Tour (2010)
- The Hottest Show on Earth Tour (2010–2011)
- The Tour (2012)
- Monster World Tour (2012–2013)
- Kiss 40th Anniversary World Tour (2014–2015)
- Freedom to Rock Tour (2016)
- Kissworld Tour (2017–2018)
- End of the Road World Tour (2019–2023)

== See also ==
- Album era – 1960s–2000s period in the music industry
- Kiss videography
- List of artists who reached number one on the U.S. Mainstream Rock chart
- List of bestselling music artists
- List of songs recorded by Kiss
