= Freedom to Rock Tour =

2016 concert tour by Kiss

- Tour by Kiss
- Poster with the tour dates
- Location: North America
- Start date: July 4, 2016
- End date: October 30, 2016
- Legs: 1
- No. of shows: 42

Kiss concert chronology
- Kiss 40th Anniversary World Tour (2014–2015); Freedom to Rock Tour (2016); Kissworld Tour (2017–2018)

The Freedom to Rock Tour was a concert tour by the American rock band Kiss. The tour hit secondary markets and smaller cities in 2016. The tour started on July 4 in Tucson, Arizona, marking a return to the city for the first time since 2000. The tour was also the first full scale North American tour for the band since 2014.

In the tour program for the band's final tour, Stanley reflected on the tour:

The Freedom to Rock tour is a big, awesome show, and the band is big and awesome. Anybody can pattern their show on what we've done in the past, but you'll never be us. That's why we're Kiss, and that's why we've been around 40 years. Kiss has multi-generational appeal because Kiss has an appeal that's timeless. Kiss isn't only about music. It's about an attitude, it's about a way of life and it's about a philosophy of approaching life. The idea of going for what you believe in and not stopping until you achieve or attain it. It's one of the great thrills and sources of satisfaction to see somebody who's brought their mother or father to a show and see these people really enjoying it and getting it.

== History ==
At the Rockford, Illinois show, Cheap Trick's Rick Nielsen joined the band onstage to play "Rock and Roll All Nite".

== Reception ==
Emerson Malone of the Daily Emerald described the Eugene, Oregon show as "Musically, the band still sounds incredible and the set came with numerous things to love: Thayer's inky, sludgy guitar in "Calling Dr. Love" and "Strutter," Singer's drum fills in "Cold Gin," and Singer taking the reins on vocals during the lighter-sparking ballad "Beth."

Lacey Paige, of Exclaim, praised the nostalgic aspect of a Kiss concert, as "For younger audiences, experiencing a live Kiss concert for the first time is like stepping into a time machine and going back to the late 1970s, when the New York-based glam-shock-rockers' career soared to the pinnacle of rock'n'roll prestige. A Kiss show perfectly encapsulates the zeitgeist of that era, giving older generations of fans a chance to relive and relish the essence of their youth."

Mike Baltierra, of Seattle Music Insider, did a positive review of the Kennewick, Washington concert: "Stanley had the crowd eating out of the palm of his hand. While Simmons lurked over the crowd, Thayer ripped out riff after riff, and Singer pounded on the drums".

== Set list ==
This is the set list from the first show of the tour, and may not represent the majority of the tour:

1. "Detroit Rock City"
2. "Deuce"
3. "Shout It Out Loud"
4. "Do You Love Me?"
5. "I Love It Loud"
6. "Flaming Youth"
7. "God of Thunder" (Gene Solo, Spits Blood and Flies)
8. "Psycho Circus"
9. "Shock Me" (Tommy Guitar Solo)
10. "Cold Gin"
11. "Lick It Up"
12. "War Machine"
13. "Love Gun"
14. "Black Diamond"
  Encore
15. "Beth"
16. "The Star-Spangled Banner" (John Stafford Smith cover)
17. "Rock and Roll All Nite"

Notes

- "Flaming Youth" not played in Tucson
- "Strutter" only played in Boise, Eugene and Kennewick
- "100,000 Years" only played in Tucson, Boise, Eugene and Kennewick
- "I Was Made for Lovin' You" only played in Edmonton
- "O Canada" only played in Edmonton and Calgary
- "God of Thunder" not played in Tucson, Boise, Eugene and Kennewick
- "Creatures of the Night" was played in Grand Rapids but otherwise replaced by "Do You Love Me?"

== Tour dates ==
Date	City	Country	Venue	Support Act
July 4, 2016	Tucson	United States	AVA Amphitheater	Magnetico
July 7, 2016	Boise	United States	Taco Bell Arena	Caleb Johnson
July 9, 2016	Eugene	United States	Matthew Knight Arena	Caleb Johnson
July 10, 2016	Kennewick	United States	Toyota Center	Caleb Johnson
July 12, 2016	Edmonton	Canada	Rexall Place	Caleb Johnson
July 13, 2016	Calgary	Canada	Stampede Roundup Festival	Caleb Johnson
July 15, 2016	Spokane	United States	Spokane Arena	Caleb Johnson
July 16, 2016	Bozeman	United States	Brick Breeden Fieldhouse	Caleb Johnson
July 18, 2016	Colorado Springs	United States	Broadmoor World Arena	Caleb Johnson
July 20, 2016	Independence	United States	Silverstein Eye Centers Arena	Caleb Johnson
July 22, 2016	Lincoln	United States	Pinnacle Bank Arena	Caleb Johnson
July 23, 2016	Springfield	United States	JQH Arena	Caleb Johnson
July 25, 2016	Wichita	United States	Intrust Bank Arena	Caleb Johnson
July 27, 2016	Sioux City	United States	Tyson Events Center	Caleb Johnson
July 29, 2016	Cheyenne	United States	Cheyenne Frontier Days	Caleb Johnson
July 30, 2016	Minot	United States	North Dakota State Fair	Caleb Johnson
August 1, 2016	Mankato	United States	Verizon Wireless Center	Caleb Johnson
August 3, 2016	Duluth	United States	Amsoil Arena	Caleb Johnson
August 5, 2016	Moline	United States	iWireless Center	Caleb Johnson
August 6, 2016	La Crosse	United States	La Crosse Center	Caleb Johnson
August 8, 2016	Milwaukee	United States	BMO Harris Bradley Center	Caleb Johnson
August 10, 2016	Green Bay	United States	Resch Center	Caleb Johnson
August 12, 2016	Fort Wayne	United States	Allen County War Memorial Coliseum	The Dead Daisies
August 13, 2016	Grand Rapids	United States	Van Andel Arena	The Dead Daisies
August 15, 2016	Saginaw	United States	Dow Event Center	The Dead Daisies
August 17, 2016	Springfield	United States	Illinois State Fair	The Dead Daisies
August 19, 2016	Des Moines	United States	Iowa State Fair	The Dead Daisies
August 20, 2016	Rockford	United States	BMO Harris Bank Center	The Dead Daisies
August 22, 2016	Dayton	United States	Nutter Center	The Dead Daisies
August 24, 2016	Toledo	United States	Huntington Center	The Dead Daisies
August 26, 2016	Youngstown	United States	Covelli Centre	The Dead Daisies
August 27, 2016	Erie	United States	Erie Insurance Arena	The Dead Daisies
August 29, 2016	Rochester	United States	Blue Cross Arena	The Dead Daisies
August 30, 2016	University Park	United States	Bryce Jordan Center	The Dead Daisies
September 1, 2016	Allentown	United States	Great Allentown Fair	The Dead Daisies
September 3, 2016	Worcester	United States	DCU Center	The Dead Daisies
September 4, 2016	Portland	United States	Cross Insurance Arena	The Dead Daisies
September 7, 2016	Bridgeport	United States	Webster Bank Arena	The Dead Daisies
September 9, 2016	Richmond	United States	Richmond Coliseum	The Dead Daisies
September 10, 2016	Huntington	United States	Big Sandy Superstore Arena	The Dead Daisies
October 29, 2016	Uncasville	United States	Mohegan Sun Arena	—N/a
October 30, 2016	Cabazon	United States	Morongo Casino, Resort & Spa	—N/a

=== Box office score data ===
Venue	City	Tickets sold / available	Gross revenue (USD)
Taco Bell Arena	Boise	5,631 / 7,274	$261,604
Matthew Knight Arena	Eugene	4,926 / 5,794	$294,844
Toyota Center	Kennewick	4,687 / 5,528	$383,214
Brick Breeden Fieldhouse	Bozeman	5,032 / 5,032	$420,130
Broadmoor World Arena	Colorado Springs	4,885 / 6,225	$276,276
Silverstein Eye Centers Arena	Independence	4,996 / 6,385	$284,771
Pinnacle Bank Arena	Lincoln	7,535 / 10,027	$524,921
JQH Arena	Springfield	6,870 / 8,017	$505,754
INTRUST Bank Arena	Wichita	7,841 / 10,153	$495,153
Tyson Events Center	Sioux City	4,511 / 5,984	$281,261
Verizon Wireless Center	Mankato	4,328 / 5,176	$279,445
AMSOIL Arena	Duluth	5,157 / 5,883	$406,092
i wireless Center	Moline	7,214 / 9,885	$505,480
La Crosse Center	La Crosse	5,061 / 7,000	$247,782
Allen County War Memorial Coliseum	Fort Wayne	6,989 / 8,343	$495,864
Van Andel Arena	Grand Rapids	7,259 / 9,222	$482,773
Dow Event Center	Saginaw	4,287 / 5,484	$284,780
Resch Center	Green Bay	6,265 / 7,420	$424,122
BMO Harris Bank Center	Rockford	5,693 / 7,208	$395,872
Ervin J. Nutter Center	Dayton	6,194 / 8,000	$453,729
Huntington Center	Toledo	5,562 / 6,687	$359,271
Covelli Centre	Youngstown	5,289 / 5,598	$472,700
Bryce Jordan Center	University Park	4,530 / 6,005	$301,423
Erie Insurance Arena	Erie	5,431 / 7,054	$279,264
Blue Cross Arena	Rochester	5,677 / 7,172	$268,616
DCU Center	Worcester	5,656 / 7,541	$445,487
Cross Insurance Arena	Portland	4,888 / 6,436	$334,071
Webster Bank Arena	Bridgeport	5,261 / 6,916	$366,856
Richmond Coliseum	Richmond	6,407 / 8,368	$385,873
Big Sandy Superstore Arena	Huntington	6,109 / 6,109	$607,645
Parque Fundidora	Monterrey	17,511 / 36,015	$793,407
TOTAL		187,718 / 236,926 (80.1%)	$12,424,982

== Gross ==
The tour grossed $15.4 million, with 233,262 tickets sold in 40 shows.

== Personnel ==
=== Kiss ===
- Paul Stanley – vocals, rhythm guitar
- Gene Simmons – vocals, bass
- Tommy Thayer – lead guitar, vocals
- Eric Singer – drums, vocals

Staff

- Francis Stueber - introduction voice

=== Guest appearances ===
- Rick Nielsen – guest guitarist (August 20, 2016)
