= Kissworld Tour =

2017–2018 concert tour by Kiss

- Tour by Kiss
- Poster with the UK tour dates
- Location: Europe; North America
- Start date: May 1, 2017
- End date: July 14, 2018
- Legs: 3
- No. of shows: 32; 1 cancelled

Kiss concert chronology
- Freedom to Rock Tour (2016); Kissworld Tour (2017–2018); End of the Road World Tour (2019–2023)

The Kissworld Tour was a concert tour by the American rock band Kiss. The tour marked the return of the Creatures of the Night costumes which had previously been seen on the sixth annual Kiss Kruise. The tour began on May 1, 2017, in Moscow, Russia and concluded in Viveiro, Spain on July 14, 2018.

In the tour program for the band's final tour, both Thayer and Singer reflected on the tour:

The dressing scene before a Kiss show is very serene. Everybody has their own distinctive personalities. I've heard people say that I'm the quiet one and that's probably true. I don't say as much but that's just the way I am and that's how I'm most comfortable. – Tommy Thayer

You've heard people getting ready for a game like a football player how they get themselves amped up. That's kind of what we do. Sometimes people will be very quiet and focus and keep to themselves but most of the time I'm jumping around and acting crazy. – Eric Singer

== Reception ==
Ben Siegel from The Buffalo News described the Niagara Falls concert as "These guys are insane entertainers. They’re intense. They’re flammable. Simmons’s mouth, and that infamously long tongue of his, drip with (stage) blood. They own this genre of hard rock. They invented it."

== Set lists ==
Europe setlist (2017)

1. "Deuce"
2. "Shout It Out Loud"
3. "Lick It Up"
4. "I Love It Loud"
5. "Firehouse"
6. "Shock Me"
7. "Flaming Youth"
8. "God of Thunder"
9. "Crazy Crazy Nights"
10. "War Machine"
11. "Say Yeah"
12. "Psycho Circus"
13. "Black Diamond"
14. "Rock and Roll All Nite"

Encore

15. "I Was Made for Lovin' You"
16. "Detroit Rock City"

North America setlist

1. "Deuce"
2. "Shout It Out Loud"
3. "Lick It Up"
4. "I Love It Loud"
5. "Love Gun"
6. "Firehouse"
7. "Shock Me"
8. "Flaming Youth"
9. "God of Thunder"
10. "Say Yeah"
11. "War Machine"
12. "Psycho Circus"
13. "Black Diamond"
14. "Rock and Roll All Nite"

Encore

15. "Cold Gin"
16. "Detroit Rock City"

Europe setlist (2018)

1. "Deuce"
2. "Shout It Out Loud"
3. "War Machine"
4. "Firehouse"
5. "Shock Me"
6. "Say Yeah"
7. "I Love It Loud"
8. "Flaming Youth"
9. "Calling Dr. Love"
10. "Lick It Up"
11. "God of Thunder"
12. "I Was Made for Lovin' You"
13. "Love Gun"
14. "Black Diamond"

Encore

15. "Cold Gin"
16. "Detroit Rock City"
17. "Rock and Roll All Nite"

== Tour dates ==
List of 2017 concerts
Date	City	Country	Venue
May 1, 2017	Moscow	Russia	Olimpiyskiy Arena
May 4, 2017	Helsinki	Finland	Hartwall Arena
May 6, 2017	Stockholm	Sweden	Tele2 Arena
May 7, 2017	Oslo	Norway	Oslo Spektrum
May 9, 2017	Horsens	Denmark	Forum Horsens
May 10, 2017	Gothenburg	Sweden	Scandinavium
May 12, 2017	Dortmund	Germany	Westfalenhalle
May 13, 2017	Stuttgart	Germany	Schleyerhalle
May 15, 2017	Turin	Italy	Pala Alpitour
May 16, 2017	Bologna	Italy	Unipol Arena
May 18, 2017	Munich	Germany	Olympiahalle
May 20, 2017	Brno	Czech Republic	Brno Exhibition Centre
May 21, 2017	Vienna	Austria	Wiener Stadthalle
May 23, 2017	Frankfurt	Germany	Festhalle Frankfurt
May 24, 2017	Rotterdam	Netherlands	Rotterdam Ahoy
May 27, 2017	Glasgow	Scotland	The SSE Hydro
May 28, 2017	Birmingham	England	Barclaycard Arena
May 31, 2017	London	England	The O_{2} Arena
July 14, 2017	Bridgeview	United States	Chicago Open Air
July 15, 2017	Hinckley	United States	Grand Casino Hinckley Amphitheater
August 18, 2017	Orillia	Canada	Casino Rama
August 19, 2017	Niagara Falls	United States	Seneca Niagara Casino & Hotel
August 20, 2017	Aurora	United States	RiverEdge Park
September 26, 2017	Sugar Land	United States	Smart Financial Centre at Sugar Land
September 27, 2017	Irving	United States	The Pavilion at Toyota Music Factory
September 28, 2017	Rogers	United States	Walmart Arkansas Music Pavilion
September 30, 2017	Gretna	United States	Gretna Heritage Festival

List of 2018 concerts
Date	City	Country	Venue
July 7, 2018	Barcelona	Spain	Barcelona Rock Fest
July 8, 2018	Madrid	Spain	WiZink Center
July 10, 2018	Lisbon	Portugal	Oeiras Municipal Stadium
July 12, 2018	Cordoba	Spain	Plaza De Toros
July 14, 2018	Viveiro	Spain	Resurrection Festival

=== Cancelled shows ===
Date	City	Country	Venue	Reason
May 30, 2017	Manchester	England	Manchester Arena	Manchester Arena bombing

== Personnel ==
=== Kiss ===
- Paul Stanley – vocals, rhythm guitar
- Gene Simmons – vocals, bass
- Tommy Thayer – lead guitar, vocals
- Eric Singer – drums, vocals

Staff

- Francis Stueber - introduction voice
