= Rock2Wgtn =

Music festival in Wellington, New Zealand

- Genre: Rock, Metal,
- Dates: 22 and 23 March 2008
- Locations: Wellington, New Zealand
- Years active: 2008
- Founders: Capital C Concerts
- Website: Official Website

The Rock2Wgtn Festival was a two-day music festival. It is the second major music festival to be held in New Zealand, the first being the Big Day Out, but Rock2Wgtn is the first purely metal/rock festival. It is also the first two-day festival, as the Big Day Out is held over a single day. It was held at the Westpac Stadium, informally known as The Cake Tin due to the shape of the building.

== Rock2Wgtn 2008 ==

The Rock2Wgtn Festival was held Easter 2008. The headliners were Kiss and Ozzy Osbourne. The other bands to play were Whitesnake, Lordi, Alice Cooper, and Poison.

New Zealand bands The Valves, Sonic Altar, and The Symphony of Screams played support over the 2 nights.

The special effects were supplied by Weta Workshop who have previously supplied effects for movies such as The Lord of The Rings.

Attendance over the 2 days was around 50,000. The event was not a commercial success, and it was noted that Kiss bassist/vocalist Gene Simmons insisted on large volumes of free tickets being given out in order to obviate the appreciably noticeable empty seats at the venue.

Acts
Saturday	Sunday
KISS; Sonic Altar; Alice Cooper; The Symphony of Screams; Lordi	Ozzy Osbourne; The Symphony of Screams; Whitesnake; Sonic Altar; Poison; The Valves

== Band Line Ups (as of show) ==
Lordi
Mr. Lordi - vocals
Amen - guitar
OX - bass
Kita - drums, vocals
Awa - keyboards, vocals

Alice Cooper
Alice Cooper - vocals
Brent Fitz - drums
Keri Kelli - guitar
Chuck Garric - bass
Jason Hook - guitar

Kiss
Paul Stanley - rhythm guitar, lead vocals
Gene Simmons - bass guitar, lead vocals
Tommy Thayer - lead guitar
Eric Singer - drums, vocals

Poison
Bret Michaels - vocals, guitar, harmonica
C. C. DeVille - guitar, vocals
Bobby Dall - bass guitar, keyboards, vocals
Rikki Rockett - drums, percussion, vocals

Whitesnake
David Coverdale - vocals
Doug Aldrich - guitar
Reb Beach - guitar
Uriah Duffy - bass
Timothy Drury - keyboards
Chris Frazier - drums

Ozzy Osbourne
Ozzy Osbourne - vocals
Zakk Wylde - guitar
Rob "Blasko" Nicholson - bass
Mike Bordin - drums
John Sinclair - keyboards

== Future ==
Capital C website image

The 2008 Rock2Wgtn was the last one of its kind in Wellington, with it being announced that the next Rock2Wgtn will be in another city (with the name being changed to suit). On the promoters website, https://www.capitalc.co.nz/, an image is shown with the text "In 2009 we are bringing it on again! Not Wellington... not easter... new artists!", along with a new logo that says "Rock2????".
However mid-2009 it got changed to Rock22010 with no word on delays. Still stating New Artist, New City, New Date. As of September 2011 the Rock2Wgtn website doesn't even exist.
