= Big A =

Big A or The Big A is the nickname of the following:

- Nickname for Atlanta, Georgia
- Angel Stadium (formey Anaheim Stadium), California
  - Big A Sign
- USS Arizona (BB-39), that Japanese bombers sank in the attack on Pearl Harbor
- Aqueduct Racetrack, a horse racing facility in New York City
- Big Apple, nickname for New York City
- Big "A" or Charlotte Drake, a character in Pretty Little Liars
- Nickname for Twitch Streamer Atrioc
