= Lynyrd Skynyrd Tribute Tour =

1987–88 concert tour by Lynyrd Skynyrd

- Tour by Lynyrd Skynyrd
- Poster to the final concert in Antioch, Nashville
- Associated album: Lynyrd Skynyrd Live: Southern by the Grace of God
- Start date: September 23, 1987
- End date: September 25, 1988
- No. of shows: 84

Lynyrd Skynyrd concert chronology
- Street Survivors Tour (1977); Lynyrd Skynyrd Tribute Tour (1987–88); Lynyrd Skynyrd 1991 Tour (1991–92)

The Lynyrd Skynyrd Tribute Tour was a tour that was undertaken to pay tribute to the original band members who died in a plane crash in 1977. The tour began in the fall of 1987, in honor of the 10-year anniversary of the plane crash. A number of surviving members reunited for the tour. Original members Gary Rossington, Billy Powell and Leon Wilkeson were joined by Ed King (original member who had left the band in 1975), Artimus Pyle (drummer at the time of the plane crash), Randall Hall and Johnny Van Zant.

== History ==
Rossington, who had formed the original band with lead singer Ronnie Van Zant was initially reluctant to do the tour. He was, in the words of his wife Dale Krantz-Rossington, still "very emotional" about the preceding events and about the anniversary of the plane crash. Eventually, Rossington decided that if the tour was to be done right, and if his fallen colleagues were to be honored properly, that he should be involved.

Original guitarist and founding member, Allen Collins, was unable to play as a result of being paralyzed in a car crash in 1986. Collins served as musical director for the tour, picking setlists and making cameo appearances onstage. He chose former bandmate Randall Hall (who had played with Collins in the Allen Collins Band) to take his spot.

Ronnie Van Zant's youngest brother, Johnny, was chosen to assume the role of lead vocalist. Other candidates were considered, including Paul Rodgers (of Free and Bad Company fame). Ronnie had been a huge Paul Rodgers fan and even owned a boat named "Bad Company" at one point. Ultimately though, it was Johnny who was deemed to be the best replacement for his brother.

The first leg of the tour was enormously successful. Moved by the loyalty and reaction of the fans, the band elected to add a second leg (which ran through the summer of 1988). The Tribute Tour Band played an inspired selection of classic Skynyrd tunes and ended the show with a heart-wrenching instrumental version of Free Bird.

The Rossington Band opened for the entire tour, playing a mixture of Rossington band original material and earlier material from the Rossington/Collins Band era. Dale Krantz-Rossington sang lead vocals for the Rossington Band and backup vocals for the Skynyrd set. Between the Rossington Band set and the Skynyrd set, old videos of the original Skynyrd band were shown on the bigscreen featuring full length versions of such songs as "T for Texas", "Don't Ask Me No Questions", "Cry for the Bad Man" and "Whiskey Rock-A-Roller".

== Typical setlist ==
- "Workin' for MCA"
- "I Ain't the One"
- "Saturday Night Special"
- "The Needle and the Spoon"
- "That Smell"
- "I Know a Little"
- "Gimme Three Steps"
- "Call Me the Breeze"
- "Swamp Music"
- "You Got That Right"
- "What's Your Name"
- "Gimme Back My Bullets"
- "Simple Man"
- "Sweet Home Alabama"
- "Free Bird"

== Tour dates ==
| Date | City | Country | Venue |
Leg 1
| September 23, 1987 | Concord | United States | Concord Pavilion |
| September 24, 1987 | Reno | United States | Lawlor Events Center |
| September 25, 1987 | Sacramento | United States | Cal Expo Amphitheatre |
| September 26, 1987 | Mountain View | United States | Shoreline Amphitheatre |
| September 27, 1987 | Irvine | United States | Irvine Meadows |
| September 28, 1987 | Los Angeles | United States | Universal Amphitheatre |
| September 29, 1987 | Wheeling | United States | Wheeling Civic Center |
| September 30, 1987 | St. Louis | United States | St. Louis Arena |
| October 1, 1987 | Cincinnati | United States | Cincinnati Gardens |
| October 2, 1987 | Chicago | United States | UIC Pavilion |
| October 3, 1987 | Detroit | United States | Joe Louis Arena |
| October 4, 1987 | Pittsburgh | United States | Civic Arena |
| October 6, 1987 | Landover | United States | Capital Centre |
| October 8, 1987 | Worcester | United States | Centrum |
| October 9, 1987 | Uniondale | United States | Nassau Veterans Memorial Coliseum |
| October 10, 1987 | New Haven | United States | Veterans Memorial Coliseum |
| October 11, 1987 | Philadelphia | United States | Spectrum |
| October 14, 1987 | Atlanta | United States | Omni Coliseum |
| October 15, 1987 | Atlanta | United States | Omni Coliseum |
| October 16, 1987 | Jacksonville | United States | Jacksonville Coliseum |
| October 17, 1987 | Tampa | United States | Sun Dome |
| October 19, 1987 | Charlotte | United States | Charlotte Coliseum |
| October 20, 1987 | Birmingham | United States | Birmingham–Jefferson Convention Complex |
| October 23, 1987 | Antioch | United States | Starwood Amphitheatre |
| October 24, 1987 | Indianapolis | United States | Market Square Arena |
| October 25, 1987 | Richfield | United States | Richfield Coliseum |
| October 27, 1987 | Norman | United States | Lloyd Noble Center |
| October 28, 1987 | Little Rock | United States | Barton Coliseum |
| October 29, 1987 | Memphis | United States | Mid-South Coliseum |
| October 30, 1987 | Biloxi | United States | Gulf Coast Coliseum |
| October 31, 1987 | Houston | United States | The Summit |
| November 1, 1987 | Dallas | United States | Reunion Arena |
Leg 2
| May 14, 1988 | Pensacola | United States | Pensacola Civic Center |
| May 15, 1988 | Tallahassee | United States | Leon County Civic Center |
| May 17, 1988 | New Orleans | United States | UNO Lakefront Arena |
| May 18, 1988 | Shreveport | United States | Hirsch Memorial Coliseum |
| May 19, 1988 | Jackson | United States | Mississippi Coliseum |
| May 21, 1988 | Lexington | United States | Rupp Arena |
| May 22, 1988 | Johnson City | United States | Freedom Hall Civic Center |
| May 23, 1988 | Knoxville | United States | Knoxville Civic Coliseum |
| May 25, 1988 | Columbia | United States | Carolina Coliseum |
| May 26, 1988 | Savannah | United States | Savannah Civic Center |
| May 28, 1988 | Orlando | United States | Orange County Convention Center |
| May 29, 1988 | Pembroke Pines | United States | Hollywood Sportatorium |
| May 31, 1988 | Chattanooga | United States | UTC Arena |
| June 1, 1988 | Roanoke | United States | Roanoke Civic Center |
| June 2, 1988 | Greensboro | United States | Greensboro Coliseum |
| June 4, 1988 | Charlotte | United States | Charlotte Memorial Stadium |
| June 5, 1988 | Atlanta | United States | Atlanta–Fulton County Stadium |
| June 7, 1988 | Cuyahoga Falls | United States | Blossom Music Center |
| June 8, 1988 | Pittsburgh | United States | Civic Arena |
| June 9, 1988 | Clarkston | United States | Pine Knob Music Theater |
| June 11, 1988 | East Troy | United States | Alpine Valley Music Theatre |
| June 12, 1988 | Thornville | United States | Buckeye Lake Music Center |
| June 15, 1988 | Bloomington | United States | Met Center |
| June 16, 1988 | Cedar Rapids | United States | Five Seasons Center |
| June 18, 1988 | Peoria | United States | Peoria Civic Center |
| June 19, 1988 | Kansas City | United States | Sandstone Center for the Performing Arts |
| June 20, 1988 | Omaha | United States | Omaha Civic Auditorium |
| June 23, 1988 | Salt Lake City | United States | Salt Palace |
| June 27, 1988 | Portland | United States | Memorial Coliseum |
| June 29, 1988 | Tacoma | United States | Tacoma Dome |
| July 1, 1988 | Sacramento | United States | Cal Expo Amphitheatre |
| July 2, 1988 | Mountain View | United States | Shoreline Amphitheatre |
| July 3, 1988 | Concord | United States | Concord Pavilion |
| August 8, 1988 | Universal City | United States | Universal Amphitheatre |
| August 16, 1988 | Costa Mesa | United States | Pacific Amphitheatre |
| August 17, 1988 | Chandler | United States | Compton Terrace |
| August 20, 1988 | Morrison | United States | Red Rocks Amphitheatre |
| August 21, 1988 | Morrison | United States | Red Rocks Amphitheatre |
| August 23, 1988 | Des Moines | United States | Veterans Memorial Auditorium |
| August 24, 1988 | St. Louis | United States | Fox Theatre |
| August 26, 1988 | Syracuse | United States | New York State Fairgrounds |
| August 27, 1988 | Manchester | United States | Riverfront Park |
| August 29, 1988 | Mansfield | United States | Great Woods Center for the Performing Arts |
| September 1, 1988 | Saratoga | United States | Saratoga Performing Arts Center |
| September 2, 1988 | Portland | United States | Cumberland County Civic Center |
| September 4, 1988 | Allentown | United States | Fairground Grandstand |
| September 6, 1988 | New York City | United States | The Ritz (Miami Project To Cure Paralysis Benefit) |
| September 7, 1988 | East Rutherford | United States | Meadowlands Arena |
| September 8, 1988 | Uniondale | United States | Nassau Coliseum |
| September 10, 1988 | Landover | United States | Capital Centre |
| September 15, 1988 | Philadelphia | United States | Spectrum |
| September 16, 1988 | Darien | United States | Lakeside Amphitheater |
| September 18, 1988 | Charleston | United States | Charleston Civic Center |
| September 22, 1988 | Trotwood | United States | Hara Arena |
| September 23, 1988 | Louisville | United States | Louisville Gardens |
| September 24, 1988 | Huntsville | United States | Von Braun Civic Center |
| September 25, 1988 | Antioch | United States | Starwood Amphitheater |

== Personnel ==
- Johnny Van Zant – vocals
- Gary Rossington – guitars
- Ed King – guitars
- Randall Hall – guitars
- Billy Powell – keyboards
- Leon Wilkeson – bass
- Artimus Pyle – drums
