= Street Survivors Tour =

1977 concert tour by Lynyrd Skynyrd

Street Survivors Tour and Tour of the Survivors
- Tour by Lynyrd Skynyrd
- Associated album: Street Survivors
- Start date: January 1, 1977 (Street Survivors Tour); October 15, 1977 (Tour of the Survivors)
- No. of shows: 60

Lynyrd Skynyrd concert chronology
- One More from the Road Tour; (1976); Street Survivors Tour and Tour of the Survivors; (1977); Lynyrd Skynyrd Tribute Tour; (1987–88)

The Tour of the Survivors was the seventh major concert tour by American Southern rock band Lynyrd Skynyrd in 1977 and their last before the 1977 plane crash that abruptly halted their touring. The tour took place in North America.

What turned out to be the final tour of the original band had the ominous title, "Tour of the Survivors", and truly was as three band members were killed in a plane crash on October 20, 1977, the day after their show on October 19, 1977, in Greenville, South Carolina, which was the fifth date of their forty-five day tour. The band was flying to the next date of its tour in Baton Rouge, Louisiana.

== Typical setlist ==
- "Workin' for MCA"
- "I Ain't the One"
- "Saturday Night Special"
- "Whiskey Rock-A-Roller"
- "That Smell"
- "Travelin' Man"
- "Ain't No Good Life"
- "Gimme Three Steps"
- "Call Me the Breeze"
- "T for Texas
- "Sweet Home Alabama
- "Free Bird"

== Tour dates ==
| Date | City | Country | Venue | References |
North America
| January 1, 1977 | San Diego | United States | San Diego Sports Arena | |
| January 2, 1977 | Long Beach | United States | Long Beach Arena | |
| January 5, 1977 | Honolulu | United States | Bladsell Arena | |
Asia
| January 14, 1977 | Tokyo | Japan | Nakano Sun Plaza | |
| January 15, 1977 | Tokyo | Japan | Nakano Sun Plaza | |
| January 16, 1977 | Tokyo | Japan | Nakano Sun Plaza | |
| January 18, 1977 | Osaka | Japan | Festival Hall | |
| January 21, 1977 | Tokyo | Japan | Nakano Sun Plaza | |
Europe
| January 27, 1977 | London | England | Rainbow Theater | |
| January 28, 1977 | London | England | Rainbow Theater | |
| January 29, 1977 | London | England | Rainbow Theater | |
| January 31, 1977 | Bristol | England | Colston Hall | |
| February 1, 1977 | Portsmouth | England | Portsmouth Guildhall | |
| February 2, 1977 | Birmingham | England | Birmingham Odeon | |
| February 3, 1977 | Sheffield | England | Sheffield Town Hall | |
| February 4, 1977 | Manchester | England | Free Trade Hall | |
| February 5, 1977 | Sheffield | England | Sheffield Town Hall | |
| February 6, 1977 | Liverpool | England | Empire Theater | |
| February 8, 1977 | Newcastle | England | Newcastle City Hall | |
| February 9, 1977 | Glasgow | Scotland | Glasgow Apollo | |
| February 10, 1977 | Glasgow | Scotland | Glasgow Apollo | |
| February 12, 1977 | Lancaster | England | Lancaster University | |
| February 13, 1977 | Leeds | England | University of Leeds | |
| February 14, 1977 | Leicester | England | De Montfort Hall | |
| February 17, 1977 | Rotterdam | Netherlands | Grote Zaal De Doelen | |
| February 20, 1977 | Zürich | Switzerland | Volkshaus | |
| February 22, 1977 | Munich | West Germany | Brienner Theater | |
| February 24, 1977 | Offenbach | West Germany | Stadthalle Offenbach | |
| February 25, 1977 | Ludwigshafen | West Germany | Pfalzbau | |
| March 1, 1977 | Hamburg | West Germany | Musikhalle | |
North America
| April 22, 1977 | Johnson City | United States | Freedom Hall Civic Center | |
| April 23, 1977 | Louisville | United States | Louisville Gardens | |
| April 24, 1977 | Dayton | United States | University of Dayton Arena | |
| April 26, 1977 | Wheeling | United States | Wheeling Civic Center | |
| April 27, 1977 | Richmond | United States | Richmond Coliseum | |
| April 29, 1977 | Charlotte | United States | Charlotte Coliseum | |
| April 30, 1977 | Fayetteville | United States | Cumberland County Memorial Arena | |
| May 11, 1977 | Columbia | United States | Carolina Coliseum | |
| May 13, 1977 | Greensboro | United States | Greensboro Coliseum | |
| May 14, 1977 | Savannah | United States | Savannah Civic Center | |
| May 15, 1977 | Dothan | United States | Dothan Civic Center | |
| May 17, 1977 | Athens | United States | Georgia Coliseum | |
| May 20, 1977 | Lexington | United States | Rupp Arena | |
| May 21, 1977 | Knoxville | United States | Knoxville Civic Coliseum | |
| May 23, 1977 | Mobile | United States | Mobile Municipal Auditorium | |
| May 24, 1977 | Columbus | United States | Columbus Municipal Auditorium | |
| June 11, 1977 | Philadelphia | United States | JFK Stadium | |
| June 12, 1977 | Charleston | United States | Charleston Civic Center | |
| June 14, 1977 | Portland | United States | Cumberland County Civic Center | |
| June 15, 1977 | Springfield | United States | Springfield Civic Center | |
| June 16, 1977 | Hempstead | United States | Nassau Veterans Memorial Coliseum | |
| June 18, 1977 | Hyannis | United States | Cape Cod Coliseum | |
| June 19, 1977 | Buffalo | United States | Rich Stadium | |
| June 26, 1977 | Denver | United States | Mile High Stadium | |
| June 27, 1977 | Salt Lake City | United States | Salt Palace | |
| July 2, 1977 | Oakland | United States | Oakland Coliseum | |
| July 3, 1977 | Tulsa | United States | Tulsa Fairgrounds Speedway | |
| July 7, 1977 | Madison | United States | Dane County Coliseum | |
| July 8, 1977 | Springfield | United States | Hammons Student Center | |
| July 10, 1977 | Chicago | United States | Soldier Field | |
| July 12, 1977 | Poughkeepsie | United States | Mid-Hudson Civic Center | |
| July 13, 1977 | Asbury Park | United States | Asbury Park Convention Hall | |
| August 24, 1977 | Fresno | United States | Selland Arena | |
| August 27, 1977 | Anaheim | United States | Anaheim Stadium | |
| August 29, 1977 | Las Vegas | United States | Aladdin Theater | |
| October 13, 1977 | Statesboro | United States | Georgia Southern College | |
Tour of the Survivors
| October 15, 1977 | Hollywood | United States | Sportatorium | |
| October 16, 1977 | St. Petersburg | United States | Bayfront Center | |
| October 18, 1977 | Lakeland | United States | Lakeland Civic Center | |
| October 19, 1977 | Greenville | United States | Greenville Memorial Auditorium | |

== Cancelled dates ==
All dates are cancelled due to the October 20th plane crash.

Date
| October 21, 1977 | Baton Rouge | United States | LSU Assembly Center |
| October 22, 1977 | Little Rock | United States | Barton Coliseum |
| October 23, 1977 | Evansville | United States | Roberts Municipal Stadium |
| October 27, 1977 | Clarksville | United States | Dunn Center |
| October 28, 1977 | Columbus | United States | St. John's Arena |
| October 29, 1977 | Kalamazoo | United States | Wings Stadium |
| October 31, 1977 | Detroit | United States | Cobo Hall |
| November 10, 1977 | New York | United States | Madison Square Garden |
| November 12, 1977 | Philadelphia | United States | The Spectrum |
| November 13, 1977 | Montreal | Canada | Forum de Montreal |
| November 14, 1977 | Toronto | Canada | Maple Leaf Gardens |
| November 16, 1977 | Syracuse | United States | Onondaga County War Memorial |
| November 17, 1977 | New Haven | United States | New Haven Coliseum |
| November 19, 1977 | Boston | United States | Boston Garden |
| November 24, 1977 | Cincinnati | United States | Riverfront Coliseum |
| November 25, 1977 | Pittsburgh | United States | Civic Auditorium |
| November 27, 1977 | Atlanta | United States | The Omni |
| November 28, 1977 | Atlanta | United States | The Omni |
| December 8, 1977 | Landover | United States | Capital Centre |

== Personnel ==
- Ronnie Van Zant – vocals
- Gary Rossington – guitars
- Allen Collins – guitars
- Steve Gaines – guitars
- Leon Wilkeson – bass
- Artimus Pyle – drums
- Billy Powell – keyboards
