= Angel Stadium =

Baseball park in Anaheim, California

- The Big A

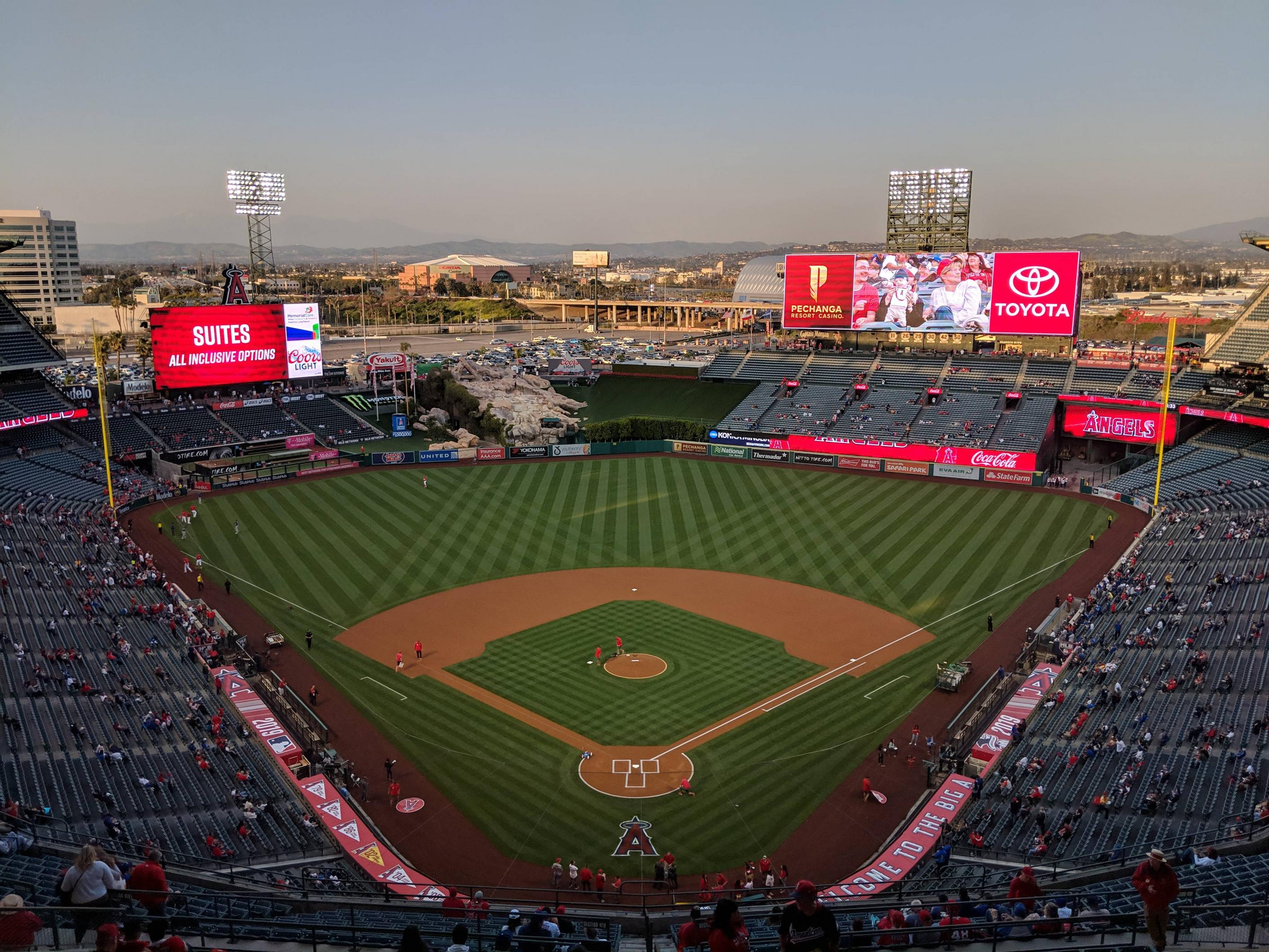
- Angel Stadium in 2019

- Location in the Greater Los Angeles area Location in California Location in the United States Location in North America
- Interactive map of Angel Stadium
- Former names: Anaheim Stadium (1966–1997); Edison International Field of Anaheim (1998–2003)
- Address: 2000 Gene Autry Way
- Location: Anaheim, California, U.S.
- Coordinates: 33°48′1″N 117°52′58″W
- Owner: City of Anaheim
- Operator: Angels Baseball LP
- Capacity: 43,250 (1966); 64,593 (Baseball—1980); 69,008 (Football—1980); 45,517 (2019–present)
- Surface: Tifway 419 Bermuda Grass
- Record attendance: Baseball: 64,406; October 5, 1982 (ALCS Game 1)
- Field size: Left Field – 347 ft (105.8 m); Left-Center – 390 ft (118.9 m); Center Field – 396 ft (120.7 m); Right-Center – 370 ft (112.8 m); Right-Center (shallow) – 365 ft (111.3 m); Right Field – 350 ft (106.7 m); Backstop – 60.5 ft (18.4 m)
- Public transit: Anaheim

Construction
- Groundbreaking: August 31, 1964; 62 years ago
- Opened: April 19, 1966; 60 years ago April 1, 1998; 28 years ago (renovations)
- Cost: US$24 million ($182 million in 2025 dollars) $118 million (1997–1999 renovations) ($217 million in 2025 dollars)
- Architects: Noble W. Herzberg and Associates (1966); HOK Sport; Robert A. M. Stern and Walt Disney Imagineering (Renovations)
- General contractors: Del E. Webb Company (1966); Turner Construction Company (Renovations)

Tenants
- Los Angeles Angels (MLB) (1966–present); Orange County Ramblers (CoFL) (1967–1968); Cal State Fullerton Titans football (NCAA) (1970–1971 and 1983); Southern California Sun (WFL) (1974–1975); Long Beach State 49ers football (NCAA) (1977–1982); California Surf (NASL) (1978–1981); Los Angeles Rams (NFL) (1980–1994); Freedom Bowl (NCAA) (1984–1994)

Website
- mlb.com/angels/ballpark

Angel Stadium (originally and colloquially known as Anaheim Stadium) is a ballpark in Anaheim, California, United States. Since its opening 60 years ago in 1966, it has been the home venue of the Los Angeles Angels of Major League Baseball (MLB), who relocated from Los Angeles to Anaheim following the 1965 season. Founded in 1961, the Angels were the first MLB team to originate in California, unlike the Los Angeles Dodgers and San Francisco Giants, who relocated from New York. The Angels played their inaugural season at Wrigley Field (Los Angeles), a now-demolished ballpark in South Los Angeles, and then at Chavez Ravine Stadium (better known as Dodger Stadium) from 1962 to 1965 before moving to Anaheim Stadium, where construction began in 1964.

The stadium also served as the home of the Los Angeles Rams of the National Football League (NFL) from 1980 to 1994.

The stadium is often referred to by its unofficial nickname The Big A, coined by Herald Examiner Sports Editor Bud Furillo. It is the fourth-oldest active ballpark in the majors, behind Fenway Park, Wrigley Field, and Dodger Stadium. The stadium hosted the MLB All-Star Game three times in 1967, 1989, and 2010, as well as the World Series in 2002.

Aside from professional baseball and football, Angel Stadium has hosted a variety of major events. These include concerts by artists such as The Who (1970), Aerosmith (1976), Pink Floyd (1977), the Rolling Stones (1978, 2002, 2005), and the Grateful Dead and Bob Dylan (1987) as one of the venues on their Dylan & the Dead tour. The stadium has also been a longtime venue for the AMA Supercross Championship, which has been held at the venue since 1976. The stadium remains one of the most iconic stops on the Supercross circuit, frequently serving as the season opener and hosting multiple rounds annually.

Religious events have also played a significant role at the stadium, including Billy Graham's evangelistic crusades and the annual Harvest Crusades led by Greg Laurie. In addition, Eid al-Fitr celebrations have drawn thousands of worshippers for morning prayers. Other events have included college and high school football games.

The stadium also houses the studios and offices of the Angels' owned and operated flagship radio station, KLAA (830 AM).

== Location and "Big A" ==
Angel Stadium and its surrounding parking lot are roughly bounded by Katella Avenue to the north, the Orange Freeway to the east, Orangewood Avenue to the south, and State College Boulevard to the west.

The landmark "Big A" sign, which originally served as a scoreboard support in left field, is located near the eastern boundary of the parking lot. The halo located near the top of the 230-foot (70 m) tall, 210-ton sign once blinked on and off after dark on game days when the Angels won (both at home and on the road) a practice broadcaster Victor Rojas was known for referring to by saying "Light that baby up!" (blinking) after a victory. The halo would remain on without blinking when they lost. Since at least the 2023 season, the halo remains lit at all times, although it shines brighter when the Angels win.

=== ARTIC (Anaheim Regional Transportation Intermodal Center) ===
ARTIC (Anaheim Regional Transportation Intermodal Center) servicing the Metrolink Orange County Line and Amtrak Pacific Surfliner, is located nearby on the other side of the State Route 57 and accessed through the Douglass Road gate at the northeast corner of the parking lot. The station provides convenient access to the stadium, the nearby Honda Center, and Disneyland from various communities along the route.

== History ==
=== Beginnings ===
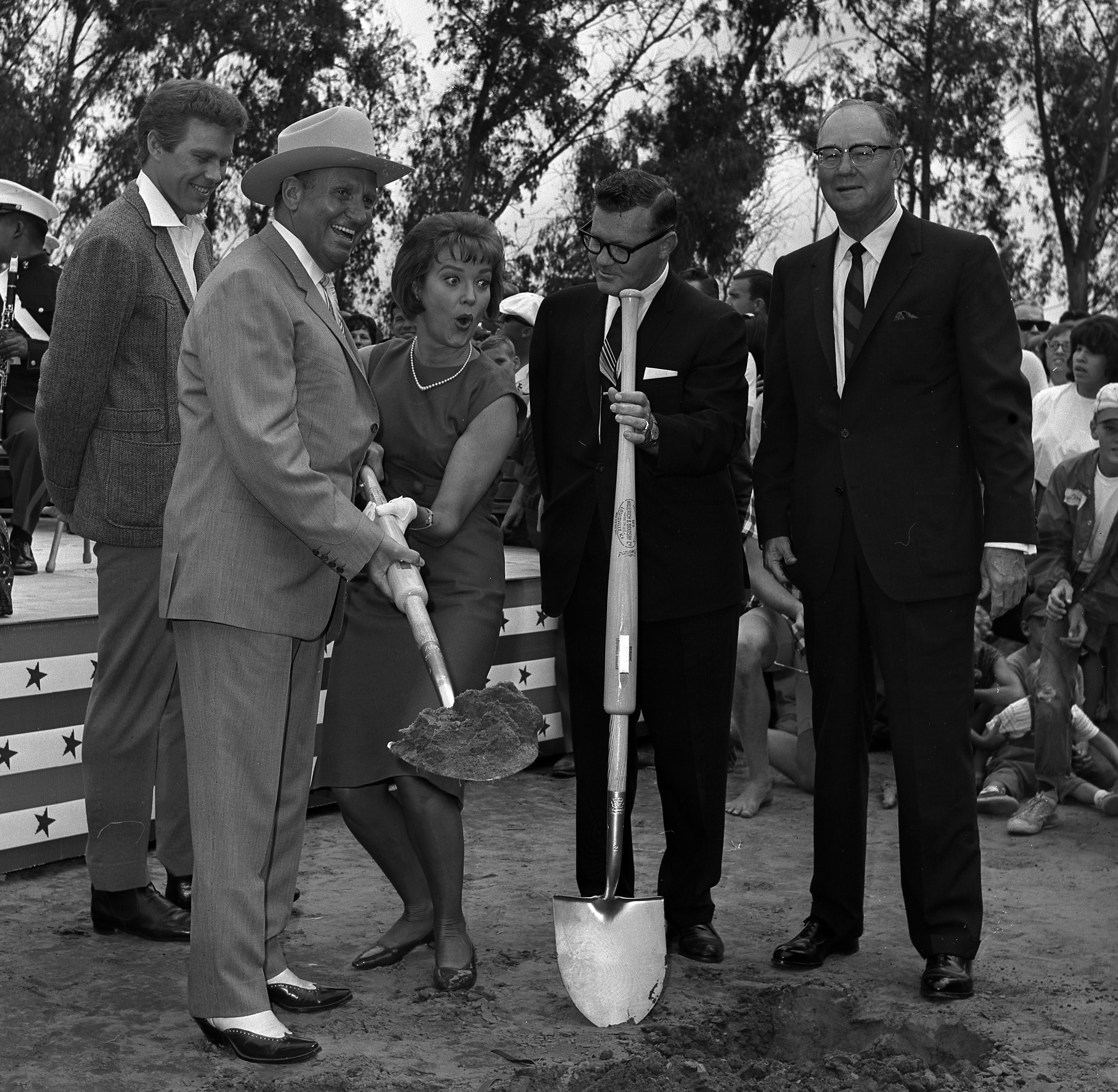
Gene Autry, actress Patrice Wymore, Odra "Chuck" Chandler (Anaheim mayor), and stadium co-developer Del Webb at the groundbreaking ceremony for Angel Stadium

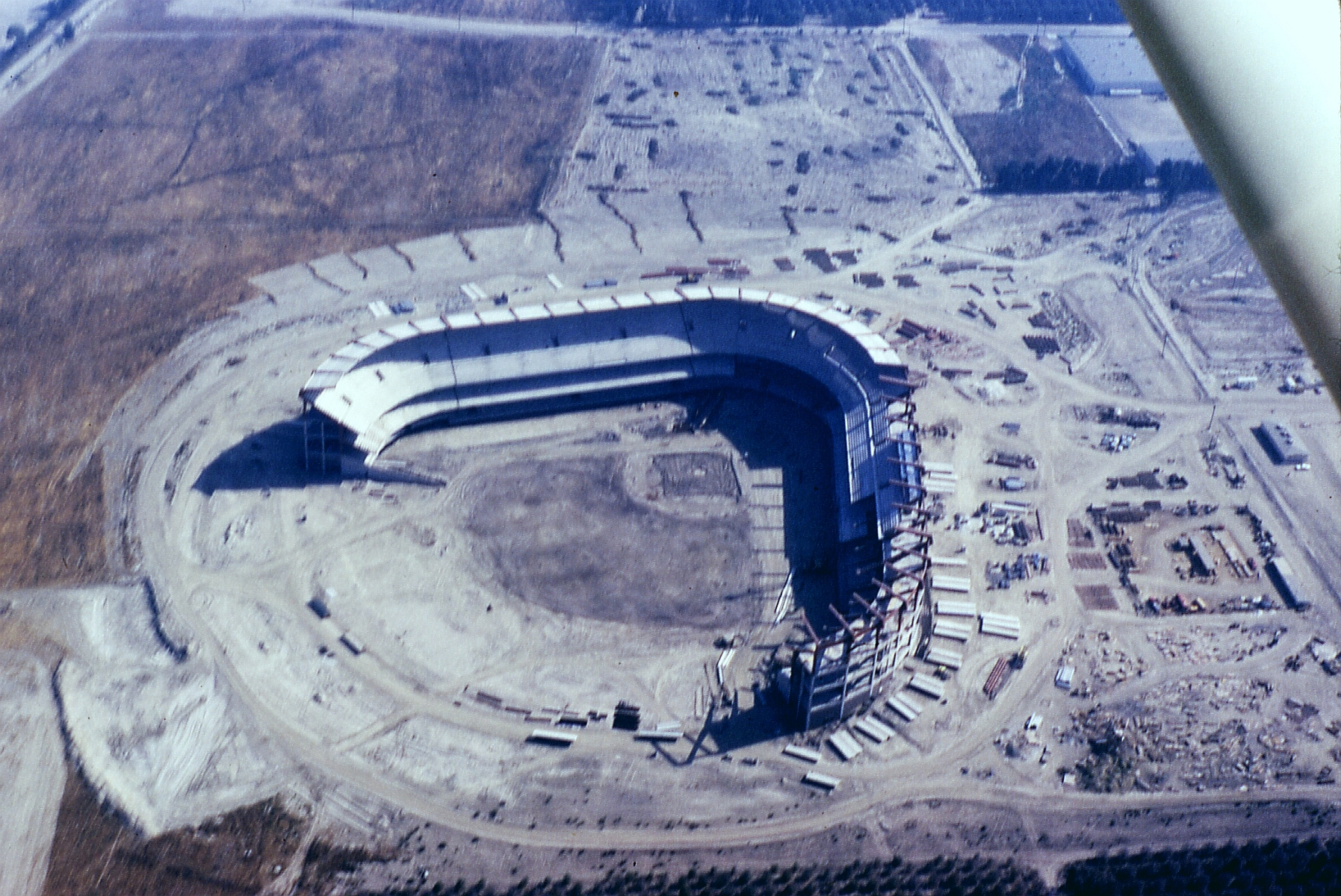
Anaheim Stadium under construction, May 1965

Angel Stadium has been the home of the Angels since their move from Los Angeles. On August 31, 1964, ground was broken for Anaheim Stadium and in 1966, the then-California Angels moved into their new home after having spent four seasons renting Dodger Stadium (referred to in Angels games as Chavez Ravine Stadium) from the Dodgers (In their inaugural season of 1961, the Angels played their home games at Los Angeles' Wrigley Field.) Originally called Anaheim Stadium when the Angels began play there in 1966, the name was changed to Edison International Field in 1997 and to Angel Stadium following the 2003 season.

The stadium was built on a parcel of about 160 acres (0.65 km^{2}) of flat land originally used for agricultural purposes by the Allec, Russell, and Knutzen families in the southeast portion of Anaheim. Consistent with many major-league sports stadiums built in the 1960s, it is located in a suburban area, though one that is host to major tourist attractions.

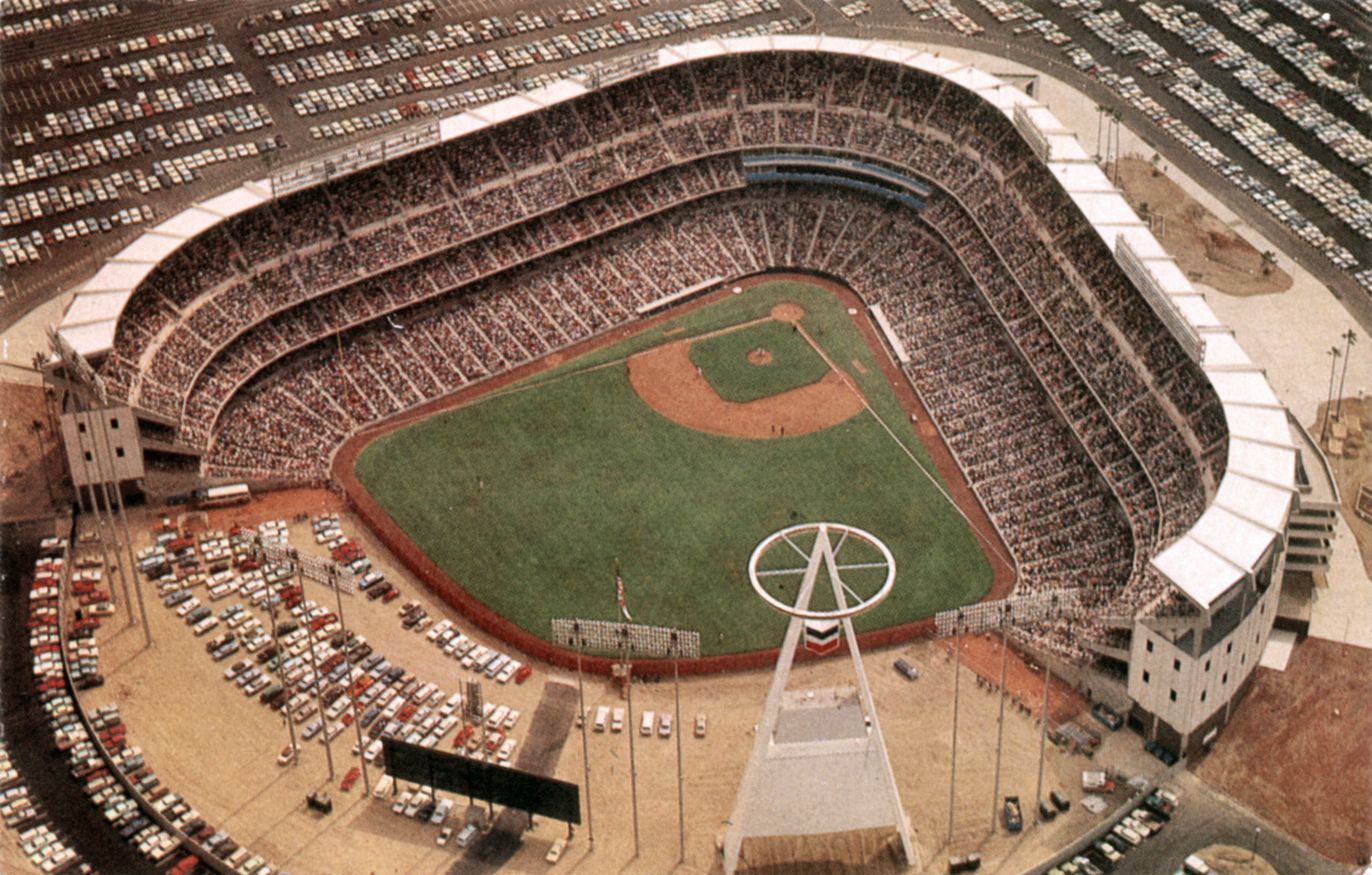
Aerial view of Anaheim Stadium c. 1967

The field dimensions (333 feet) were derived from a scientific study conducted by the Angels. Based on the air density at normal game times (1:30 pm and 8 pm), the Angels tried to formulate dimensions that were fairly balanced between pitcher, hitter, and average weather conditions. The Angels tinkered with those dimensions several times, expanding or contracting parts of the outfield by a few feet, to refine that balance. 396 feet (120.7 m) is the second shortest center-field in the American League, and tied for 4th-shortest in the major leagues with Petco Park behind only Fenway Park at 389 feet (118.6 m), Oracle Park at 391 feet (119.2 m) and Dodger Stadium at 395 ft (120.4 m). Despite this, Angels Hall of Fame pitcher Nolan Ryan still threw two of his seven no-hitters in the ballpark, alongside 2,416 of his 5,714 career strikeouts.

=== The Rams ===
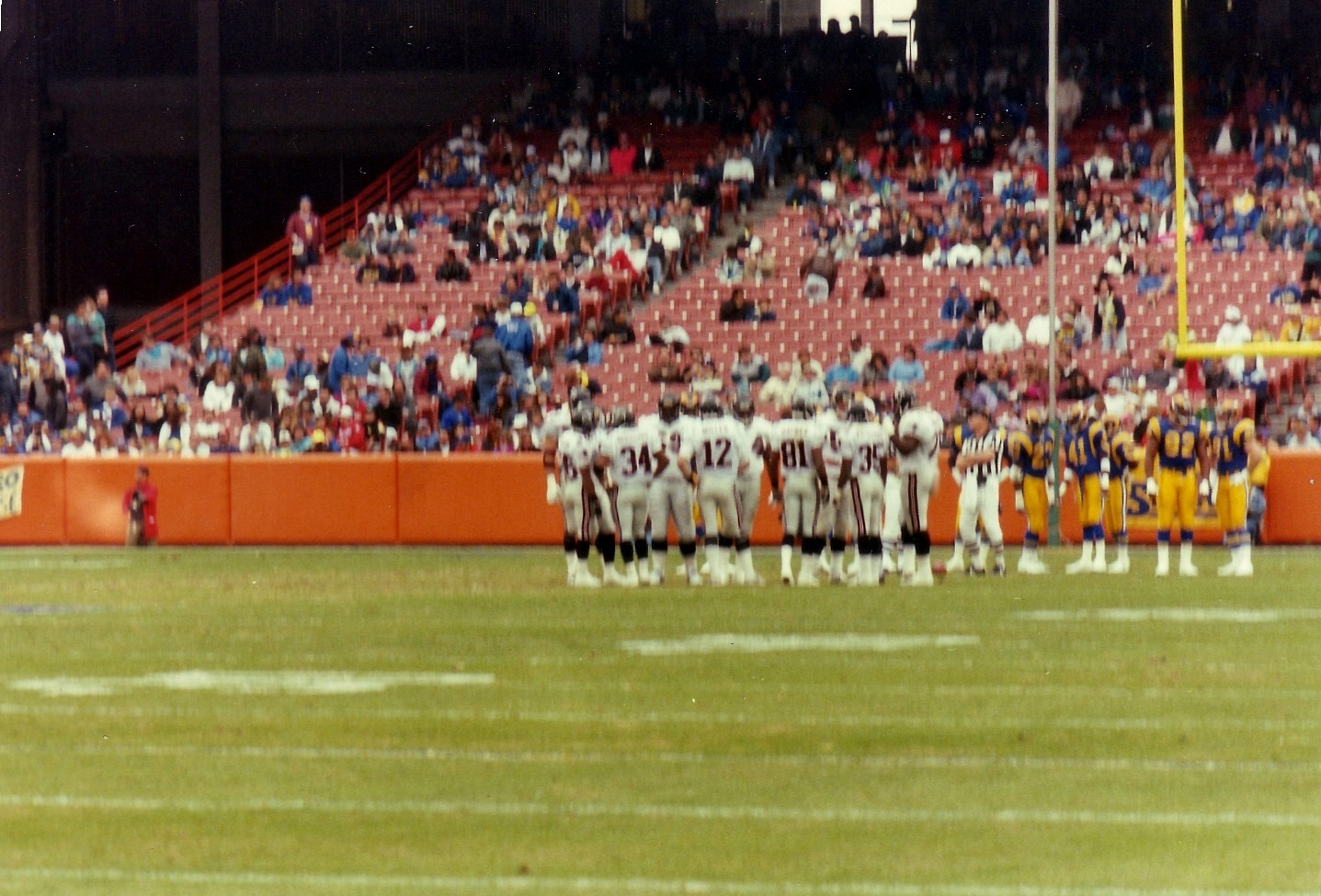
The Atlanta Falcons face the Los Angeles Rams at Anaheim Stadium, December 8, 1991

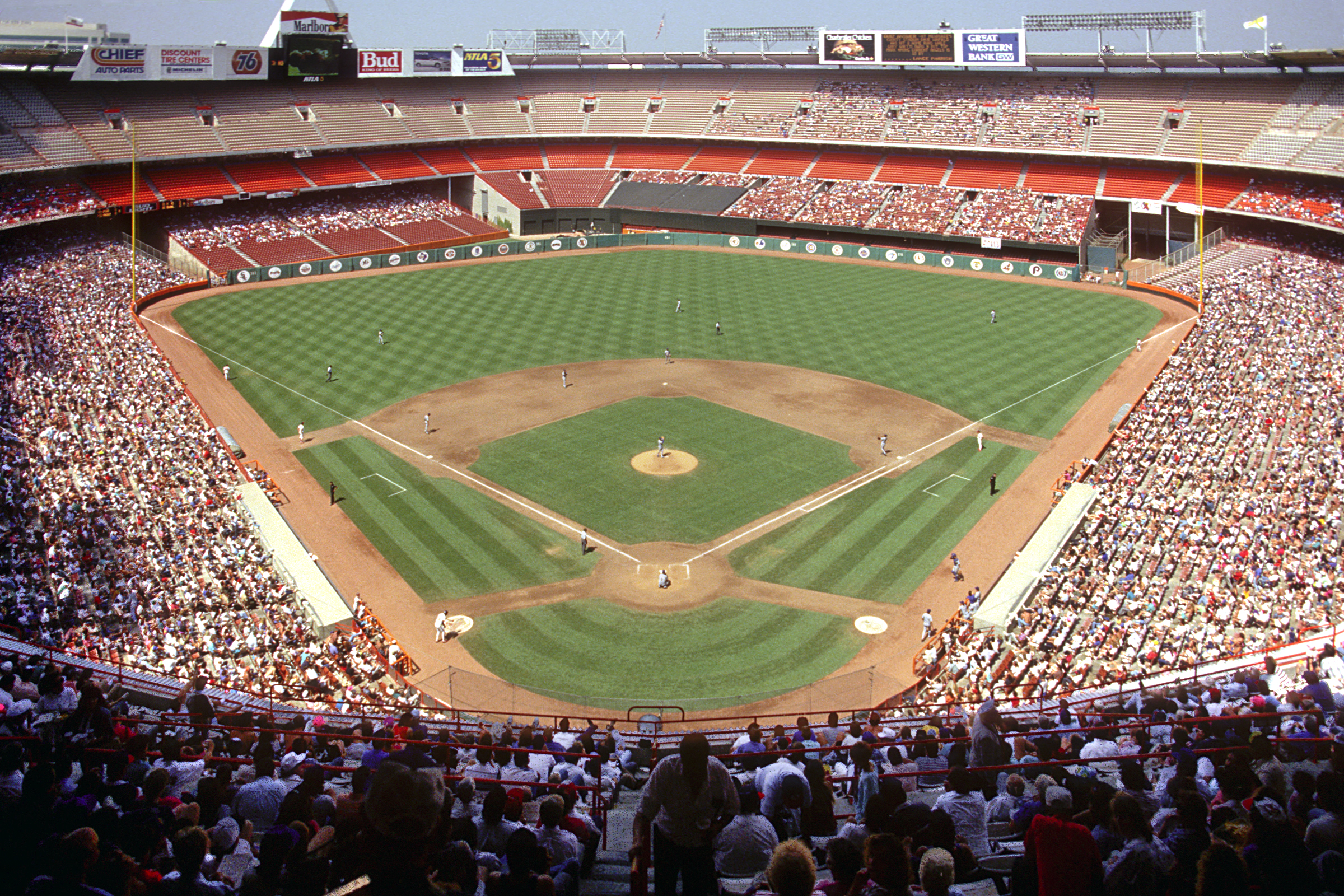
The Angels play at an enclosed Anaheim Stadium, 1991

In the late 1970s, Los Angeles Rams owner Carroll Rosenbloom was looking for a more modern venue than the Los Angeles Memorial Coliseum, and also wanted a stadium small enough to prevent Rams games from being blacked out on local television. The Coliseum seated almost 100,000 people, and the Rams had trouble filling it even in their best years. Rosenbloom eventually brokered a deal by which the Rams would move from Los Angeles to an expanded Anaheim Stadium. To add more seats (eventually about 23,000) for football games, the mezzanine and upper decks were extended completely around the playing field, resulting in a roughly trapezoidal, completely enclosed stadium. An elevated bank of bleachers was built in right and left fields, and temporary seats were placed underneath to be pulled out for football games.

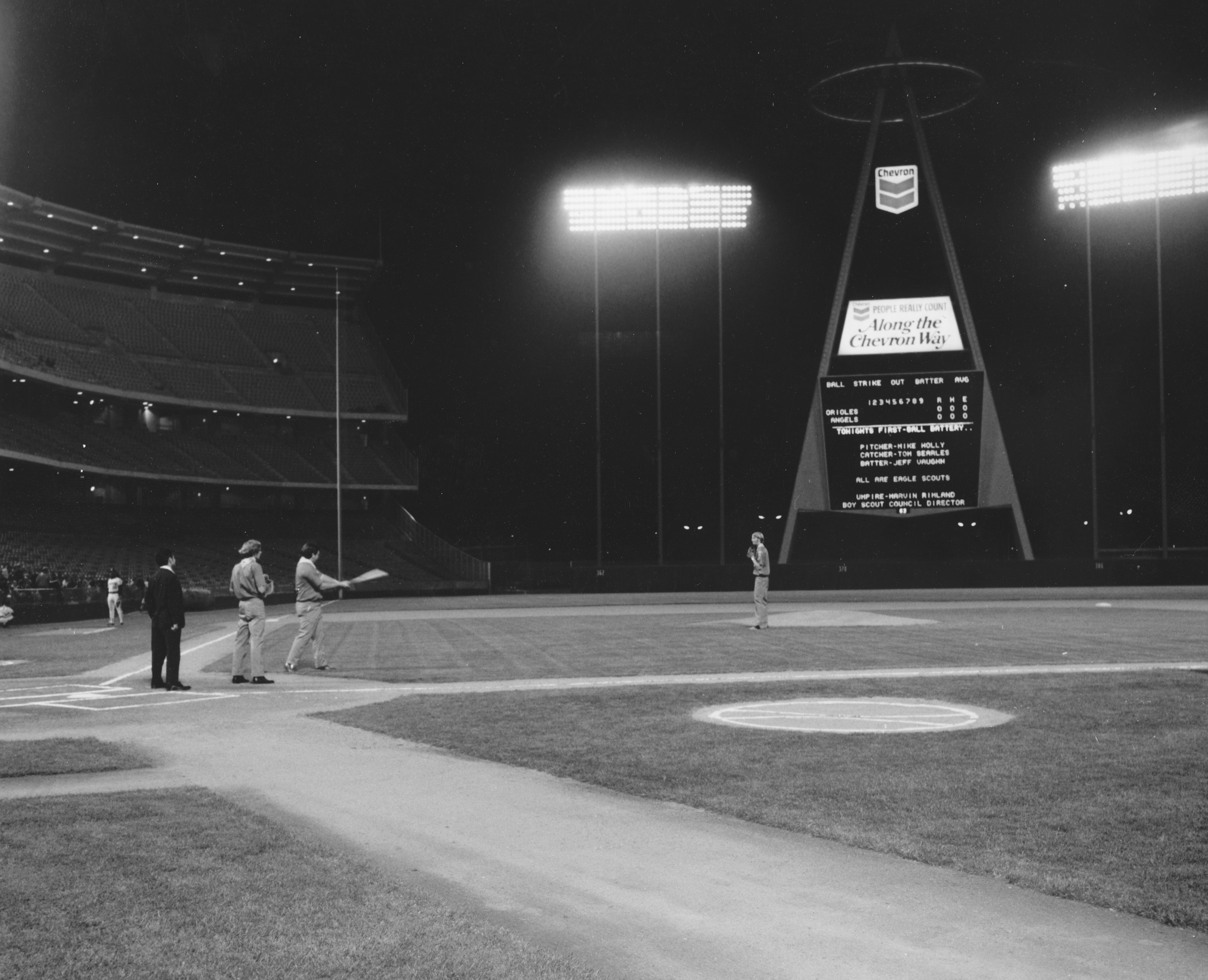
The Big A scoreboard in left centerfield, where it was located before being moved to make way for the Rams

Additionally, the Big A scoreboard support that stood in left field, and was the inspiration for the stadium's nickname, was moved 1,300 feet (395 m) to its present site in the parking lot, adjoining the Orange Freeway beyond the right-field stands; its usage changed from scoreboard to electronic marquee advertising upcoming events at the stadium. A black and amber scoreboard/instant replay video board was installed above the newly constructed upper deck seats in left field. Swift technical innovations in scoreboards in the 1980s quickly made the 1979 display obsolete, and the visual quality was washed out during day games as it was in direct sunshine, leading a Sony Jumbotron color board to replace it in 1988, alongside amber matrix displays installed above the right field upper deck and along the infield balcony. A triangular metal spire was added to the top of the Jumbotron to evoke the original emplacement of the "Big A".

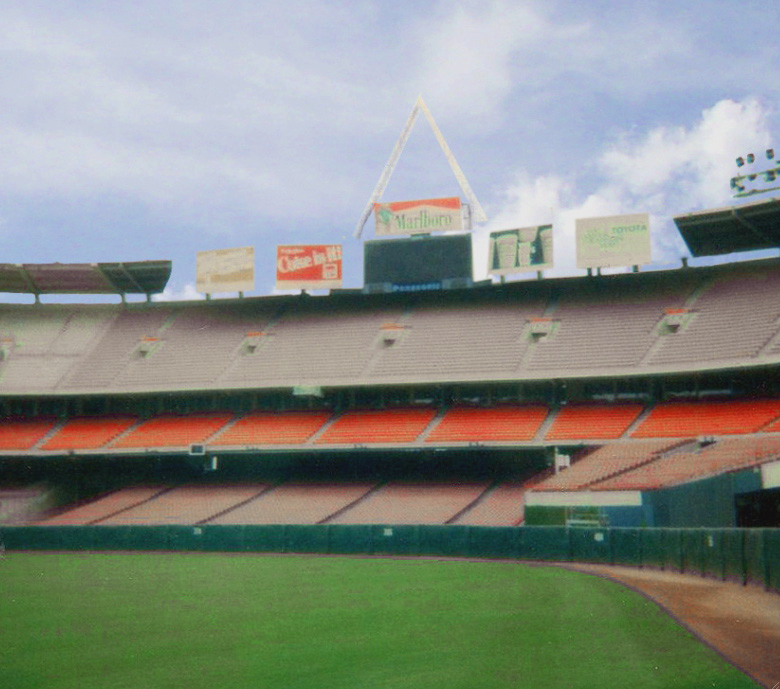
The replacement scoreboard, 1994

As with the addition of football seats to Candlestick Park a decade before to accommodate the rival San Francisco 49ers, the changes ultimately disadvantaged the Angels and their fans. Originally no seat had been further than 109 feet (33 m) from the field when first designed for baseball, but afterwards this was no longer the case. Also, while the expanded capacity allowed the Angels to set attendance records that still stand today, on most occasions even crowds of 40,000 left swaths of unusable and empty seats. It also did not completely solve the television blackout issue which inspired the Rams to move from the Coliseum, as the stadium would not sell out if the Rams weren't competitive or if the opposing team did not draw their own fans to Anaheim (be they from out of town or transplants to Southern California) to sell out the game.

The expansion was completed in time for the 1980 NFL season, and the Rams played in Anaheim Stadium from then until their move to St. Louis after the 1994 season. The Rams would later return to Los Angeles in 2016, playing their games at the Memorial Coliseum again for four seasons; the team moved into the new SoFi Stadium in Inglewood in 2020.

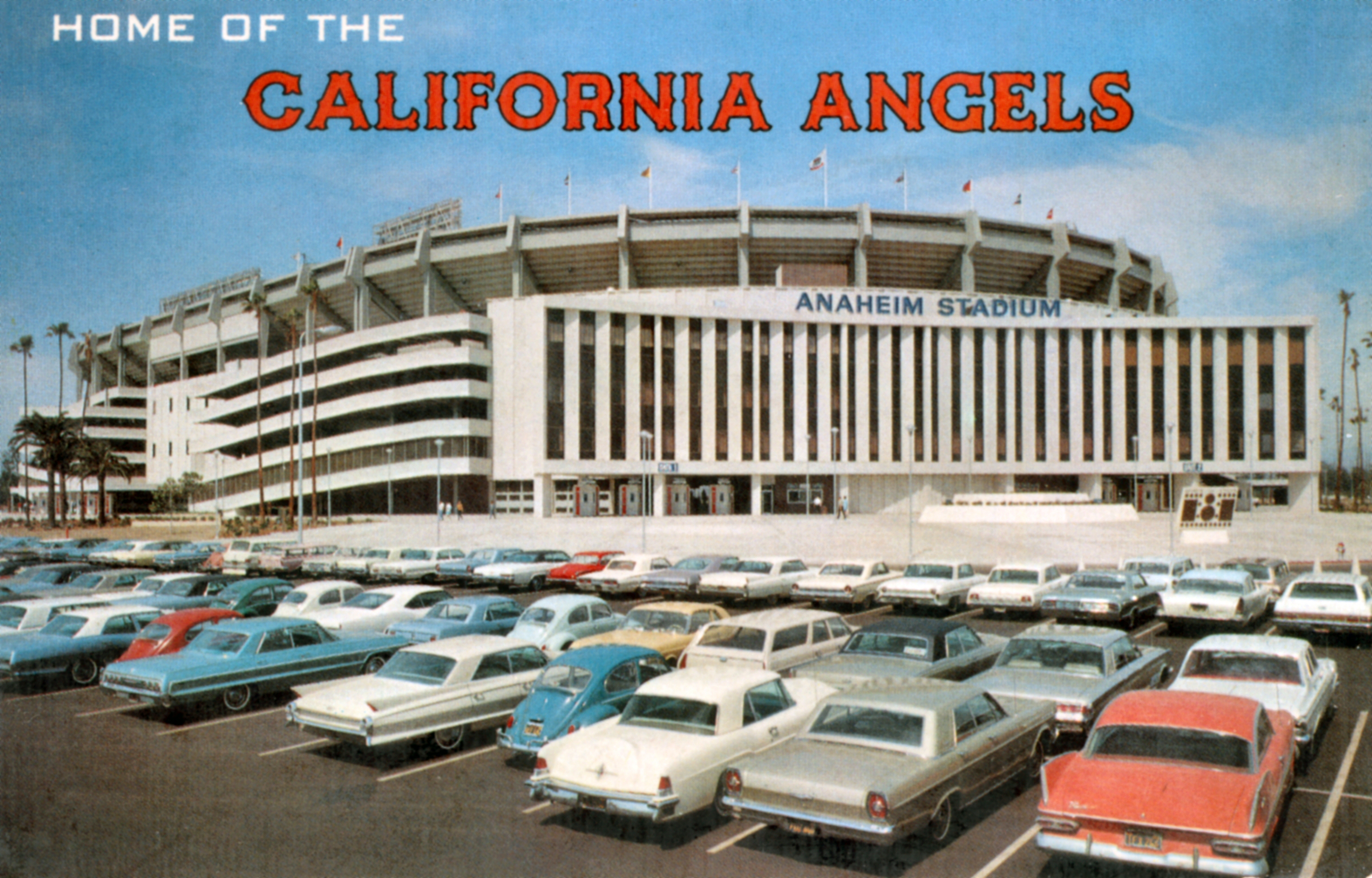
Exterior of Anaheim Stadium prior to the 1997 renovation

The January 17, 1994 Northridge earthquake on Martin Luther King Jr. Day caused the left-field Jumbotron to collapse onto the upper deck seats beneath it. As the Rams and Angels were both out of season and it occurred in the pre-dawn hours, nobody was injured. The damaged section was deconstructed and rebuilt with a new scoreboard structure and Jumbotron, eliminating the A-frame spire that evoked the Big A.

=== The Disney era ===
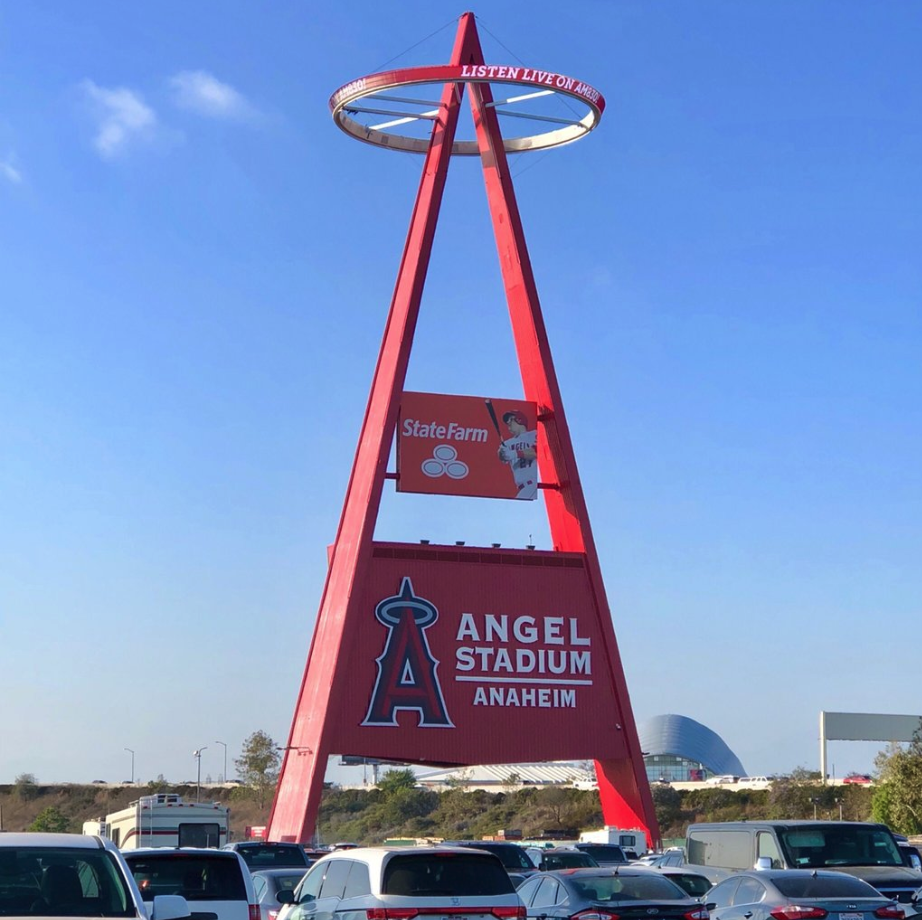
The Big A in 2018

In 1996, two years after the Rams' final game in Anaheim, The Walt Disney Company, a minority owner of the team since its inception (the stadium is located less than 3 miles (4.8 km) east of Disneyland and across from the Arrowhead Pond, the home venue of the then Disney-owned Mighty Ducks of Anaheim), gained enough support on the board to effectively take control of the team. Soon afterward, the Angels and the city of Anaheim agreed to a new deal that would keep the Angels in Anaheim until 2031, with an option to leave the facility after the 2016 season. As part of the deal, the stadium underwent an extensive renovation, returning the stadium to its original role as a baseball-only facility. Before the 1997 baseball season, the section behind the outfield wall was demolished. Disney briefly considered moving the Big A scoreboard to its original location, but decided against such a move, citing costs as well as the fact that the Big A had become a Southern California landmark in its parking lot location.

Despite the fact that much of the stadium was still a hard-hat zone, the demolition and construction being only half-completed, the Angels played their 1997 season in Anaheim. Fans were greeted by a restored view of the San Gabriel and Santa Ana Mountains, the Brea Hills, and the 57 freeway beyond the outfield.

Work that did not interfere with game play continued throughout the 1997 season, with major renovations resuming in the winter of 1997. These included the installation of outfield bleacher pavilions, a video display board and an out-of-town scoreboard below the right field seats. All of the multicolored seats were replaced by green seats. The exterior of the stadium was also renovated. The concrete structure and ramps were painted a combination of green and sandstone. Much of the façade of the stadium was torn down to create a more open feeling for visitors.

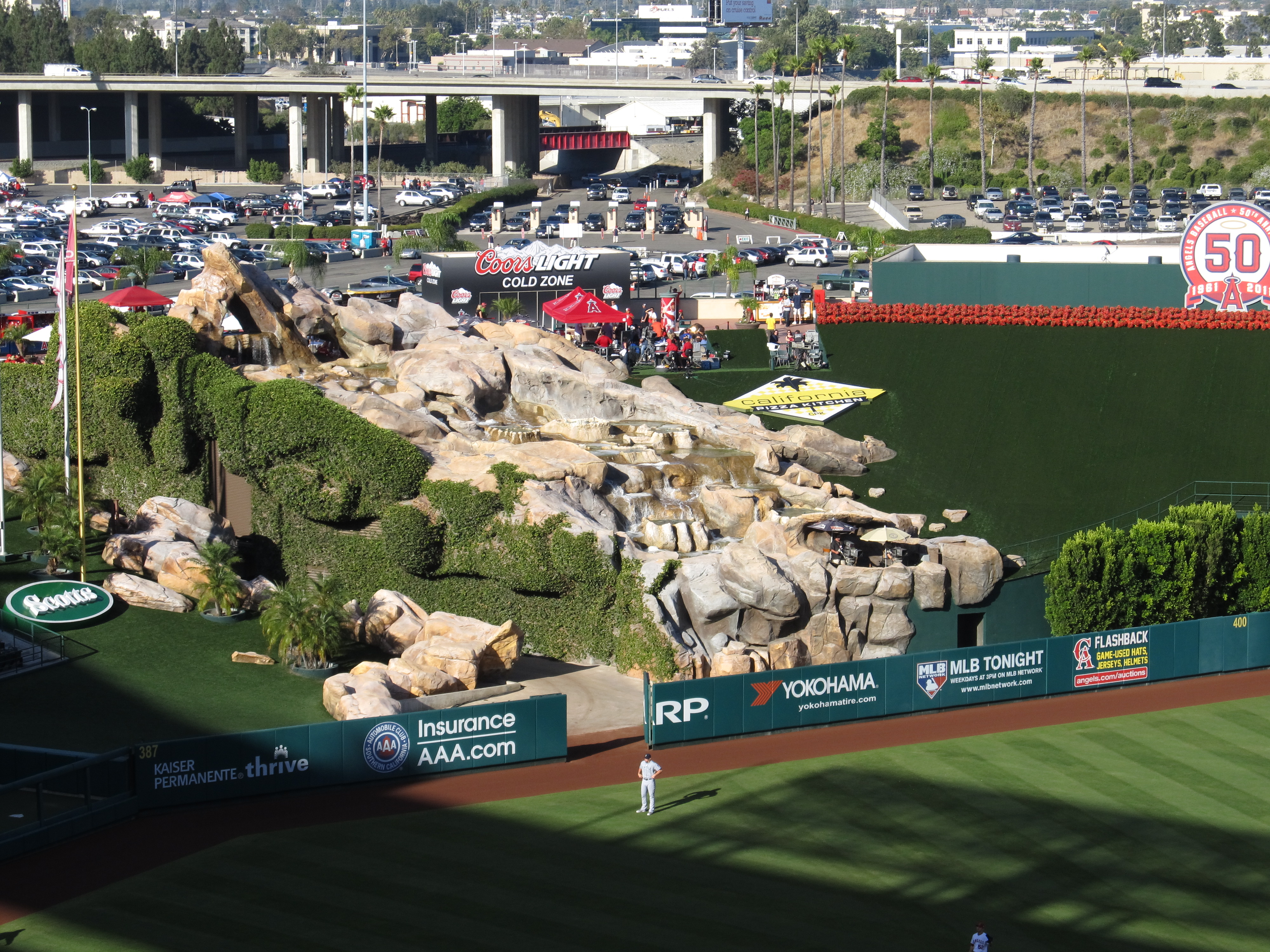
The centerfield rockpile, also known as the "California Spectacular"

The most notable feature of the entire renovation, however, was a "California Spectacular" in which geysers erupt and a stream cascades down a mountainside (Pride Rock) covered with real trees, artificial rocks behind the left-center field fence, and new bullpens. Fireworks shoot out of the display at the start of games, after every Angel home run and after every Angel win (previously they had been shot off from a parking garage).

The field dimensions of the renovated stadium became somewhat asymmetrical, with the 8-foot (2.4 m) high fence in right center field (which earlier hid the football-only bleacher section) replaced by a 19-foot (5.8 m) high wall which contains a scoreboard displaying out-of-town scores of other games. A plaza was built around the perimeter of the stadium, and inside are statues depicting longtime Angel owner and chairman Gene Autry and Michelle Carew, daughter of former Angel Rod Carew, who died of leukemia at the age of 18.

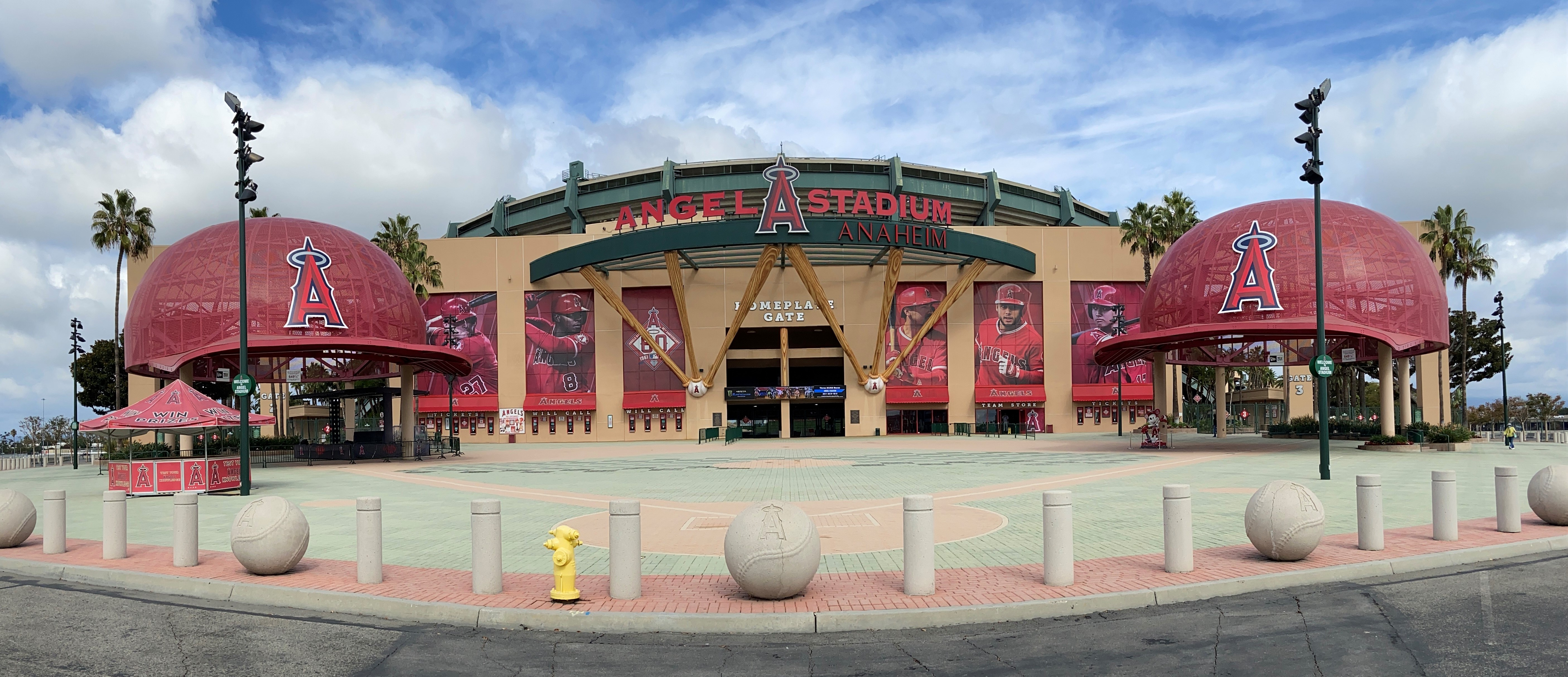
Angel Stadium's exterior

The main entrance includes two giant Angels hats complete with New Era tags on the sweatband (including one indicating the hats' size: 649½). The hats were originally blue and featured the Angels' "winged" logo designed by Disney for the 1997 season, and were repainted red and decorated with the present-day halo insignia for the 2002 season. Also outside home plate gate is a full-sized brick infield complete with regulation pitcher's mound and lighted bases, with bricks at each player position engraved with the names of Angels players who played at that position on Opening Day of each season since the Angels began play in 1961. For a fee, the green infield bricks can be engraved with fans' names or personalized messages. The Angels opened their "new" stadium on April 1, 1998, with a 4–1 victory over the New York Yankees. The renovated stadium has 5,075 club seats and 78 luxury suites.

In 1998, the stadium was renamed Edison International Field of Anaheim after local utility Edison International reached a deal giving it naming rights over the stadium for 20 years, and during this time, the stadium was referred to as the "Big Ed". However, after the 2003 season, Edison International exercised its option to exit the sponsorship deal. On December 29, 2003, the Angels announced that from then on the stadium would be known as Angel Stadium (in full, Angel Stadium of Anaheim); Disney sold the Angels around this time as well.

=== Video improvements and cancelled sale ===
In 2009, Daktronics installed light emitting diode (LED) displays at the stadium. The largest video display measures 41 ft (12.50 m) high by 67 ft (20.42 m) wide. Two smaller displays flank the large display, and a field-level display sits in the centerfield fence.

During the 2017-2018 offseason, the Angels upgraded the existing video boards in left and right field. The new left field video board measures 5,488 sq ft (509.9 m^{2}), while the new right field board measures 9,500 sq ft (880 m^{2}), the fourth largest scoreboard in MLB. In addition to this, the out of town scoreboard was upgraded, new video ribbons stretch from foul pole to foul pole, and a new sound system was added. Because of the new out of town scoreboard, the Angels moved the home run line in right field down from 18 feet (5.5 m) to 8 feet (2.4 m), though the height of the right field wall remains the same.

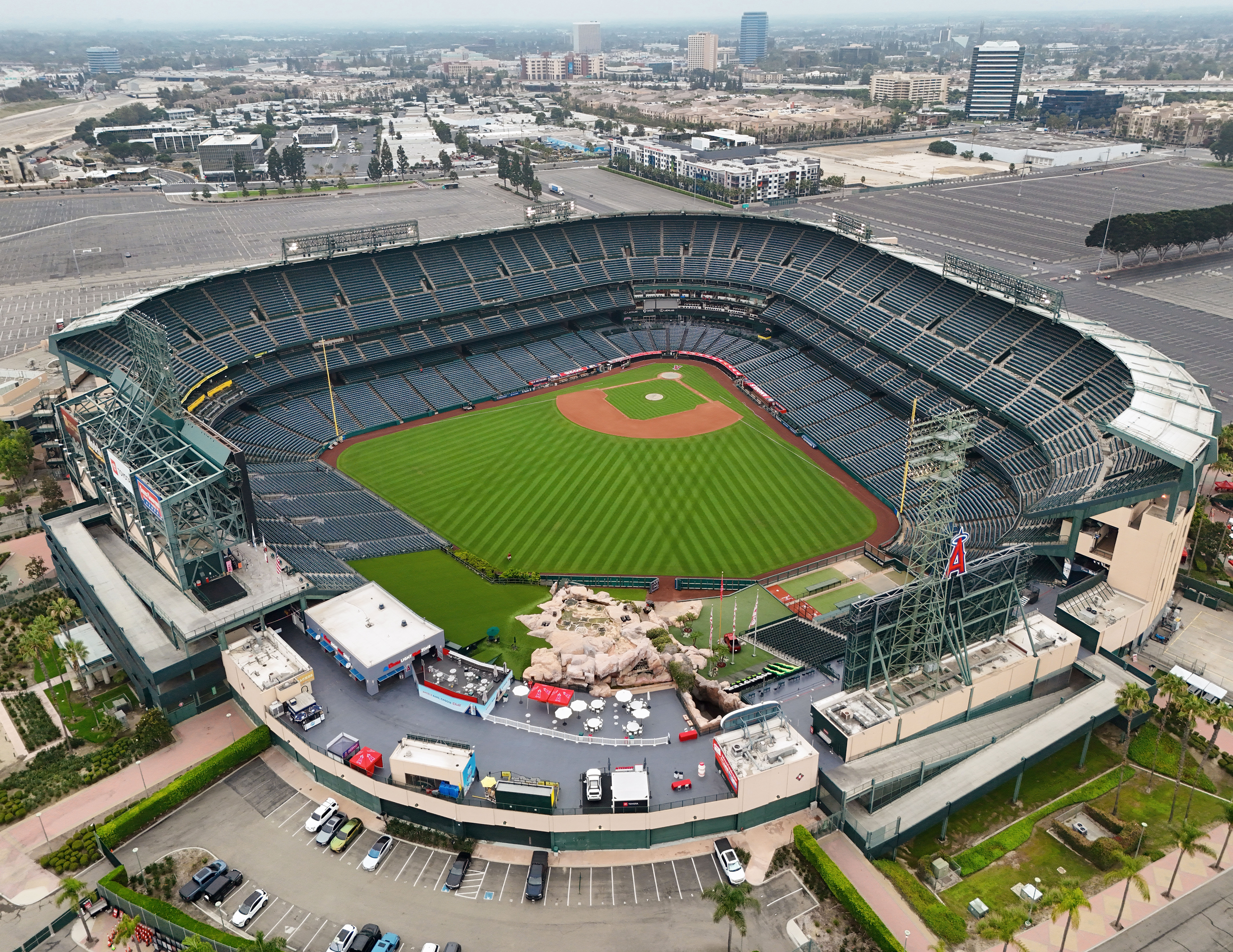
Aerial view of Angel Stadium in August 2025

The Angels opted out of their lease in October 2018, largely to avoid a contractual provision which would have forced them to remain in the stadium until 2029, though the club then had no new stadium proposals or moving plans. In December 2019, the city of Anaheim agreed to sell the stadium and surrounding land to an Arte Moreno-affiliated management company for $325 million, with the team committed to remain in Anaheim until at least 2050, with options to remain until at least 2065. The deal, made behind closed doors, has led to allegations of corruption and violations of the state's Surplus Land Act. An ongoing FBI investigation into the city's internal affairs and the stadium sale eventually led to the resignation of Anaheim mayor Harry Sidhu on May 23, 2022, putting the stadium's pending sale into question. On May 24, 2022, the Anaheim City Council voted to cancel the sale to Moreno's SRB Management, in light of the corruption probe. On February 6, 2025, the Angels extended their lease until 2032.

== Seating capacity ==
Baseball
Years	Capacity
1966–1978	43,202
1979	43,250
1980–1985	65,158
1986–1987	64,573
1988–1996	64,593
1997	33,851
1998–2005	45,050
2006–2007	45,262
2008–2009	45,281
2010–2011	45,389
2012	45,957
2013–2014	45,483
2015	45,957
2016	45,493
2017–2018	45,477
2019–present	45,517

Football
Years	Capacity
1980–1994	69,008

Angel Stadium - Schematic View

== Notable events ==
=== Baseball ===
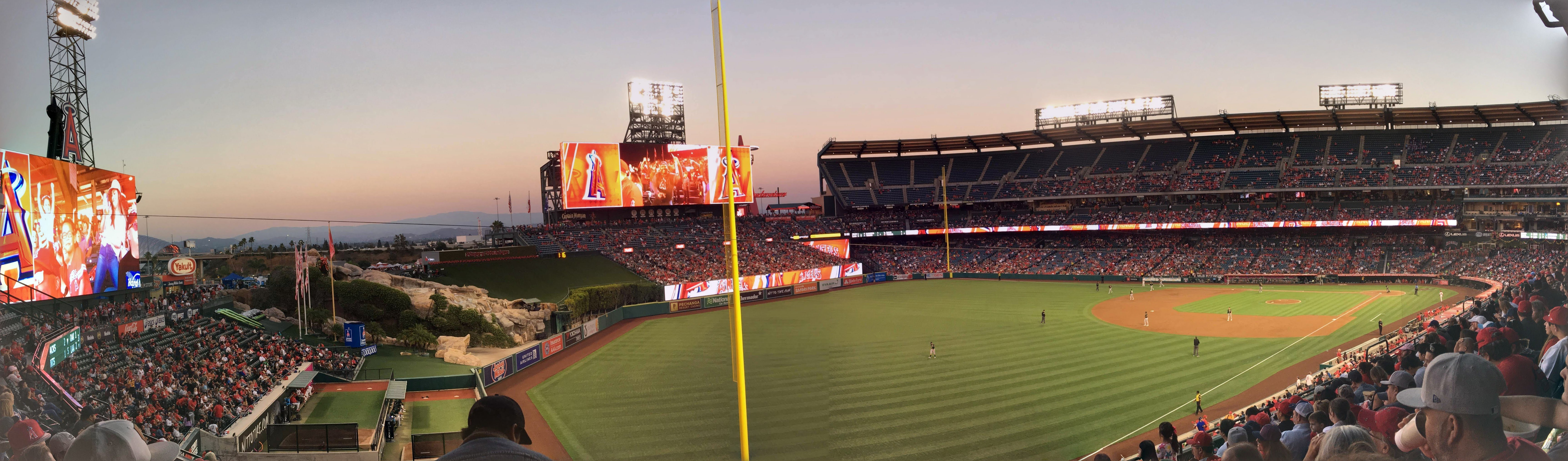
Angel Stadium in 2019

The stadium was host to the 1967 MLB All-Star Game, the first All-Star Game to be played on prime-time television. This was the first time an All-Star Game was held at night since World War II. Angel Stadium again hosted All-Star Games in 1989 and 2010.

It hosted seven American League Division Series (2002, 2004, 2005, 2007, 2008, 2009, and 2014) and six American League Championship Series (1979, 1982, 1986, 2002, 2005, and 2009). Most notably, it hosted the 2002 World Series, which the Angels won over the San Francisco Giants.

Angel Stadium hosted several games during Round 2 of the 2006 World Baseball Classic.

On Saturday, August 9, 2014, the stadium hosted its longest game ever, a 6-hour, 31-minute game between the Angels and the Boston Red Sox that extended for 19 innings, before Albert Pujols gave the Angels a 5-4 win.

Famous individual baseball milestones attained in the stadium include Mickey Mantle's final game-winning home run, Nolan Ryan's record of striking out nine consecutive Boston Red Sox players (and two of his seven career no-hitters), Reggie Jackson's 500th home run, Rod Carew's 3,000th hit, Don Sutton's 300th win, Vladimir Guerrero's 400th home run, George Brett's 3,000th hit, and Albert Pujols' 600th home run.

More recently, Shohei Ohtani achieved multiple unprecedented feats at Angel Stadium. In the 2021 season, he became the first player since Babe Ruth in 1919 to hit 30 or more home runs while making at least 10 pitching appearances in the same season. That same year, he became the first player in MLB history to be selected to the All-Star Game as both a pitcher and a hitter in the same season. On June 27, 2023, Ohtani became the first American League player since 1961 to hit two home runs and record 10 or more strikeouts in the same game. In the 2022 season, Ohtani became the first player in AL and NL history to record 30 home runs at the plate and 10 wins on the mound in a single season. Additionally, in 2021, he became the first player in MLB history to record 30 home runs and 100 strikeouts as a pitcher in a single season, all while playing home games in Anaheim.

The Savannah Bananas, an exhibition baseball team known for their on-field entertainment, played two sold out games at Angel Stadium on May 30 and 31 as part of their 2025 tour.

=== Football ===
In 1971, Angel Stadium hosted the Mercy Bowl, a charity bowl game between Cal State Fullerton and Fresno State. 16,854 attended the game, raising over $50,000 for the surviving families of those impacted by a plane crash on November 13, 1971.

A "Battle of the Bell" game between Fountain Valley High School and Edison High School was hosted in the stadium sometime during the 1970s.

The Rams' Eric Dickerson broke the NFL single-season rushing record in game 15 of the 1984 season at Angel Stadium, finishing the game with 2,007 yards accumulated on the season. Dickerson went on to record 2,105 total yards in 1984.

In December 2017, the Philadelphia Eagles used Angel Stadium as their practice field, as part of the Eagles' two-game West Coast road trip.

=== Soccer ===
Anaheim Stadium hosted five group stage matches of the 1996 CONCACAF Gold Cup, including two involving the United States national team.

Date	Winning Team	Result	Losing Team	Tournament	Spectators
January 10, 1996	Canada	3–1	Honduras	1996 CONCACAF Gold Cup First Round	27,125
January 10, 1996	El Salvador	3–2	Trinidad and Tobago	1996 CONCACAF Gold Cup First Round	27,125
January 13, 1996	United States	3–2	Trinidad and Tobago	1996 CONCACAF Gold Cup First Round	12,425
January 16, 1996	Guatemala	3–0	Saint Vincent and the Grenadines	1996 CONCACAF Gold Cup First Round	52,345
January 16, 1996	United States	2–0	El Salvador	1996 CONCACAF Gold Cup First Round	52,345

=== Concerts ===
Angel Stadium has hosted concerts including bands such as The Rolling Stones, The Who, David Bowie, U2, The Osmonds, Pink Floyd, Alice Cooper, Bob Dylan, The Grateful Dead, Madonna, the Eagles, Jackson Browne, Linda Ronstadt, and Toots and the Maytals.

Date	Artist	Opening act(s)	Tour / Concert name	Attendance / Capacity	Revenue	Notes
June 14, 1970	The Who	Blues Image; Leon Russell; John Sebastian	Tommy Tour	—	—	
September 8, 1972	The Osmonds	The Heywoods	1972 US Tour	29,832 / 60,000	—	
September 11, 1972	The Osmonds	—	1972 US Tour	—	—	Their second performance at the stadium that month.
May 23, 1975	The Beach Boys; Chicago	Honk	Beachago '75	—	—	
August 30, 1975	Rod Stewart; Faces	Loggins and Messina; Fleetwood Mac	Sunshine Festival	—	—	
September 28, 1975	Eagles	Jackson Browne; Linda Ronstadt; Toots and the Maytals	Sunshine Festival	—	—	
March 21, 1976	The Who	The Steve Gibbons Band; Little Feat; Rufus featuring Chaka Khan	The Who by Numbers Tour	—	—	
July 3, 1976	The Beach Boys	Santana; America	15 Big Ones Tour	—	—	
July 6, 1977	Peter Frampton	The J. Geils Band; Foghat; Rick Derringer	I'm in You Tour	—	—	
July 17, 1976	Yes	Peter Frampton, Gary Wright, Gentle Giant	1976 Solo Albums Tour	—	—	Hosted by Flo & Eddie
August 7, 1976	ZZ Top	Blue Öyster Cult; Johnny & Edgar Winter	Worldwide Texas Tour	49,169 / 60,000	$498,040	
August 20, 1976	Kiss	Bob Seger & the Silver Bullet Band; Ted Nugent; Montrose	Destroyer Tour	42,000+	—	
September 10, 1976	Aerosmith	Jeff Beck	Rocks Tour	—	—	
September 12, 1976	Aerosmith	Jeff Beck	Rocks Tour	—	—	
May 6, 1977	Pink Floyd	—	In the Flesh Tour	—	—	
May 7, 1977	Pink Floyd	—	In the Flesh Tour	—	—	
June 19, 1977	Alice Cooper	Nazareth; The Tubes & Sha Na Na	King of the Silver Screen Tour	—	—	
August 27, 1977	Lynyrd Skynyrd; Ted Nugent	Foreigner; REO Speedwagon; Rex	Street Survivors Tour	57,000	—	This was one of Lynyrd Skynyrd's final concerts with the original band before the tragic plane crash.
July 23, 1978	The Rolling Stones	—	Some Girls Tour	—	—	
July 24, 1978	The Rolling Stones	The Outlaws	Some Girls Tour	—	—	
August 26, 1978	Electric Light Orchestra	Journey; Kingfish; Trickster	The Big Night Tour	50,000	-	Actor Tony Curtis introduced ELO. Before the show, a small plane flashed "ELO - The Big Night" across the sky.
September 23, 1978	Boston	Black Sabbath; Van Halen; Sammy Hagar	Summerfest 1978 / Don't Look Back Tour / Never Say Die! Tour	57,000	$700,000	This concert was part of KMET 94.7 Summerfest which combined the Boston and Black Sabbath tours.
October 26, 1980	Merle Haggard; Willie Nelson	Alabama; Emmylou Harris	Country Fall Festival	30,000	—	Haggard’s performance was recorded and released in the 1981 album Rainbow Stew: Live at Anaheim Stadium.
July 17, 1982	Foreigner	Loverboy; Scorpions; Iron Maiden	Summer Strut	73,351 / 73,351	$1,100,265	
September 9, 1983	David Bowie	The Go-Go's; Madness	Serious Moonlight Tour	—	—	
July 18, 1987	Madonna	Level 42; Bhundu Boys; Hue and Cry	Who's That Girl World Tour	62,986 / 62,986	$1,417,185	
July 26, 1987	Bob Dylan; The Grateful Dead	—	Alone and Together Tour	—	—	Three songs from the Bob Dylan set appear on the live album Dylan & the Dead. Selections from the two Grateful Dead sets appear on the album View from the Vault IV.
August 8, 1987	David Bowie	Siouxsie and the Banshees	Glass Spider Tour	50,000	—	
August 9, 1987	David Bowie	Siouxsie and the Banshees	Glass Spider Tour	—	—	
July 17, 1990	Anita Baker	—	Compositions Tour	—	—	
November 14, 1992	U2	The Sugarcubes; Public Enemy	Zoo TV Tour	48,640 / 48,640	$1,462,800	
April 17, 1993	Paul McCartney	—	The New World Tour	48,560 / 48,560	$1,698,410	
June 13, 1998	NSYNC	—	NSYNC in Concert	—	—	This concert was a part of Wango Tango
November 2, 2002	The Rolling Stones	Sheryl Crow	Licks Tour	—	—	
May 14, 2005	Kelly Clarkson	Graham Colton Band	Breakaway World Tour	—	—	This concert was a part of Wango Tango
November 4, 2005	The Rolling Stones	Toots and the Maytals	A Bigger Bang Tour	48,480 / 48,480	$6,792,416	
June 17, 2011	U2	Lenny Kravitz	U2 360° Tour	105,955 / 105,955	$10,790,140	
June 18, 2011	U2	Lenny Kravitz	U2 360° Tour	105,955 / 105,955	$10,790,140	
July 14, 2012	Kenny Chesney; Tim McGraw	Grace Potter and the Nocturnals; Jake Owen	Brothers of the Sun Tour	44,832 / 44,832	$3,963,039	
July 27, 2013	Kenny Chesney; Eric Church	Eli Young Band; Kacey Musgraves	No Shoes Nation Tour	41,447 / 41,447	$3,538,806	
September 9, 2017	Chance the Rapper	—	Be Encouraged Tour	—	—	These concerts were part of the Day N Night Festival.
September 9, 2017	SZA	—	Ctrl the Tour	—	—	These concerts were part of the Day N Night Festival.

=== Motion picture set ===
Several major motion pictures have been shot at Angel Stadium. The final sequence of crime comedy film The Naked Gun: From the Files of Police Squad! (1988) featured an electronically manipulated Reggie Jackson of the California Angels trying to shoot Queen Elizabeth II. Exteriors were shot at the ballpark, but most baseball scenes were shot at Dodger Stadium. The 1988 sci-fi comedy My Stepmother Is an Alien features a scene shot in Angel Stadium of Kim Basinger speaking to an extraterrestrial counsel. The 1990 comedy Taking Care of Business featured a World Series matchup between the Angels and the Chicago Cubs, with the baseball scenes in the movie having been filmed in the stadium. The Disney remake of Angels in the Outfield (1994) prominently uses the ballpark; however, many of the interior shots were filmed at the Oakland–Alameda County Coliseum. The stadium served as a stand-in for Candlestick Park in filming of The Fan (1996). Scenes from Deuce Bigalow: Male Gigolo and Air Bud: Seventh Inning Fetch were also filmed here.

=== Other events ===
On November 16, 1979, Anaheim Stadium hosted motorcycle speedway, when it was the venue for the American Final, a qualifying round for the 1980 edition of the Speedway World Championship. Bruce Penhall won the American Final from Scott Autrey and Dennis Sigalos. Penhall and Autrey qualified to the Intercontinental Final in England held over 6 months later. Penhall qualified through to his first World Final held at the Ullevi Stadium in Gothenburg, Sweden where he finished in 5th place.

Anaheim Stadium has hosted an AMA Supercross Championship round from 1976 to 1979, 1981 to 1987, 1989 to 1996, and 1999 to the present.

The stadium is also host to Monster Jam, which hosts several shows every year.

Angel Stadium has been the site of annual Christian Harvest Crusades since 1990. It has also hosted Muslim Eid el Fitr celebrations. In 2014, Barack Obama gave a commencement speech for University of California, Irvine graduates, which was held at the stadium due to capacity and security concerns.

Angel Stadium holds an annual 5K run whose course runs through the stadium and around its parking lot.

== Regular season home attendance ==
Home attendance at Angel Stadium
Year	Total attendance	Game average	MLB rank
2002	2,305,565	28,463	16th
2003	3,061,094	37,791	5th
2004	3,375,677	41,675	3rd
2005	3,404,686	42,033	4th
2006	3,406,790	42,059	5th
2007	3,365,632	41,551	5th
2008	3,336,744	41,194	6th
2009	3,240,374	40,004	5th
2010	3,250,816	40,133	5th
2011	3,166,321	39,090	5th
2012	3,061,770	37,799	7th
2013	3,019,505	37,277	7th
2014	3,095,935	38,221	5th
2015	3,012,765	37,194	5th
2016	3,016,142	37,236	7th
2017	3,019,583	37,278	7th
2018	3,020,216	37,286	6th
2019	3,023,010	37,321	5th
2020	No fans in attendance (Note: No fans were allowed at games during the 2020 Major League Baseball regular season due to the COVID-19 pandemic and a gatherings ban ordered by California Governor Gavin Newsom.)	N/A	N/A
2021	1,512,033 (Note: Angel Stadium operated at 33% capacity From April to June 17 due to the COVID-19 pandemic.)	18,667	16th
2022	2,457,461	30,339	13th
2023	2,640,575	32,599	13th

== Gallery ==
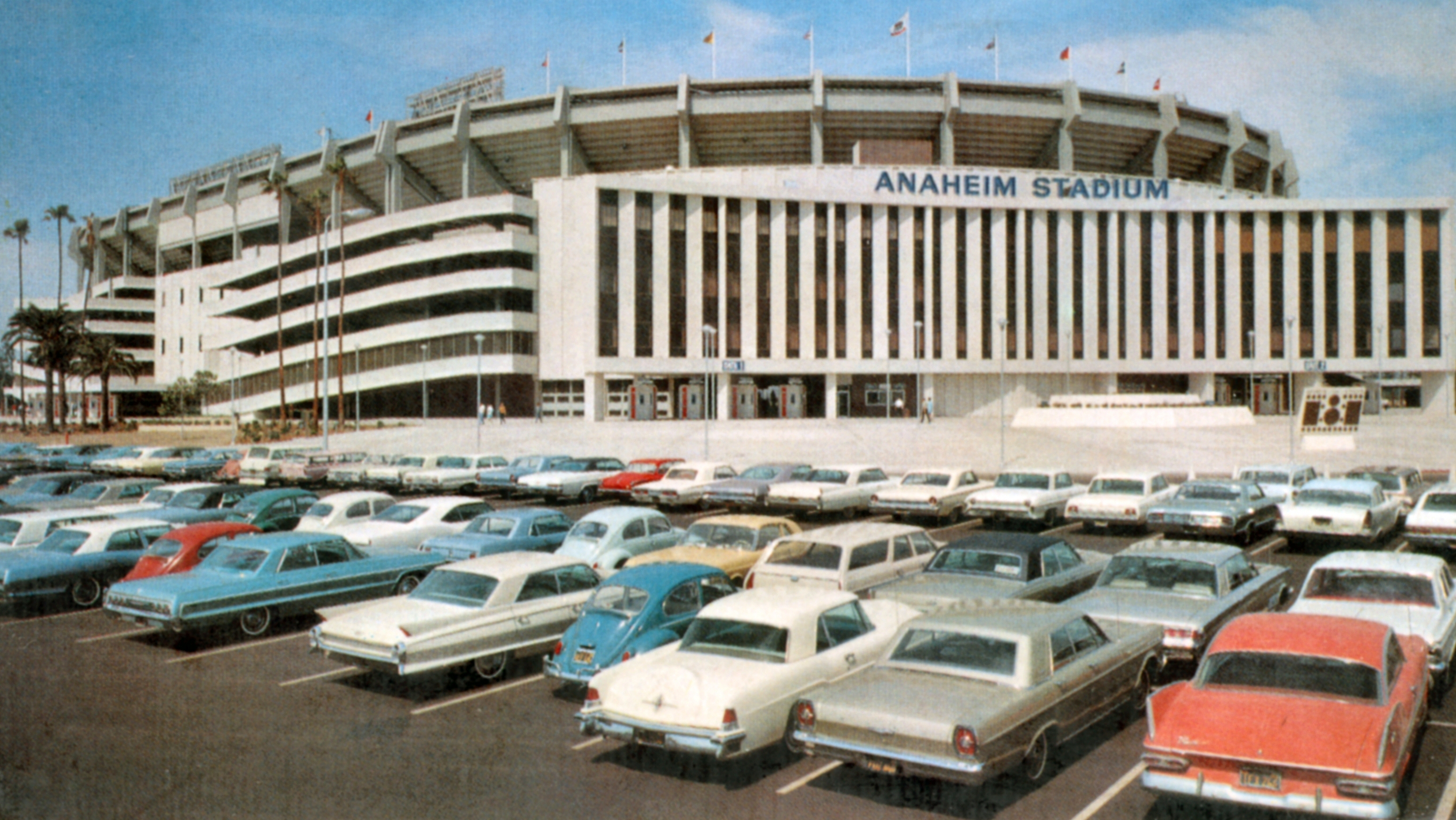
Exterior of Anaheim Stadium, circa 1967

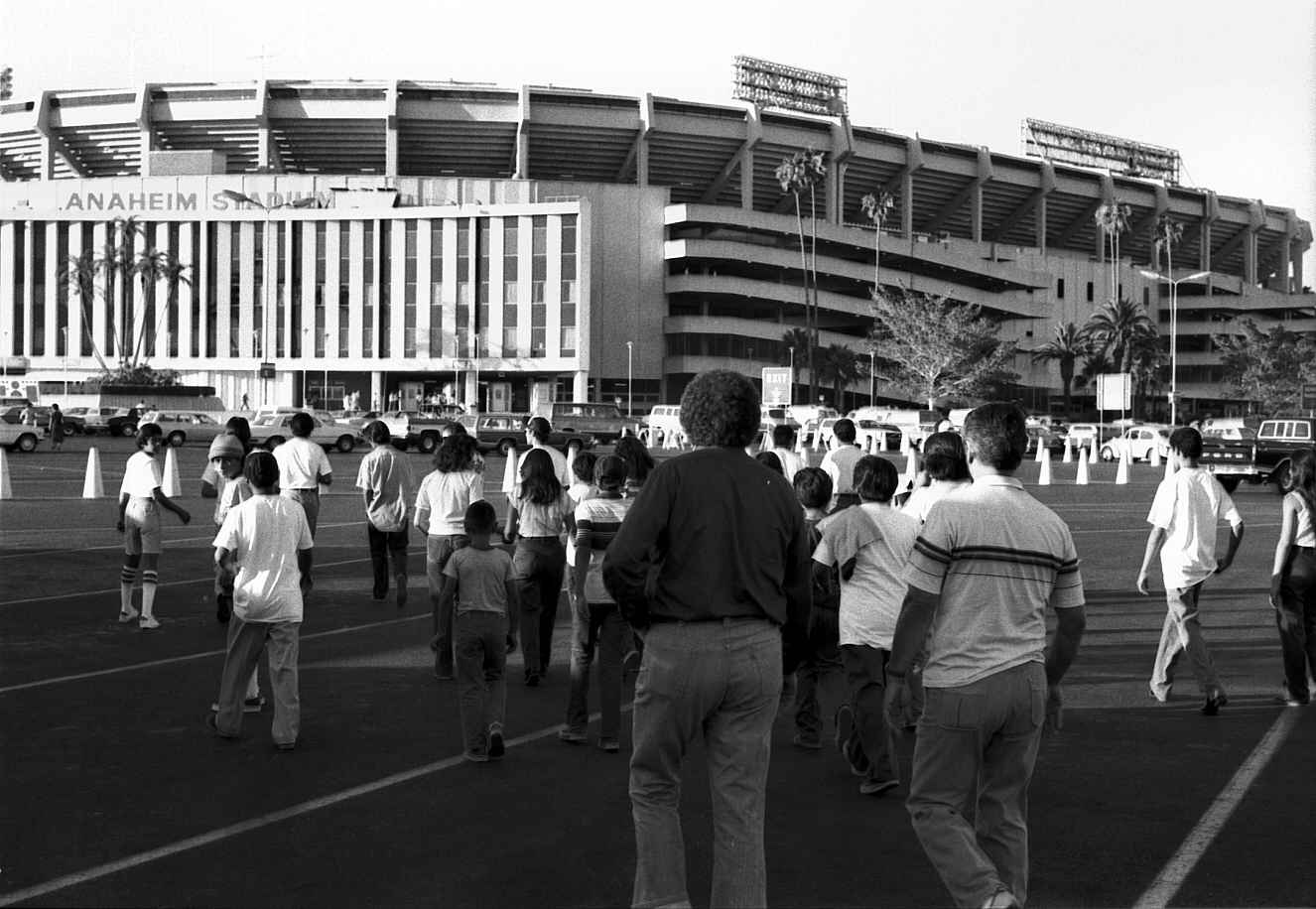
Exterior of Anaheim Stadium, July 1980

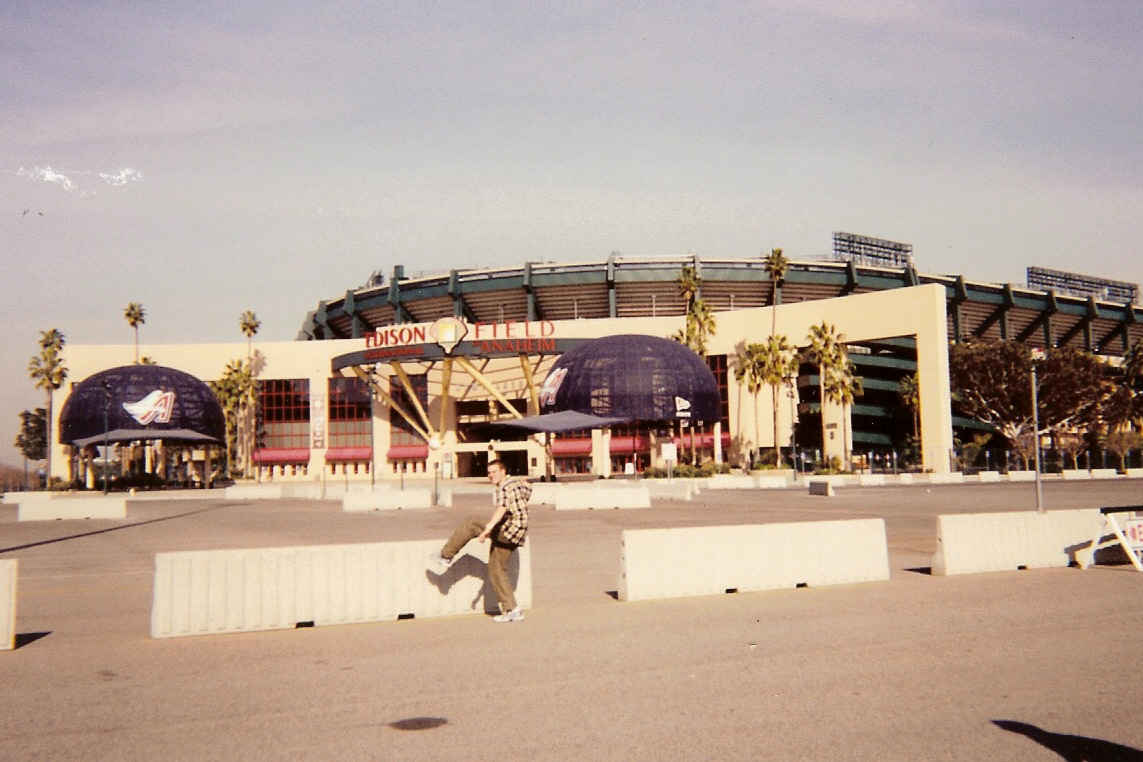
Exterior of Edison Field, December 2000

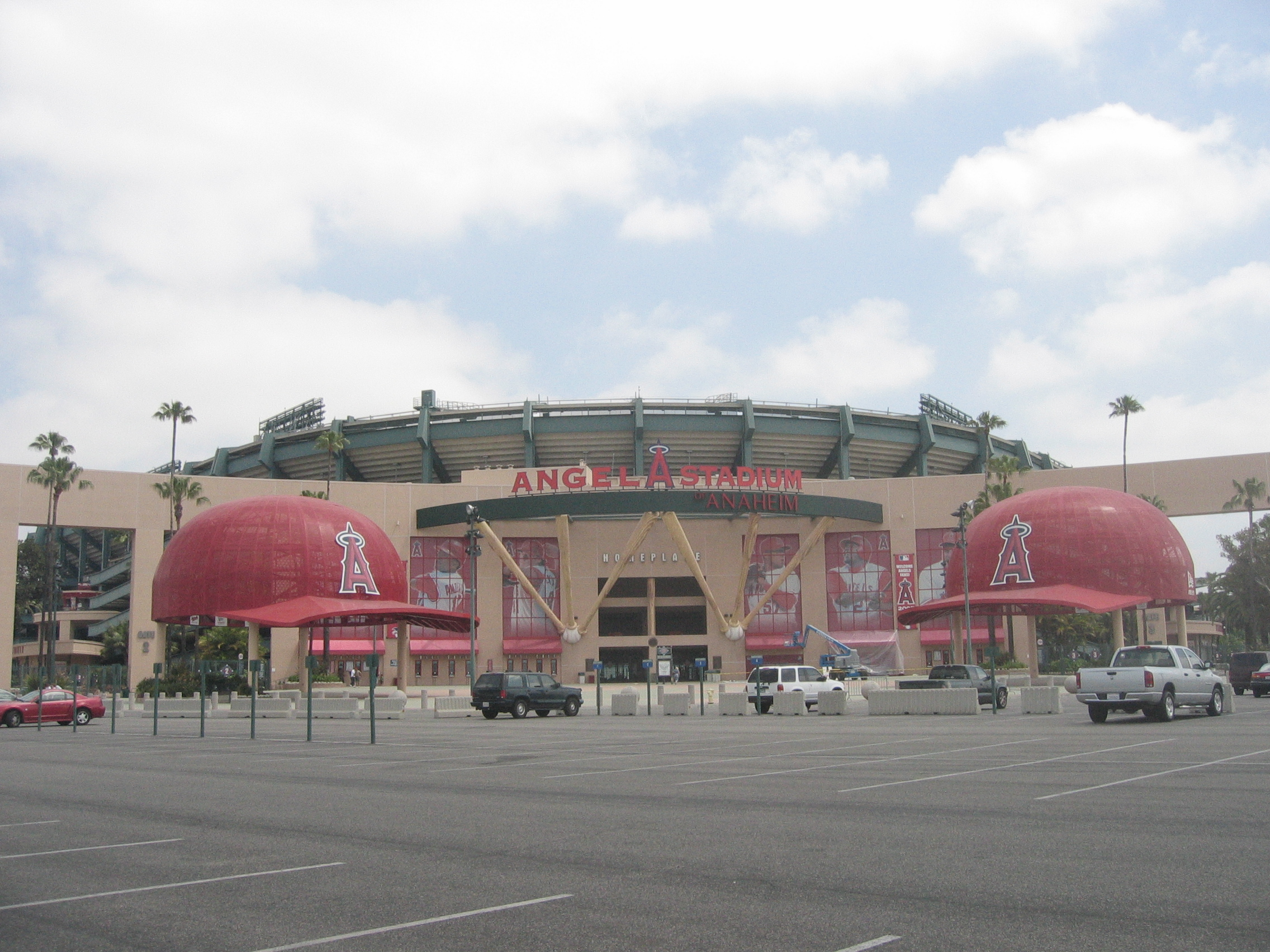
Exterior of Angel Stadium, May 2007

Events and tenants
Preceded by Chávez Ravine Stadium	Home of the Los Angeles Angels; 1966–present	Succeeded by Current
Preceded by Los Angeles Memorial Coliseum	Home of the Los Angeles Rams; 1980–1994	Succeeded by Busch Memorial Stadium
Preceded by Busch Memorial Stadium; Riverfront Stadium; Busch Stadium	Host of the Major League Baseball All-Star Game; 1967; 1989; 2010	Succeeded by Astrodome; Wrigley Field; Chase Field
