= Big A Sign =

Tall sign in Anaheim, California, US

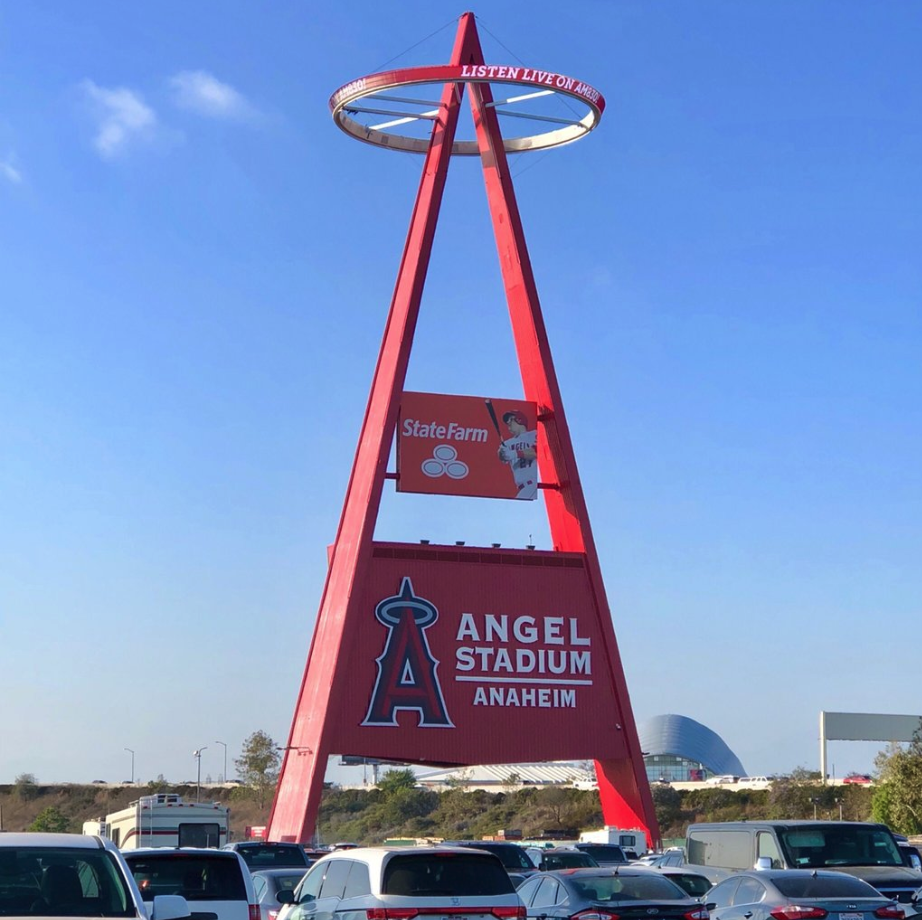
- Year: 1966; 60 years ago
- Subject: Los Angeles Angels logo
- Dimensions: 70 m (230 ft)
- Weight: 210 tons
- Location: Anaheim, California, United States
- Owner: Los Angeles Angels

The Big A Sign is a 230-foot-tall (70 m), 210-ton red metal sign in the shape of the letter "A" with a halo on top (mirroring the Los Angeles Angels logo), situated in the parking lot of Angel Stadium (formerly Anaheim Stadium) in Anaheim, California. The sign was originally installed in 1966 behind the left field fence but was moved to the parking lot in 1979, one year before American football's Los Angeles Rams started sharing the stadium with MLB's then-California Angels. The sign is also responsible for the nickname of Angel Stadium as "The Big A".

The halo lights up after every Angels win (regardless of whether it happens at home or on the road), which gives rise to the catchphrase "Light That Baby Up!" amongst Angels fans. (When Dick Enberg was an Angels broadcaster in the 1970s, he would punctuate the team's victories with the phrase "And the halo shines tonight!")

== History ==
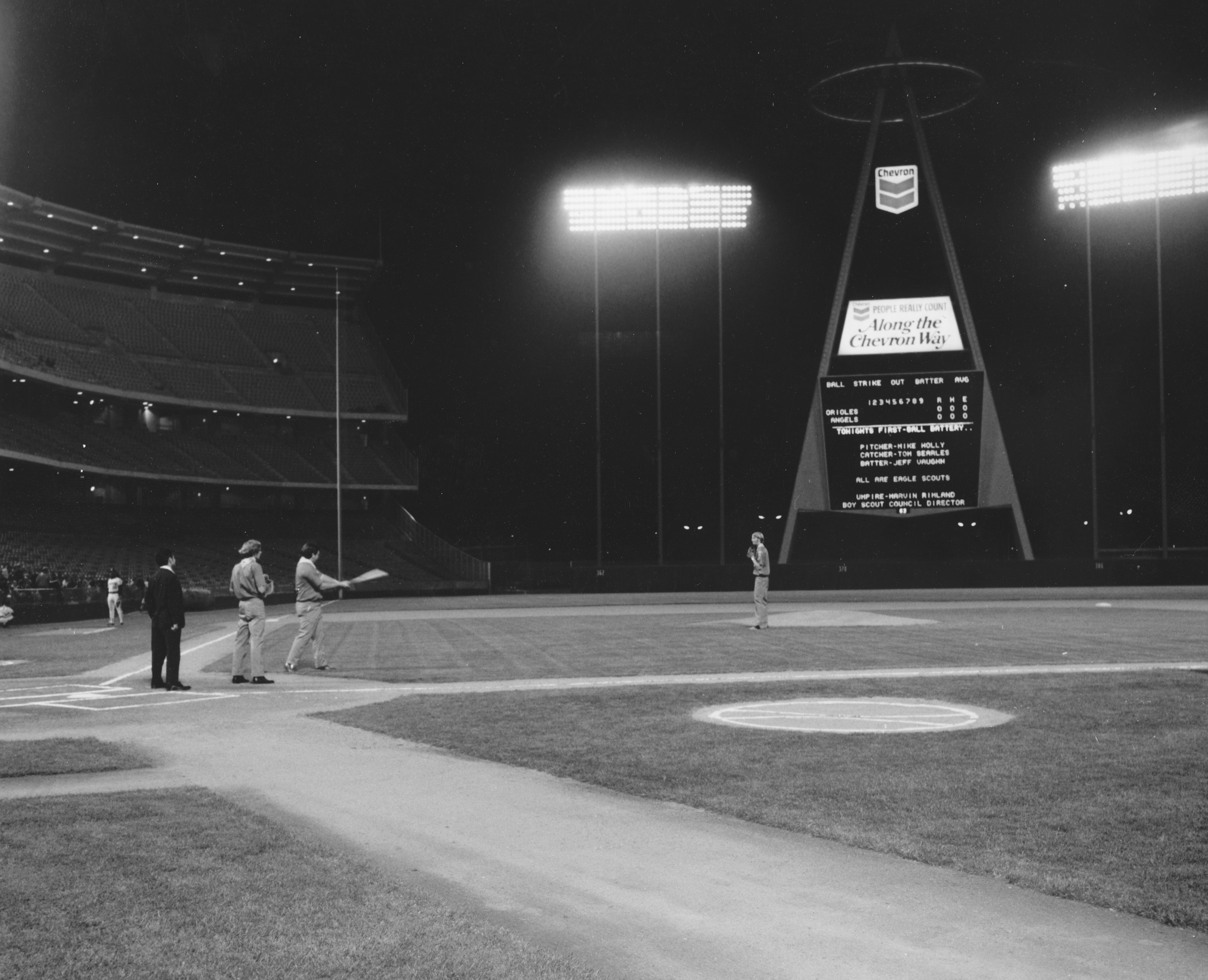
The Big A Sign in its original location in Anaheim Stadium c. 1973

The sign was erected in 1966 outside then-Anaheim Stadium specifically to hold the scoreboard. The $1 million construction cost was covered by Standard Oil of California in exchange for a 10-year advertising rights deal on the sign. The sign was initially colored white and stood beyond the left field wall. Measuring 230 feet (70 m) in height, at the time of its construction it was the tallest structure in Orange County, at 23 stories tall.

In 1979, one year before the Los Angeles Rams moved in, Anaheim Stadium was retrofitted to make it suitable to host American football games, including all decks of seating wrapping around the entire stadium. As a result, the Big A Sign was moved from its position overlooking the stadium into the parking lot, despite protests from Angels fans and owners. Approximately 1,000 people came to watch the sign be moved. However, after it had been moved approximately 10 feet (3.0 m), one of the dollies started to tilt the sign, requiring the seven-hour move to be postponed until the next day.

In 1995, when the Rams moved out of Angel Stadium to become the St. Louis Rams, a number of the 1979 retrofits were removed. As a result, there were proposals to move the sign back to its original location. However, this did not occur owing to the cost of moving it and because it had become a good meeting place for fans and afforded the Angels the opportunity to advertise to passing motorists.

== Use ==
Since its move to the parking lot, the Big A Sign has been used to advertise for the Angels' sponsors, and the old scoreboard has been used as an electronic marquee to promote upcoming Major League Baseball games to passing motorists on the nearby freeway. The halo on the top of the sign lights up to signify to passersby and nearby motorists that the Angels have won a game.

In 2017, the electrical system of the Big A Sign was tampered with, possibly in an attempt to charge a cell phone, as part of an outbreak of vandalism around Angel Stadium. A county supervisor said "the voltage on the ‘Big A’ is so high that you have to have a special certification just to get inside the fence. This guy could have been fried."
